= List of Food Network original programming =

This is a list of shows that have been broadcast (or are planned to be broadcast) on Food Network.

== # (Numbers and other symbols) ==
- 3 Days to Open with Bobby Flay – hosted by Bobby Flay
- 5 Ingredient Fix – hosted by Claire Robinson
- 24 Hour Restaurant Battle – hosted by Scott Conant
- $24 in 24 – hosted by Jeff Mauro
- 24 in 24: Last Chef Standing – hosted by Michael Symon and Esther Choi
- 30 Minute Meals – hosted by Rachael Ray
- $40 a Day – hosted by Rachael Ray
- 100 Cooks – hosted by Terry Crews, Nick DiGiovanni, and Alex Guarnaschelli

== A ==
- Aarti Party – hosted by Aarti Sequeira
- Ace of Cakes – starring Duff Goldman
- Alex's Day Off – hosted by Alex Guarnaschelli
- Amy Schumer Learns to Cook – hosted by Amy Schumer and Chris Fischer
- Ask Aida – hosted by Aida Mollenkamp

== B ==
- Bake You Rich – hosted by Buddy Valastro
- Barefoot Contessa – hosted by Ina Garten
- BBQ Blitz – hosted by Eddie Jackson
- BBQ Brawl – hosted by Bobby Flay, Jet Tila and Anne Burrell
- BBQ USA – hosted by Michael Symon
- Beat Bobby Flay – hosted by Bobby Flay
- Behind the Bash – hosted by Giada De Laurentiis
- Best Baker in America – hosted by Scott Conant
- The Best Thing I Ever Ate
- The Best Thing I Ever Made
- Big Daddy's House – hosted by Aaron McCargo Jr.
- The Big Waste – hosted by Anne Burrell, Bobby Flay, Alex Guarnaschelli and Michael Symon
- Bobby Flay's Barbecue Addiction – hosted by Bobby Flay
- Brunch at Bobby's – hosted by Bobby Flay

== C ==
- Cake Wars – hosted by Jonathan Bennett
- Candy Land – hosted by Kristin Chenoweth
- Challenge – hosted by Claire Robinson
- The Chef Jeff Project – hosted by Jeff Henderson
- Chefography – a series of biographies on Food Network star chefs
- Chefs vs. City – hosted by Chris Cosentino and Aarón Sanchez
- Chocolate with Jacques Torres – hosted by Jacques Torres
- Chopped – an elimination cooking series, hosted by Ted Allen
- Chopped After Hours
- Chopped Canada
- Chopped Junior – hosted by Ted Allen
- Chopped Sweets – hosted by Scott Conant
- Christmas Cookie Challenge – hosted by Eddie Jackson
- Cookie Wars – hosted by Jonathan Bennett
- Cooking for Real – hosted by Sunny Anderson
- Cooking Live – a call-in cooking show hosted by Sara Moulton
- A Cook's Tour – hosted by Anthony Bourdain
- Cupcake Wars – hosted by Justin Willman
- Cutthroat Kitchen – hosted by Alton Brown
- Cutthroat Kitchen: Knives Out - hosted by Brian Malarkey

== D ==
- Delicious Miss Brown – hosted by Kardea Brown
- Dessert First with Anne Thornton – hosted by Anne Thornton
- Diners, Drive-Ins and Dives – hosted by Guy Fieri
- Dining Around – hosted by Alan Richman and Nina Griscom
- Dinner: Impossible – hosted by Robert Irvine, later replaced by Michael Symon, back to Robert Irvine
- Down Home with the Neelys – hosted by Pat and Gina Neely
- Duff Takes the Cake – hosted by Duff Goldman
- Dweezil & Lisa – hosted by Dweezil Zappa and Lisa Loeb

== E ==
- East Meets West with Ming Tsai – hosted by Ming Tsai
- Eat St. – hosted by Canadian comedian James Cunningham
- Emeril Live – hosted by Emeril Lagasse; production ceased December 11, 2007
- Essence of Emeril – hosted by Emeril Lagasse
- Everyday Italian – hosted by Giada De Laurentiis

== F ==
- Family Style – reality show following Joey and Melissa Maggiore
- Farmhouse Rules – hosted by Nancy Fuller
- Fat Chef
- Feasting on Asphalt – hosted by Alton Brown
- Feasting on Asphalt 2: The River Run – hosted by Alton Brown
- Feasting on Waves – hosted by Alton Brown
- Flavortown Food Fight - hosted by Guy Fieri
- Food 911 – hosted by Tyler Florence
- Food Court Wars – hosted by Tyler Florence
- Food Detectives – hosted by Ted Allen
- Food Feuds – hosted by Michael Symon
- Food Network Challenge – hosted by Keegan Gerhard; replaced by Claire Robinson in 2010
- Food Network Star – hosted by Bobby Flay and Giada De Laurentiis

== G ==
- The Galloping Gourmet – hosted by Graham Kerr
- Giada at Home – hosted by Giada De Laurentiis
- Giada in Paradise – hosted by Giada De Laurentiis
- Giada's Weekend Getaways – hosted by Giada De Laurentiis
- Girl Meets Farm – hosted by Molly Yeh
- Glutton for Punishment – hosted by Bob Blumer
- Good Deal with Dave Lieberman – hosted by Dave Lieberman
- Good Eats – hosted by Alton Brown
- The Gourmet Next Door – hosted by Amy Finley
- The Great Food Truck Race – hosted by Tyler Florence
- Grillin' & Chillin' – hosted by Bobby Flay and Jack McDavid
- Guilty Pleasures
- Guy Off the Hook – hosted by Guy Fieri
- Guy's Big Bite – hosted by Guy Fieri
- Guy's Grocery Games – hosted by Guy Fieri
- Guy's Ranch Kitchen – hosted by Guy Fieri

== H ==
- Halloween Baking Championship – hosted by Richard Blais (2015) and Jeff Dunham (2016)
- Halloween Wars
- Have Fork, Will Travel – hosted by Zane Lamprey
- Holiday Baking Championship – hosted by Bobby Deen
- How to Boil Water – hosted by Emeril Lagasse 1993–94, Cathy Lowe and Sean Donnellan 1994–2000, Lynne Koplitz and Frederic van Coppernolle 2000–03, and Tyler Florence and Jack Hourigan 2003–present
- The Hungry Detective – hosted by Chris Cognac

== I ==
- I Hart Food – hosted by Hannah Hart
- Inside Eats with Rhett & Link – hosted by Rhett & Link
- Iron Chef – hosted by Takeshi Kaga
- Iron Chef America: Battle of the Masters – hosted by Alton Brown, Kevin Brauch and Mark Dacascos
- Iron Chef America: The Series – hosted by Alton Brown, Kevin Brauch and Mark Dacascos
- Iron Chef Gauntlet – hosted by Alton Brown

== J ==
- Jamie at Home – hosted by Jamie Oliver

== K ==
- Kelsey's Essentials – hosted by Kelsey Nixon
- Kid in a Candy Store – hosted by Adam Gertler
- Kids Baking Championship – hosted by Duff Goldman and Valerie Bertinelli
- Kids BBQ Championship – hosted by Eddie Jackson and Damaris Phillips
- The Kitchen – hosted by Sunny Anderson, Katie Lee, Jeff Mauro, Marcela Valladolid and Geoffrey Zakarian
- Kitchen Accomplished – hosted by Cat Cora and Peter Marr
- Kitchen Casino – hosted by Bill Rancic
- Kitchen Sink – hosts rotate – including Tregaye Fraser
- Kitchen Undercover – hosted by Antonia Lofaso and Nestor Milian

== L ==
- Licence to Grill – hosted by Rob Rainford
- Low Carb and Lovin' It – hosted by George Stella

== M ==
- Man v. Food – hosted by Adam Richman
- Mary Makes It Easy – hosted by Mary Berg
- Mystery Diners – a reality show featuring Charles M. Stiles

== N ==
- Nadia G's Bitchin' Kitchen – hosted by Nadia G
- The Naked Chef – hosted by Jamie Oliver
- The Next Iron Chef – hosted by Alton Brown and Mark Dacascos
- No Recipe Road Trip with the Try Guys – hosted by The Try Guys

== O ==
- Oliver's Twist – hosted by Jamie Oliver

== P ==
- Patricia Heaton Parties – hosted by Patricia Heaton
- Paula's Home Cooking – hosted by Paula Deen
- Paula's Party – hosted by Paula Deen
- The Pioneer Woman – hosted by Ree Drummond
- Pitmasters - hosted by Andrew Zimmern
- Private Chefs of Beverly Hills

== Q ==
- Quick Fix Meals with Robin Miller – hosted by Robin Miller

== R ==
- Rachael Ray's Kids Cook-Off – hosted by Rachael Ray
- Rachael Ray's Tasty Travels – hosted by Rachael Ray
- Rachael vs. Guy: Celebrity Cook-Off – hosted by Rachael Ray and Guy Fieri
- Ready... Set... Cook! – hosted by Robin Young (1995), Sissy Biggers (1995–2000) and Ainsley Harriott (2000–2001)
- Rebel Eats – hosted by Justin Warner
- Recipe for Success – originally hosted by Marlie Hall, then Eric McLendon
- Restaurant Express – hosted by Robert Irvine
- Restaurant: Impossible – hosted by Robert Irvine
- Restaurant Impossible: Last Call – hosted by Aarón Sanchez and Jen Agg
- Restaurant Makeover – hosted by Robert Irvine
- Restaurant Stakeout – hosted by Willie Degel
- Road Tasted – hosted by Jamie and Bobby Deen

== S ==
- Secrets of a Restaurant Chef – hosted by Anne Burrell
- Southern at Heart – hosted by Damaris Phillips
- Spring Baking Championship – hosted by Bobby Deen
- Sugar Rush – hosted by Warren Brown
- Supermarket Stakeout – hosted by Alex Guarnaschelli
- The Surreal Gourmet – hosted by Bob Blumer
- Sweet Genius – hosted by Ron Ben-Israel

== T ==
- Ten Dollar Dinners – hosted by Melissa d'Arabian
- The Thirsty Traveler – hosted by Kevin Brauch
- Throwdown! with Bobby Flay – hosted by Bobby Flay
- Top 5 Restaurants – hosted by Sunny Anderson and Geoffrey Zakarian
- Tournament of Champions – hosted by Guy Fieri
- Trisha's Southern Kitchen – hosted by Trisha Yearwood
- Two Fat Ladies – hosted by Jennifer Paterson and Clarissa Dickson Wright

== U ==
- Ultimate Recipe Showdown – hosted by Marc Summers and Guy Fieri
- Unwrapped – hosted by Marc Summers
- Unwrapped 2.0 – hosted by Alfonso Ribeiro

== V ==
- Valerie's Home Cooking – hosted by Valerie Bertinelli

== W ==
- What Would Brian Boitano Make? – hosted by Brian Boitano
- Will Work For Food – hosted by Adam Gertler
- Worst Bakers in America – co-hosted by Lorraine Pascale and Duff Goldman
- Worst Cooks in America – co-hosted by Anne Burrell, Beau MacMillan (season 1), Robert Irvine (season 2), Bobby Flay (seasons 3–5), Tyler Florence (seasons 6–)

== See also ==
- List of programs broadcast by Food Network Canada
