= List of programs broadcast by CTV Life Channel =

This is a list of television programs broadcast by the Canadian television channel CTV Life Channel and its incarnations, Gusto, M3, MuchMore and MuchMoreMusic.

== Current programming ==
As of 2024:

- A is for Apple
- A Place in the Sun: Home or Away
- Amazing Wedding Cakes
- Beeny's Restoration Nightmare
- Ben's Menu
- The Block
- Bones
- Building the Dream
- Chefs of the James Beard House
- Chinese Food Made Easy
- Cook Eat China
- Darren Robertson's Charcoal Kitchen
- Delicious Iceland
- The Delicious Miss Dahl
- Double Your Dish
- The Edible Road Show
- Escape to the Country
- Essence of India
- Evolving Vegan
- Fast, Fresh, Simple
- Fish the Dish
- Food and Drink
- The French Chef
- French Food Safari
- The Great Canadian Food Show
- Heston's Great British Food
- Holmes 911
- Holmes on Homes
- The House That £100k Built
- The House That £100k Built: Tricks of the Trade
- The Incredible Spice Men
- Indian Food Made Easy
- James Martin's United Cakes of America
- Jamie's 15 Minute Meals
- Jamie's 30 Minute Meals
- Jamie: Keep Cooking and Carry On
- Jonathan Phang's Gourmet Trains
- Junk Brothers
- License to Grill
- Luke Nguyen's United Kingdom
- The Marilyn Denis Show
- Martha Bakes
- Martha and Snoop's Potluck Dinner Party
- Martha Stewart's Cooking School
- Mary Makes It Easy
- MasterChef Australia
- MasterChef Canada
- My Kitchen Rules
- Nigel Slater's Dish of the Day
- One World Kitchen
- Paddock to Plate
- Paul and Nick's Big Food Trip
- PopLife
- Rachel Allen's Cake Diaries
- Rachel Khoo's Kitchen Cookbook: Cosmopolitan Cook
- The Real Girl's Kitchen
- The Restoration Man
- Rick Stein
- Road Grill
- Roux Scholarship
- Sachie's Kitchen
- Street Food Around the World
- Supermarket Sweep UK
- Tareq Taylor's Nordic Cookery
- There's No Taste Like Home
- Where to I Do?

== Former programming ==
Programming previously aired on M3/MuchMore/MuchMoreMusic CTV Life Channel:

=== # ===
- 100 Greatest...
- 100 Most Shocking Music Moments

=== A-E ===
- The ABCs of Rock
- America's Next Top Model
- Anger Management
- Arrow
- Back In...
- BackTrax
- Bands Reunited
- Before They Were Rock Stars
- Behind the Music
- Best Ink
- Born to Diva
- Boston's Finest
- Brooke Knows Best
- But Can They Sing?
- Candidly Nicole
- Cash Cab
- Celebracadabra
- Celebrity Duets
- Celebrity Fit Club
- Celebrity Rehab with Dr. Drew
- The Chris Isaak Show
- Classic Albums
- Clip Trip
- The Club
- The Colbert Report
- Confessions of a Teen Idol
- Cook Like A Chef (2020)
- Coolio's Rules
- Daily Fix
- Dance Your Ass Off
- Dancing with the Stars
- Dating Naked
- Deeper
- A Different World
- Don't Forget The Lyrics (U.S. primetime version and syndicated version)
- Driven
- E! True Hollywood Story
- Ed
- Ed Sullivan's Rock 'n' Roll Classics
- Ego trip's The (White) Rapper Show
- Entourage
- Evolution

=== F-J ===
- The Fabulous Life of...
- The Fall
- Fame
- Fan Club
- The First Family
- The Flash
- Flavor of Love
- Flour Power
- Franklin & Bash
- Freaks and Geeks
- Freshly Pressed
- Gilmore Girls
- Gogglebox
- The Goldbergs
- Gotham
- HeatMeter
- Hey Paula
- Hit Me Baby One More Time
- Hogan Knows Best
- Hollywood Game Night
- Hoppus On Music
- Hot in Cleveland
- I Know My Kid's a Star
- I’m a Celebrity... Get Me out of Here!
- Intimate and Interactive
- It Takes a Choir
- Jennifer Falls
- Just Shoot Me!

=== K-O ===
- Kept
- The Late Late Show with James Corden
- Let's Talk About Pep
- Listed
- Live from Abbey Road
- Living With...
- The Loop
- Love Monkey
- Luke's Parental Advisory
- Mama Drama
- Marshal Law: Texas
- MasterChef
- MasterChef Canada
- The McCarthys
- The Mentalist
- Michael Jackson: The Trial
- Mike & Molly
- Mission: Man Band
- MMOnStage
- MMM Profile
- The Monkees
- Motormouth
- Mr. Box Office
- MuchMore With...
- MuchMoreMusic Live
- My Favourite Things
- The Mysteries of Laura
- The NewMusic
- NewsRadio
- Nosedive
- The O.C.

=== P-T ===
- Parks and Recreation
- Partridge Family
- Party of Five
- The People's Couch
- Perception
- Person of Interest
- Personals
- Pop Quiz
- Pop-up Video
- Popaganda
- The Power Hour
- Pretty Little Liars
- The Princes of Malibu
- Raising The Bar
- Ravenswood
- Reign
- Reloaded
- Retro Boogie Dance Party
- RetroRequest
- Revival
- Rock & Roll Jeopardy! 1999-2001 (Reruns until 2004)
- The Rock Life
- RuPaul's Drag Race
- The Salt-N-Pepa Show
- Satisfaction
- Saturday Night Live
- Signed, Sealed, Delivered
- Scott Baio Is 45...and Single
- Scott Baio Is 46...and Pregnant
- The Smoke
- So You Think You Can Dance?
- Sober House 2
- The Social
- SpeakEasy
- Spun Out
- The Story Of...
- Storytellers
- Strange Love
- Supergroup
- Supernatural
- The Surreal Life
- The Surreal Life: Fame Games
- Switch
- Take 2...
- Tattoos After Dark
- Test Pattern
- Tip of My Tongue
- Tommy Lee Goes to College
- True Blood
- TV Moments

=== U-Z ===
- Uncovered
- The Vampire Diaries
- VH1: All Access
- VH1 Divas
- VH1's Legends
- Video on Trial
- VideoFACT
- The Voice
- Where You At, Baby?!
- Wonderland
- Younger

=== Video blocks ===
- 80s@8
- 90s@9'
- All Time Top 10
- Big Tunes
- First Spin Singles
- Juiced!
- MMMTop5.com
- MuchMoreRetro
- Now and Then Videoflow
- Playlist
- PunchMuchMoreRetro
- Ranked!
- Retro 30
- Rock Show

== See also ==
- List of programs broadcast by MuchMusic
