= Gusto (TV channel) =

Gusto TV
- Country: Canada
- Broadcast area: National
- Headquarters: Ottawa, Ontario

Ownership
- Owner: Knight Enterprises

History
- Launched: December 11, 2013

Links
- Website: Gusto TV

Gusto TV is a Canadian streaming network owned by Knight Enterprises featuring programming related to food, cooking, and cuisine.

The channel was originally established in 2013 as an English-language Category B specialty channel. In May 2016, Knight licensed domestic rights to the Gusto brand and associated programming to Bell Media. Bell would relaunch the channel on September 1, using a Category A license formerly used by its music and entertainment channel M3 (formerly MuchMoreMusic, which was launched in 1998 by CHUM Limited). Gusto TV later relaunched independently in 2022 as a streaming channel.

== History ==
In October 2010, Christopher Knight was granted approval by the Canadian Radio-television and Telecommunications Commission (CRTC) to operate "MmmTV", described as "a national, English‑language Category 2 specialty programming service devoted to luxury, from vacations and leisure activities to home furnishings and fashion."

In the summer and fall of 2013, several media outlets began reporting on aspects Gusto TV and its founder, Christopher Knight, owner of Knight Enterprises. In several reports, it indicated the launch of the channel on December 11, 2013. This was confirmed, when on December 5, an official press release was issued by Knight Enterprises.

On August 29, 2015, Gusto TV broadcast Live Feed; described by the network as an example of the slow television concept, the special consisted of live footage from the kitchen of the Beckta Dining and Wine Bar in Ottawa.

On May 4, 2016, Knight Enterprises announced that it had sold Canadian rights to the Gusto TV brand to Bell Media, and that the current Gusto TV service will be discontinued and replaced by a new version of the service under Bell Media ownership. The channel's current parent company, Gusto Worldwide Media (GWM), will license Gusto TV's current programming to Bell in addition to producing future series for the channel. GWM will continue to own international rights to the Gusto brand and will launch Gusto as an online television service in 2017 for international markets. On September 1, 2016, M3 was relaunched under the Gusto name but it was renamed to CTV Life Channel in 2019.

In 2022, Knight Enterprises relaunched Gusto TV in Canada on Samsung TV Plus. In 2026, the channel was added to Bell Fibe TV.

== Programming ==
- A Place in the Sun
- Amazing Wedding Cakes
- Fast, Fresh, Simple
- Chinese Food Made Easy
- The Edible Road Show
- Martha Bakes
- My Kitchen Rules
- Rachel Allen's Cake Diaries
- Rick Stein
- The French Chef
- Chefs of the James Beard House
- Building the Dream
- Food and Drink
- French Food Safari
- Jonathan Phang's Gourmet Trains
- Real Girl's Kitchen
- Heston's Great British Food
- James Martin's United Cakes of America
- Roux Scholarship
- Paul and Nick's Big Food Trip
- The Delicious Miss Dahl
- Road Grill
- Sachie's Kitchen
- Street Food Around The World
- The Incredible Spice Men
- There's No Taste Like Home
- License to Grill
- Cook Like A Chef
