= Platinum Weddings =

- Genre: Reality television
- Country of origin: United States
- Original language: English
- No. of seasons: 5
- No. of episodes: 85

Production
- Executive producer: Danielle Ostroske
- Running time: 22 minutes
- Production company: Film Garden

Original release
- Network: WE tv
- Release: July 23, 2006 – May 16, 2010

Platinum Weddings is an American reality television series which premiered on July 23, 2006, on the WE tv cable channel. The series chronicles the lives of couples who are planning their upcoming lavish weddings. The series spawned one spin-off series, Amazing Wedding Cakes.
