= Wayne Schafer =

American chef

- Wayne Schafer, Big Fat Daddy's
- Born: August 28, 1963 (age 63); Baltimore, Maryland
- Occupation: Barbecue Pitmaster
- Employer: Big Fat Daddy's
- Known for: Baltimore Pit Beef and Dry Rub Seasoning
- Spouse: Cindy Fahnestock-Schafer
- Website: bigfatdaddys.com

Wayne Mark Schafer (born August 28, 1963) is an East Coast barbecue pitmaster and owner of Big Fat Daddy's concession stands and catering.

Schafer is a lifetime member of the Kansas City Barbeque Society. He and his business have been featured in more than 100 publications online and in print, as well as national TV appearances. Rachael Ray Magazine featured Big Fat Daddy's for beef in Maryland. Schafer is considered an authority on dry rub seasoning and Baltimore Pit Beef.

Schafer has also gained publicity for his Maryland Crab Dip in a Bread Boule appearing on season one and season two of Food Network's Carnival Eats. For 2015, York, Pennsylvania Convention and Visitor's Bureau cited Big Fat Daddy's facility a "Made in America Factory Tour Stop" in conjunction with induction of Big Fat Daddy's into the Southern Food and Beverage Museum, part of the National Food and Beverage Foundation.

== Big Fat Daddy's ==
Schafer learned the festival business from his stepfather in the late 1970s while working for food concessionaire, Roban Foods. Soon after high school he started J&W Foods while working in Baltimore restaurants. Schafer's earliest print article in the Baltimore Sun Archives Maryland Section, circa 1984, shows him as selling primarily carnival type food such as Italian sausage, pizza, and onion rings. The menu later expanded to include gyros, various meat sandwiches, souvlaki, lamb sausage, cheesesteak, hot dogs, hamburgers, and soft drinks. J&W Foods was located in Overlea, Maryland and later moved to Fawn Grove, Pennsylvania. Schafer wanted an alternative to the greasy sandwich steak being sold at fairs and festivals, and began experimenting with various cuts of beef.

Wayne used his concessions knowledge to reinvent the business, and chose the name Big Fat Daddy's. The business still primarily worked concessions at fairs and festivals but featured beef and barbecue as the main attraction, even on the Cheesesteaks. The Schafer brothers became partners in a pit beef restaurant out of a small roadside shack on Route 40 in Baltimore, a stretch of roadway known as "Pit Beef Row" and considered a part of Baltimore history. It is reported that the stand closed sometime in 2003, but the building still remains and has since been operational as a pit beef stand under many different names.

The Schafer brothers were the subject of many articles and books, particularly for their origination of a dry rub seasoning and the way in which the pit beef was grilled at high heat over hardwood. Feature articles about the style of beef appeared in Saveur Magazine suggesting it was considered Baltimore's version of barbecue. Soon to follow came Baltimore-raised author Steven Raichlen whose featured article in the New York Times gave away the base recipe for the dry rub seasoning. Raichlen featured Big Fat Daddy's recipes many times thereafter, reprinting them in his Barbecue Bible series of cookbooks.

The Schafer brothers continued to operate at fairs, festivals, and catering events. Both operated separately and individually as Big Fat Daddy's and Brian's Big Fat Daddy's but problems ensued due to Brian's failing health and business disagreements. Court transcripts show Wayne Schafer gained full ownership of Big Fat Daddy's in 2005 after a lengthy legal battle. Brian's company was then renamed "Big Boy Foods" and operated at fairs and festivals until Brian's passing in 2014.

Schafer has spoken out against beef company monopolies and the use of artificial growth hormones, and has encouraged food vendors to "go greener". He has a large Twitter following and blogs about barbecue.

After nearly three decades serving the Baltimore (Rosedale) community, Big Fat Daddy's moved its operations base to Manchester, Pennsylvania in 2012, according to sources in York, Pennsylvania. Schafer supports catering events and concessions operations in eight states, teaches cooking classes and makes special appearances.

== Museum induction and permanent exhibit ==
In November 2014, Big Fat Daddy's was inducted into the Southern Food and Beverage Museum (SOFAB) in New Orleans, Louisiana, as part of its permanent exhibit of the "Trail of Smoke and Fire". This museum is part of the National Food and Beverage Foundation. The museum's exhibition is curated by Steven Raichlen who is credited with helping Big Fat Daddy's get early publicity. The induction was based solely on Schafer's contribution to Maryland's pit beef and dry rub culinary history which Raichlen calls "Baltimore's Version of Barbecue". Schafer's old Pit Beef Sign, vintage meat slicer, and other objects are on display from the original pit beef stand circa 1982.

== Television ==
=== Food Network ===
Schafer's own "Crab Dip in a Bread Boule" recipe was chosen to air on season one of the Cooking Channel's Carnival Eats television show in episode 1.2 entitled "Viva! Vienna! Festival; Contraband Days Festival" with original air date August 25, 2014. Schafer is seen showing host Noah Cappe how to make his famous Maryland recipe. The episode was filmed in Vienna, Virginia, in May 2014. Schafer tailored a recipe from his mother, who was from Salisbury, on the Eastern Shore.

Schafer was invited back to the show and featured as a repeat guest for his "Colossal Got Beef Crabcake Sandwich" on season 2 episode 2.7 "From Strawberry to Silver Dollar", which first aired on September 10, 2015. This award-winning crab cake was topped with Schafer's famous pit beef and included bacon, cheddar, provolone and crab dip. The episode was filmed at the Brandywine Strawberry Festival in Brandywine, Pennsylvania, earlier in June that year.

=== ABC affiliates ===
Schafer has made several TV appearances on ABC stations supporting local fairs of which he's been a long-time veteran. In June 2017, he was a guest on Washington D.C.'s ABC 7-WJLA morning show, "Let's Talk", where he served his pork BBQ to meteorologist Brian van de Graaff and show host Julie Wright, talking primarily of the benefits of attending the Celebrate Fairfax! Festival. In the same month, he was featured on ABC News 27-WHTM speaking of the 89th annual Jubilee Day in Mechanicsburg, Pennsylvania.

== Hogging Up BBQ Festival ==
Schafer hosted and promoted the Hogging Up BBQ & Music Festival, the first of which was first held in 2013 in Clear Brook, Virginia and benefited four non-profit groups. The festival is also a Kansas City Barbeque Society sanctioned event.

The festival ran again in 2014 in Clear Brook, Virginia, benefitting the local SPCA; it also included a backyard barbecue festival and car show.

Plans for a later Hogging Up West Virginia festival and 2015's festival fell through due to lack of sponsorship. Schafer stated on the Hogging Up WV site, that the WV event was cancelled due to "variety of reasons", although the main one noted was a lack of sponsors.

== Tour stop ==
Big Fat Daddy's was named a 2015 York, Pennsylvania Factory Tour Stop by the York Convention and Visitor's Bureau. The mini tour of the Pitmaster Facility and view of his mini grilling collection features history and artifacts of Swift and Company and C.F. Sauer Company. Schafer announced that his 2015 tour would be donating a portion of each admission to support Bell Family Shelter.

== Trademarks ==
Schafer and his wife own four trademarks jointly, including three on Got Beef?® products in various class codes including housewares, cups, and mugs. Additional trademarks are owned for Got Beef?® on clothing, namely, women's apparel, men's apparel, children's apparel, T-shirts, button up shirts, shorts, hoodies, sweatshirts, jackets, skull caps, and hats (apparel), and a third for spice rubs.

Additionally, Schafer owns the hashtag rights to #BFD when used in conjunction with marketing.

== Personal life ==
Schafer began working for his parents' concessions company, Roban Foods. This training helped him start his own business soon after high school. Schafer attended Towson High School and grew up in the Towson and Rosedale areas of Baltimore County.

While working his first company, J&W Foods, Schafer also worked at many local restaurants in the Baltimore area, including Gibby's, Chiapparelli's, and Tully's. At one point in life, Schafer obtained his Commercial Driver's License and considered a change of career from the hectic concessions business, but disliked the long time away from his family during a stint with Schneider.

Schafer's family dedicates Mother's Day to raising money for Bell Socialization Services' family shelter in York, Pennsylvania. Schafer also ran a several-year scholarship for Kenwood High School in remembrance of Anna Stickel, a young teen (he had never met) who was hit crossing the railroad tracks in his home town of Baltimore, to raise awareness.

Schafer is a fan of the Baltimore Orioles and Baltimore Ravens. He cooks for enjoyment and although he is a lifetime member of the Kansas City Barbeque Society and Mid Atlantic Barbecue Association, he does not compete due to his hectic work schedule. He enjoys fishing and boating.

Schafer has three children from previous marriages. He resides in Baltimore, Maryland, and Danforth, Maine, with third wife Cindy Fahnestock-Schafer, also known as artist and book author Ira Mency.
