= Dinner: Impossible =

American television program

- Starring: Robert Irvine; Michael Symon
- Country of origin: United States
- Original language: English
- No. of seasons: 9
- No. of episodes: 84 (list of episodes)

Production
- Executive producers: Marc Summers (seasons 1–8); Robert Irvine (season 9–); Brian Lando (season 9–)
- Running time: 30 minutes/60 minutes
- Production companies: Marc Summers Productions (seasons 1–8); Shooters TV (seasons 1–8); Lando Entertainment (season 9)

Original release
- Network: Food Network
- Release: January 24, 2007 – November 9, 2021

Related
- Restaurant: Impossible

Dinner: Impossible is an American reality competition television series broadcast by the Food Network and initially hosted by Robert Irvine. The first episode aired on January 24, 2007, and the last episode aired in 2010. Food Network began airing the eighth season on March 3, 2010.

Each episode, the host is given a challenge that must be completed within a given time. Challenges have included preparing a large dinner aboard a luxury train, an "authentic" 18th-century American colonial dinner (prepared with period cooking methods and tools), and a luxury meal on a small, isolated, New England island.

On January 11, 2021, Robert Irvine announced on his Facebook page that the show would be returning this spring with new episodes. Food network went on to confirm the series’ return.

The show returned on March 11, 2021, for a four-episode run.

== Premise ==
With its name and other elements suggesting the 1960s television series Mission: Impossible, the program explores whether a multi-course meal for a large group can be prepared by the chef and his team with limited resources, no advance planning and in a fixed period. In a scene echoing the opening sequence of Mission: Impossible, each episode opens with the chef receiving his assignment, detailing where, for whom, in how long and under what conditions he must prepare the week's meal. From this point forward, a countdown timer is periodically shown, displaying the amount of time remaining.

Having received his challenge, the chef travels to the assignment location where he is met by one or more of his team of sous chefs and any local assistants provided by the facility. After surveying available ingredients, tools and appliances, the menu is planned and preparation organized. Often, the chef recruits additional chefs as the episode goes along. At this point, the team is often able to go shopping for additional ingredients, although the availability of items and the limited time often make selection of ingredients difficult (e.g., there may not be enough time to fully defrost a frozen item). At the location itself, preparation space can be restricted, with limited access to ovens, stoves, and cooking tools. Under these varying conditions, the chef must execute the menu within the time limits he is given. During the mission, curve balls are sometimes thrown into the mix mid-episode by the representatives, including adding guests, entrees, ingredients, etc.

As the countdown reaches its final minutes, the chef and his team rush to put the finishing touches on each dish. Because the meal is typically served to a large number of diners (although there are episodes with smaller numbers), service sometimes occurs in several courses. While the chef is not always successful in meeting all the stated terms of the challenge (due to scenarios like lack of ingredients or appliance malfunction), he generally meets the majority of them and is thanked by the guests.

== Hosts ==
Dinner: Impossible was hosted by Chef Robert Irvine for four seasons. When "embellishments and inaccuracies in [Irvine's] résumé" came to light in 2008, Food Network released Irvine from his contract and replaced him with Chef Michael Symon, who hosted the show for ten episodes beginning in mid-2008. On November 20, 2008, Food Network announced that it would reinstate Irvine as host for six episodes which began airing in April 2009. Irvine continued as host when the show began it seventh season in August 2009. He was retained for the 2010 season as well.

A related show, Restaurant: Impossible premiered in January 2011. Restaurant: Impossible references Dinner: Impossible with a similar opening. Galati and Lucier appeared on an episode of Restaurant Impossible to assist Irvine in one of his missions.

=== Irvine's sous chefs ===
- David Britton
- George Galati Jr.
- George Kralle
- Lee Lucier
- Shane Cash
- Barry Sexton
- Brian Goodman
- Darryl Moiles
- Carl Ruiz

=== Guest chefs ===
- Homaro Cantu – Molecular gastronomy expert and chef/owner of Moto restaurant in Chicago
- Guy Fieri – host of Diners, Drive-Ins and Dives, Guy's Big Bite, and Ultimate Recipe Showdown
- Jeff Henderson – host of The Chef Jeff Project
