= Jeff Henderson =

Jeff Henderson may refer to:

- Jeff Henderson (chef), American chef
- Jeff Henderson (long jumper) (born 1989), American long jumper
- Jeff Henderson (musician), member of Upper Hutt Posse
