= Family Style =

Family Style may refer to:

- Family Style (Vaughan Brothers album), 1990
- Family Style (Jet video album), 2004
- Family Style (TV series), a reality television series
- "Family Style" (Rules of Engagement), a 2009 television episode
