= Cake Girls =

Bakeries of the United States

Cake Girls was a specialty bakery business located in Chicago, Illinois. They are known for creating edible art cakes in the form of replicas of architectural landmarks and cultural icons. They have been featured on WE tv's Amazing Wedding Cakes and the Food Network's Last Cake Standing.

== The owners ==
The Cake Girls are Mary and Brenda Maher, sisters who were born and raised in Rochester, Michigan. As children, they both understood they had an artistic talent in creating different types of cake. As adults, they both spent time working at a bakery in Detroit, Michigan and rediscovered their passion for creating elaborate three-dimensional "sculpted" cakes for weddings and other special occasions. After a time in Detroit, the sisters decided they could do better with their own business in Chicago, and thus was born "Cake Girls".

== Food Network appearances ==
Mary and Brenda have made a number of appearances on the Food Network Challenge show and they are currently undefeated champions.

=== Food Network Challenge ===
Mary and Brenda Maher appeared on the "Simpsons Movie Cakes" episode of Food Network Challenge. Their opponents were as follows:

- Debbie Goard of Oakland, CA;
- Bronwen Weber of Dallas, TX — The second runner-up in this competition, she created a cake depicting The Simpsons Movie on a skateboard with Marge sitting on top;
- Tad Weliczko of New York City — His cake was a Homer Simpson statue that emulated an Academy Award "Oscar" statuette.

The cake that Cake Girls created was of Krusty the Clown. They were announced the winners at the end of the show and received the $10,000 prize.

Mary and Brenda Maher also appeared on the "Disney Princesses Cakes" episode of Food Network Challenge. Their opponents were as follows:

- Flora Aghababyan, assistant pastry chef, Bellagio Hotel in Paradise, Nevada — created a Cinderella cake;
- Norman Davis, owner, The Sweet Life in Annandale, Virginia — created a The Little Mermaid cake entitled "Ariel's Garden";
- Elizabeth Hodes, owner, Elizabeth Hodes Custom Cakes and Sugar Art in New York City — created a Princess Jasmine cake entitled "Flying High"; and
- Kate Sullivan, owner, Lovin Sullivan Cakes in New York City — created a Beauty and the Beast cake titled "Belle's Enchanted Evening".

Mary and Brenda created a Snow White cake and were announced the winners at the end of the show, winning $10,000.

=== Last Cake Standing ===
Last Cake Standing was a four-week competition for the title of the "Best Cake Artist of America" aired by Food Network. Each week, the competitors were given a task to complete in 24 hours. At the end of each task, one team was eliminated, until only the winner remained. In the initial Last Cake Standing competition in 2009, there were six teams, each headed by a chef: Michelle Bommarito (Ferndale, MI), Courtney Clark (Ann Arbor, MI), Mary Maher (Chicago, IL), James Rosselle (Los Angeles, CA), Elisa Strauss (New York, NY), and Bronwen Weber (Dallas, TX).

For the first episode, the challengers' task was to create a cake that depicted their lives. The challenge winner was the Cake Girls. Their cake was about Mary and her life as an artist, and how it transformed into her edible art cake-making today. In the second episode, the five remaining challengers were given the task of creating a wedding cake in only eight hours. The competitors got to meet with the couple who the wedding cake was being created for, but only for a short period of time. The newlyweds got the choose who their winner was and used the winning cake at their wedding reception.

In the third episode, the four remaining challengers had to create a superhero cake. The night before, each team was asked to create a superhero of their own. When the challenge came that next morning, they didn't have their usual aides that they had had for the previous challenges. Instead, the remaining four competitors were split into two teams, with their fellow competitors taking the place of separate aides. Each team had to create a superhero cake that incorporated both of the competitors' ideas. The winner was again Cake Girls. At the end of the show, the losing teams had to have a "cake-off" to determine who would advance into the finale.

The fourth episode was the final episode, and the three remaining competitors were given a 24-hour cake challenge. They had to create a 5-foot "Sweet 16" birthday cake for a set of sextuplets. Not only did the cakes have to individually represent each of the sextuplets, but the cakes also had to be delivered to the party within a time frame. The winner of the challenge was once again the Cake Girls, who were granted the title of "Best Cake Artist of America" in addition to their $50,000 winnings.

== Fire ==
A fire broke out on the Cake Girls bakery's second floor shortly after 5:30 am on March 29, 2010. The building, including the bakery, was deemed a total loss. The Cake Girls, and everyone in the building, were unharmed. They were forced to cancel 500 orders due to the lack of a space to create the cakes in.

== Re-branding ==
Following the demise of their bakery, Mary and Brenda Maher decided to re-brand themselves as a DIY party-planning and cake-making website. The site offers step-by-step instructions for a variety of projects, and also includes a shop where visitors can purchase party and baking supplies.
