= Knight Enterprises =

Canadian television production company

- Country: Canada
- Headquarters: Ottawa, Ontario

Ownership
- Owner: Gusto Worldwide Media

History
- Launched: May 7, 1996

Links
- Website: www.gustoworldwidemedia.com

Knight Enterprises is an independent television production and broadcasting company based in Ottawa, Ontario, Canada. Since it began in May 1996, Knight Enterprises has produced more than 400 half hours of television. Knight Enterprises is best known for food television series including "The Great Canadian Food Show," "Cook Like a Chef," "Licence to Grill," "Junk Brothers," as well as, "This Food That Wine". In December 2013, Knight Enterprises entered the broadcasting landscape with the launch of its first-ever television channel - Gusto.

== Programs ==
Knight Enterprises' first program was "The Great Canadian Food Show", which celebrates ethnic and regional influences on Canada's culinary heritage, features cuisine and scenery from every province and territory in Canada. Each episode highlights great Canadian food, as well as the people - from growers to chefs - who bring food to the table. This series has aired on Food Network Canada, CBC, TVA, and TVO, in addition to being sold to international broadcasters in more than 52 countries.

In January 2001, Knight Enterprises launched its second food show - "Cook Like a Chef," a series about how to cook. Several of Canada's top chefs show that gourmet food is not difficult to create. Chefs create dishes from the ground up while demonstrating cooking tips, techniques and skills. They cover everything from clarifying butter to how to make the perfect turkey.

"Licence to Grill" addresses summer backyard entertaining and barbecue fares such as hamburgers, steaks, kebabs, leg of lamb, sides of fish, and grilled desserts. Knight Enterprises also produced a one-hour winter BBQ special spin-off from the series. License to Grill featured Rob Rainford, a Canadian chef. Shown on the US cooking channel, at the height of its popularity, he was featured on various US networks. The original show ended after 5 seasons in 2007. In 2016, a 6th season was launched on the Gusto network, with Rob Rainford hosting again.

Junk Brothers is about furniture resurrection and transformation. Brothers Jim and Steve Kelley secretly patrol the streets saving cast-off furniture from the refuse bin. They whisk the items away to their workshop and transform the trash into incredible pieces of furniture that maintain at least a hint of their former battered selves. Once complete, our dynamic duo silently returns the restored pieces to their original homes and watch as the homeowners are dazzled and mystified at the surprise restoration before them: they've just had a visit from the Junk Brothers. The series aired on HGTV in both Canada and the United States, as well as several other markets around the world.

"This Food That Wine" is the ultimate wine and food pairing experience. In every episode, hosts Angie & Stacey meet up with someone planning a party (birthday, games night, bachelorette party, homecoming, etc.). They get together in Angie's kitchen for a day of menu planning, cooking and wine pairing. Then, armed with recipes and a wine list, our "guest du jour" returns to home to cook up a feast and bask in the adulation of his/her happy guests.

"Road Grill" is the ultimate barbecue roadshow that features tips and techniques on how to prepare the best barbecue. Each episode features host Matt Dunigan on the road in a different location cooking great barbecue fare as well as preparing rubs, sauces and marinades. Road Grill aired between 2009 and 2011 on the Food Network Canada

While propelling forward with these innovative programs, Knight Enterprises continues to develop new series including multiple new projects for Food Network Canada, Life Network Canada, and CTV. The company is also positioning itself to be a leader in content development for the mobile media markets.

== Gusto TV ==
On December 11, 2013, Knight Enterprises launched Gusto, a lifestyle specialty channel devoted to food, travel and design. The channel features top-rated food and lifestyle programming from around the world as well as original content from Knight Enterprises' library of shows.

In May 2016, it was announced that Bell Media would be acquiring the Canadian rights to the Gusto brand and license the original programming produced by Knight Enterprises for the channel. As a result of the agreement with Bell Media, Knight Enterprises' Gusto channel shut down and Bell Media launched their own Gusto branded service on September 1, 2016.

The brand's parent company, Gusto Worldwide Media (GWM), will license Gusto TV's current programming to Bell Media in addition to producing future series for the channel. GWM will continue to own international rights to the Gusto brand and announced plans to launch an internet television service under the brand in 2017.

== Awards ==
Both "Cook Like a Chef" and "The Great Canadian Food Show" have been nominated multiple times for James Beard Awards. They have also respectively earned several nominations for Gemini Awards. "Cook Like a Chef" was most recently nominated for Best Television Food and/or Drink Show at the World Food Media Awards as well as for a Gemini for Best Direction in a Lifestyle/Practical Information Program or Series. "The Great Canadian Food Show" was most recently nominated for a Gemini as the Best Lifestyle/General Interest Series.
