= Medieval Mayhem (disambiguation) =

Medieval Mayhem is an Atari 2600 video game.

Medieval Mayhem may also refer to:

- "Medieval Mayhem", a Dinner: Impossible episode
- "Medieval Mayhem", a segment of the 2009 Mythbusters episode "Exploding Bumper"
- "Medieval Mayhem", a game level of Crash Bash
- Slayers Medieval Mayhem, Slayers manga title
