= Steven Raichlen =

American culinary writer, chef, television host, and novelist

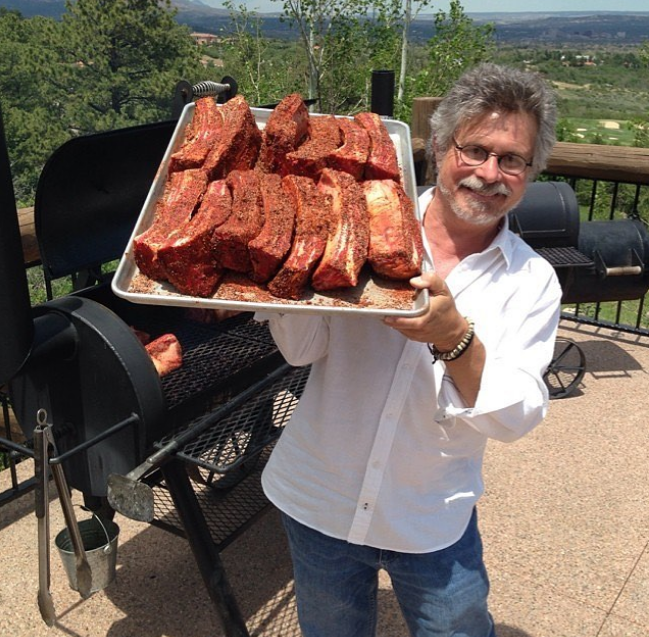
- Steven Raichlen holding a plate of beef ribs during a Barbecue University session
- Born: March 11, 1953 (age 73); Nagoya, Japan
- Education: Reed College (BA)
- Occupations: Culinary writer; chef; tv host; novelist
- Spouse: Barbara Raichlen

Steven Raichlen (born March 11, 1953) is an American culinary writer, TV host, and novelist.

== Early life ==
Raichlen was born in Nagoya, Japan. He grew up in Baltimore, Maryland, in the United States. He is Jewish.

== Education ==
In 1975, Raichlen earned a Bachelor of Arts in French literature from Reed College. He received a Thomas J. Watson Foundation Fellowship to study medieval cooking in Europe, and was offered a Fulbright Scholarship to study comparative literature. He trained at Le Cordon Bleu and La Varenne cooking schools in Paris.

== Writing ==
Since 1998, Raichlen's books have focused on the culture and practice of global grilling. His 31 books include The Barbecue Bible (1998, revised in 2008), How to Grill (2001), BBQ USA, Healthy Latin Cooking, Project Smoke and Project Fire. His books have been translated into 17 languages. Raichlen also wrote Planet Barbecue!, the story of his travels to more than 50 countries in search of the best barbecue, published by Workman Publishing in 2010.

Raichlen has written for The New York Times, National Geographic Traveler, Food & Wine, Bon Appétit and Esquire magazines.

Raichlen has been known to further careers of barbecue pitmasters thanks to his writing, including Wayne Mark Schafer, of Baltimore's Pit Beef fame Big Fat Daddy's, who was featured in Raichlen's NY Times article and 425 Fiery Recipes book.

In 2012, he released his first novel, Island Apart, about a Chappaquiddick hermit's developing relationship with a cancer patient.

== Television career ==
Raichlen created the TV show Barbecue University (aka BBQ U), which aired for four seasons from 2003 to 2006 on American Public Television. From 2008 to 2010 he hosted Primal Grill, again on American Public Television. Primal Grill focused on the "how-tos" of live fire cooking, employing different grills for each technique. In 2015, he created Project Smoke on public television, focusing on traditional and cutting-edge techniques in smoked food. and more recently Steven Raichlen's Project Fire. Raichlen also hosts the French-language TV shows Le Maitre du Grill and Les Incontourables du BBQ on Zeste in Quebec. His Steven Raichlen Grills Italy show was launched on Gambero Rosso Channel in Italy in 2018.

He battled and defeated Iron Chef Rokusaburo Michiba in a "Battle of the Barbecue Gods" on Japanese television.

He has appeared on numerous television programs and networks including Good Morning America, The Today Show, CBS This Morning, Discovery Channel, Oprah, Regis & Kelly, The View and CNN.

== Other work ==
Raichlen is the founder of Barbecue University, which offers three-day intensive courses on live fire cooking at the Broadmoor Resort in Colorado Springs.

== Awards and honors ==
Raichlen has won five James Beard awards for his cookbooks. High-Flavor, Low-Fat Cooking won the 1993 award for Best Light and Healthy Cookbook, and his follow-up, High-Flavor, Low-Fat Vegetarian Cooking, won the 1996 award for Best Vegetarian Cookbook. In 1999, Healthy Latin Cooking won the award for Healthy Focus. He also earned the 2001 James Beard Foundation/KitchenAid Book Award for his Healthy Jewish Cooking His 780-page book, BBQ USA, won the 2004 award for Tools and Techniques.

In 2015, Raichlen was inducted into the Barbecue Hall of Fame. In 2003, Bon Appetit named Raichlen “Cooking Teacher of the Year," the same year that The Barbecue Bible, based on his four years of research while traveling 150,000 miles through 25 countries on five continents, won an IACP Julia Child Award.

== Personal life ==
Raichlen's wife is Barbara Raichlen. They live in Coconut Grove, Florida and Martha's Vineyard, Massachusetts.

== Publications ==
=== Nonfiction ===
- A Taste of the Mountains Cooking School Cookbook ISBN 978-0671544287 Poseidon Press, 1986
- A Celebration of the Seasons: A Cooks Almanac ISBN 978-0671624989 Poseidon Press, 1988
- Steven Raichlen's High-Flavor, Low-Fat Cooking. ISBN 978-0944475317. 1992.
- Miami Spice : The New Florida Cuisine. ISBN 1-56305-346-2. 1993.
- The Caribbean Pantry Cookbook: Condiments and Seasonings from the Land of Spice and Sun. ISBN 978-1885183101. 1995.
- Steven Raichlen's High-Flavor, Low-Fat Vegetarian Cooking. ISBN 0-14-024124-8. 1995.
- Steven Raichlen's High-Flavor, Low-Fat Chicken. ISBN 978-0670865802. 1996.
- Steven Raichlen's High-Flavor, Low-Fat Pasta Cookbook. ISBN 978-0670865819. 1996.
- Steven Raichlen's High-Flavor, Low Fat Italian Food Cookbook. ISBN 978-0670874439. 1997.
- Steven Raichlen's High-Flavor, Low Fat Appetizers. ISBN 978-0670871353. 1997.
- Steven Raichlen's High-Flavor, Low Fat Desserts. ISBN 978-0670871360. 1997.
- The Barbecue! Bible. ISBN 1-56305-866-9. 1998.
- Steven Raichlen's High-Flavor, Low-Fat Mexican Cooking. ISBN 978-0670883882. 1999.
- Barbecue! Bible : Sauces, Rubs, and Marinades, Bastes, Butters, and Glazes. ISBN 0-7611-1979-5. 2000.
- Steven Raichlen's Healthy Latin Cooking : 200 Sizzling Recipes from Mexico, Cuba, Caribbean, Brazil, and Beyond. ISBN 0-87596-498-2. 2000.
- Healthy Jewish Cooking. ISBN 978-0670893126. 2000.
- How to Grill: The Complete Illustrated Book of Barbecue Techniques, A Barbecue Bible! Cookbook. ISBN 9780761120148. 2001.
- Beer-Can Chicken: And 74 Other Offbeat Recipes for the Grill. ISBN 0-7611-2016-5. 2002.
- BBQ USA: 425 Fiery Recipes from All Across America. ISBN 978-0761120155. 2003.
- Steven Raichlen's Big Flavor Cookbook: 440 Irresistible and Healthy Recipes from Around the World. ISBN 978-1579123291. 2003.
- Indoor Grilling. ISBN 978-0761133353. 2004.
- The Best of Barbecue University by Steven Raichlen. DVD/Video. 2005.
- Raichlen on Ribs, Ribs, Outrageous Ribs. ISBN 0-7611-4211-8. 2006.
- Planet Barbecue! ISBN 9780761148012. 2010.
- Bold & Healthy Flavors: 450 Recipes from Around the World ISBN 978-1579128555. 2011.
- Man Made Meals: The Essential Cookbook for Guys ISBN 978-0761166443. 2014.
- Project Smoke ISBN 9780761181866. 2016.
- Project Fire ISBN 9781523502769. 2018.
- The Brisket Chronicles ISBN 9781523507795. 2019.

=== Fiction ===
- Island Apart ISBN 9780765332387, 2012.
