= Bronwen Weber =

American pastry chef and cake decorator

Bronwen Weber is a Canadian-born pastry chef and renowned cake decorator based in Dallas, Texas.

Born in Calgary, Alberta, over her 30-year career Weber has worked at a variety of bakeries and won numerous awards, including the Oklahoma State Sugar Art Show grand prize in the wedding cake division. She is a frequent competitor on Food Network Challenge cake decorating competitions, having competed over twenty times.

Bronwen currently runs her own cake business serving the DFW region called Bronwen Cakes.
