= List of Food Network Challenge episodes =

This is the list of the episodes for the American cooking television series and competition Food Network Challenge, broadcast on Food Network.

== Season 1 ==
#	Title	Episodes
1	Wedding Cake Challenge	7-1-2003
2	Birthday Cake Competition	7-8-2003
3	Vegas Pastry Battle	7-15-2003
4	Chocolate Competition	7-22-2003
5	Pizza Battle	7-22-2003
6	Spooky Cake & Candy Cook-Off	7-29-2003
7	Holiday Cake-Off	8-6-2003
8	Designer Wedding Cake Cook-Off	8-13-2003
9	Army Cook-Off	8-20-2003
10	Navy Chef Challenge	8-27-2003
11	Al Roker's BBQ Showdown	9-3-2003
12	The Road to Bocuse d'Or	9-10-2010
13	Going for the Gold: Bocuse d'Or	9-17-2003
14	Bocuse d'Or: A Pussies Dream	9-24-2003
15	Food Network Pastry Daredevils	10-1-2003
16	Mystery Cake	10-8-2003
17	Fire & Ice	
18	Elvis Birthday Cakes	
19	Texas Steak Cook-Off	
20	National Pie Championship	04-11-2005
21	Memphis in May BBQ	11-14-2005
22	Campfire Cook-Off	11-11-2005
23	World Pastry Championship	11-11-2005
24	Seafood Cook-Off	
25	Teen Chef	
26	Southern Living Showdown	
27	Reno Rib Cook-Off	
28	America's Bread Battle	
29	Build a Better Burger	
30	Wedding Cake Classic	
31	Gingerbread Championship	
32	World's Best Bartender	
33	U.S. BBQ Championship	
34	$50,000 Pastry Challenge	
35	The Chili Competition	
36	Cook & Ladder Competition	
37	Fiery Foods Challenge	
38	Culinary Team USA	
39	World's Best Pastry	
40	BBQ Bootcamp	
41	The BBQ Circuit	
42	Chocolate Festival Fantasies	
43	Cowboy Cook-Off	
44	BBQ Country Cook-Off	
45	Big Island Cook-Off	
46	The National Chicken Cook-Off	
47	Great Chowder Cook-Off	
48	America's Best Pastry	
49	Great Garlic Cook-Off	
50	Big Beef Battle	
51	Chili Bowl	
52	The Great American Pie Cook-Off	
53	Varsity Cook-Off	
54	The Spam Cook-Off	
55	World Pizza Challenge	
56	Wild Game Cook-Off	
57	Best Young Chefs in America	
58	Culinary Champions	
59	Here Comes the Cake	
60	The Great Steak Cook-Off	
61	Royal BBQ Battle	
62	All Fired Up!	
63	Extreme Pastry	
64	Cowboy Challenge	
65	Big Pig Jig	
66	BBQ Chili Challenge	
67	The Great Cake-Off	
68	Slam Dunk Skillet Showdown	
69	World Bartending Championship	
70	Gilroy Garlic Cook-Off	
71	Gingerbread Challenge	
72	Gordon Elliott's Door Knock Dinner College Cook-Off	
73	Keep on Shucking	
74	Master Chefs	
75	National Pastry Team Championship	
76	Pillsbury Kids Bake-Off	
77	Southern Living Cook-Off	
78	All-American Tailgating Cook-Off	
79	World Baking Cup	
80	World Pastry Cup	
81	World Pastry Cup: Sweet Rewards	

== Season 2 ==
#	Title
1	$100,000 Chicken Challenge
2	Cupcake
3	Food Network Chocolate Fantasy Challenge
4	Food Network Pastry Daredevils
5	Build a Better Burger 2
6	Disney Dream Desserts
7	Ultimate Wedding Cakes
8	Gingerbread Champions
9	Incredible Edible Mansions
10	Rock & Roll Pastry

== Season 3 ==
#	Title
1	Sugar Showdown
2	Celebration Cakes
3
4	Hot Chefs
5	Cookies
6	Birthday Cake Surprise
7	Ultimate Thanksgiving Feast
8	Candy Castles
9	Cereal Skylines (100th episode)
10	Pizza Champions
11	Sugar Skyscrapers
12	Flying Knives

== Season 4 ==
#	Title
1	Fantasy Fruit Sculptures
2	Luau Beach BBQ
3	World Championship Steak Cook-Off
4	Cartoon Cakes
5	Fastest Foods
6	World Pastry Team Championship
7	Popcorn Giants
8	The Great American Seafood Cook-Off II
9	The Cake Awards
10	Award Cakes
11	Build a Better Burger III
12	Chocolate Runway Challenge
13	Wedding Cake Surprise
14	National Wedding Cake Championship

== Season 5 ==
#	Title
1	Edible Ornaments
2	Princess Cakes
3	Villain Cakes
4	Great American Pie Cook-Off
5	Haunted Gingerbread House
6	Sweet 16
7	Extreme Cakes
8	Simpsons Movie Cake
9	Mac and Cheese
10	Super Heroes
11	National Chicken Cook-Off
12	World Championship BBQ Cook-Off
13	National Beef Cook-Off

== Season 6 ==
#	Title
1	Outrageous Pumpkins
2	Mystery Client Cakes
3	Chocolate Landmarks
4	Dr. Seuss Cake Extrodinaire
5	Surprise Engagement Cake
6	The Rematch: Fantasy Fruit Sculpture
7	Superstar Food Stylists
8	Disney/Pixar Cakes
9	Cirque du Soleil Cakes
10	Pillsbury Bake-Off
11	Dr. Seuss Cakes

== Season 7 ==
#	Title
1	American Pie Festival
2	Big Bash Caterers
3	Ice Cream Clash
4	Tag Team Cakes
5	Extreme Holiday Cakes
6	The Next Great Chef
7	Big City Cakes
8	Cereal Bridges
9	Battle of the Brides
10	Birthday Bombshell
11	Chocolate Masterpieces
12	Italian Family Feast
13	America's Best Burger

== Season 8 ==
#	Title
1	Disney Celebration Cakes
2	Miley Cyrus' Sweet 16 Cakes
3	Surprise Birthday Cakes
4	Blind Date Cakes
5	Disney Classics Cakes
6	Last Cake Standing: Personal Best Cakes
7	Last Cake Standing: Elopement Cakes
8	Last Cake Standing: Extreme Superhero Cakes
9	Last Cake Standing: Sweet 16 Sextuplets
10	Shrek Cakes
11	Extreme Candy Carnivals
12	Ice Age Cakes

== Season 9 ==
#	Title
1	Food Magicians
2	Sesame Street Cakes
3	Fashion Cakes
4	Amazing Pie Championship
5	Edible Cities
6	Cereal Bridges 2
7	Fantasy Vacation Cakes
8	Sugar Adventures
9	Newlywed Cakes

== Season 10 ==
#	Title			
1	Beauty Pageant Cakes	03-11-2010	2	Extreme Cakes 4
3	Chocolate Wonders			
4	Incredible Anniversary Cakes	03-11-2010	5cam	SpongeBob Birthday Cakes
6	Extreme Villain Cakes			
7	Sugar Impossible			
8	High School Reunion Cakes			
9	Sex and the City 2 Cakes			
10	All Star Grill-Off			
11	Toy Story 3 Cakes			
12	Extreme Candy Coasters	03-11-2010	13	Paranormal Cakes

== Season 11 ==
#	Title
1	Rock and Roll Hall of Fame Cakes
2	Food Landscapes
3	Ultimate Cookie Clash
4	Dora the Explorer Cakes
5	Roller Derby Cakes
6	Runaway Chocolate
7	Disney Beauty and the Beast Cakes
8	Outrageous Pumpkins 2
9	Flying Sugar
10	Extreme Urban Legend Cakes
11	Giant Wedding Cakes
12	Thanksgiving Family Face-Off (200th episode)
13	Holiday Windows
14	Sugar Destinations

== Season 12 ==
#	Title
1	Monster Bugs
2	Standup Comedy Cakes
3	Chocolate Surprise Proposal
4	Best in Show Cakes
5	Extreme Mardi Gras Cakes
6	Demolition Derby Cakes
7	Easter Cakes
8	Donut Champions
9	Sugar Inventions
10	Sugar and Candy Fashion
11	WWE Wrestling Cakes
12	Wild West Chocolate
13	Romance Novel Cakes

== Season 13 ==
#	Title
1	Awesome 80's Cakes
2	Star Wars Cakes
3	Chocolate Myths
4	The Smurfs Movie Cakes
5	Renaissance Festival Cakes
6	Extreme Dinosaur Cakes
7	Extreme Pirate Cakes
8	Lion King Cakes
9	Extreme Alien Cakes
10	Halloween Ghost Story Cakes
11	LEGO Cakes
12	Charlie Brown Thanksgiving Cakes
13	Christmas Classics
