= Charlie Luxton =

English architect

Charlie Luxton is an architectural designer and television presenter who writes and speaks about the environment and sustainable architecture.

== Early life and education ==
Luxton was born in Australia in April 1974. His family moved to England when he was ten years old.

Luxton studied at Oxford Brookes University during the 1990s and earned a BA in architecture. He completed an MA at the Royal College of Art in London.

== Work ==
In 2000, Luxton hosted the documentary series Modern British Architects on the United Kingdom's Channel 5.

Luxton went on to present several more architecture-related shows, including 'Treehouses' for Sky1, a six-part television series, Our Homes and Property, and the ongoing series Build a New Life in the Country. He is a regular designer on BBC1's DIY SOS.

His series The Great Treehouse Challenge aired on Sky's Living Channel. Another show, Homes by the Sea, on More4 TV, was hosted by Luxton. His show Building the Dream was shown on More4 TV. He was also co-presenter of Dreamspaces. A BBC documentary TV series about architecture and interior design. The series ran for two seasons and had twelve episodes total. The show was broadcast on BBC Three from 2003 to 2004. The presenters of Dreamspaces were David Adjaye, Justine Frischmann and Charlie Luxton.

Luxton's design company 'Charlie Luxton Design' creates sustainable living projects in London, Wiltshire and the Cotswolds.

Luxton has also supported several eco-friendly projects in his local area, including creating a carpool, fitting solar panels onto the roof of the local school, addressing amateur homebuilders and green-furbishing thirty houses.

== Personal life ==
Luxton is married and has two children.

Their home includes many of the sustainable living solutions that are featured on his television show.
