= Film Garden =

Television production company

Film Garden Entertainment, more commonly known as Film Garden, is a TV production company that produced TV programs for Discovery Health Channel (now Oprah Winfrey Network) and WE tv such as Platinum Weddings, which spawned a spin-off, Amazing Wedding Cakes and A Wedding Story. Film Garden Entertainment specializes in reality and documentary programs.

== Shows Produced ==
Film Garden Entertainment is the productions company behind The Secret World Of..., a documentary-style series aired on TLC (The Learning Channel) around the late 1990s. The series explored the inner workings of various industries and subcultures—such as amusement parks, cruise ships, gambling, sitcoms, and daredevils—by presenting behind-the-scenes content. Each hour-long episode featured interviews, archival material, and other resources intended to provide insight into these topics.

Examples of shows from The Secret World Of... series that aired on TLC (The Learning Channel):

- The Secret World Of Professional Wrestling - A 1998 documentary that examines various aspects of American professional wrestling, including its presentation, business structure, and backstage operations. The documentary includes interviews with wrestlers such as Vandal Drummond, Dan Farren, and Johnny Legend, offering perspectives on the physical and emotional aspects of professional wrestling.
- The Secret World of Monster Trucks - A 1999 documentary that provides an overview of the monster truck motorsport, focusing on the vehicles, events, and individuals involved in the industry. The program includes commentary from drivers, mechanics, and event organizers, offering insight into the culture and business of the sport.
- The Secret World Of Strippers - A 2000 documentary that presents an overview of the exotic dancing industry in the United States through interviews and personal accounts. The program addresses public attitudes and stereotypes surrounding the profession, highlighting how some individuals view it as a form of empowerment or economic opportunity. It provides a look into the day-to-day realities of working in strip clubs, including performance preparation and interactions with patrons. Strippers from Bad Girl Productions and other exotic dancers were featured on this show.

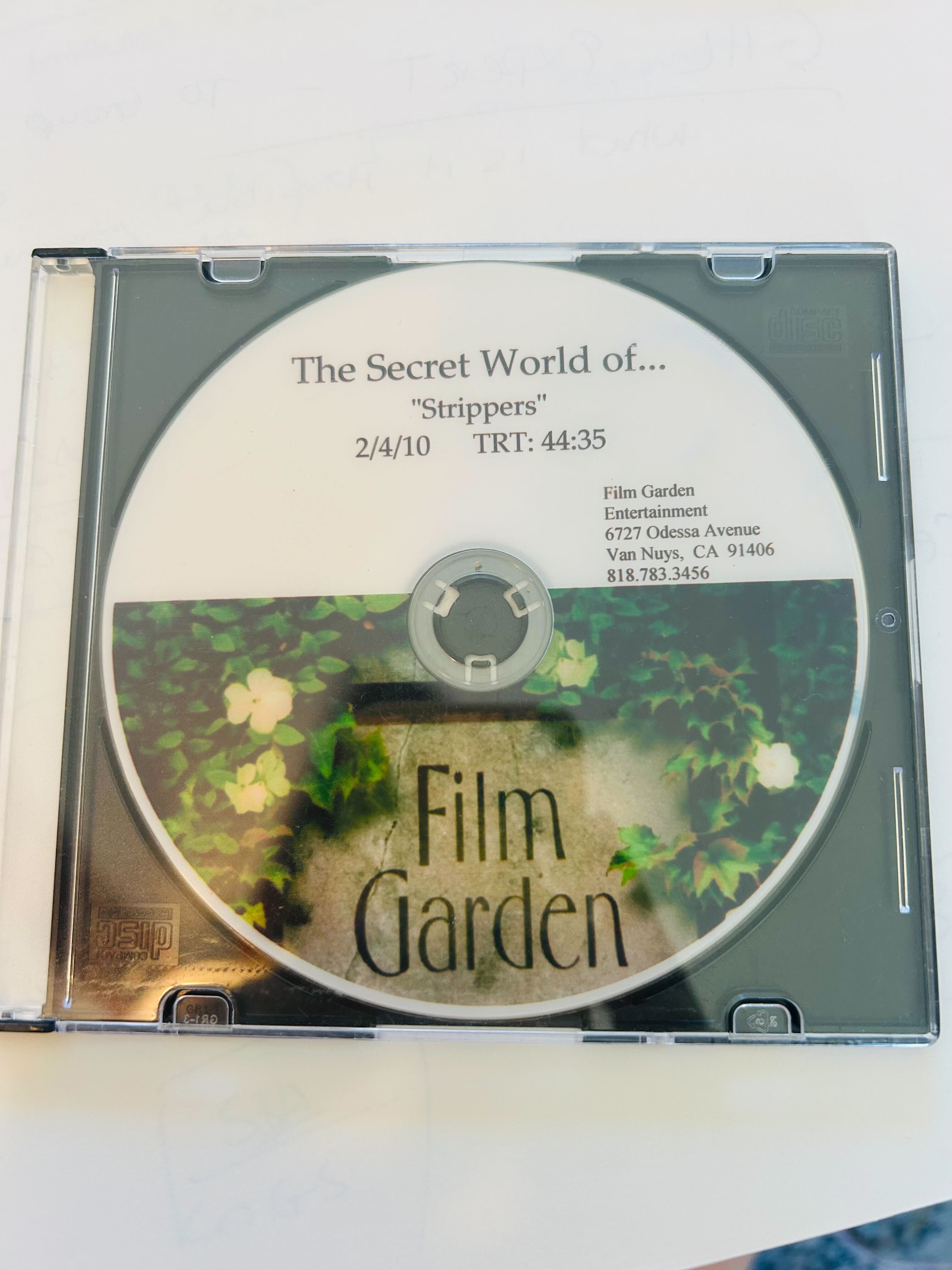
CD of the Secret Life of Strippers show.
