= Keegan Gerhard =

German chef

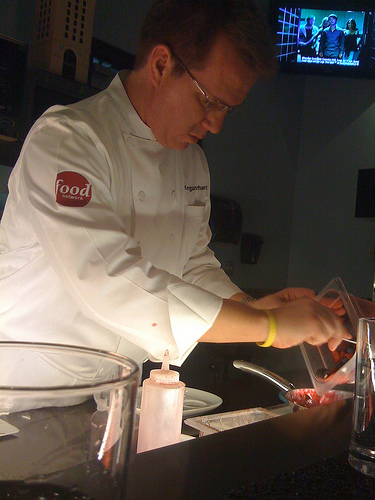
- Keegan Gerhard
- Born: 2 December 1963 (age 62); Bad Homburg vor der Höhe, West Germany
- Education: finance
- Culinary career
- Cooking style: American Comfort Food
- Current restaurant(s): D Bar Restaurant Denver, CO www.dbardenver.com
- Television show: Food Network Challenge

Keegan Gerhard (born December 2, 1969) is an American pastry chef and the former host of the Food Network series Food Network Challenge. As of the tenth season, he has been replaced by Claire Robinson. Instead of being the host, he serves as a judge alongside Kerry Vincent. Gerhard along with wife are the owners and executive chefs of D Bar Desserts in Denver, Colorado and San Diego (closed).
