= Breitbach's Country Dining =

Historic restaurant in Iowa

Coordinates: 42.638026°N 90.868308°W

Breitbach's Country Dining is a casual dining restaurant and bar located in the town of Balltown in Dubuque County, Iowa, United States. Breitbach's is the oldest continuously operating restaurant and bar in the state of Iowa, having been open since August 23, 1852. The establishment has been owned and operated by the Breitbach family since 1862. The current owner is Mike Breitbach.

Breitbach's is located at 563 Balltown Road in Balltown. The place offers classic Midwestern dishes, including German ethnic foods such as sauerkraut, sausage, and coleslaw. It has been featured in an episode of Food Network's Feasting on Asphalt 2: The River Run, which showcased the restaurant's quality pies, as well as the 2012 documentary Spinning Plates.

== History ==
Several sources disagree with the 1852 opening date and the date of acquisition by the Breitbach family. According to Midwest Living, Breitbach's opened in 1853 as a stagecoach stop. On the other hand, KOA says: "Founded in 1852 under a permit issued from President Millard Fillmore, it's been owned by the Breitbachs since 1891 and is in its sixth generation of family ownership." They also indicate there was an antiques store on the premises. The opening date of 1852 and family acquisition in 1862 is supported by the history related on the restaurant's own website.

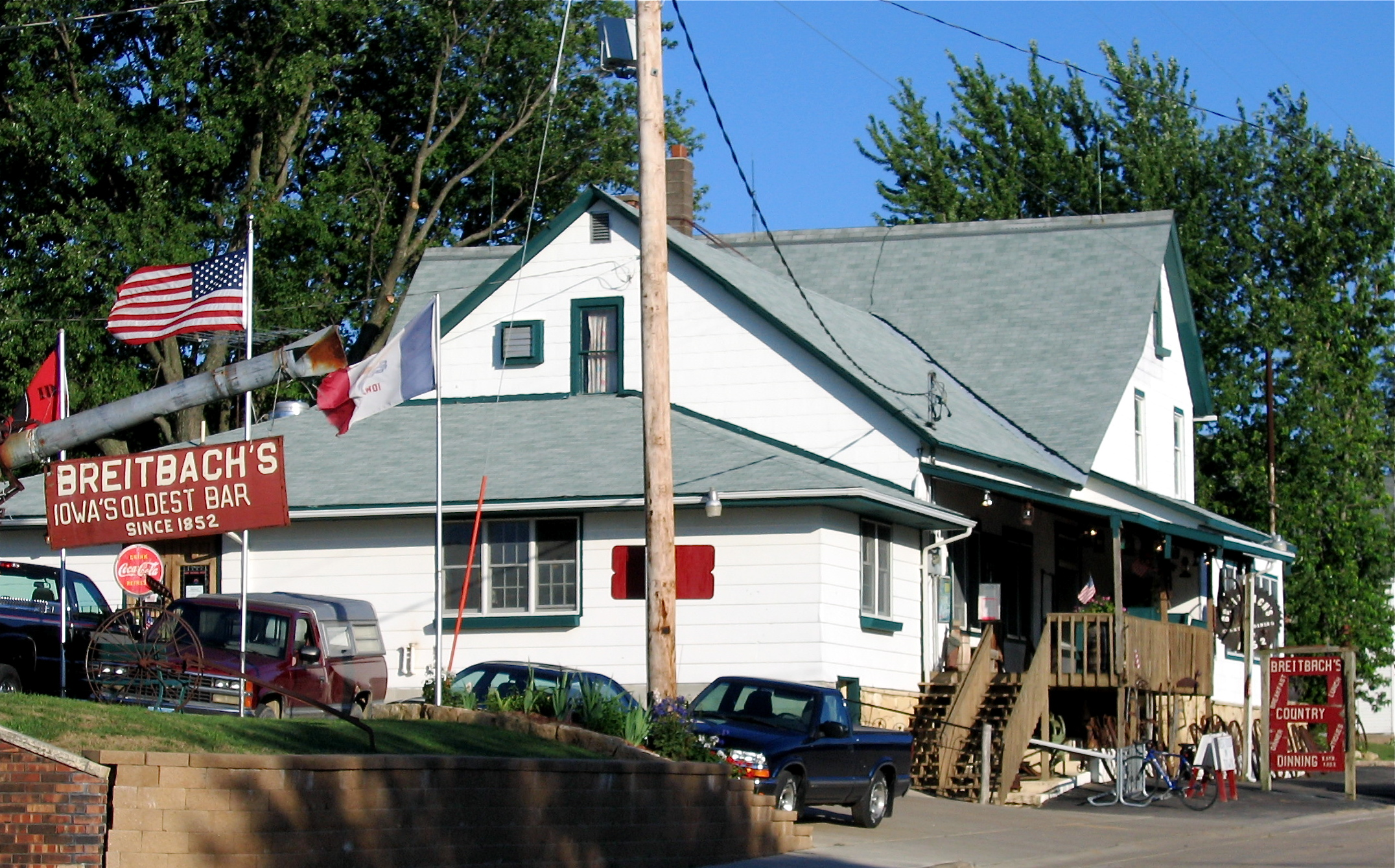
The original restaurant building, in use until the fire of December 24, 2007. Photo by Joe Schallan, July 28, 2005.

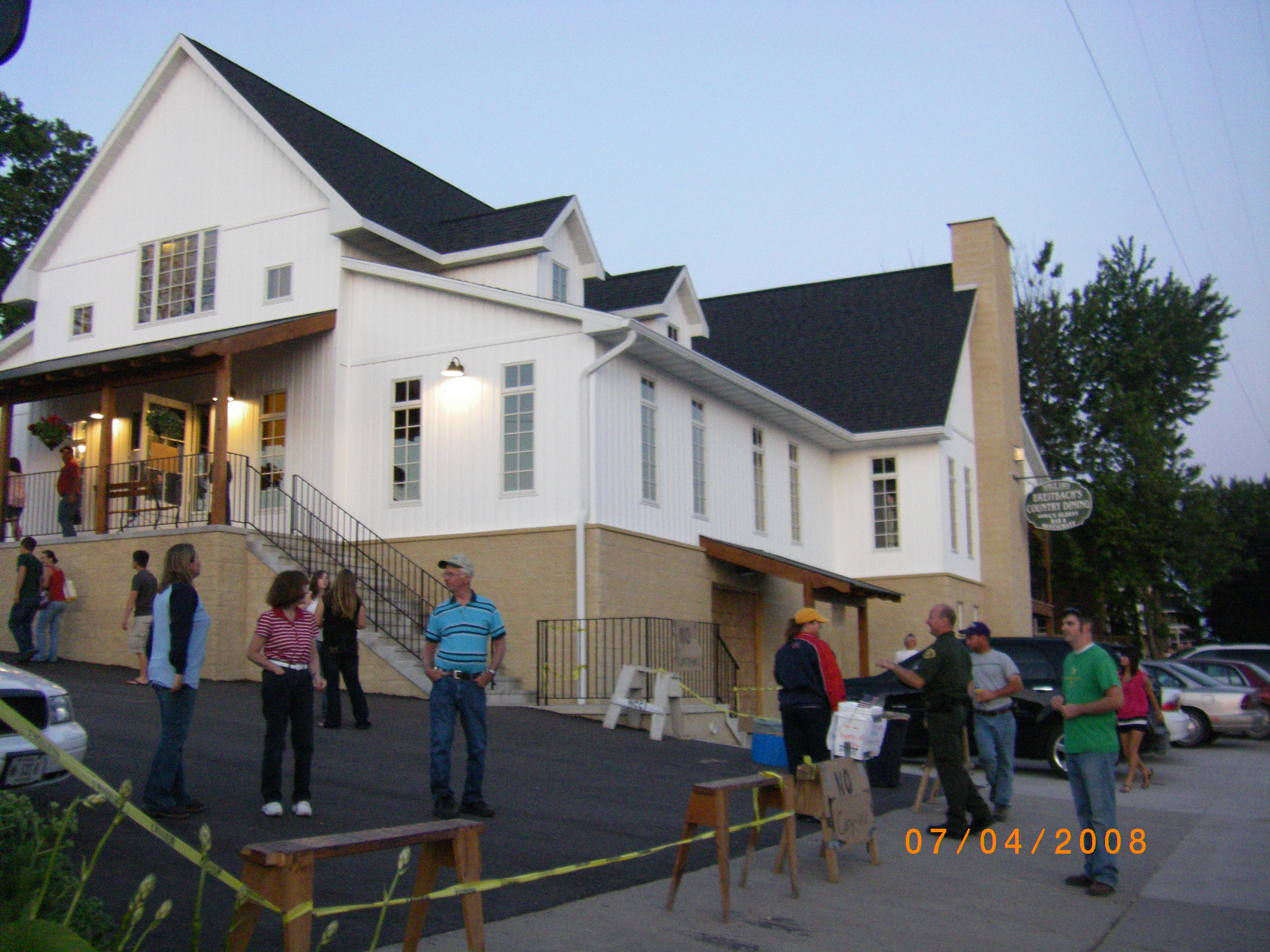
The second restaurant, shown on Independence Day, 2008. It opened on June 14, 2008 but was destroyed by fire on October 24, 2008, after a little over four months of operation. A third building was constructed in 2009 and opened on August 1 of that year.

In the 1920s, a traveling group of gypsies came by. In exchange for food and lodging, one of them painted a mural on the barroom wall of the view of the Mississippi valley as seen from the property. The mural was later walled over and forgotten. Later still a remodeling effort uncovered the mural, which was restored, covered with glass and illuminated. It was a long-time feature of the restaurant.

== Fires ==
=== Christmas Eve 2007 fire ===
Somewhat before 7:30am CST on December 24, 2007, an explosion occurred in the basement, and the building was completely destroyed despite the efforts of firefighters from four different departments. While almost everything within the building was lost, none of the employees in the building were injured. On Wednesday, December 26, investigators from the Dubuque County sheriff's office, the insurance company, and the state fire marshal's office investigated the remains of the restaurant. Following this investigation, authorities stated that the exact cause of the fire was undetermined, but it was nothing other than an accident. Authorities stated that a gas leak could not be ruled out. Breitbach announced his intention to rebuild the establishment as soon as possible.

Prior to the fire, the Democratic Party intended to hold the district 41 Democratic caucus at Breitbach's. The fire forced the caucus for that district to be moved to Sageville School.

By March 2008 construction work began on the new structure. The new building, designed by Flor2 Inc. of Des Moines, would feature larger restrooms, a modern kitchen, and other modern amenities but would maintain much of the look and feel of the original structure.

Construction of the new restaurant took 69 days. Breitbach's reopened on June 14, 2008.

=== October 2008 fire ===
By mid-October 2008, during the peak of autumn tourism in Iowa, Breitbach's reported greater business than ever before. Owner Mike Breitbach claimed that business had quadrupled since the Christmas Eve fire, noting, "For lunch yesterday we had 857 people." However, one week later, around 3:30am CDT on October 24, 2008, Breitbach's was once again completely destroyed by fire. Again, no injuries occurred.

On January 28, 2009 it was announced that Breitbach's would rebuild. Breitbach's Country Dining re-opened in its third building on August 1, 2009.

== See also ==
- List of James Beard America's Classics
- List of the oldest restaurants in the United States
