= Quick Fix Meals with Robin Miller =

- Starring: Robin Miller
- Country of origin: United States
- No. of episodes: 15

Production
- Running time: 30 minutes

Original release
- Network: Food Network

Quick Fix Meals with Robin Miller is an American television program on the Food Network hosted by Robin Miller.

Robin Miller who is a food writer and nutritionist, offers recipes and techniques specifically healthy meals, to fit a busy lifestyle, with no time to spare. Miller guides viewers on getting food on the table every night, with the planning strategies she offers on the show. On each episode she offers a shopping list so you can visit the supermarket once, and get the meal done right and quick.
