= Robin Miller (chef) =

American television host

- Education: Master's degree in Food and Nutrition, New York University, 1998
- Culinary career
- Television show(s): Quick Fix Meals with Robin Miller

Robin Miller is a food writer and TV host.

== Publication work ==
Miller was a contributor to the magazine Cooking Light and her work has appeared in other health and fitness publications.

== Television ==
Miller 's show, Real Life Cooking, launched on NBC Universal-owned Bluprint in January 2018.

The theme of Miller's cooking show Quick Fix Meals with Robin Miller is to provide strategies on how to prepare "stress-free" meals. The strategies provided are tips to help viewers to prepare healthy meals with the least amount of effort required.

== Bibliography ==
- Robin Takes 5 for Busy Families, Andrews McMeel, August 2013
- Robin Takes 5, Andrews McMeel, 2011
- Robin Rescues Dinner, Potter, 2009
- Robin to the Rescue, Taunton, 2008
- Quick Fix Meals, Taunton, 2007
- Picnics, Potter, 2005
- Verdure, Potter, 2001
- The Newlywed Cookbook, Sourcebooks, 1991, 1999, and 2013
- The Daily Soup, Hyperion, 1999 Jane Fonda, Cooking for Healthy Living (1996).
- Jane Fonda, Cooking for Healthy Living, Turner, 1996
