= 5 Ingredient Fix =

- Starring: Claire Robinson
- Country of origin: United States
- No. of seasons: 6
- No. of episodes: 71

Production
- Producer: Rock Shrimp Productions
- Running time: 30 minutes

Original release
- Network: Food Network
- Release: April 4, 2009 – July 16, 2011

5 Ingredient Fix is a television series starring Claire Robinson, the premise of which is that she creates entrées solely from five main ingredients.
