= The Barbecue Bible =

- Cover of first (1998) edition
- Author: Steven Raichlen
- Language: English
- Subject: Culinary Arts
- Genre: non-fiction
- Publisher: Workman Publishing
- Publication date: 1998 (1ed), 2008 (2ed)
- Publication place: United States
- Media type: book
- Pages: 572
- ISBN: 1-56305-866-9
- OCLC: 38879312
- Followed by: The Barbecue Bible: Sauces, Rubs and Marinades

The Barbecue Bible by Steven Raichlen (1998, Workman), is the flagship title in a series of cookbooks written on grilling, barbecue, and other forms of outdoor cooking. Rather than focusing specifically on one style of barbecue, Raichlen documented four years worth of travels along what he considered the great "barbecue belts" in the world, which he categorized as North America/Caribbean, South America, Central Asia/Middle East, Mediterranean Europe, the western regions of Africa from Morocco to South Africa, and the eastern Pacific Rim from Korea to Indonesia. In addition to grill recipes for both meat and vegetables, the book includes substantial information on side dishes, drinks, and desserts, as well as numerous sidebars detailing Raichlen's experiences while researching the book.

The second edition of the flagship book was released in May 2008, and incorporated substantial amounts of color photography in a style similar to the earlier How To Grill book.

The books do not tie in directly to Raichlen's television show Barbecue U, although they do share the same subject matter.

== Reception ==
Critics in The New York Times Magazine, the Orlando Sentinel, and the Pittsburgh Post-Gazette reviewed the book, among others.

== Other books in series ==
In addition to the first book in 1998, the Barbecue Bible series includes several more in-depth single or narrow-subject books:

- Barbecue Bible: Sauces, Rubs and Marinades (2000, ISBN 0-7611-1979-5);
- How To Grill (2001, ISBN 0-7611-2014-9), with step-by-step photography demonstrating live-fire cooking techniques;
- Beer Can Chicken (2002, ISBN 0-7611-2016-5), focusing on unusual and off-beat grilling recipes;
- BBQ USA (2003, ISBN 0-7611-2015-7), focusing strictly on United States barbecue;
- Raichlen's Indoor Grilling (2004, ISBN 0-7611-3335-6), focusing on grilling techniques using contact grills and grill pans for indoor use;
- Raichlen on Ribs, Ribs, Outrageous Ribs (2006, ISBN 0-7611-4211-8).
