= International Cake Exploration Societé =

The International Cake Exploration Societé (ICES) was founded in 1976 in Monroe, Michigan, USA by Betty Jo Steinman. The ICES is a nonprofit organization dedicated to preserving, advancing and encouraging exploration of the sugar arts. ICES also promotes and provides opportunities for continuing education, development of future sugar artists, and enjoyment of the art form.

Board of Directors and Executive Officers are elected by the membership at the time. Local Representatives are elected in each state, or appointed.

ICES holds an annual Convention and Sugar Art Show in a different location in the United States.

== Certification ==
ICES Certification Program aims to educate and encourage ICES members to develop their talents in the sugar arts, acquire new skills, and improve their standard of decorating. The Certification Program is available to any ICES member. Certification is a live, 8-hour, adjudicated test held in conjunction with the annual ICES Convention and Show.

== Scholarships ==
ICES awards one or more annual scholarships to applicants deemed most likely to develop and promote the art form.

== Board of Directors (2017-2018) ==
Name	Position
Pam Dewey	Chairman
Suzy Zimmermann	President
Jan Wolfe	Vice President
Elizabeth Dickson	Treasurer
Cherryl Kemp	Recording Secretary
Heidi Schoentube	Corresponding Secretary

== Committees ==
Committee	Chairman
Awards (Scholarship)	Mari Senaga
Budget & Finance	Rebecca Lujan
Bylaws	Rhoda Sheridan
Certification & Education	Jan Wolfe
Contracts	Bonnie Brown
Convention	Linda Fontana
Ethics	Pam Dewey
International Liaison	Osires Barbosa
Internet	Kyla Myers
Job Descriptions	Pam Dewey
Membership	Chineze Ibuoka
Newsletter	Cherryl Kemp
Nominations & Elections	Rebecca Lujan
Property & Records Management	Gwendolyn Scroggins
Publicity	Kyla Myers
Social Media	Kyla Myers
Representatives Liaison	James Bender

== Chapters ==
The ICES has its branches in a number of states, such as: Colorado, Connecticut, Florida, Georgia, Illinois, Indiana, Massachusetts, Michigan, Missouri, North Carolina, Ohio, South Carolina, Tennessee, Texas, Virginia.
