= Kerry Vincent =

Australian pastry chef (1945–2021)

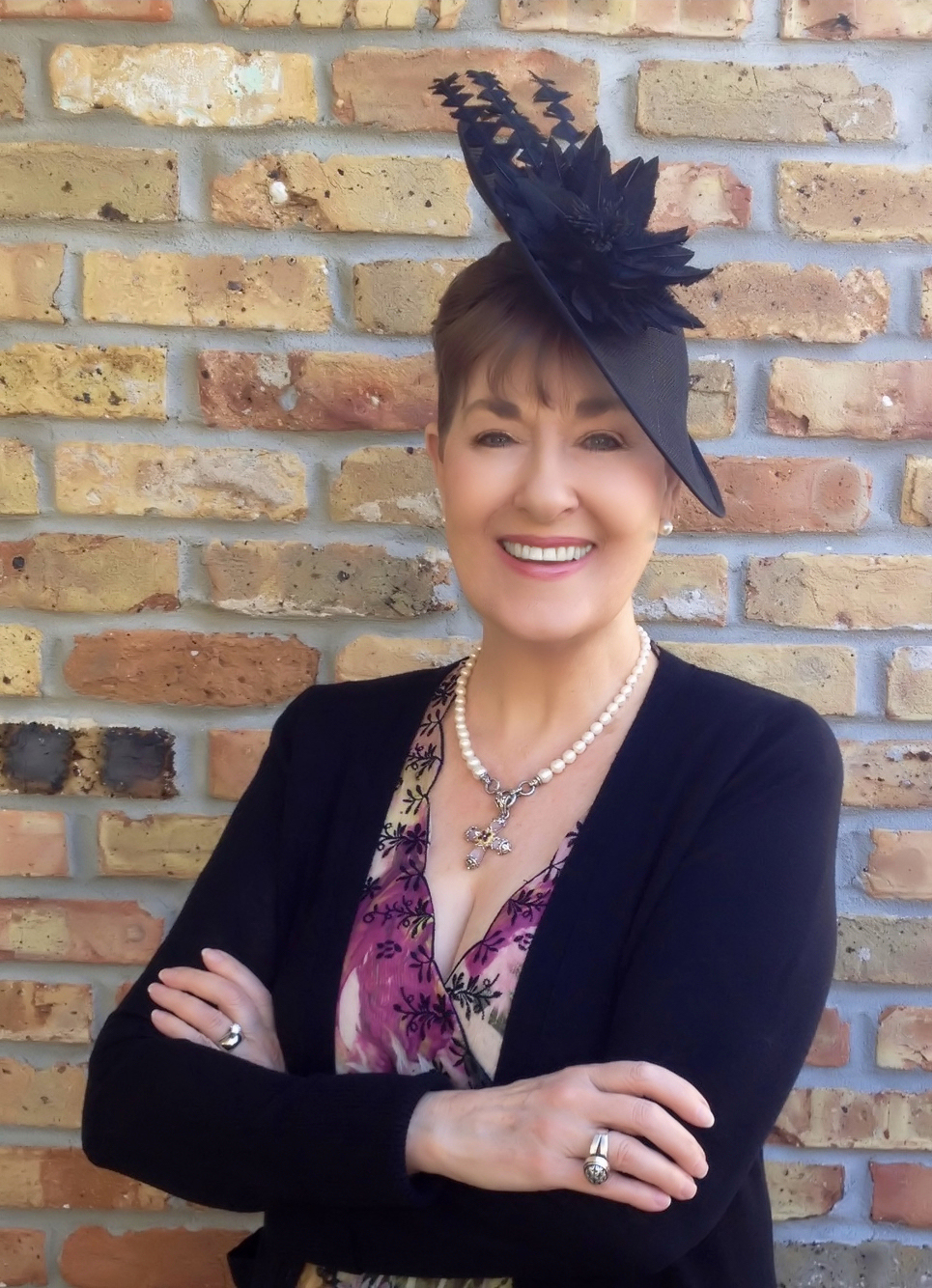
- Vincent in 2011
- Born: Kerry Flynn; 1 June 1945; Wyalkatchem, Western Australia
- Died: 2 January 2021 (aged 75); Tulsa, Oklahoma, US
- Occupations: Author, cake designer, Oklahoma State Sugar Art Show director
- Known for: Judge on Food Network Challenge, Last Cake Standing, The Best Thing I Ever Ate

Kerry Vincent (née Flynn; 1 June 1945 – 2 January 2021) was an Australian television personality and baker. She was a judge on several Food Network shows, as well the co-founder of the annual Oklahoma Sugar Art Show.

== Career ==
Vincent was a specialist cake designer. She wrote the book Romantic Wedding Cakes which was published by Merehurst Press in 2002. She was inducted into the International Cake Exploration Societé (ICES) Sugarcraft Hall of Fame in Washington, D.C. in 2004.

Vincent was instrumental in bringing fondant icing to the United States. While in Australia in 1989, she approached fondant manufacturer, Pettinice, and convinced them to set up a manufacturing facility in Texas.

Vincent regularly appeared as one of the judges on the reality series Food Network Challenge on the Food Network Cable television network. She was also the show host for four one-hour specials for the Food Network, highlighting the skill of winning contestants in the Grand National Wedding Cake Competition.

Vincent has taught at the El Atelier Del Azucar Bakery School in Santa Rosa District, Lima Province, Peru. In May 2004, she taught at the Macomb Culinary Institute in Warren, Michigan part of the Macomb Community College.

After the Wedding Style Director of Brides magazine was a guest judge at the Oklahoma Sugar Art Show, Vincent was selected for a special feature in the March–April 2008 issue of the magazine entitled "America's 50 Most Beautiful Cakes."

In 2013, Vincent was a judge in The Great Australian Bake Off, a reality television baking competition.

In 2014, Kerry Vincent hosted nine episodes of a show on the Food Network called Save My Bakery, in which she helped out struggling bakeries.

Vincent died from an undisclosed illness on 2 January 2021, at age 75.

== Bibliography ==
Romantic Wedding and Celebration Cakes (2001)
