= The ABCs of Rock =

The ABCs of Rock was a half-hour-long music program on the Canadian Music Video Channel MuchMoreMusic. The show picked a letter each episode and lists artists, albums, trivia questions and events in pop-culture, then lists them during the episode. The show leaned towards covering artists with controversial natures.

== Episodes ==
Featured Artists	Where Are They Now?	Featured Albums
Aerosmith	Apollonia Kotero	Appetite for Destruction - Guns N' Roses
Blondie	The Bangles	Back in Black - AC/DC
Cher	Culture Club	Charmbracelet - Mariah Carey
Duran Duran	Devo	Dookie - Green Day
Eminem	Erasure	Elephunk - The Black Eyed Peas
Foo Fighters	The Fugees	Fear of a Black Planet - Public Enemy
Green Day	The Go-Go's	Girl You Know It's True - Milli Vanilli
Hole	MC Hammer	Hysteria - Def Leppard
INXS	Billy Idol	I Do Not Want What I Haven't Got - Sinéad O'Connor
Rick James	The Jesus and Mary Chain	Jagged Little Pill - Alanis Morissette
Kanye West	Kiss	Kissing to Be Clever - Culture Club
Cyndi Lauper	LL Cool J	London Calling - The Clash
Madonna	Meat Loaf	Mellon Collie and the Infinite Sadness - Smashing Pumpkins
Nirvana	*NSync	New Jersey - Bon Jovi
Oasis	Ozzy Osbourne	OK Computer - Radiohead
Dolly Parton	Pogues	Purple Rain - Prince
Queen	Quiet Riot	The Queen Is Dead - The Smiths
Ramones	Rick Astley	Rock Steady - No Doubt
Sex Pistols	Salt-N-Pepa	Saturday Night Fever
Tina Turner	Talking Heads	Thriller - Michael Jackson
U2	UB40	Urban Hymns - The Verve
Van Halen	Velvet Underground	Violator - Depeche Mode
The Who	Wilson Phillips	The Wall - Pink Floyd
Xtina	XTC	Ten - Pearl Jam (X is the Roman Numeral for Ten)
Neil Young	"Weird Al" Yankovic	Youthquake - Dead or Alive
Led Zeppelin	ZZ Top	Zenyatta Mondatta - The Police

== Production crew ==
- Producers: Jessica Capobianco, Greg Miller, Bob Pagrach
- Editor: Michael Burshtyn
