= Claire Robinson =

American chef

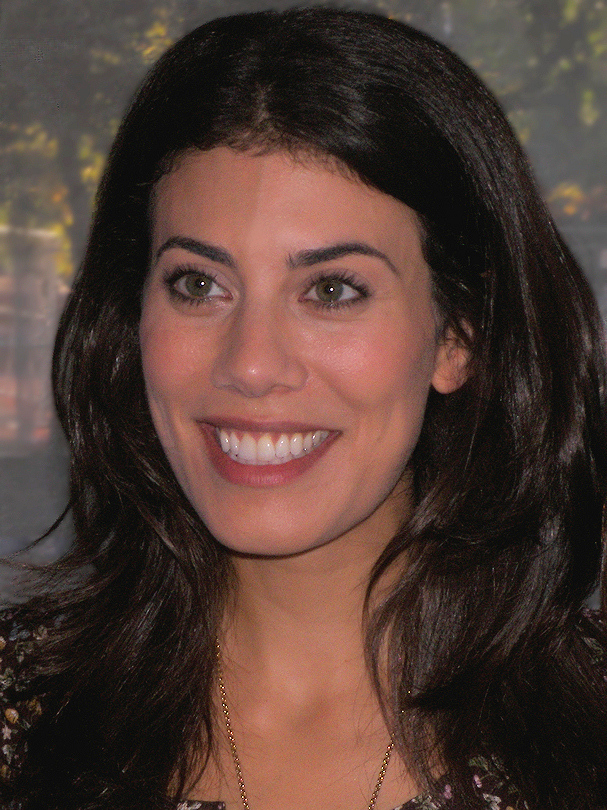
- Born: Jacksonville, Florida, US
- Education: University of Memphis, graduated in 1999 with a degree in communications and The French Culinary Institute, graduated in 2005
- Culinary career
- Cooking style: Southern and French Food
- Television show(s): 5 Ingredient Fix Chef Race: UK vs. US Food Network Challenge

Claire Robinson is a television host, author and cook. She graduated from the French Culinary Institute in 2005 and was a television host of the Food Network series 5 Ingredient Fix. On April 4, 2010, she debuted as the new host of Food Network Challenge replacing Keegan Gerhard who hosted the program from 2005 to 2010. As of 2012, she is currently the co-host with Richard Corrigan of Chef Race: UK vs. US on BBC America.

== Personal life ==
Robinson was born in Jacksonville, Florida to an ethnically diverse family. As a child her family moved frequently but eventually settled in Memphis, Tennessee. Her grandparents held PhDs in education and her grandfather was a former president of the University of Memphis. Robinson herself graduated from the University of Memphis with a degree in communications.
