= The Hungry Detective =

The Hungry Detective is a show on Food Network which premiered on October 17, 2006. The host is Chris Cognac, a police detective from Southern California. Cognac earlier appeared in Episode 4 of Food Network's Feasting on Asphalt.

Chris Cognac's mom is Louisa Tennille and his aunt is Toni Tennille, the singing half of Captain & Tennille.
