= The Club (2010 TV series) =

2010 baseball reality TV show

The Club is a baseball reality TV show broadcast on the MLB Network. In 2010, its first season, the show focuses on the Chicago White Sox. While many White Sox leaders appear on the show, general manager Kenny Williams and manager Ozzie Guillén appear most frequently.
