= The Big Waste =

American food reality television special

- Genre: Food reality television
- Starring: Anne Burrell; Bobby Flay; Alex Guarnaschelli; Michael Symon
- Country of origin: United States
- Original language: English

Production
- Running time: 41:00

Original release
- Network: Food Network
- Release: January 8, 2012

The Big Waste is an American cooking reality competition television special that aired on Food Network on January 8, 2012. Two two-chef teams (Anne Burrell/Alex Guarnaschelli and Bobby Flay/Michael Symon) competed to cook the best meal using foods that were on their way to being discarded. All of the foods that were used were inspected before the chefs utilized them.
