= Cookie Wars =

American food reality television pilot

- Genre: Food reality television
- Presented by: Jonathan Bennett
- Judges: Shinmin Li; Andi Kirkegaard
- Country of origin: United States

Production
- Running time: 41:00
- Production company: Super Delicious

Original release
- Network: Food Network
- Release: December 22, 2019

Cookie Wars is an American cooking competition television pilot that aired on Food Network on December 22, 2019. It was presented by television personality Jonathan Bennett; with cake artist Shinmin Li and cookie artist Andi Kirkegaard serving as judges.

The pilot featured three competing four-member teams of cookie bakers and sugar artists, with the final team winning $10,000.

== Contestants ==
| Team | Contestant | Result |
|---|---|---|
| The Shortbreads | Athena Hackett | WINNER |
| The Shortbreads | Ann Murad | WINNER |
| The Shortbreads | Kellen Whaley | WINNER |
| The Shortbreads | Orly Yadao | WINNER |
| The Sugar Dusters | Kadesha Ford | |
| The Sugar Dusters | Robert Nieto | |
| The Sugar Dusters | Heather Reed | |
| The Sugar Dusters | Michelle Sion | |
| The Feisty Frosters | Frederick "Froggy" Isla | |
| The Feisty Frosters | Ashley Marquez | |
| The Feisty Frosters | Alexis "Lexi" Moore | |
| The Feisty Frosters | Michelle Tincombe | |
