= List of Dinner: Impossible episodes =

This is a list of all Dinner: Impossible episodes.

== Episodes ==
=== Season 1 ===
No.	Title	Original release date	Production code
1	"Here Comes the Chef: Wedding: Impossible"	January 24, 2007	IE0101
2	"Beg, Borrow and Steal: Tailgating: Impossible"	January 24, 2007	IE0105
3	"Miles Off the Coast: Fundraiser: Impossible"	January 31, 2007	IE0102
4	"Back in Time: Ye Ol' Dinner Impossible"	February 7, 2007	IE0103
5	"Race on the Rails: Dinner Train: Impossible"	February 14, 2007	IE0104
6	"The British Cowboy: Cattle Drive: Impossible"	February 21, 2007	IE0106
7	"Stranded: Deserted Island: Impossible"	February 28, 2007	IE0107
8	"Infiltrating the CIA"	March 7, 2007	IE0108
9	"Secret Service: Inauguration Impossible"	March 14, 2007	IE0109
10	"A Hollywood Ambush: Premier Impossible"	March 21, 2007	IE0110
11	"The Frozen Chef: Ice Hotel Impossible"	April 11, 2007	IE0113
12	"Rush Dinner: Frat House Impossible"	April 18, 2007	IE0112
13	"Boot Camp"	May 16, 2007	IE0111

=== Season 2 ===
No.	Title	Original release date	Production code
14	"Major League Ballpark Challenge"	July 22, 2007	IE0202
15	"Spelling Bee Impossible"	August 1, 2007	IE0201
16	"Lunch Lady Land"	August 8, 2007	IE0203
17	"Night Shift Impossible"	August 15, 2007	IE0204
18	"The Catwalk Chef"	August 29, 2007	IE0206
19	"Dinner Under Construction"	September 2, 2007	IE0205
20	"Celebrity Golf Tournament"	September 5, 2007	IE0207
21	"Camp Cookoff: Robert vs. Guy"	October 14, 2007	IE0208
22	"Mall Madness"	October 24, 2007	IE0209
23	"Magicians Meal"	October 31, 2007	IE0211
24	"Pixar Movie Mission"	November 7, 2007	IE0212
25	"Elvis Eats"	November 14, 2007	IE0210
26	"Mission: Holiday Hope"	December 2, 2007	IE0213

=== Season 3 ===
No.	Title	Original release date	Production code
27	"Cruise Against the Clock"	January 16, 2008	IE0301
28	"Air Force Anniversary"	January 23, 2008	IE0302
29	"Medieval Mayhem"	January 30, 2008	IE0303
30	"Circus Juggling"	February 6, 2008	IE0304
31	"Robert & the Chocolate Factory"	February 13, 2008	IE0305
32	"Late for the Luau"	February 20, 2008	IE0306
33	"Santa Fe Struggle"	March 12, 2008	IE0307
34	"Groundhog Daze"	March 26, 2008	IE0309
35	"Brewhouse Bites"	April 23, 2008	IE0312
36	"Culture Clash Wedding"	April 30, 2008	IE0308
37	"Operation: Improv"	May 21, 2008	IE0311
38	"Firehouse Fiasco"	May 28, 2008	IE0310

=== Season 4 ===
No.	Title	Original release date	Production code
39	"Disney Dinner Dash"	July 2, 2008	IE0401
40	"Puerto Rican Predicament"	July 9, 2008	IE0402
41	"Far East Feast"	July 16, 2008	IE0403

=== Season 5 ===
No.	Title	Original release date	Production code
42	"Escape to Alcatraz"	August 20, 2008	IE0507
43	"Boardwalk"	August 20, 2008	IE0503
44	"Grand Ole Opry Obstacles"	August 27, 2008	IE0502
45	"No Pork, No Pressure"	September 3, 2008	IE0501
46	"Mother's Day Madness"	September 10, 2008	IE0504
47	"Block Party Blowout"	September 17, 2008	IE0505
48	"Crayon Craziness"	September 24, 2008	IE0508
49	"Hospital Hijinks"	October 22, 2008	IE0506
50	"The Pork Man's Nightmare"	October 29, 2008	IE0510
51	"Street Cart Critics"	November 5, 2008	IE0509

=== Season 6 ===
No.	Title	Original release date	Production code
52	"X Food at the X Games"	April 8, 2009	IE0602
53	"Yahoo Search Scramble"	April 15, 2009	IE0601
54	"Casino Craziness"	April 22, 2009	IE0603
55	"NBA All Star Stress"	April 29, 2009	IE0604
56	"Crossword Puzzle Crisis"	May 6, 2009	IE0605
57	"Barbie's Birthday Breakdown"	June 10, 2009	IE0606

=== Season 7 ===
No.	Title	Original release date	Production code
58	"Roller Derby Debacle"	August 12, 2009	IE0701
59	"Candy Catastrophe"	August 19, 2009	IE0702
60	"Amusement Park Adventure"	August 26, 2009	IE0703
61	"Feeding Frenzy at the Zoo"	September 2, 2009	IE0704
62	"Food Court Fiasco"	September 9, 2009	IE0705
63	"Ice Cream Meltdown"	September 16, 2009	IE0706
64	"Block Party"	October 14, 2009	IE0707
65	"Sesame Street Scramble"	October 21, 2009	IE0708
66	"Rock & Roll Hall of Fame: Rock the Chef"	October 28, 2009	IE0709
67	"Double Jeopardy"	November 4, 2009	IE0710
68	"WWE: A Mission on the Mat"	November 11, 2009	IE0711
69	"Newseum: Museum Mayhem"	November 18, 2009	IE0712
70	"Robert And Guy's Holiday Havoc"	December 9, 2009	IE0713H

=== Season 8 ===
No.	Title	Original release date	Production code
71	"Boxed In: Terminal Trouble"	March 3, 2010	IE0802
72	"Dorm Food Doom"	March 10, 2010	IE0803
73	"Ironman Obstacles"	March 17, 2010	IE0804
74	"Destroyer Disaster"	March 24, 2010	IE0801
75	"Pirate Peril"	March 31, 2010	IE0805
76	"Balloon Blowup"	April 7, 2010	IE0806
77	"Robert's Lost Mission"	May 19, 2010	IE0810
78	"Disney Dilemma"	June 2, 2010	IE0809
79	"Speed Dating Downfall"	June 9, 2010	IE0807
80	"Judgment Day"	June 16, 2010	IE0808
81	"Caffeine Crash"	June 23, 2010	IE0811
82	"Mission in the Mud"	June 30, 2010	IE0812
83	"Spring Training Tangle"	July 7, 2010	IE0813

=== Season 9 ===
No.	Title	Original release date	Production code
84	"Mission in Paradise"	March 11, 2021	902
85	"Ghost Town Gourmet"	March 18, 2021	903
86	"3 Weddings and A Robert"	March 25, 2021	904
87	"Tropic Lightning"	April 1, 2021	905
