= Feasting on Asphalt =

- Also known as: Feasting on Waves
- Genre: food
- Created by: Alton Brown
- Written by: Alton Brown
- Directed by: Alton Brown
- Presented by: Alton Brown
- Starring: Alton Brown
- Theme music composer: Alton Brown
- Country of origin: United States
- Original language: English
- No. of seasons: 3

Production
- Executive producer: Alton Brown
- Production locations: United States, Caribbean

Original release
- Network: Food Network

Feasting on Asphalt is a television series starring Alton Brown of the Food Network programs Good Eats and Iron Chef America.

Brown's third series, Feasting on Asphalt explores "road food" (eating establishments which cater to travelers) in the historical and present-day United States, with an emphasis on unique restaurants and regional cuisine. In the first two seasons, Brown and his crew seek "good eats" across the country, via Brown's BMW motorcycle. "As far as I’m concerned, there’s no better way to experience the road than from the back of a bike," says Brown. During the third season (titled Feasting on Waves), Brown trades the motorcycle for a boat to island hop throughout the Caribbean with a similar mission.

== Season 1 ==
Season 1 consisted of four episodes, initially broadcast July 29, August 5, August 12, and August 19, 2006 (Shot Spring/Summer '06). Brown traveled from the Atlantic Ocean to the Pacific Ocean, and sampled food along his travel route. The episodes included segments documenting famous journeys and travelers (from the Odyssey to the Crusades, to Lewis and Clark, and Jack Kerouac), and interviews with many of the restaurant owners and patrons he met en route.

Brown suffered a motorcycle crash during the shooting of the Nevada segment, injuring his right clavicle. This injury was caught on camera and was shown in episode 4.

Brown began his trip in Mount Pleasant, SC, then wound his way through Georgia, South Carolina, North Carolina, Tennessee, Kentucky, Indiana, Missouri, Kansas, Colorado, Utah, Arizona, Nevada and then to the California coast.

=== Episode 1 ===
Title: "The South Shall Fry Again"

Places Visited:

| Place | Coordinates | Establishment | Notes |
|---|---|---|---|
| Mount Pleasant, SC | 32°51.38′N 79°47.92′W | Jack's Cosmic Dogs | This was the only (open) food establishment Alton Brown admits to being familiar with prior to the roadtrip |
| Mount Pleasant, SC | 32°47.22′N 79°52.59′W | Pitt Street Pharmacy | Soda Jerk |
| Savannah, GA | 32°03.81′N 81°05.94′W | Streamliner Diner | |
| Gilsonville, SC | not given | Robert Lee Smalls Store | Pickled Pig's Feet; Place and establishment identified on foodnetwork.com, but not on the broadcast. |
| Washington, GA | 33°43.6242′N 82°43.119′W | Bones Biscuit-bar & Grill | Closed |
| Toccoa, GA | 34°34.62′N 83°19.90′W | The Chicken Basket | Closed |
| Toccoa, GA | 34°34.62′N 83°19.90′W | Shirley's Soul Food Cafe | |
| Spartanburg, SC | 35°02.55′N 81°48.51′W | Hobo Hollar Produce | |
| Charlotte, NC | 35°11.57′N 80°52.41′W | South 21 Drive-In | |

=== Episode 2 ===
Title: "I Smell Pork"

Places Visited:

| Place | Coordinates | Establishment | Notes | |
|---|---|---|---|---|
| Cashiers, NC | 35°17.95′N 83°08.86′W | The Carolina Smokehouse | | |
| Sunbright, TN | 36°21.76′N 84°45.86′W | Lou's Cafe | | |
| North Corbin, KY | 36°56.64′N 84°05.73′W | Sanders Cafe | Original Colonel Sanders | |
| Bowling Green, KY | 36°59.67′N 86°26.73′W | Duncan Hines' Home | | |
| Bowling Green, KY | 36°59.98′N 86°26.80′W | Smokey Pig BBQ | | |
| Evansville, IN | 37°58.61′N 87°33.84′W | Greyhound Bus Station | Vending machines | |
| Evansville, IN | 37°58.30′N 87°34.53′W | YWCA Tea Room | | Closed |
| Evansville-New Harmony Road, IN | 37°59.16′N 87°36.44′W | Hilltop Inn | Brain Sandwich, Squirrel Burgoo | |
| St. Louis, MO | 38°35.37′N 90°18.47′W | Ted Drewes Frozen Custard | | |

=== Episode 3 ===
Title: "High Plains Feaster"

Places Visited:

| Place | Coordinates | Establishment | Notes |
|---|---|---|---|
| Saint Louis, MO | 38°38.62′N 90°17.46′W | Grounds, 1904 World's Fair | |
| Weaubleau, MO | 37°53.44′N 93°32.47′W | Anonymous tourist court | |
| Florence, KS | 38°14.51′N 96°55.59′W | Spring Fling event | Brisket BBQ |
| Florence, KS | 38°14.51′N 96°55.59′W | Harvey house | |
| La Junta, CO | 37°59.26′N 103°32.59′W | Former Woolworth's lunch counter | closed |
| La Junta, CO | 37°59.26′N 103°32.59′W | Copper Kitchen Cafe | |
| Pikes Peak, CO | 38°50.45′N 105°02.84′W | Brown's campstove on Pikes Peak summit | Coffee at 14,000 feet, brewed with Pikes Peak snow |
| Mancos, CO | 37°22.27′N 108°15.88′W | Ted's Taco | frybread |
| Mexican Hat, UT | 37°09.04′N 109°51.97′W | Mexican Hat Lodge | |

=== Episode 4 ===
Title: "California or Bust"

Places Visited:

| Place | Coordinates | Establishment | Notes |
|---|---|---|---|
| Monument Valley, UT | not given | Linda and Woody's RV | hash browns, made using "Essence of Emeril" (which Brown points out "doesn't actually smell like Emeril") |
| Kayenta, AZ | not given | Linda W.'s house | mutton stew, fry bread, intestine, stomach fat, blue cornmeal mush, wild pine nuts, Navajo tea, Navajo tacos |
| Indian Springs, NV | 36°27.86′N 115°26.04′W | anonymous gravel road | Brown's motorcycle mishap, he traveled by car from this moment on |
| Las Vegas, NV | not given | Curly Q Camp | chuck wagon re-enactment; due to Brown's injuries from above incident he was unable to attend although remainder of crew did |
| Rialto, CA | 34°06.40′N 117°20.95′W | Wigwam Motel | hardtack, homemade by Brown from "an authentic Civil War recipe" |
| Ontario, CA | 34.0316°N 117.6180°W | Cathy and John's semi and Fork in the Road Restaurant | muffler beef stew (made with an accessory originally designed for snowmobiles) and meatloaf cooked using plug-in cooker |
| Hawthorne, CA | not given (mobile) | lunch wagon | breakfast burrito |
| Hawthorne, CA | 33°54.90′N 118°20.63′W | Continental Gourmet market | empanadas |
| Hawthorne, CA | 33°54.11′N 118°19.99′W | B&R Old Fashion Burgers | royal burger (2.5 lb. - pastrami, egg, etc.) |
| Hawthorne, CA | not given | Dino's drive-through | pastrami hot dog |
| Hawthorne, CA | 33°55.45′N 118°21.16′W | Fosters Freeze | soft serve ice cream with Hawthorne PD Detective (now Hawthorne PD Sergeant and host of The Hungry Detective) Chris Cognac; supposedly site of inspiration for the Beach Boys song Fun, Fun, Fun but, was actually the A&W hamburger stand on Hawthorne Blvd; ice cream; pepper balls |
| Hawthorne, CA | 33°55.85′N 118°21.36′W | Acosta's tacos | |

Note: Coordinates were incorrectly shown in ddmmss format on the program.

Alton Brown is shown wearing a sling for three quarters of this episode after his motorcycle accident in Nevada and resulting shoulder injury. On the sling is written: "If you can read this odds are I'm about to scream." The Chicago Tribune said of the incident that Brown was "surely the only Food Network celeb to have broken bones in a motorcycle crash on camera".

== Season 2 ==
The second season, Feasting on Asphalt 2 – The River Run, began airing August 4, 2007 on the Food Network. The journey began in Venice, Louisiana, with Brown and his crew tracing the Mississippi River north. According to Brown's website, Feasting on Asphalt 2 was filmed during April and May 2007, and consists of six episodes along the Great River Road. Brown deviates from the Great River Road, however, missing several of the cities that travel along the Mississippi River; rather than following the river through towns such as Grand Rapids, Minnesota, and Bemidji, Minnesota, Brown cuts straight over from Crosby, Minnesota to Itasca State Park in order to reach the source of the Mississippi River.

=== Episode 1 ===
Title: "A Strong Brown God"

According to Brown, a strong brown god is a term used by T. S. Eliot to describe the Mississippi River.

Places Visited:

| Place | Coordinates | Establishment | Notes |
|---|---|---|---|
| Just outside New Orleans, LA | | Luzianne | Tea blends formulated for iced tea. According to Brown, Luzianne kept its employees on full salary during the months the company was closed following Hurricane Katrina. |
| New Orleans, LA | 29°56.65′N 90°03.88′W | Mulate's | Gumbo, grilled alligator, frog legs, bread pudding. |
| New Orleans, LA | | Big Fisherman | Boiled crawfish, crawfish pies, sausage, stuffed artichoke. |
| Hammond, LA | 30°27.29′N 90°29.10′W | Kliebert's Gator & Turtle Farm | Has been raising alligators since the 1940s. Kliebert's ranching methods are said to have increased the alligator population. The alligators are fed frozen nutria. |
| Vacherie, LA | | B&C Seafood | Red beans and rice, alligator, gumbo, boudin balls, sausage, potato salad. |
| La Place, LA | 30°04.34′N 90°28.34′W | Bailey's Andouille | Andouille, tasso, hog head cheese. |

=== Episode 2 ===
Title: "Fry Me a River"

Places Visited:

| Place | Coordinates | Establishment | Notes |
|---|---|---|---|
| Baton Rouge, LA | | Uncle Bill's Spices | A demonstration on grinding sassafras leaves into filé powder. |
| Natchez, MS | 31°32.34′N 91°23.77′W | The Donut Shop | Drive-thru donut shop. |
| Natchez, MS | 31°33.64′N 91°23.81′W | Club 601 | Spaghetti and fried catfish. |
| Outside Natchez, MS | | Natchez State Park | Brown cooked breakfast for the crew. Grits with head cheese, picante scrambled eggs, and fried andouille. |
| Natchez Trace Parkway | | | A brief history of this historic road, while traveling to their next destination. |
| Lorman, MS | 31°49.24′N 91°03.02′W | Old Country Store | Fried chicken, corn bread, and greens. Brown said it was the best fried chicken he'd ever had. |
| Vicksburg, MS | 32°21.12′N 90°52.08′W | Biedenharn Candy Co. | Brown discussed the strategic importance of Vicksburg during the American Civil War, and Biedenharn first bottling Coca-Cola in 1894. |
| Greenville, MS | 33°51.21′N 91°03.71′W | Jim's Cafe | Beef tips on pancakes. |

=== Episode 3 ===
Title: "Soul Food Survivor"

Places Visited:

| Place | Coordinates | Establishment | Notes |
|---|---|---|---|
| Greenville, MS | | Doe's Eat Place | Tamale Trail. Preparation of tamales, and theories about their popularity on the Mississippi delta. |
| Rosedale, MS | 33°51.21′N 91°01.65′W | Joe's White Front Cafe | "Koolickles" (pickles made with cherry Kool-Aid), and corn husk tamales. Brown later said this was his favorite recipe from the book based on the TV show. |
| West Helena-Helena, AR | 34°35.86′N 90°47.80′W | Ray's Dairy Maid | Pecan and coconut meringue pies. City erroneously given as Helena, Alaska (AK) on map. |
| Memphis, TN | 35°07.55′N 89°57.55′W | Pink Palace Museum | Replica of the original Piggly Wiggly grocery store. |
| Memphis, TN | 35°05.15′N 90°03.42′W | Jim Neely's Interstate Bar-B-Que | Memphis school of barbecue. Pork skins, baby back ribs, chopped pork on spaghetti, deep fried sausage. |
| Memphis, TN | | Wiles-Smith Drugs | Cherry milk shakes at a drug store lunch counter. Brown mistook a stuffed porcupine for a nutria. |
| Memphis, TN | 35°10.05′N 90°00.61′W | Melanie's Soul Food Restaurant | Soul food – turkey leg, greens, corn bread, beans, caramel cake. |

=== Episode 4 ===
Title: "Take Me To The River"

Places Visited:

| Place | Coordinates | Establishment | Notes |
|---|---|---|---|
| Paducah, KY | | | Brown's barge trip ends here. |
| Chester, IL | 37°54.32′N 89°50.01′W | Home of Popeye | Home of Popeye's creator and Brown's taste of canned spinach. |
| Alton, IL | | Alton IL, Visitor Center | Where Alton Brown learns how midwesterners pronounce the name Alton. |
| Alton, IL | 38°53.29′N 90°09.78′W | Fast Eddie's - Bon Air | Off the river road road-house. Built in the 1920s by Anheuser Busch. |
| Alton, IL | 38°54.204′N 90°08.947′W | Pie Town | Best pecan pie north of the Mason–Dixon line according to Brown. Closed Dec 2008. |
| Saint Louis, MO | 38°35.521′N 90°18.169′W | Donut Drive-In | 6525 Chippewa Street - Best donuts Brown has ever consumed |
| Saint Louis, MO | 38°37.016′N 90°15.712′W | Worlds Fair Donuts | 1904 S Vandeventer - Peggy the fastest change maker doesn't have much time for Brown after the camera man gets in her way. Old school donuts. |
| Saint Louis, MO | 38°34.377′N 90°17.707′W | Saint Louis Hills Donut Shop | 6917 Hampton - Where Brown teaches a kid how to drink coffee and does a taste test with cold milk. |
| Quincy, IL | 39°56.221′N 91°23.794′W | Maid Rite | 507 North 12th Street - Home of the Maid-Rite. |

=== Episode 5 ===
Title: "Mid-American Pie"

Places Visited:

| Place | Coordinates | Establishment | Notes |
|---|---|---|---|
| Monroe City, MO | 39.5811°N 91.6657°W | Civil War battle reenactment | Union vs. Confederate coffee taste test. (Note: The GPS coordinates shown are not that close to Monroe City MO.) |
| Taylor, MO | 39°54.995′N 91°31.670′W | The 18 Wheeler Restaurant | The truck stop with the country's biggest breakfast. |
| Nauvoo, IL | 40°32.560′N 91°22.329′W | Baxter's Vineyard | 2010 Parley St - Where Mike the sound guy gets to taste midwestern wine. Brown also tries rhubarb pie with concord grape juice. |
| Niota, IL | 40°37.560′N 91°17.333′W | Quality Fisheries | On IL Hwy 96 - 157 Arbor. River fish that have been hot smoked. Deep fried morel mushrooms. |
| Muscatine, IA | 41°25.22′N 91°02.15′W | The Clam Shell | Valentine Diner number 2111. Also where pearl buttons come from river mollusc shells. |
| Moline, IL | 44°30.45′N 90°31.13′W | John Deere Visitors Pavilion | Deere Prairie Breaker plow |
| Savanna, IL | | U-Pick Asparagus | Pick your own asparagus outside of Savanna on the Great River Road. |
| Saint Donatus, IA | 42°21.85′N 90°32.36′W | Kalmes Store | Fried chicken livers with seafood cocktail sauce and pork tenderloin sandwiches with Luxembourg noodles. And the special machine to make the noodles. |
| Balltown, IA | 42°38.36′N 90°31.10′W | Breitbach's Restaurant | Iowa's oldest bar. Many pies, including rhubarb custard. |

=== Episode 6 ===
Title: "Lutefisk Express"

Places Visited:

| Place | Coordinate | Establishment | Notes |
|---|---|---|---|
| Alma, WI | 44°19.30′N 91°42.35′W | Great Alma Fishing Float | "The Mess" with smoked fish and sauerkraut named "Best road breakfast yet" by Brown. - Visited on 7/1/15 and they are no longer serving the mess |
| Frontenac, MN | 44°33.20′N 92°28.32′W | Whistle Stop Cafe | A good example of a great "Road Joint." |
| St. Paul, MN | 44°52.32′N 93°10.48′W | Russian Tea House | Once visited by U2. Brown enjoys piroshki, a traditional Russian hamburger-like dish. |
| Minneapolis, MN | 44°54.43′N 93°11.48′W | Olsen Fish Company | Providers of Brown's Lutefisk enjoyed at the end of the show. |
| St. Paul, MN | 44°56′50″N 93°5′53″W | Mickey's Dining Car | Authentic diner food. |
| St. Paul, MN | 44°56.78′N 93°11.48′W | Unnamed catering company with Soile Anderson | Smorgasbord is defined and enjoyed. |
| Minneapolis, MN | 44°57.78′N 93°17.13′W | Bob's Java Hut | Brown gets a tattoo in the shop upstairs. |
| Crosby, MN | 46°29.06′N 93°57.25′W | The Nordic Inn | Nordic theme hotel built in a converted Methodist Church |
| Itasca State Park | 47°14.23′N 95°12.27′W | | End of the road, source of the Mississippi River. |

== Season 3 ==
The third season uses the title Feasting on Waves as Brown travels the Caribbean by boat in search of local cuisine with less emphasis on established restaurants and more roadside stands and visits to residents' kitchens.

- Sugar on Isle One: a visit to Saint Kitts, Brown seeks traditional foods from roadside stands, street vendors, and homes of locals. Dishes explored include a bush tea created from fragrant grasses foraged from the roadside
- Fungi with Foraging and Fish: a visit to Saint Martin / St Maarten and a lolo stand, brews a local drink called mauby, and helps a local family prepare a boiled fish feast with local ingredients and traditions.
- Island Thyme: Brown sails on to discover "perfect" foods and home made wines made from unexpected ingredients. Sea life becomes the focus as the exploration moves below the surface.
- Won Love: Traditional family recipes and a friendly church social are just a couple of the places AB finds the "best sauce" which turns out to be the main ingredient of all of his travels.

== Motorcycles and gear ==
=== Season 1 ===
In the series, Alton Brown is seen riding a BMW R1200RT, a touring motorcycle, with a number of accessories. He wears a variety of gear including textile jackets or suits made by BMW, Aerostich, and Vanson, and Aerostich "Combat Touring" boots. His web site lists his motorcycle and camping gear, much of it procured from Aerostich. His motorcycle was purchased used from a BMW dealer and has made prior appearances on Good Eats. Its fate following the accident outside Las Vegas has not been divulged.

=== Season 2 ===
For Season 2 Alton Brown and his crew rode the BMW R1200GS, a dual-sport motorcycle. He is seen outfitted with BMW motorcycle apparel.

== Book ==
The River Run series became a book in 2008.
