= Junk Brothers =

- Created by: Chris Knight; Kathy Doherty
- Developed by: Knight Enterprises
- Directed by: Matt West
- Starring: Steve Kelley; Jim Kelley
- Country of origin: Canada

Production
- Executive producer: Chris Knight
- Editor: Mark Baxter
- Running time: 30 min.

Original release
- Network: HGTV Canada
- Release: 6 April 2006 – 23 May 2007

Junk Brothers is a reality television series broadcast by HGTV Canada. Brothers and show hosts Steve and Jim Kelley collect discarded items and use these to create new furniture. These works are then returned to the people who discarded them; the former owners of the 'junk' do not expect their discards to be refurbished in this manner.

The first episode aired 6 April 2006. By July 2006, the series was also televised on the American HGTV network. A second season began airing in Canada and the US in January 2007.
