= BBQ USA =

2022 American food documentary television series

- Genre: Food documentary
- Presented by: Michael Symon
- Country of origin: United States
- Original language: English
- No. of seasons: 2
- No. of episodes: 14

Production
- Executive producers: Nicholas Panagopoulos; Lang Yee; Michael Symon
- Producer: Karen Sinha
- Production location: Season 2: Cleveland
- Editors: Jess George; Jim McNamee; Greg Astor
- Production company: Simple Alien

Original release
- Network: Food Network
- Release: July 11, 2022 – August 8, 2023

BBQ USA is an American cooking documentary series that airs on Food Network. It also streams on Discovery+. The show follows Michael Symon as he explores the art of barbecuing around the United States by traveling to BBQ competitions. It premiered on July 11, 2022.

== Episodes ==
=== Season 1 ===
No. overall	No. in season	Title	Original release date	Prod. code	U.S. viewers (millions)	Rating (18–49)
1	1	"Stick to Your Ribs"	July 11, 2022	102	0.61	0.1
Venue: Tifton Rhythm & Ribs Festival held in Tifton, Georgia.
2	2	"Shake Your Money Muscle"	July 18, 2022	101	0.63	0.1
Venue: Qlathe BBQ Championship held in Olathe, Kansas.
3	3	"Risk it for the Brisket"	July 25, 2022	103	0.73	0.1
Venue: Cedar Fest BBQ Cook Off held in Cedar Park, Texas.
4	4	"Who You Calling Chicken?"	August 1, 2022	104	0.73	0.2
Venue: Smoke on the Falls BBQ Competition held in Gadsden, Alabama.
5	5	"Double Trouble"	August 8, 2022	105	0.54	0.1
Venue: New Jersey KnoQ-Out held in Blairstown, New Jersey.
6	6	"Going Whole Hog"	August 15, 2022	106	0.56	0.1
Venue: Memphis in May held in Memphis, Tennessee.

=== Season 2 ===
No. overall	No. in season	Title	Original release date	Prod. code
7	1	"The Royal Rumble of BBQ"	July 10, 2023	201
Venue: American Royal World Series of Barbecue held in Kansas City, Kansas.
8	2	"A BBQ Slam Dunk"	July 17, 2022	203
Venue: Jimmy Jam BBQ Slam held in Elkton, Florida.
9	3	"Smokin' at the Crossroads"	July 24, 2022	202
Venue: Briscoe Ranch BBQ Cook-off held in Cross Roads, Texas.
10	4	"Smokin' in the Sunshine State"	July 31, 2023	204
Venue: Butts & Clucks Cook-Off on the Bay held in Apalachicola, Florida.
11	5	"Battle on the Bayou"	August 7, 2023	205
Venue: 3rd Annual Operation Smoke Sheaux held in Breaux Bridge, Louisiana.
12	6	"Legends in Queens"	August 14, 2023	207
Venue: 3rd Annual Jeff Michner Foundation BBQ Benefit held in Queens, New York.
13	7	"A Salmon Showdown"	August 21, 2023	206
Venue: Washington State Spring Fair-BBQ Playoffs held in Puyallup, Washington.
14	8	"Memphis Mayhem"	August 28, 2023	208
Venue: Memphis in May World Championship Barbecue Cooking Contest held in Memphis, Tennessee.

== Production ==
The show was announced on June 8, 2022, as a six-episode series featuring restaurateur and chef Michael Symon travelling to barbecue competitions around the United States to explore the art of barbecuing in the country. As part of his assignment, Symon speaks with barbecue fans, cooks, barbecue experts and pitmasters while testing the taste of the food.

The series is produced by Simple Alien for Food Network where it airs weekly, and Discovery+ which streams it simultaneously. The show premiered on July 11, 2022. The season finale aired on August 15, 2022.

In January 2023, Symon announced that the second season was being filmed in Cleveland. In June 2023, Warner Bros. Discovery announced that it would premiere on July 10, 2023.
