= Amazing Wedding Cakes =

- Genre: Reality
- Country of origin: United States
- Original language: English
- No. of seasons: 4
- No. of episodes: 43

Production
- Executive producer: AnnaBelle McDonald
- Running time: 42 minutes
- Production company: Film Garden

Original release
- Network: WE tv
- Release: September 7, 2008 – May 29, 2011

Amazing Wedding Cakes is an American reality television series on WE tv that debuted on September 7, 2008. The series follows several bakers from around the country as they create elegant edible art wedding cakes.

== Cast ==
It has featured the following bakeries:

- Cake Alchemy
- Cake Atelier
- Cake Divas
- Cake Girls
- Christopher Garren's Cakes
- Merci Beaucoup Cakes
- The Cake Artist
- White Flower Cake Shoppe
- Gateaux Inc.
