= Building the Dream =

British television series

Building the Dream is a British television series produced by True North Productions and broadcast on More4 in which architectural designer Charlie Luxton helps people build dream homes that are both amazing and affordable.

The programme has been presented by Charlie Luxton since it first aired in September 2013, and over 90 episodes have been broadcast in nine series. Another series is due to be aired.

== Format ==
Presented by architectural designer Charlie Luxton, this is a series about real people striving to attain amazing yet affordable homes. As part of the show Charlie analyzes the building plans and gives ideas and suggestions that help to enhance the design. For added inspiration and ideas there is the opportunity to meet another self-builder who's already built their dream home.

Projects must meet the following:

1. They must be a residential self build and the applicants must be planning to live in the property on completion.
2. The applicants must be happy for Charlie to view their plans and suggest alterations
3. Planning permission is already in place.
4. The applicants agree to be filmed on a regular basis during the build

The aim for the self-build project is to finish in around 12 months for less cash than it would cost to buy that property on the market.

The properties featured in Building the Dream vary widely in style and design, from an ECO home to a German Kit Home to a house for a chronic back pain sufferer, with a sunken garden and hot tub.

The show is similar in style to Kevin McCloud's Grand Designs, but whereas "Grand Designs" is for larger budgets, Building the Dream, by contrast, is Austerity Designs, by and for those of you who can nearly, but not quite, get on the desired rung of the property ladder"

== Reviews ==
The Guardian TV Review led with "This is all about chillaxing over spiritually corrupting property porn – and it's so for me."

== Broadcast ==
Building the Dream has also been shown in Australia, New Zealand and Canada.

== Episodes ==
Episodes to date:

Series 1: 1 Hertfordshire 2 Surrey 3 Somerset 4 West Sussex 5 Wales 6 Perthshire 7 Cambridgeshire 8 Hastings 9 North Somerset 10 Warwickshire 11 Yarm

Series 2: 1 Shropshire 2 Buckinghamshire 3 Gloucestershire 4 Cheshire 5 Hertfordshire 6 Hampshire 7 Devon 8 Norfolk 9 Herefordshire 10 Hull 11 East Sussex

Series 3: 1 Yorkshire 2 Kent 3 Cumbria 4 Cotswolds 5 Humberside 6 Cornwall 7 Wiltshire 8 Devon 9 Gloucestershire

Series 4: 1 Newcastle 2 Peak District 3 Lancashire 4 Stirlingshire 5 South Lanarkshire Barn 6 North Somerset 7 Hastings Revisit 8 Pembrokeshire 9 Loughborough

Series 5: 1 Cotswolds 2 Scottish Borders 3 Birmingham 4 Isle of Wight 5 Cornwall 6 Buckinghamshire 7 Cornwall 8 South Wales 9 Lincolnshire

Series 6: 1 South East London 2 Hertfordshire 3 West Sussex 4 Fife 5 North Yorkshire 6 Cambridgeshire 7 Kent 8 Devon 9 North Devon

Series 7: 1 Streatham 2 East Yorkshire
