= Food Network Challenge =

- Presented by: Keegan Gerhard; Claire Robinson; Ian Ziering
- Starring: Various contestants and a rotating panel of judges which includes: Kerry Vincent; Keegan Gerhard; Katherine Alford; Mark Bittman; Patrick Coston; Mark O'Connor
- Country of origin: United States
- No. of episodes: (list of episodes)

Production
- Running time: 60 minutes

Original release
- Network: Food Network
- Release: July 8, 2005 – January 27, 2020

Food Network Challenge is a competitive cooking television series that aired on the Food Network. In each episode, professional chefs vie in a timed competition in their professional specialty. The winner receives a check for $10,000 and a gold medal. The first run of the series started in 2005 as a number of specials, before becoming a regular series that launched in 2007 and ended in 2011.

On November 18, 2019, it was announced that the show would return, with a premiere on December 23, 2019. Ian Ziering became the new host.

== Format ==
The competitions are judged by specialists in their culinary fields, dependent upon the particular 'challenge'. Contestants are given eight hours to complete a task and must adhere to the competition rules; for example, edible art cake competitions often require that a cake reaches a minimum height, exhibits a certain theme, and is able to be moved to a judging table without falling over. After eight hours, the host stops all activity by saying "Competitors, stop your work!".

Episodes are shot in front of a live audience, usually at tourist attractions such as the Mall of America or Disney World. Depending on the discipline and scope of the competition, the number of competitors can range from two to hundreds. Occasionally, regional competitions are held to determine who the competitors are to be each week. Some of the events are also held as world championships or as 'invitationals'.

The winner usually receives a check for $10,000 and a gold medal. In competitions featuring five or more competitors, silver and bronze medals are also sometimes awarded, though they have no cash prize.

In 2009, the show debuted its first elimination-style competition called Last Cake Standing. In this format, six cake designers competed for a prize of $50,000.

In April 2010, original host Keegan Gerhard was promoted to judge alongside Kerry Vincent, and was replaced as host by Claire Robinson. The way in which the results were read also changed for most of, but not all of the shows; where previously only the winner was announced, the newer format's results began with announcing the third- and fourth-place finishers, who were then asked to leave the stage before the victor was revealed.

== Competitions ==
The competitions presented on the program covered a wide range of areas, from cake decorating to ice sculpting to teppanyaki to macaroni and cheese, with cakes being the most frequently-covered area.

== Last Cake Standing ==
In April 2009, a special version of Challenge was launched called Last Cake Standing. This series began with six competitors, with an elimination at the end of each episode until only three competitors remained. The challenges in this series were often harder and longer and with more twists than those in the 'normal' series. The finale was the longest in challenge history, giving the last three remaining competitors — Courtney Clark, Mary Maher, and Bronwen Weber — 24 hours to design and create their cake for a set of sextuplets. Ultimately, Mary Maher was crowned champion, winning a $50,000 grand prize.

In April 2011, Food Network launched a second series of Last Cake Standing, in a separate 'spin-off' format with eight competitors and a $100,000 grand prize.

== Notable competitors ==
- Anna Ellison of Ace of Cakes
- Duff Goldman of Ace of Cakes — won the "Cereal Skylines" challenge in Season 3.
- Alex Guarnaschelli — frequent Chopped judge
- Marc Murphy — frequent Chopped judge
- Buddy Valastro of Cake Boss — won the "Battle of the Brides" challenge in Season 7.
- Bronwen Weber — competed in 22 challenges. As of September 25, 2011, she has the most wins of any competitor in the show with a total of 8 wins.
- Cody Rhodes
