= Family Style (TV series) =

- Country of origin: United States
- Original language: English
- No. of seasons: 1
- No. of episodes: 6

Original release
- Network: Food Network
- Release: August 22 – September 21, 2010

Family Style is an American reality television series that premiered on Food Network on August 22, 2010. The show centers around an Italian restaurateur family, The Maggiores, in Carlsbad, California. The series focuses on the brother and sister Joey and Melissa opening their first restaurant, Tommy V's, together. Melissa is the more strait-laced and is in charge of running the restaurant. Joey is the flashy one who is in charge of cooking in the kitchen. Their different styles constantly collide.

== Episodes ==
No.	Title	Original release date
1	"The Grand Opening"	August 22, 2010
2	"Big Dates"	August 26, 2010
3	"Rappin' Restaurant"	September 2, 2010
4	"VIPs (Very Important Parties)"	September 7, 2010
5	"Smokin' Joey"	September 14, 2010
6	"The Big Bet"	September 21, 2010
