= The Chef Jeff Project =

The Chef Jeff Project is a Food Network reality television program that aired in the fall of 2008. The show features Chef Jeff Henderson, a former drug dealer and prison inmate who has transformed his life to emerge as a successful chef and owner of a catering business, Posh Urban Cuisine.

== Premise ==
Chef Jeff invites six young adults with similar tumultuous backgrounds to work as his crew for Posh Urban Cuisine for the duration of one month. The format of the reality television program is such that all participants who complete the project are eligible for the Food Network Scholarship to culinary school. The aim of the competition test each individual to the limits and not eliminate the competition; Henderson makes is clear to the competitors that the only way they can lose is if they quit.
