= Rob Rainford =

Canadian chef

Robert Rainford
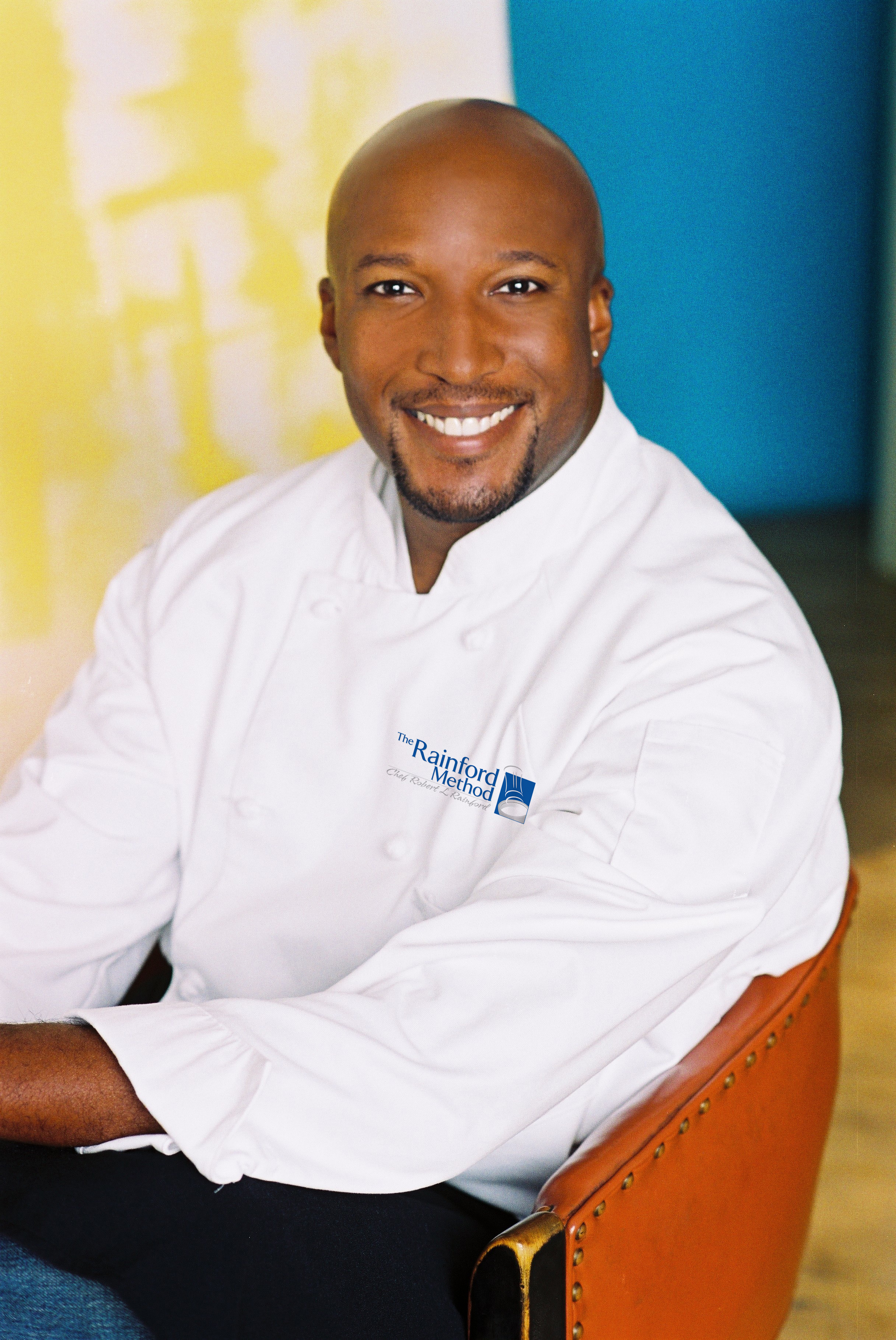
- Born: November 30, 1966 (age 59); Saint Andrew Parish, Jamaica
- Education: George Brown College
- Culinary career
- Cooking style: Grilling, Barbecue
- Previous restaurants
- Accolade; Senses Restaurant & Bar; 222 Bistro; In The Mood Restaurant and Jazz Lounge
- Television show
- License to Grill

Rob Rainford (born November 30, 1966) is a Canadian chef, author of Rob Rainford's Born to Grill and former host of Licence to Grill (LTG) on the Food Network Canada, Discovery Home (in the United States) and Asian Food Channel (across Asia). He was born in Saint Andrew Parish, Jamaica, before moving to Canada with his family at the age of three. Rainford completed his culinary school at George Brown College in 1994.

== Career ==
Rainford is best known for hosting the TV series, License to Grill, which involves backyard cooking, entertaining, and barbecuing. Rainford is tasked with hosting gatherings at his home where he prepares a meal while sharing tips and tricks for cooking on a barbecue. The techniques shared range from typical barbecue fare, such as hamburgers, steaks, and kebabs, to more complex meals, including legs of lamb, hot smoking, and grilled desserts. His signature line from the show has been "look at those beautiful char marks!"

On May 8, 2012, Rainford released his book, Rob Rainford's Born to Grill.
