= Licence to Grill =

Canadian television series

Licence to Grill is a show hosted by Rob Rainford and can be seen on Food Network Canada, Asian Food Channel and downloaded at MoboVivo. The show is produced by Knight Enterprises. The show was formerly carried in the United States on the Discovery Networks channel Discovery Home, but was dropped from the schedule when the channel was flipped to the ecology-themed Planet Green. The episode "Bike Ride BBQ" was the last one to air in the US. However, since late 2020, Roku now carries Gusto TV on Channel 440 which includes License to Grill.

Licence to Grill is a series that explores the enjoyment of backyard cooking, entertaining, and the barbecue. Each episode takes place over a day or two, but mainly on Saturdays. The host and chef Rob Rainford prepares a meal for the evening when guests will arrive.

The central theme is barbecue and with that, Rainford shows us tips and tricks for cooking on a barbecue. The recipes range from the typical barbecue fare, such as hamburgers, steaks, kebabs, to more ambitious meals such as leg of lamb, hot smoking sides of fish, and grilled desserts.

Rainford has a philosophy when it comes to the barbecue: "It's pretty simple. Just start with the freshest ingredients you can find and then you've got two choices: long slow cooking over low indirect heat, or red hot and smokin' for fast grilling. If you cook low and slow then you can use all sorts of rubs and smoking agents to infuse the food with a depth of flavour you just can't get out of an oven. As for high heat grilling, your barbecue puts out way more heat than your stovetop so you can get that wonderful charring and searing, just like in a restaurant."

== Episode list ==
Season 1:

- 1001 - "Martini Birthday Barbecue"
- 1002 - "The Barbecue For No Reason"
- 1003 - "Parents Night Out"
- 1004 - "Baseball Pulled Pork"
- 1005 - "Nothing But Chicken"
- 1006 - "Garage Sale Brunch"
- 1007 - "Blind Date With Garlic"
- 1008 - "Toga Party"
- 1009 - "The Mediterranean Feast"
- 1010 - "Karaoke Slow Ribs"
- 1011 - "The Engagement"
- 1012 - "Total Eclipse"
- 1013 - "Block Party"
- 1014 - "Mexican Fiesta"
- 1015 - "Full Moon - Summer Solstice"
- 1016 - "Surprise Guest For Dinner"
- 1017 - "Da Boys"
- 1018 - "The Soccer Team Fundraiser"
- 1019 - "The Superstar Celebration"
- 1020 - "The Hole In One"
- 1021 - "Saucy Contest"
- 1022 - "The Girls' Championship Game"
- 1023 - "Burgs and Dogs - Paint the Fence"
- 1024 - "Bocce Ball Tournament"
- 1025 - "Taste of the Sea"
- 1026 - "Pool Party"

Season 2:

- 2027 - "Hawaiian Luau"
- 2028 - "Mardi Gras"
- 2029 - "International Beer Day Celebration"
- 2030 - "Airband Concert Pre-Party"
- 2031 - "Japanese Farewell Dinner"
- 2032 - "Godfather Italian Feast"
- 2033 - "Caribbean Bon Voyage"
- 2034 - "Wine and Cheese"
- 2035 - "Aerobic Marathon"
- 2036 - "40th Birthday Bash"
- 2037 - "Blackout"
- 2038 - "Poker Night with the Boys"
- 2039 - "Sunday Afternoon BBQ"

Season 3:

- 3040 - "Vegas Night"
- 3041 - "Pajama Party"
- 3042 - "Fancy Pants Dinner"
- 3043 - "Taste of India Celebration"
- 3044 - "Volleyball Dinner"
- 3045 - "Volunteer Dinner"
- 3046 - "Poetry Club BBQ"
- 3047 - "Rodeo BBQ"
- 3048 - "Successful Jump"
- 3049 - "The Non-Engagement"
- 3050 - "80's Night"
- 3051 - "Hot Tub Night"
- 3052 - "Boys Gone Fishing"

Season 4:

- 4053 - "Costume Party BBQ"
- 4054 - "Pool Party"
- 4055 - "Horseshoe Tournament"
- 4056 - "Motorcycle Parade Tournament"
- 4057 - "Olympic BBQ"
- 4058 - "Surf and Turf BBQ"
- 4059 - "Silent Auction Dinner"
- 4060 - "Live Band Party"
- 4061 - "Tapas Dinner"
- 4062 - "Carnival Day BBQ"
- 4063 - "Bike Ride BBQ"
- 4064 - "Boozey BBQ"
- 4065 - "Games Night"
- 4066 - "Dog Walkers' Breakfast"
- 4067 - "Big Promotion BBQ"
- 4068 - "Just Because BBQ"
- 4069 - "Fire Fighter Party"
- 4070 - "Ultimate Tournament"
- 4071 - "Mexican Reunion"
- 4072 - "World Cup Pub Fare"
- 4073 - "Chinese Dinner BBQ"
- 4074 - "Vegetarian Dinner"
- 4075 - "Tennis Tournament"
- 4076 - "Skateboard Dudes"
- 4077 - "Road Hockey Tournament"
- 4078 - "Scuba Dive BBQ"

Season 5:

- 5101 - "Summertime Christmas"
- 5102 - "Picture Perfect BBQ"
- 5103 - "A Saucy Contest"
- 5104 - "No Big Deal"
- 5010 - "Slo Pitch BBQ"
- 5079 - "Friday Night BBQ"
- 5080 - "BBQ Brunch"
- 5081 - "Cannonball Party"
- 5082 - "United Way BBQ"
- 5083 - "Michael's B-day Bash"
- 5084 - "The Beach BBQ"
- 5085 - "Dragon Boat Races Party"
- 5086 - "NASCAR BBQ"
- 5087 - "Fight Night Party"
- 5088 - "CD Release Party"
- 5089 - "Doc's Celebration"
- 5090 - "Greek Feast BBQ"
- 5091 - "Texas Hold 'em BBQ"
- 5092 - "3on3 Tourney"
- 5093 - "Just Another Pool Party"
- 5094 - "Fishboy's Birthday Surprise"
- 5095 - "Off to the Academy Celebration"
- 5096 - "Brick Breaking Bash"
- 5097 - "Summertime Jazz BBQ"
- 5098 - "Golf Clinic"
- 5099 - "Scavenger Hunt Party"
