= Jeff Henderson (chef) =

American chef

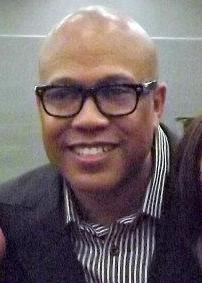
- Henderson in 2012
- Born: Los Angeles, California
- Spouse: Stacy Henderson
- Culinary career
- Cooking style: Traditional Southern Cuisine
- Television shows: The Chef Jeff Project (2008); Family Style with Chef Jeff (2013–present)
- Awards won: Las Vegas Chef of the Year (2001); Culinary Award of Excellence Quality Institute International (2002); Rising Star Award Las Vegas Business Press (2007); Role Model Youth Award Bens Kids (2012); Culinary Hall of Fame (2012)
- Website: www.chefjefflive.com

Jeff Henderson (born 1964) is an American chef, author and public speaker.

== Career and personal life ==
Henderson was born in Los Angeles in 1964 and grew up in the Watts neighborhood before he moved, with his mother and sister, to San Diego in the early 1980s. Henderson began to deal drugs, primarily cocaine. In 1988, at the age of 24, he was arrested by the San Diego Drug Task Force, charged with drug trafficking charges and ultimately convicted and sentenced to 20 years in prison. While serving his sentence, which was later reduced to 10 years, he learned how to cook.

He told Milk Street:

As a head inmate cook, I had access to a lot of extra food which the other inmates didn’t get access to, like hard-boiled eggs and red onions. I would go back to the cell block unit and I would create these Top Ramen noodle dishes, nachos and cheesecakes out of the microwave. We didn’t have a spice rack in prison, so I used to take Nacho Cheese Dorito chips, put them in a sock and crush them to use the dust as a seasoning.

After his release, he struggled to get a culinary job because of his prison record. Eventually, however, he succeeded in obtaining jobs as a dishwasher and line cook. In 2001, Henderson became the first African-American Chef de Cuisine at Caesars Palace. He eventually became an executive chef at several top restaurants including Café Bellagio, where he worked until 2006.

Henderson currently lives in Las Vegas with his wife Stacy and five children.

== Television shows ==
=== The Chef Jeff Project ===
The Chef Jeff Project was a Food Network reality television program that aired in the fall of 2008. Chef Jeff invited six young adults with rough backgrounds to work as his crew for Posh Urban Cuisine for one month in Los Angeles. All participants who completed the project were eligible for the Food Network Scholarship to culinary school.

=== Family Style with Chef Jeff ===
Family Style with Chef Jeff was a television show that premiered in fall 2013 for national syndication in the US.

=== Flip My Food with Chef Jeff ===
In this show, which debuted in September 2015, Jeff "flipped" the favorite dishes of chefs such as John Besh, artists like Neal McCoy, and everyday people to make a healthier version. The last episode aired in November 2015.

== Cookbooks ==
- Cooked: My Journey From the Streets to the Stove. New York: Harper Collins. 2007. ISBN 978-0-06-115390-7.
- Henderson, Jeff (2008). Chef Jeff Cook's. Scribner. ISBN 978-1416577102.
- America I AM Pass It Down Cookbook. New York: SmileyBooks. 2011. ISBN 978-1-4019-3136-0.
