= Ken Christianson =

American drummer

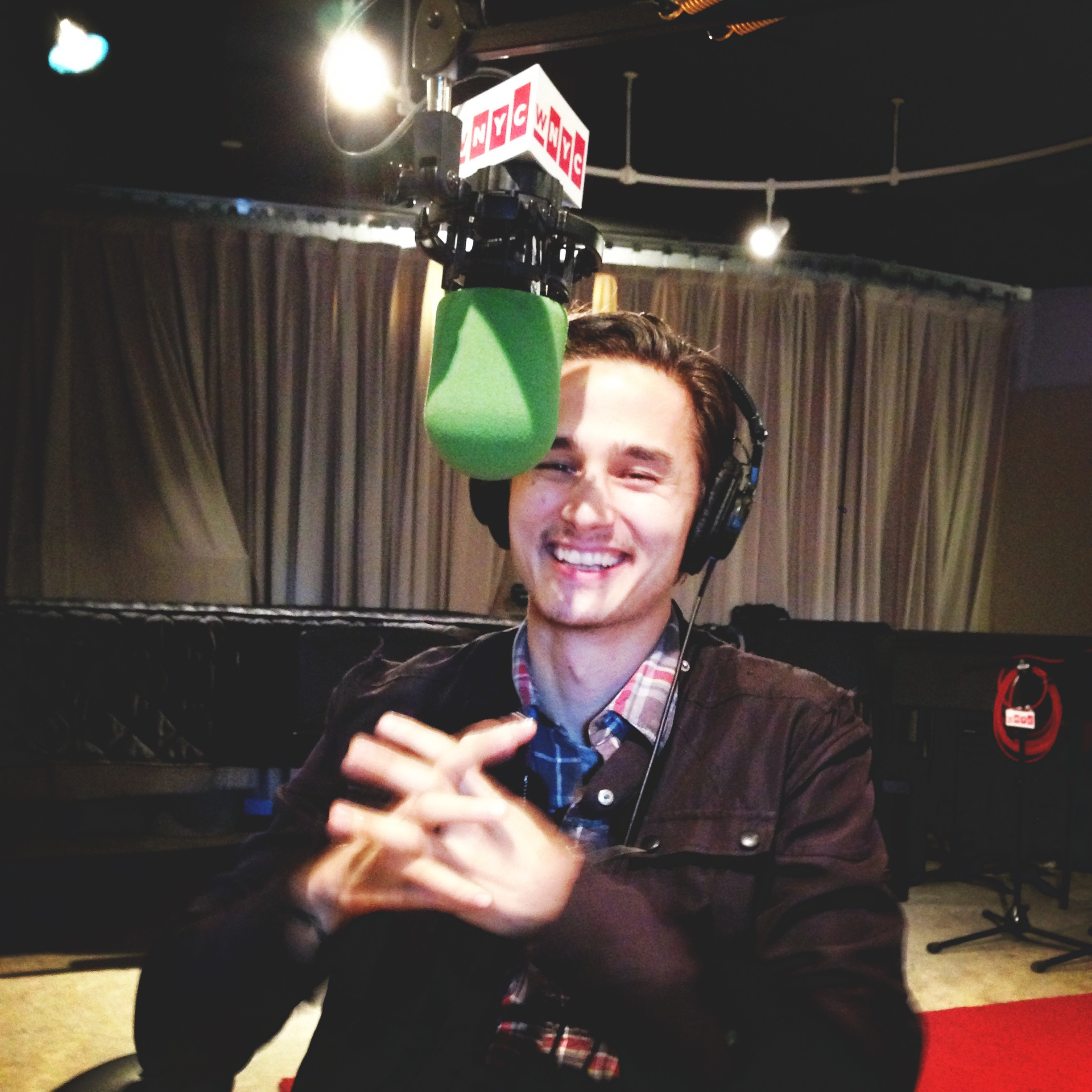
- Ken Christianson, May 2013 at a WNYC's Soundcheck

Background information
- Genres: Classical, electro-acoustic, contemporary dance, funk, rock, alternative rock, indie rock, jazz, country, folk
- Occupations: Composer, arranger, musician, sound designer, visual artist, performance artist, graphic designer, singer, singer-songwriter
- Instruments: Piano, violin, electric bass, viola, keyboards, drums
- Years active: 2000–present
- Website: composerken.com, peremusic.com, composerkensamples.com, thekenaissanceperiod.com

Ken Christianson is an American musician and artist living in Los Angeles, California, U.S., and co-founder of Père Music. He is the composer of the score to the short film Better Left Alone (2005), resident composer for the Samantha Giron Dance Project, bass player for the Los Angeles funk-jam band The Three Trees, violinist for The Jimmy Lifton Group, and former keyboard player for the indie rock band, Rogue Wave.

Ken earned his BFA in Sculpture from the Minneapolis College of Art and Design, and his MFA in Music Composition from CalArts. Christianson also completed portions of his undergraduate studies at Carleton College and Parsons Paris.

He is the younger sibling of Masanori Mark Christianson, bass-player and multi-instrumentalist of the California indie rock bands Rogue Wave, Release The Sunbird, and The Heavenly States.

== Solo work ==
Christianson performed the Jeff Buckley and Elizabeth Fraser cover "All Flowers in Time Bend Towards the Sun" at the 2008 Annual Jeff Buckley Tribute in Los Angeles, CA under the pseudonym Scott Mead.

Christianson released a self-produced 26-track double album set on January 15, 2010, entitled Sunshine/Shadow.

On February 11, 2010, Christianson performed at the "To Haiti With Love" all-star musical jam at Boulevard 3 in Hollywood, CA, sharing the bill with other artists such as Common, Daniel Bedingfield, and Judith Hill.

=== Kickstarter ===
Christianson launched a Kickstarter project to fund the recording and publishing of a large number of his own composed chamber works on February 12, 2013, that successfully funded on March 24, 2013. He was pledged $12,711, surpassing the $11,250 goal.

== Collaborative work ==
In 2010 Christianson joined indie rock band Rogue Wave for their North American tour promoting their fourth full-length album, Permalight, playing synthesizers and violin, and singing backup vocals.

Christianson finished a tour at the end of August 2008 with the Samantha Giron Dance Project, with performances at the new Santa Fe Complex in Santa Fe, NM, the 2008 Boulder Fringe Festival in Colorado, as well as the 2008 Celebrate Dance Festival in San Diego, California. His compositions for the tour included pre-recorded music as well as live electronic and acoustic performance.

Christianson again composed and arranged music in collaboration with the Samantha Giron Dance Project for eight performances at the Unknown Theater in Los Angeles in April 2009 with a piece entitled Mongrels, a multi-form modern dance performance capturing the spirit of the underground dance community synthesizing classical violin-driven music with club and modern dance.

Ken composed and performed the score for a dance series entitled "Dis-Illusions", choreographed by Donna Sternberg. The first of this series was performed at the Royal T Cafe in Culver City, CA on November 7, 2010. "Dis-Illusions II" was performed May 7, 2011, at the LA Live Arts space in Eagle Rock, CA. The third installment, "Dis-Illusions III", was performed at the Annenberg Community Beach House in Santa Monica, CA June 14, 2011.

Ken continued his ongoing collaboration with choreographer Samantha Giron again for the performance of "Sex, Love, Money," a modern ballet shown at San Francisco's CounterPULSE theater on July 22 and 23, 2011. Critic Stephanie Echeveste of SF Weekly remarked, "The score by Ken Christianson was a delight, ranging from muted underwater explosions to trembling violins, glitchy electronic melodies, and pulsating beats. Sprinkled throughout were anecdotal soundbites about marriage, which frame the piece."

Ken composed music for "The Flowering of Desire", the first in a series of dance performances choreographed by Donna Sternberg & Dancers on November 13, 2011. The piece was performed at the Baldwin Hills Scenic Overlook in Culver City, CA and made possible by grants from the Culver City Performing Arts Grant Program with support from Sony Pictures Entertainment.

In March 2012, Ken contributed original compositions to NAACP Image Award winner Kenyetta Lethridge's play Innocent Flesh.

== Père Music ==
In April 2013, Christianson and partner Cassandra Nguyen launched Père, a commissioned-based, personalized music service for newborns. Père was featured on WNYC's program Soundcheck in May 2013.

== Representation ==
In March 2011, Ken signed with Angry Mob Publishing based in Santa Monica, CA.

== The Menstruators ==
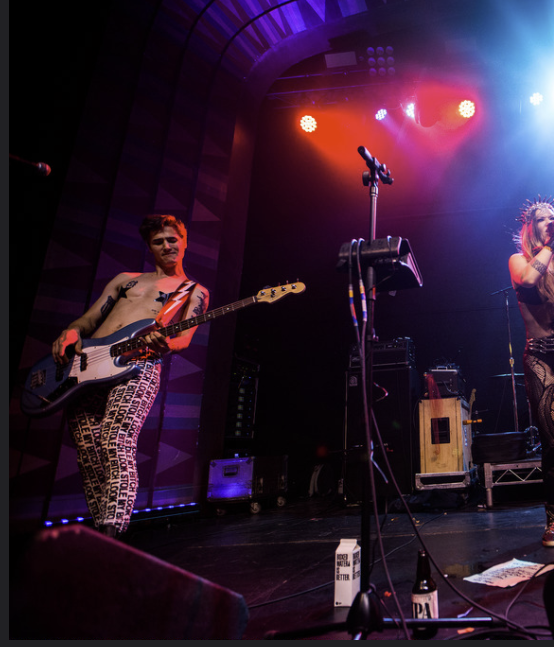
Christianson and Nadia G. performing at The Regent Theater in Los Angeles for Riot Grill, August 2015.

Christianson and Nadia G's Bitchin' Kitchen star Nadia Giosia founded the punk-rock group The Menstruators in 2015, with members Ale Robles (drums) and Robin Feldman (guitar). He left the group in 2017, after the group's completion of its self-produced first album, Dead Glitter. The band's breakup was the subject of a Wall Street Journal article published August 23, 2017.

== Extra Lives Music ==
Christianson formed the retro videogame cover group Extra Lives with former bandmate Michael Kohl in 2016, playing bass and violin. Extra Lives began recording and releasing live performances of retro video games on YouTube weekly until 2022, when the group began performing live interactive narrative shows.

== Midnite Radio ==
In 2025, Christianson became the vocalist and song arranger of Midnite Radio, a rock band founded by collaborators Beak Wing (drums), Lee Coram (guitar), bassist Miles Martin and guitarist Jon Shearer. The band released its debut EP, Auntie, in February 2026.
