= NewNowNext Awards =

American entertainment awards show

The NewNowNext-Awards was an American annual entertainment awards show, presented by the lesbian, gay, bisexual and transgender-themed channel Logo TV. Launched in 2008, awards are presented both for LGBT-specific and general interest achievements in entertainment and pop culture.

== 2008 ==
Logo 2008

The nominees were announced by Cazwell and Amanda Lepore. Hosts were Candis Cayne and Colman Domingo. Music acts were The Cliks, Dangerous Muse, Cyndi Lauper, and Lady Gaga (making her TV debut).

Production Co: Pro - Active Entertainment Group

=== Winners ===
- Best.Lesbian.Vlog.Ever: Brunch With Bridget
- Best Gay Kiss: Jack (John Barrowman) and Ianto (Gareth David-Lloyd) on Torchwood
- Brink of Fame Song: "Semi Precious Weapons" by Semi Precious Weapons
- Most Addictive Reality Star Award: Christian Siriano
- The Kylie Award (Next International Crossover): Leona Lewis
- Brink of Fame Actress: Candis Cayne
- Most Guiltiest Pleasure Award: A Shot at Love with Tila Tequila
- Best Show You're Not Watching: The Sarah Silverman Program
- 'Cause You're Hot: Tina Fey
- Brink of Fame Comic: Julie Goldman
- Totally Most Rad Sickest Blog Ever: Dlisted.com
- OMFG Internet Award: Planet Unicorn
- Always Next, Forever Now Award: Janet Jackson
- Because You Deserve An Award: Gossip Girl
- Brink of Fame Music Artist: The Cliks
- Best Future Feature: Another Gay Sequel: Gays Gone Wild!
- BreakOut Destination: Bahia, Brazil
- Brink of Fame: Author: T. Cooper
- Brink of Fame Filmmaker: Jamie Babbit
- Hottest Downe & Out character on TV: Rose Rollins (Tasha, The L Word)
- Best Upcoming Industry Gay Gaming Professional: Jeb Havens
- Best Collegiate Coach: Kirk Walters

== 2009 ==
Logo 2009

The 2009 awards show was hosted by RuPaul on May 21 at the Hiro Ballroom at the Maritime Hotel in NYC. The show aired on LOGO on June 13. The "Always Next, Forever Now Award" was presented to Britney Spears. Performers included Morningwood, Storm Lee, The Fire and Reason, and The Paradiso Girls.

=== Winners ===
- Brink of Fame Actor: Nelsan Ellis
- OMFG Internet Award: Prop 8 - The Musical
- Best Show You’re Not Watching: True Blood
- Most Guiltiest Pleasure: The Wendy Williams Show
- Most Addictive Reality Star: Ongina, RuPaul's Drag Race
- 'Cause You’re Hot: Jessica Clark
- Best Future Feature: Brüno
- Brink of Fame Music Artist: The Fire and Reason
- Brink of Fame Comic: Kate McKinnon
- Always Next, Forever Now Award: Britney Spears

== 2010 ==
The 2010 NewNowNext Awards were held in Los Angeles and premiered on June 17, 2010 on Logo. Niecy Nash and Cheyenne Jackson co-hosted the awards show.

=== Winners ===
- Brink of Fame Actor: Lea Michele
- OMFG Internet Award: Lesbians Who Look Like Justin Bieber
- Best Show You’re Not Watching: Archer
- Best New Indulgence: The splits on RuPaul's Drag Race
- Most Addictive Reality Star: Johnny Weir, Be Good Johnny Weir
- 'Cause You’re Hot: Jesus Luz
- Best Future Feature: Burlesque
- Brink of Fame Music Artist: Agnes
- Brink of Fame Comic: Michelle Collins
- Always Next, Forever Now Award: Paula Abdul

== 2011 ==
The 2011 NewNowNext Awards were presented on April 7, 2011 and were hosted by James Van Der Beek. The awards telecast premiered on Logo on April 11.

=== Nominees and winners ===
Winners designated in bold

Brink of Fame Actor:

- Andrew Garfield
- **Darren Criss**
- Donald Glover
- Emma Stone
- Nicholas Hoult
- Rooney Mara

#zOMG Internet Award

- **@CarrieFFisher on Twitter** (tie)
- DamnYouAutoCorrect.com
- **JamesVanDerMemes.com** (tie)
- Mike Tompkins
- Sassy Gay Friend

TV You Betta Watch

- 1 Girl 5 Gays
- **Pretty Little Liars**
- Skins
- The Game
- The Walking Dead
- Vampire Diaries

Best New Indulgence

- Angry Birds
- Netflix Watch Instantly
- OWN
- **New Kids On The Block/Backstreet Boys – Summer Tour 2011**
- TJ Kelly, The A-List: New York

Most Addictive Reality Star

- **Tabatha Coffey**, Tabatha's Salon Takeover
- Tyler & Catelynn, Teen Mom
- Carmen Carrera, RuPaul's Drag Race
- Josh Kilmer-Purcell & Brent Ridge, The Fabulous Beekman Boys

'Cause You're Hot

- Amber Heard
- Archie Panjabi
- Ben Cohen
- Jesse Williams
- **Joe Manganiello**
- Sofia Vergara

Next Must-See Movie

- **Bridesmaids**
- Harry Potter and the Deathly Hallows – Part 2
- The Smurfs
- Water for Elephants
- X-Men: First Class

Brink of Fame Music Artist

- **Oh Land**
- Sleigh Bells
- Two Door Cinema Club
- Willow Smith
- Wynter Gordon

Always Next, Forever Now Award: Lady Gaga

== 2012 ==
=== Nominees ===
Next Mega Star

- Lizzy Caplan (New Girl, FOX)
- Josh Hutcherson (The Hunger Games)
- Michael B. Jordan (Parenthood, NBC)
- Elizabeth Olsen (Kill Your Darlings)
- Emily VanCamp (Revenge, ABC)

Brink-of-Fame: Music Artist

- Azealia Banks (Interscope Records)
- Childish Gambino (Glassnote Records)
- FUN. (Atlantic Records)
- Jessie J. (Universal Republic Records)
- Neon Hitch (Warner Bros. Records)
- Rebecca Ferguson (Columbia Records)

Most Addictive Reality Star

- Abby Lee Miller (Dance Moms, Lifetime)
- Andy Cohen (Watch What Happens Live, Bravo)
- Big Ang (Mob Wives, VH1)
- Evelyn (Basketball Wives, VH1)
- Nadia G. (Bitchin' Kitchen, Cooking Channel)
- Willam Belli (RuPaul's Drag Race, Logo)

Cause You're Hot

- Channing Tatum (Magic Mike)
- Henry Cavill (The Tudors, Showtime)
- Jessica Lange (American Horror Story, FX)
- Naya Rivera (Glee, Fox)
- Novak Djokovic (tennis player)
- Paula Patton (MI4, Paramount)

Beyond Style Award

- Andrej Pejic (model)
- China Chow (Work of Art: The Next Great Artist, Bravo)
- Jeremy Scott (designer)
- Kelly Osbourne
- Sean Avery (writer)

Best New Indulgence

- Absolutely Fabulous Revival (BBC/Logo)
- Pinterest.com
- Seamless.com
- Revenge (ABC)

Next Must-See Movie

- Magic Mike (WB)
- Moonrise Kingdom (Univ)
- Prometheus (Fox)
- Snow White & the Huntsman (Univ)
- Ted (Univ)
- The Avengers (Par)

TV You Betta Watch

- Game of Thrones (HBO)
- GCB (ABC)
- Homeland (Showtime)
- Portlandia (IFC)
- Savage U (MTV)
- Shameless (Showtime)

Superfan Site Award

- http://adam-lambert.org
- http://ladygaganow.net
- http://lipsyncforyourlife.tumblr.com
- http://realitytvgifs.tumblr.com
- http://trueblood-news.com
- http://vampire-diaries.net

== 2013 ==
=== Nominees ===
Next Mega-Star

- Allison Williams (Girls, HBO)
- Andrew Rannells (The New Normal, NBC)
- Dave Franco (Warm Bodies, Summit Ent.)
- Julianne Hough (Safe Haven, Relativity)
- Kerry Washington (Scandal, ABC)
- Rebel Wilson (Pitch Perfect, Universal)

Next Must-See Movie

- Fruitvale, Weinstein Company
- Man of Steel, Warner Bros.
- Pacific Rim, Warner Bros.
- Star Trek Into Darkness, Paramount
- The Great Gatsby, Warner Bros.
- The Heat, Fox

TV You Betta Watch

- Catfish: The TV Show, MTV
- House of Cards, Netflix
- Scandal, ABC
- The Americans, FX
- Veep, HBO
- Workaholics, Comedy Central

Most Addictive Reality Star

- Abby Lee Miller, Dance Moms, Lifetime
- Kris Jenner, Keeping Up with the Kardashians, E!
- Naomi Campbell, The Face, Oxygen
- Reza Farahan, Shahs of Sunset, Bravo
- Tamar Braxton, Tamar & Vince, WE tv

Best New Indulgence

- Arrow, CW
- Betty F$!king White on Twitter
- George Takei on Facebook
- Real Husbands of Hollywood, BET
- Vine App on Twitter

Beyond Style

- Adele in Christopher Bailey for Burberry (MTV Music Awards)
- Elle Fanning in Rodarte (Rodarte Campaign)
- Jennifer Lawrence in Dior (Oscars)
- Kelly Rowland in Georges Chakra (Grammy’s)
- Kendall Jenner in Sherry Hill (Sherry Hill Fashion Show)
- Michelle Obama in Jason Wu (State of the Union)

Cause You’re Hot

- Adan Canto, The Following, Fox
- Barry Sloane, Revenge, ABC
- Henry Cavill, Man of Steel, Warner Bros.
- Mahershala Ali, House of Cards, Netflix
- Richard Madden, Game of Thrones, HBO
- Stephen Amell, Arrow, CW

Superfan Site

- f$!kyeahdragrace.tumblr.com
- grumpycats.com
- hungergamestrilogy.net
- rihannadaily.com
- westeros.org

That's My Jam

- Bruno Mars, "When I Was Your Man", Atlantic Records
- Kesha, "C'Mon", Kemosabe Records/RCA Records
- Macklemore & Ryan Lewis, "Can't Hold Us", Macklemore
- P!nk feat. Nate Ruess, "Just Give Me a Reason", RCA Records
- Solange Knowles, "Losing You", Terrible Records
- Tegan and Sara, "Closer", Vapor/Sire Records

Coolest Cameo

- 2 Chainz, 2 Broke Girls, CBS
- Adam Levine, American Horror Story, FX
- Joan Collins, Happily Divorced, TV Land
- Joe Biden, Parks and Recreation, NBC
- Johnny Depp, 21 Jump Street, Sony Picts.
- Ryan Reynolds, Ted, Universal Picts.

Host with the Most

- Chris Hardwick, Talking Dead, AMC, “The Nerdist,” BBCA
- Chelsea Handler, Chelsea Lately, E!
- Heidi Hamilton, That Sex Show, Logo
- Michelle Buteau, Best Week Ever, VH1
- Padma Lakshmi, Top Chef, Bravo
- Stephen Colbert, The Colbert Report, Comedy Central

Foreign Import of the Year

- Benedict Cumberbatch
- Maggie Smith
- Nicholas Hoult
- One Direction

Hottest, Sexiest Ink

- Adam Levine
- Adele
- Colin Kaepernick
- David Beckham
- Rihanna
- Zoe Saldaña

Best New Do

- Anne Hathaway
- Charlize Theron
- Justin Bieber
- Miley Cyrus
- Nicki Minaj
- Robin Wright

Most Innovative Charity of the Year

- Astraea Lesbian Foundation for Justice
- Born This Way Foundation
- Housing Works
- It Gets Better Project
- OutServe-SLDN
- The Point Foundation
