= Out of the Shadow =

Out of the Shadow may refer to:

- Out of the Shadow (Responsive), a self-released 2003 album by Rogue Wave
- Out of the Shadow (album), a 2004 remastered version of the Rogue Wave album issued by Sub Pop Records
- Out of the Shadow (1919 film), a 1919 American silent mystery film by Emil Chautard
- Out of the Shadow (1961 film), a 1961 British thriller film by Michael Winner
- Out of the Shadow (2004 film), an American documentary film by Susan Smiley about her mother's battle with schizophrenia
- An alternative translation of the title of a novel Coming out of the Shadow by Janusz A. Zajdel
- Out of the Shadow (2006 urban dance theatre), an Austrian urban dance theatre piece by Alexander Wengler and the dance company Nobulus

== See also ==
- Out of the Shadows (disambiguation)
