= Delusions of Grand Fur =

Studio album by Rogue Wave
- Released: April 29, 2016
- Label: Easy Sound Recording Company

Rogue Wave chronology
Nightingale Floors (2013)	Delusions of Grand Fur (2016)	Cover Me (2017)

Professional ratings
Aggregate scores
Source	Rating
Metacritic	68/100
Review scores
Source	Rating
AllMusic	link
Pitchfork	5.7/10 link
PopMatters	8/10 link
Under The Radar	7.5/10 link

Delusions of Grand Fur is the sixth studio album by Rogue Wave, an American indie rock band based in Oakland, California. It was released on April 29, 2016 through Easy Sound Recording Company.

== Background ==
Rogue Wave frontman Zach Rogue on the process behind Delusions of Grand Fur: "It wasn’t the plan to take three years. My son was born in the middle of our last album cycle, and I wanted to be around to spend time with him, especially his first year because it’s so formative. I didn’t want to travel, and we also wanted to make kind of an unconventional record. There was no demo-ing; we just did everything on the fly. It was a very spontaneous recording process, and we knew that wasn’t really something we could do in a fancy, expensive studio. It just took longer than we thought, and we weren’t in a hurry." Unlike their prior effort Nightingale Floors, which was produced by John Congleton, Rogue and Spurgeon wanted to move away from "chas[ing] sounds" and instead "just discover sounds and then your song is done and it's just a moment in time"

The album features Mike Deni of the band Geographer and Sam Hopkins of Caveman. The song "In the Morning" was mixed by former Death Cab for Cutie member Chris Walla.

== Recording ==
Zach Rogue described the process of creating the lead single "What Is Left to Solve" as follows: "I wrote it on acoustic guitar and thought it was gonna sound something akin to “Africa” by Toto. But it sounded really boring and lifeless. So Pat started playing a drum machine and I picked up a synth. The living spirit ghost of Gary Numan must have stopped by because everything got dark and minimal and the song finally started to make sense."

Pat Spurgeon, Rogue Wave drummer and recording engineer, detailed his experience recording the songs in the band's Oakland studio: "Zach and I both were going with the songs as they came. We didn't have a specific reference, like a band or an album or anything, but sometimes that would happen as we were going. And that was one of those moments as an engineer where I really was happy. We’d end with a little drum fill, just a snare and kick thing and it ended up reminding me so much of a sound on Paul McCartney's first solo record. That sort of sound would permeate some other songs because once it would start sounding like something, we would just go that direction."

The band shared a studio space, and had access to a variety of gear throughout the recording process. In an interview with Reverb, Spurgeon says, "So all of a sudden we've got ourselves more gear and more toys. So the record is weird; each song was kind of put together as one piece, like we didn't put down stuff and then go back and revisit too much. It's, like, almost impossible to figure out what was sued on every song but we certainly would take advantage of anything that came in that was new, which was actually really awesome."

== Album title ==
The title of the album is a play on the phrase "delusions of grandeur." When asked about the meaning of the title, the band replied in a Facebook Q&A that the name is subject to interpretation but to the band, the title refers to "...people in bands thinking they will be living the easy life once they get signed to a label. thinking they can become new people when the band gets going. but the truth is, you are always yourself, no matter what. the truth always gets you in the end.". In an interview with Entertainment Weekly, Rogue added that the title refers to how "we kind of live within this delusional state in order to get up in the morning and be functional human beings.

== Promotion ==
The lead single "What Is Left to Solve" was released on February 8, 2016, and premiered through the music blog Stereogum. The second single, "California Bride," premiered through Noisey on March 10, 2016. The third song released from the album, "Ocean," premiered on April 6, 2016 through KCRW.

== Track listing ==
No.	Title	Length
1.	"Take It Slow"	3:51
2.	"In the Morning"	4:52
3.	"California Bride"	4:14
4.	"Look at Me"	3:33
5.	"Falling"	2:59
6.	"Curious Me"	3:49
7.	"What Is Left to Solve"	4:45
8.	"Frozen Lake"	3:38
9.	"Endless Supply"	3:18
10.	"Ocean"	3:19
11.	"The Last Picture Show"	2:46
12.	"Memento Mori"	5:14

== Personnel ==
Musicians

- Masanori Mark Christianson - bass
- Mike Deni - vocals
- Jon Monahan - guitar
- Sam Hopkins - synthesizer
- Zach Rogue - primary artist, producer, composer
- Pat Spurgeon - engineer
- Cielle Taaffe - violin

Production

- Keith Armstrong - mixing
- Matt Craven - photography
- Alan Douches - mastering
- Stephanie Edwards - layout
- Mikael “Count” Eldridge - mixing
- Matthew Puckett - composer
- Alex Snideman - synthesizer engineer
- Chris Walla - mixing
