= Steven John Taylor =

American musician

- Born: Sacramento, California. U.S.
- Genres: Singer songwriter, indie rock, R&B, hip hop
- Occupation: Musician
- Instruments: Keyboard, guitar, guitorgan
- Years active: 2001-present
- Website: stevetaylormusic.com

Steven John Taylor is an American singer, songwriter, and multi-instrumentalist. In addition to his solo career, he has played keyboards and guitar for bands such as Rhye, Nicki Bluhm, and Rogue Wave. He was born in Sacramento, California and grew up in the College Glen area, attending Saint Ignatius Catholic School and the Sacramento Waldorf School. Dropping out in 10th grade following a bout of misdiagnosed obsessive–compulsive disorder, he later enrolled at Sacramento High School.

Taylor then moved to Seattle and attended the University of Washington. On the side, he began playing with various local musicians, including Jason McGerr, future drummer of Death Cab for Cutie. In 2001, he recorded his debut self-titled EP with Martin Feveyear. Still searching for his niche, he moved to New York City, attending School of Jazz at The New School, where his fellow students included Georgia Anne Muldrow, who would go on to help him release his own music. While in New York, he joined the afrobeat band Akoya, playing tenor guitar. While getting settled in New York, the one story building he was living at in Williamsburg, Brooklyn collapsed while he was sleeping. While Taylor was unhurt, it destroyed many of his belongings, including rare musical equipment. Taylor soon left New York, settling in Nevada City, California for a time, and eventually San Francisco. After listening to gospel music outside of a Baptist church in the Western Addition, he was invited inside to play along.

In 2008, toured as a keyboardist with hip hop bands Zion I and The Mighty Underdogs, and in 2009 began playing keyboards and guitorgan for Rogue Wave, contributing to their 2010 album, Permalight. As a member of Rogue Wave, Taylor lived in Oakland, California.

In February 2008, he released his first full-length album, Has The Size of The Road Got The Better of You?. The album featured Marco Benevento and Joe Russo on organ and drums, respectively. The album is currently out of print after selling out of the initial pressing of 1,000 copies.

Taylor has also collaborated with Andy Cabic of Vetiver, Avi Buffalo, and The Botticellis. In late 2012, after moving to Los Angeles, he joined the electro-soul group Rhye, touring with them through 2013. Following this, he released his second solo album The Land of Milk and Honey.
