= Nightingale Floors =

Studio album by Rogue Wave
- Released: June 4, 2013
- Genres: Indie rock, Alternative rock
- Label: Vagrant Records
- Producer: John Congleton

Rogue Wave chronology
Permalight (2010)	Nightingale Floors (2013)	Delusions of Grand Fur (2016)

Nightingale Floors is the fifth studio album by Rogue Wave, an American indie rock band. It was released on June 4, 2013 through Vagrant Records.

Professional ratings
Review scores
Source	Rating
The A.V. Club	75/100
NoRipcord	70/100
Pitchfork	6.3/10

== Background ==
Work began on the album about a year after the final shows promoting the previous Rogue Wave album, Permalight. Frontman Zach Rogue, feeling exhausted after the tour and recording and release of the album, took time off from Rogue Wave to work on other projects.

Says Rogue: "I didn't want to do Rogue Wave unless I felt really excited again, like it was when we were starting out. So Pat and I hadn't hung out in like a year, and we just started playing in our studio in Oakland, and as soon as we started, it felt right. Right away, it felt inevitable that we were going to work on these songs and have a new record; we need to kind of start over and start with a new label and do all new things and it feels good. I feel like we're a whole new band now. We are! We have all new players."

== Recording ==
In an interview with Charged.fm, Rogue speaks about the recording and production behind the record, saying, "On this one, we tried to just let go and not try to make it perfect and just have fun and try to play live more and not try not to overdose unless we thought it really needed that. Just make it sound like how we actually play." On the overall rawness of the album and recording process, Rogue says, "We like records where you’re using mixed media. We do demos of stuff, and then we tracks the songs formally and take pieces of the demos and put them into the final product. One of the songs on the record, 'Without Pain,' is actually the demo, and so we wanted to bring the rawness back to what we do. We wanted to sound like how we actually play, and not the highly edited version. That’s not us, that’s not who we are. We’re not slick. We’re pretty real, and I like putting it out there."

== Track listing ==
No.	Title	Length
1.	"No Magnatone"	3:03
2.	"College"	3:58
3.	"Figured It Out"	3:15
4.	"Siren's Song"	5:00
5.	"The Closer I Get"	3:18
6.	"S(a)tan"	4:18
7.	"Used to It"	2:49
8.	"Without Pain"	2:13
9.	"When Sunday Morning Comes"	2:53
10.	"Everyone Wants to Be You"	8:12

== Personnel ==
Musicians

- Zach Rogue - Composer, Primary Artist
- Pat Spurgeon - Demo Engineer, Engineer, Mixing, Pre-Production, Primary Artist
- Julie Baeziger - Vocal Harmony
- Masanori Mark Christianson - Bass
- Ross Peacock - Analogue Synthesizer
- Peter Pisano - Guitar

Production

- John Congleton - Engineer, Mixing, Producer
- Bond Berglund - Mixing
- Alan Douches - Mastering
- Matthew Wright - Second Engineer
