= Epic Meal Time =

Canadian YouTube channel and web series

- Epic Meal Time logo
- Genre: Cooking show (food porn); Comedy; Parody
- Created by: Harley Morenstein; Sterling Toth
- Starring: Harley Morenstein; David Heuff (2010–2015); Josh Elkin (2010–2015); Ameer Atari; Mike Assor; Danny Harroch; Adam Sand; Mike Santos; Lemme Kno; Alex Perrault (2010–2013); Tyler Lemco (2010–2013); Shawn Dascal (2010)
- Country of origin: Canada
- Original language: English
- No. of episodes: 358 (471 videos total) (list of episodes)

Production
- Producer: Evan Rimer
- Cinematography: Sterling Toth
- Camera setup: Canon 7D digital single-lens reflex camera

Original release
- Network: YouTube (October 2010–January 2024); Revision3 (April 2011–July 5, 2012)
- Release: October 17, 2010 – January 21, 2024

Epic Meal Time is a Canadian YouTube cooking show known for creating extremely high-calorie meals, generally out of meat products, with particular emphasis on bacon, and including alcohol, especially Jack Daniel's. It debuted in October 2010, and since then has started to release an episode every Tuesday.

It is hosted by Harley Morenstein and a group of his friends. They are now represented by The Gersh Agency and Brillstein-Grey Entertainment, and have signed with multi-channel network Collective Digital Studio. Epic Meal Time won the 2011 Shorty Award in the Food Category.

The series began in Montreal, Quebec, the group's place of origin. Episodes have been filmed in California, where guest stars such as Tony Hawk, Kevin Smith, and Arnold Schwarzenegger have made appearances.

In December 2012, Epic Meal Time spawned a spin-off series titled Epic Chef, inspired by the Food Network series Chopped. In this series, two chefs battle the 45-minute clock to create a meal using three secret ingredients mixed with a briefcase full of bacon and the featured alcoholic drink of the day.

== History ==
The idea for Epic Meal Time was created when a friend filmed Morenstein eating a Wendy's hamburger that contained six beef patties and eighteen bacon strips to the theme song from The Terminator. They posted the footage on YouTube, where it gathered thousands of hits.

It was from that video that the idea for the first episode of Epic Meal Time, titled "The Worst Pizza Ever!", came about. In the episode, which was filmed on July 9, 2010, Morenstein and his friend Alex Perrault drove around to fast food restaurants in Montréal to purchase ingredients for said pizza. The two men purchased a box of KFC popcorn chicken, a Taco Bell Crunchwrap Supreme, a McDonald's Big Mac and Chicken McNuggets, a Wendy's Baconator and french fries, and an A&W Teen Burger (bacon cheeseburger) and onion rings.

Using a plain cheese pizza they purchased as a base, Morenstein and Perrault stacked the fast food items on top. They covered the entire dish in cheese, and placed it in an oven to melt the cheese and secure the fast food items to the pizza. The entire meal totaled 5,210 calories and 286 grams of fat. It was posted on YouTube on October 17, 2010.

On October 17, 2011, a year after their first video, they remade their first meal, but this time in a cake. On October 16, 2012, two years after their first video, they remade their first meal, but this time as a deep-dish pizza.

Morenstein has described the show as "Jackass in the Kitchen". Epic Meal Time's skull and cookware logo pays homage to Jackass's skull and crutches logo.

The group filmed a pilot for G4TV. They were formerly signed with Revision3, an Internet-based television network, before leaving the network in July 2012.

During its heyday in the early 2010s, the Epic Meal Time channel would routinely rack up millions of views per video, with its top 20 videos, all from 2010 to 2012, averaging more than 10.6 million views each as of February 2026. The last video released was in January 2024, with the most recent 20 videos only averaging about 78,000 views.

The show's decline has been attributed to cast changes, internal disputes, repetition, changing tastes, and stronger competition.

== Format ==
Wendy's Baconators being added in the "TurBaconEpic Thanksgiving" episode, with the individual and total fat and calorie counters visible

Each episode, typically 3–6 minutes in length, features Morenstein as the host. His profanity is bleeped out by bird calls. The episodes are filmed with a Canon 7D digital single-lens reflex camera. The episode begins with Morenstein, other recurring Epic Meal Time members, and occasionally other guests, cooking the meal itself. Most of the meals are meat-based, with alcoholic beverages (particularly Jack Daniel's whiskey) and bacon strips often included.

In most episodes, as components are added to the meal, on-screen counters display the calorie and fat content of each new addition and of the overall meal. In "Maximum Protein Experience", the group also included a protein counter. In episodes that involve candy and no meat, bacon strips are substituted with AirHeads Xtremes Sweetly Sour Belts, which have been affectionately called "gay bacon strips" due to their rainbow color.

The episode ends with a group of people eating the meal, often very messily with their hands and sometimes incorporating unusual serving utensils like wooden paddles, a chainsaw, and hockey sticks. Morenstein ends each episode with his "Next time" line, telling viewers what the group will eat next time, which is usually random and completely irrelevant to the show. For example, in one episode, he says, "Next time, we eat Cabbage Patch Kids."

== Cast and crew ==
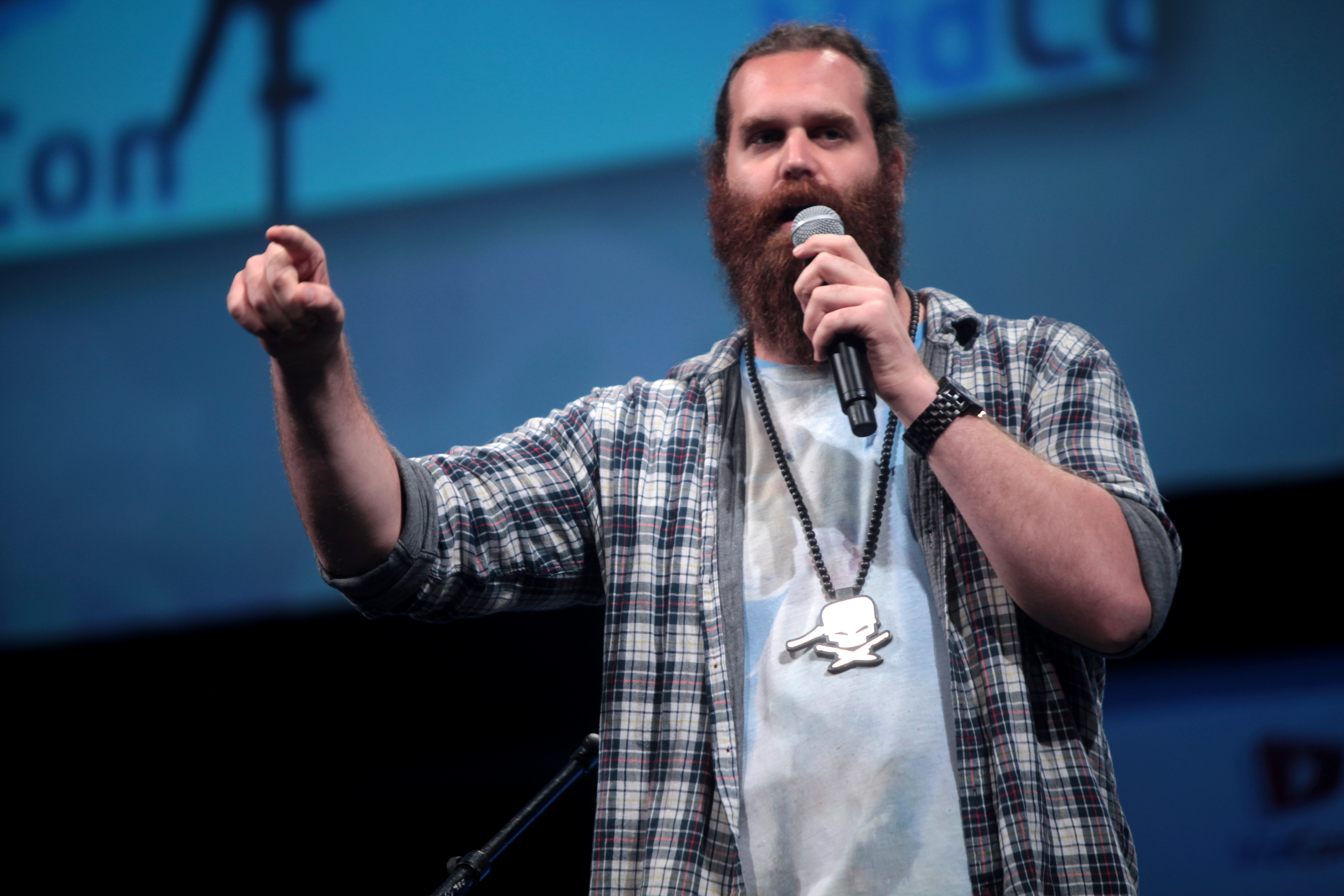
Harley Morenstein, the creator of Epic Meal Time.

The main Epic Meal Time cast members are Harley Morenstein (born July 20, 1985), a Canadian, and his friend Sterling Toth.

Morenstein is a former substitute high school teacher from Montreal. He co-created the show with Sterling Toth, who acts as the cameraman. Also frequently involved is Alex Perrault, a personal trainer whose character, "Muscles Glasses", is known for his reflective aviator sunglasses.

Concordia University students David Heuff (Cousin Dave), Tyler Lemco, Josh Elkin (Epic Mook), and Ameer Atari (Prince Atari) also appear frequently. Evan Rimer is their producing partner.

== Income method ==
Epic Meal Time uses merchandising to raise money for the show, selling a line of branded T-shirts. In interviews, Morenstein and Toth have also discussed the creation of a cookbook and an iPhone app. The episodes also contain advertisements, generated by YouTube using Google AdSense. The group has participated in referral programs for other companies such as Netflix and Gamefly. Most of the referral codes are given through the Epic Meal Time website, though the group has occasionally directly mentioned them in videos.

An EpicMealTime video game was released as an app on the Android and iOS for purchase and download in July 2012. The game is somewhat similar to that of Fruit Ninja and it revolves around one of the Epic Meal Time crew. The playable characters, beginning with Harley Morenstein, eat unhealthy food such as pizza, meat and bacon while avoiding and pushing away more healthy consumables, mostly vegetables.

Gameplay shows the EMT member being fed and opening his mouth to receive the food that flings in from both directions, while the player navigates the food to go to the member's mouth and pushes away healthy items. The game starts with three strikes and if the player consumes three healthy items, the game ends. There are no "levels" but simply playing for score as "games" are counted every time the player retries. Challenges can be unlocked as well as more food items, backgrounds, crew members and hats.

== Reception ==
The show became extremely popular, receiving millions of views per episode, prompting Morenstein to quit his job as a teacher and Toth to quit his as a graphic designer. Morenstein explained the popularity by saying, "In this day and age, I feel like there's a big emphasis on organic foods or a lot of negative media in regards to obesity and stuff like that. We are there eating this, and [viewers] are eating vicariously through us."

In March 2011, Morenstein and Toth won a Shorty Award in the food category. The Shorty Awards recognizes social media and Twitter fan-favorites. Epic Meal Time won ahead of Twitter phenomenon Ruth Bourdain and shows like Food Network's Bitchin' Kitchen.

=== Parodies ===
A parody show entitled Regular Ordinary Swedish Meal Time shows a group of Swedish people preparing traditional Swedish cuisine in an over-the-top manner. Another parody, "Epic Meal Time – Kids Edition", shows a young boy creating a macaroni and cheese meat lasagna in a similar style as Epic Meal Time. Kings of Kaukau is a parody show created by the Hawaiian comedy troupe One Hundred Thirty Plus Zero Creative Team, which combines Epic Meal Time's style of cooking with Hawaiian culture. YouTuber boogie2988 made a parody episode of the show entitled "Francis Meal Time: Mountain Dew Stew" which features every type of Mountain Dew and candy and sugary sweets such as marshmallows and candy corn.

== Appearances ==
Epic Meal Time appeared in their first late night interview on The Tonight Show with Jay Leno on March 17, 2011, where they created an "inside-out" shepherd's pie variation, shaped like a car, made with mashed potatoes, Kraft Dinner, pastrami, prosciutto, Velveeta, bacon, and barbecue sauce. Afterwards, actor Rainn Wilson, Leno's other guest that night, made an appearance to assist in eating it.

Epic Meal Time has appeared on other YouTube channels, including a cross-over episode with The Key of Awesome in "Epic Mealtime Showdown of AWESOME", and in a skit with Freddie Wong entitled "Epic VFX Time". They appeared at the 2011 Comic Con, where they performed a live show.

In August 2011, Epic Meal Time made an appearance on the DC Shoes promo video "Ken Block's Gymkhana Four: The Hollywood Megamercial". On August 3, 2013, the Epic Meal Time crew appeared on "Shark After Dark" during the Discovery Channel's Shark Week.

On November 11, 2015, Josh Elkin competed in the "Superstar Sabotage" charity tournament on the Food Network series Cutthroat Kitchen. He was eliminated in the first round, but won $2,500 for Autism Speaks. In March 2016, he became one of the judges on Cooks vs. Cons, another Food Network series.

On October 11, 2016, Ameer Atari competed on the Food Network series Chopped, in an episode whose contestants all hosted online cooking shows. He was eliminated in the first round ("Appetizer").

== Lawsuit and controversy ==
In 2011, Harley and Darren Morenstein attempted to lock out co-creator Sterling Toth, claiming that Toth was not fulfilling his role as cameraman and chief technician, to the detriment of the company. Toth responded to these allegations by taking up the issue in the Québec Superior Court, where he obtained a judgement ordering the Morensteins and Nexttime Productions Ltd. to provide him with a monthly account of sales, salaries and deductions, and obtain signed authorizations for any cash withdrawals from Nexttime intended for them or members of their family. Subsequent legal proceedings were settled out of court, though neither party has alluded to the exact details of the settlement. Toth was no longer part of the company following the lawsuit.

In 2013, Perrault and Lemco left the show. Perrault cited conflicts with Morenstein and his brother, saying, "Essentially, I felt like I wasn't being treated fairly considering the value I brought to the show. Other than Harley, no other member of the crew had any ownership of the company." When asked about his departure, Lemco replied, "Business got in the way of it being fun."

In a video blog, Morenstein explained that he co-created the Muscles Glasses character and Perrault was an actor hired to fill that role. Following Perrault's departure, Morenstein expanded the Muscles Glasses character into a spin-off series titled The Legend of Muscles Glasses, which chronicles the adventures of different men from different eras wearing the Aviator sunglasses.
