= EpicMealTime (video game) =

2012 video game

- EpicMealTime
- Developer: Molecube
- Publisher: Epic Meal Time
- Platforms: Android iPhone iPad
- Release: July 25, 2012

EpicMealTime is a video game app made for the Android and iPhone/iPad by Canadian studio Molecube, and was released on July 25, 2012. The game is based on the YouTube cooking show, Epic Meal Time and developed by Molecube.

== Gameplay ==
A gameplay picture of EpicMealTime

EpicMealTime is entirely a score-based game in which the only goal is to last as long as you can, while gathering more points each try. The player does not take control of the EMT members but instead like Fruit Ninja, the player simply controls objects while not appearing physically inside the game. The only main objective in the game is to feed the EMT member large amounts of unhealthy food as for example: bacon, pizza, cheeseburgers while also including foods that Epic Meal Time has created themselves such as the Meat Cthulhu and "Quarterback Burger". While doing this though, players must keep the members from consuming vegetables which take off one of three lives. If all three lives are used up, the game ends and the score counts up the player's progress.

Scores are qualified by the amount of calories and fat the player acquires from eating many of the disgusting foods after the round is over. The score calculates and awards the player "Internet money" in which they can buy upgrades for the game. The Upgrades include new Caps that have special abilities, unlocking crew members, buying new types of food, acquiring various backgrounds and extra lives. Since the game's release, the crew upgrade option has been halted and only Harley Morenstein is available.
