= Descended Like Vultures =

Studio album by Rogue Wave
- Released: October 25, 2005
- Recorded: February/March 2005 Supernatural Sound, Oregon City, OR; Tarbox Road Studios, Fredonia, NY Sound Wave Studios, Oakland, CA
- Genre: Indie rock
- Length: 40:10
- Label: Sub Pop; SP 677
- Producer: Bill Racine; Zach Rogue

Rogue Wave chronology
10:1 (EP) (2005)	Descended Like Vultures (2005)	Asleep At Heaven's Gate (2007)

Professional ratings
Review scores
Source	Rating
AllMusic	3.5/5 stars
Pitchfork Media	(7.8/10)

Descended Like Vultures is an album by Oakland-based band Rogue Wave. It was released on October 25, 2005, on Sub Pop Records.

== Track listing and information ==
All songs written by Zach Rogue.

1. "Bird on a Wire" – 3:40
  - Zach Rogue - Vocals, Electric Guitar, Bass, Hammond B3 Organ
  - Pat Spurgeon - Drums, Percussion, Upright Bass, Xylophone, Nomad 237 Organ, Electric Guitar
2. "Publish My Love" – 3:44
  - Zach Rogue - Vocals, Electric & Acoustic Guitar
  - Pat Spurgeon - Drums
  - Gram LeBron - Electric Guitar
  - Evan Farrell - Bass, Piano
  - Bill Racine - Drum Programming, Trumpet
3. "Salesman at the Day of the Parade" – 2:37
  - Zach Rogue - Vocals, Acoustic Guitar, Pump Organ
  - Pat Spurgeon - Tambourine, Vocals
4. "Catform" – 3:12
  - Zach Rogue - Vocals, Electric & Acoustic Guitar, Piano
  - Pat Spurgeon - Bass, Hammond B3 Organ bass pedals
  - Gram LeBron - Drums, Vocals, Rhodes
  - Evan Farrell - Electric Guitar, Wurlitzer
  - Gene Park - Viola
5. "Love's Lost Guarantee" – 4:45
  - Zach Rogue - Vocals, Electric Guitar, Casio, Nord Lead
  - Pat Spurgeon - Electric Guitar, Vocals
  - Gram LeBron - Drums, Vocals
  - Evan Farrell - Bass
6. "10:1" – 3:21
  - Zach Rogue - Vocals, Wurlitzer, Hammond B3 Organ
  - Pat Spurgeon - Drums, Percussion, Bass, Chimes, Autoharp, Hammond B3 Organ, Piano, Transistor Radio
  - Bill Racine - Guitar Mutilation, Hammond B3 Organ
7. "California" – 4:07
  - Zach Rogue - Vocals, Acoustic Guitar
  - Pat Spurgeon - Upright Bass, Percussion, Vocals, Bass Drum, Bowed Saw Blade
  - Aerielle Levy - Cello
8. "Are You on My Side" – 4:19
  - Zach Rogue - Vocals, Electric & Acoustic Guitar, Nord Lead, Casio, Percussion
  - Pat Spurgeon - Drums, Vocals, Percussion
  - Gram LeBron - Electric Guitar, Vocals, Wurlitzer, Vibraphone, Percussion
  - Evan Farrell - Bass, Vocals, Percussion, Snoring
9. "Medicine Ball" – 1:54
  - Zach Rogue - Vocals, Acoustic Guitar
  - Pat Spurgeon - Drums, Percussion, Glockenspiel
  - Evan Farrell - Bass, Lap Steel Guitar
10. "You" – 5:46
  - Zach Rogue - Vocals, Electric Guitar, Casio, Piano Strings, Guitar Army
  - Pat Spurgeon - Drums, Vocals, Cymbals, Piano, Casio, Guitar Army
  - Gram LeBron - Electric Guitar, Vocals, Wurlitzer, Guitar Army
  - Evan Farrell - Bass, Piano, Guitar Army
11. "Temporary" – 2:45
  - Zach Rogue - Vocals, Acoustic Guitar
  - Pat Spurgeon - Pump Organ, Vocals, Accordion
