= Bite This with Nadia G =

American food reality television series

- Also known as: Bite This
- Genre: Food reality television; Travel documentary
- Presented by: Nadia G
- Starring: Peter Koussioulas; Ben Shaouli; Bart Rochon
- Country of origin: United States
- No. of seasons: 1
- No. of episodes: 14

Production
- Producer: Tricon Films
- Running time: 22:00

Original release
- Network: Cooking Channel
- Release: September 24, 2013 – October 16, 2014

Bite This with Nadia G is an American food travelogue television series that aired on Cooking Channel. It was presented by chef and musician Nadia G. The series featured Nadia G traveling to different eateries and learning how to cook their signature items. The correspondents on the series had all appeared on Nadia G's previous series, Nadia G's Bitchin' Kitchen.

The pilot episode of Bite This aired on September 24, 2013. The series officially premiered on July 14, 2014 and ended on October 16, 2014, after one season.

== Cast ==
- Nadia G – Herself
- Peter Koussioulas – Panos
- Ben Shaouli – Yeheskel Mizrahi, the Spice Agent
- Bart Rochon – Hans

== Episodes ==
No.	Title	Original air date	Production code
1	"Austin"	September 24, 2013	CCBTT-100H
2	"Los Angeles"	July 14, 2014	CCBTT-101H
3	"Vermont"	July 21, 2014	CCBTT-102H
4	"Hamptons"	July 28, 2014	CCBTT-103H
5	"Harlem/Bronx"	August 4, 2014	CCBTT-104H
6	"Atlantic City"	August 11, 2014	CCBTT-105H
7	"Detroit"	August 18, 2014	CCBTT-106H
8	"Chicago"	August 28, 2014	CCBTT-107H
9	"Louisville"	September 4, 2014	CCBTT-108H
10	"Nashville"	September 11, 2014	CCBTT-109H
11	"Phoenix"	September 18, 2014	CCBTT-110H
12	"Palm Springs"	October 2, 2014	CCBTT-111H
13	"Silicon Valley"	October 9, 2014	CCBTT-112H
14	"Reno"	October 16, 2014	CCBTT-113H
