= Out of the Shadow (album) =

Studio album by Rogue Wave
- Released: July 13, 2004
- Recorded: Turkey Crossroads, Woodstock, New York
- Genre: Indie rock
- Length: 36:43
- Label: Sub Pop SP650
- Producers: Zach Rogue; Bill Racine

Rogue Wave chronology
Out of the Shadow (2004)	10:1 (2005)

Professional ratings
Review scores
Source	Rating
Allmusic	link
FasterLouder	link
Pitchfork Media	7.8/10 link
Rolling Stone	link

Out of the Shadow is the debut studio album released in 2004 by the indie rock band Rogue Wave. A live version of "Every Moment" was featured on the Napoleon Dynamite original soundtrack.

== Track listing ==
All songs written by Zach Schwartz (a.k.a. Zach Rogue).

1. "Every Moment" – 2:15
2. "Nourishment Nation" – 2:41
3. "Be Kind & Remind" – 2:36
4. "Seasick on Land" – 2:24
5. "Kicking the Heart Out" – 4:15
6. "Postage Stamp World" – 3:19
7. "Sewn Up" – 3:09
8. "Falcon Settles Me" – 2:33
9. "Endgame" – 4:20
10. "Endless Shovel" – 4:47
11. "Man-Revolutionary!" – 2:03
12. "Perfect" – 2:21
