= Out of the Shadows =

Out of the Shadows may refer to:

== Films ==
- Out of the Shadows (unfinished film), an unfinished 1931 film
- Out of the Shadows (2012 film), a documentary film
- Teenage Mutant Ninja Turtles: Out of the Shadows, a 2016 film

== Music ==
- Out of the Shadows (The Shadows album), a 1962 album by the British group The Shadows
- Out of the Shadows (Dave Grusin album), a 1982 album by Dave Grusin
- Out of the Shadows (Billy Joe Royal album), a 1990 album by Billy Joe Royal
- "Out of the Shadows", a song on Iron Maiden's 2006 album A Matter of Life and Death
- Out of the Shadows (Escape the Fate album), a 2023 album by Escape the Fate

== Video games ==
- Out of the Shadows (video game), a 1984 video game
- PK: Out of the Shadows, a 2002 video game
- Teenage Mutant Ninja Turtles: Out of the Shadows (video game), a 2013 video game

== Other uses ==
- Out of the Shadows, a video by the British group Hawkwind
- Alien: Out of the Shadows, a 2014 book by Tim Lebbon
- Star Wars: The High Republic: Out of the Shadows, a 2021 novel by Justina Ireland

== See also ==
- Out of Shadows, a 2010 children's novel
- Out of the Shadow (disambiguation)
