= 10:1 =

EP by Rogue Wave
- Released: August 23, 2005
- Recorded: Tarbox Road Studios, Cassadaga, New York (2003–2005); Oakland, California
- Genre: Indie rock
- Length: 13:49

Rogue Wave chronology
Out of the Shadow (2003)	10:1 (2005)	Descended Like Vultures (2005)

Professional ratings
Review scores
Source	Rating
AllMusic	3.5/5 stars
FasterLouder	2.5/5 stars

10:1 is an EP released by Rogue Wave. It was released August 23, 2005 on Sub Pop Records. 10:1 peaked at number 14 on the Billboard Hot Single Sales chart.

== Track listing ==
All songs written by Zach Rogue.

1. "10:1" – 3:19
2. "Interruptions" – 4:50
3. "Wait for It" – 2:30
4. "Crush the Camera" – 3:00

== Personnel ==
- Zach Rogue - vocals, acoustic guitar, wurlitzer, producer, hammond, rhodes piano
- Pat Spurgeon - bass, drums, autoharp, wind chimes, timpani, guitar effects, percussion
- Bill Racine - producer, engineer, mixing, "guitar mutilation"
- Gram LeBron - rhodes piano, vocals
- Evan Farrell - bass, vocals
- Emily Lazar - mastering
- Jeff Kleinsmith - artwork, design
