= Asleep at Heaven's Gate =

Studio album by Rogue Wave
- Released: September 18, 2007
- Recorded: Forestville, California, U.S.
- Genre: Indie rock
- Length: 56:55
- Label: Brushfire
- Producers: Zach Rogue, Roger Moutenot

Rogue Wave chronology
Descended Like Vultures (2005)	Asleep at Heaven's Gate (2007)	Permalight (2010)

Singles from Asleep at Heaven's Gate
- 1. "Lake Michigan" Released: September 10, 2007; 2. "Chicago X 12" Released: April 28, 2008; 3. "Like I Needed" Released: July 28, 2008

Professional ratings
Review scores
Source	Rating
Allmusic	2.5/5 stars
Pitchfork	(6.9/10)
Twisted Ear	4/5 stars

Asleep at Heaven's Gate is the third album by American indie rock band Rogue Wave. It was released to average reviews on September 18, 2007. It was produced by Roger Moutenot. "Lake Michigan", the first single from the album, was featured in a TV commercial for Microsoft's second-generation Zune music players, and was included on the original soundtrack of The Secret Life of Walter Mitty. "Electro-Socket Blues" is a bonus track and can be found on the UK release of the album, whilst “The Show”, “I Can Die", "Electro-Socket Blues", and “All You Need Is Love”, are all available on the remastered and expanded version of the album, which can be found on iTunes. “Chicago x 12” is also featured in the eighth season of Scrubs in the episode “Their Story II”.

== Track listing ==
All songs written by Zach Rogue.

1. "Harmonium" – 6:36
2. "Like I Needed" – 3:02
3. "Chicago X 12" – 5:39
4. "Lake Michigan" – 3:48
5. "Lullaby" – 4:01
6. "Christians in Black" – 3:54
7. "Own Your Own Home" – 5:04
8. "Ghost" – 5:11
9. "Missed" – 3:29
10. "Fantasies" – 4:30
11. "Phonytown" – 5:56
12. "Cheaper Than Therapy" – 5:30
13. "The Show" (Bonus Track) – 4:24
14. "I Can Die" (Bonus Track) – 3:39
15. "Electro-Socket Blues" (Bonus Track) – 3:59
16. "All You Need Is Love" (Bonus Track) – 3:25
