= In the Land of Women (soundtrack) =

Film score by Stephen Trask
- Released: April 17, 2007
- Genre: Soundtrack; Film scores
- Length: 52:32
- Label: Lakeshore Records

In the Land of Women is the soundtrack of the film of the same name, released on April 17, 2007. Original music for the film was composed by Stephen Trask.

== Track listing ==
1. "A Good Idea at the Time" – OK Go (3:12)
2. "Spanish Stroll" – Mink DeVille (3:39)
3. "Publish My Love" – Rogue Wave (3:44)
4. "Goods (All in Your Head)" – Mates of State (4:45)
5. "When I Write the Book" – Rockpile (3:18)
6. "Hey You" – Tommy Stinson (5:22)
7. "Beautiful Girl" – INXS (3:30)
8. "Try Whistling This" – Neil Finn (4:13)
9. "Harness and Wheel" – The Kingsbury Manx 2:55)
10. "Lester Hayes" – Lateef and the Chief (4:18)
11. "Blending In" – Mike Viola (3:52)
12. "Better Sorry Than Safe" – Two Hours Traffic (2:58)
13. "Wanna Get Dead" – Tsar (2:21)
14. "Out of His Mind" – Stephen Trask (1:50)
15. "In the Land of Women" – Stephen Trask (2:35)
