= List of Epic Meal Time episodes =

Epic Meal Time is a Canadian YouTube cooking show known for creating extremely high-calorie meals, generally out of meat products (with particular emphasis on bacon) and including alcohol (especially Jack Daniel's). The series began in Montreal, Quebec, the group's place of origin, but recently, episodes have been filmed in California, where several guest stars, such as Tony Hawk and Smosh, made appearances. Since October 2010, new episodes have been released every Tuesday, with a few exceptions.

Starting on October 19, 2012 on different days, Epic Meal Time broadcasts "Throwback Thursday" or "Flashback Friday" episodes, which are previous episodes with Pop-Up Video-style facts added. In the earlier episodes before his Muscles Glasses persona was created, Alex Perrault's eyes are blocked by a bacon strip while his voice is distorted.

In December 2012, Epic Meal Time spawned a spin-off series titled Epic Chef, inspired by the Food Network series Chopped and hosted by Harley Morenstein. In this series, two chefs have 45 minutes to create a meal using three secret ingredients, a briefcase full of bacon, and the featured alcoholic drink of the day. These episodes are not listed here, as they are not considered Epic Meal Time episodes.

A second spin-off series, Handle It, premiered on March 22, 2013. These episodes, each hosted by one or more members of the main cast, present step-by-step instructions for preparing various recipes with the equipment and methods commonly used in the main series. Handle It episodes are not listed here.

In July 2014, Epic Meal Time debuted their TV series Epic Meal Empire on FYI.

Food energy listings, such as calorie and fat content, are provided in most episodes; not all episodes have this information, due to either insufficient data or not being applicable (as is in the case of 'deleted scenes' episodes).

== 2010 ==
Epic Meal Time episodes released in 2010

| No. | Title | Calories | Fat (grams) | Cost | Original release date |
|---|---|---|---|---|---|
| 1 | "Fast Food Pizza" | 5,210 | 286 | $36.25 | October 17, 2010 |
| 2 | "Angry French Canadian (The greasiest sandwich in Canada)" | 5,343 | 207 | $22.00 | November 1, 2010 |
| 3 | "The Double Kill (The death of the double down)" | 5,214 | 246 | $22.00 | November 8, 2010 |
| 4 | "The Triple Meat Log a.k.a. Massive Meat Log (The Chuck Norris of corndogs)" | 5,826 | 747 | $9.36 | November 15, 2010 |
| 5 | "The TurBaconEpic a.k.a. TurBaconEpic Thanksgiving (A bird in a bird in a bird in a bird in a bird in a pig)" | 79,046 | 3,855 | $580.50 | November 23, 2010 |
| 6 | "Breakfast of Booze a.k.a. Breakfast Fortress (It gets you drunk)" | 18,531 | 1,005 | $95.30 | November 30, 2010 |
| 7 | "Fast Food Sushi (Fast food no sushi bukkake (ファストフードのお寿司ぶっかけ))" | 11,816 | 828 | $94.40 | December 7, 2010 |
| 8 | "Meatball Deathstar (There is no try, only do)" | 14,262 | 1,063 | $85.71 | December 14, 2010 |
| 9 | "The Slaughterhouse (Merry Christmas to teh [sic] Internets)" | 86,997 | 5,581 | $358.10 | December 21, 2010 |
| 10 | "The Black Legend (Fully loaded crepe)" | 19,177 | 684 | $119.50 | December 28, 2010 |

== 2011 ==
Epic Meal Time episodes released in 2011

| No. | Title | Calories | Fat (grams) | Cost | Original release date |
|---|---|---|---|---|---|
| 11 | "Epic Eggroll (Chinese food in a big way)" | 6,378 | 176 | $51.82 | January 4, 2011 |
| 12 | "Chili Four Loko (Tastes like crazy alcohol rainbow pig)" | 46,255 | 3,178 | $230.15 | January 11, 2011 |
| 13 | "Meat Salad (Let's toss one)" | 28,031 | 2,096 | $230.15 | January 18, 2011 |
| 14 | "Sloppy Big Ben Roethlisberger (Breaking the 100,000 calorie barrier)" | 138,226 | 8,452 | $631.75 | February 1, 2011 |
The Epic Meal Time YouTube channel omits "Big Ben" from the title.
| 15 | "Tequila Taco Night (feat. El Gigante)" | 98,824 | 9,082 | $822.24 | February 8, 2011 |
| 16 | "Chocolate and Hearts (Love Special)" | 44,189 | 3,123 | $221.54 | February 13, 2011 |
| 17 | "Deleted Scenes (Stop hatin')" | — | — | — | February 22, 2011 |
| 18 | "Maximum Protein Experience (Getting Jacked... no Daniels)" | 29,173 | 2,530 (Protein) | $162.00 | March 1, 2011 |
| 19 | "Meat Building 101 (Making dreams come true)" | 316,847 | 28,968 | $830.32 | March 8, 2011 |
| 20 | "Deleted Scenes 2 (Burgerness)" | — | — | — | March 15, 2011 |
| 21 | "Meat Cars (Miracle whips)" | 23,266 | 1,119 | $98.73 | March 22, 2011 |
| 22 | "Epic Indian Experience (Curry bacon, hater)" | 31,200 | 1,050 | $200.00 | March 29, 2011 |
| 23 | "Sugar Shack (The birthplace of MusclesGlasses)" | 31,200 | 1,375 | $112.00 | April 5, 2011 |
| 24 | "Puzzle of the Lambs (Lamb chops slay-a-long)" | 23,266 | 1,940 | $189.30 | April 12, 2011 |
| 25 | "Mac & Cheese (Player please)" | 10,565 | 630 | $52.10 | April 19, 2011 |
The Epic Meal Time YouTube channel adds the word "Maximum" at the start of the title.
| 26 | "Fast Food Lasagna (Next level fast food usage)" | 71,488 | 5,463 | $285.13 | April 26, 2011 |
| 27 | "Cheesy Grilled Cheese Tower (We're with Deadmau5 hater)" | 7,700 | 241 | $37.50 | May 3, 2011 |
| 28 | "Special Delivery (Happy Mother's Day)" | 33,303 | 2,435 | $269.19 | May 7, 2011 |
| 29 | "Candy BBQ (Drip-drop-drippin)" | 49,885 | 1,018 | $269.19 | May 17, 2011 |
| 30 | "Ninja Turtle Soup (I love eating a turtle)" | 21,336 | 431 | $119.87 | May 24, 2011 |
| 31 | "84 Egg Sandwich (And a blueberry muffin)" | 48,138 | 3,048 | $304.80 | May 30, 2011 |
| 32 | "Epic Hors D'Oeuvres (Epic meals in bite-size form)" | 5,119 | 318 | $29.60 | June 6, 2011 |
| 33 | "The Masta Pasta (With liquor mixture)" | 8,239 | 1,061 | $59.56 | June 13, 2011 |
| 34 | "Drunken Mess Meal (We ain't even cooking)" | 15,514 | 630 | $92.35 | June 20, 2011 |
The Epic Meal Time YouTube channel omits the word "Meal" from the title.
| 35 | "Fast Food Meatloaf (And LIGHTS is here too)" | 34,065 | 1,824 | $205.19 | June 28, 2011 |
| 36 | "Candy Pizza (Drip drop drippin)" | 3,120 | 105 | $20.00 | July 5, 2011 |
| 37 | "Epic Stockyard Burger (Want some liquor and lunch?)" | 35,400 | 2,364 | $159.00 | July 12, 2011 |
| 38 | "Russian Meal Time (Bacon and bullets collabo)" | 42,259 | 2,270 | $268.30 | July 18, 2011 |
| 39 | "Pigs n' Poultry (Lots of sauce)" | 4,290 | 240 | $15.00 | July 26, 2011 |
| 40 | "EpicMealTime at Comic Con (MusclesGlasses vs. Everyone) a.k.a. EpicMealTime LIVE" | — | — | — | July 30, 2011 |
| 41 | "Bacon Bacon Truck (We add MORE bacon)" | 281,964 | 10,900 | $1,629.50 | August 1, 2011 |
| 42 | "The Ostrich Nest (Jack and yolk)" | 15,285 | 206 | $58.30 | August 9, 2011 |
| 43 | "Meat Shield (Protect yo self)" | 8,218 | 765 | $36.00 | August 16, 2011 |
| 44 | "Sausage Fest (No dudes allowed)" | 18,600 | 1,086 | $108.00 | August 23, 2011 |
| 45 | "Epic Chicken Burger Combo (Chicken burger merger burger)" | 81,310 | 5,050 | $354.75 | August 30, 2011 |
| 46 | "West Coast Burger Pile (Now with more magic)" | 20,168 | 2,316 | $181.00 | September 5, 2011 |
| 47 | "Double-Barrel 12-Gauge Hot Dog (Hot dog) a.k.a. 12 Gauge Hot Dog" | 16,429 | 1,390 | $95.19 | September 13, 2011 |
| 48 | "Zombie Meal Time (Brrrraaaaaaaiiinnsss)" | — | — | — | September 20, 2011 |
| 49 | "Big Stupid S'more (Little Debbie's a big slut)" | 73,590 | 6,736 | $360.15 | September 26, 2011 |
| 50 | "French Fry Pizza Salad (F**k salad)" | 6,850 | 505 | $38.50 | October 2, 2011 |
The Epic Meal Time YouTube channel omits the word "Pizza" from the title.
| 51 | "Spam Fries Four Loko (Black-out in a can)" | 13,920 | 879 | $79.20 | October 3, 2011 |
| 52 | "Candy Poutine (Awhatup ganache?!)" | 13,920 | 416 | $128.99 | October 5, 2011 |
| 53 | "Deep Fried Waffle Fries (Chocolate chipped and candied)" | 58,967 | 1,029 | $350.46 | October 5, 2011 |
| 54 | "The Leftovers (The end of French Fry Week)" | 10,000 | — | $50.00 | October 7, 2011 |
| 55 | "Meat Cthulhu (Meatmare5)" | 86,500 | 1,090 | $289.50 | October 10, 2011 |
| 56 | "Fast Food Pizza Cake (Happy 1 Year Birthday EpicMealTime)" | 59,370 | 2,161 | $361.05 | October 18, 2011 |
| 57 | "Meat Mummy (In a steak sarcophagus)" | 189,673 | 15,879 | $559.66 | October 25, 2011 |
| 58 | "Zombie Meal Time (Director's Cut)" | — | — | TBA | October 30, 2011 |
| 59 | "Gentleman's Episode (At Privilege gentleman's club)" | 37,020 | 3,327 | $198.50 | November 1, 2011 |
| 60 | "Fast Food Chinese Food (Next level take-out maneuver)" | 80,966 | 3,657 | $418.79 | November 7, 2011 |
| 61 | "Super Pastry Cake (Big pile of Smosh)" | 60,121 | 3,376 | $327.50 | November 15, 2011 |
| 62 | "Turbaconepicentipede (802,420 calories)" | 802,420 | 68,920 | $5,805.00 | November 22, 2011 |
| 63 | "Meat Garden (I'm 'bout it)" | 81,170 | 4,591 | $238.08 | November 28, 2011 |
| 64 | "Candy Sushi (A fancy taste-bud treat)" | 26,185 | 2,814 | $159.75 | December 5, 2011 |
| 65 | "Happy Meal Time (Epic Grilled Cheese Sandwich)" | 14,280 | 679 | $82.89 | December 12, 2011 |
| 66 | "Bacon Tree (Over two-thousand strips)" | 216,960 | 40,350 | $4035.00 | December 19, 2011 |
| 67 | "Brunch of Booze (For you're [sic] stupid hungover brain)" | 43,256 | 4,287 | $401.35 | December 26, 2011 |

== 2012 ==
Epic Meal Time episodes released in 2012

| No. | Title | Calories | Fat (grams) | Cost | Original release date |
|---|---|---|---|---|---|
| 68 | "Meatzza (For all the Marks)" | 65,312 | 4,847 | $289.80 | January 3, 2012 |
| 69 | "Fast Food Shepherd's Pie (McGangbang included)" | 13,318 | 912 | $56.92 | January 10, 2012 |
| 70 | "Candy Taco Night (with a box of gay baconstrips, dawg)" | 42,864 | 835 | $120.00 | January 17, 2012 |
A special on-screen counter keeps track of the number of times the word "dawg" is used (12 in all).
| 71 | "Meat Ice Cream Party (Russian Meal Time 2)" | 43,830 | 3155 | $204.40 | January 24, 2012 |
| 72 | "Big Dirty Manningwich (Smothered in Brady gravy)" | 34,780 | 2,700 | $152.78 | January 31, 2012 |
| 73 | "Next Level Pies (We take pie and get ~~dumb~~ SMART with it)" | 40,150 | 2,308 | $211.50 | February 7, 2012 |
| 74 | "Super Sloppy Sundae (What you know about love?)" | 190,400 | 10,080 | $854.00 | February 14, 2012 |
| 75 | "Angry French Onion Soup (The greasiest soup)" | 23,915 | 986 | $269.50 | February 21, 2012 |
| 76 | "Meat Farm (Old McDonald's Dirty Grease Farm)" | 48,642 | 3,735 | $204.40 | February 27, 2012 |
| 77 | "Discount Meal Time (Put your bacon where your mouth is)" | See below | See below | See below | March 6, 2012 |
Individual calorie/fat counts: Ghetto Dawg sandwiches: 450 calories / 24 grams fat / $9.00 cost (per sandwich); Necklace of Pizza Pockets: 560 calories / 40 grams fat / $2.00 cost per pocket, plus "infinite coolness"; Hungry Man quesadillas: 1,450 calories / 360 grams fat / $58.50 cost; Fishy Bacon Mac: 12,600 calories / 182 grams fat / $35.70 cost; Pizzception: 6,520 calories / 103 grams fat / $33.00 cost
| 78 | "Green Pancake Potato Stack (The Gary Busey of EpicMealTime episodes)" | 6,299 | 41 | $25.03 | March 13, 2012 |
| 79 | "Extra Footage Green Pancake Potato Stack (ONLY bad drunken footage)" | — | — | — | March 17, 2012 |
A collection of outtakes from the "Green Pancake Potato Stack" episode.
| 80 | "TexMex Lasagna (¿donde en el hater?)" | 30,573 | 2,230 | $131.35 | March 20, 2012 |
| 81 | "BBQ Pie (American Reunion. Of Meat)" | 32,588 | 1,865 | $239.15 | March 27, 2012 |
| 82 | "Fast Food Fluffy Cake (and a fish filet)" | 168,780 | 9,981 | $1,209.39 | April 3, 2012 |
| 83 | "Epic Breakfast Egg Rolls (Chinese omelette)" | 23,478 | 1,089 | $115.99 | April 10, 2012 |
| 84 | "Best Invention Ever" | — | — | — | April 11, 2012 |
Harley gives an update on his invention, the PlateTopper, and demonstrates how to keep fast food items warm by placing them on the hood of his car and using PlateToppers to secure them while he drives around the block.
| 85 | "BBQ Coliseum (Battle to the death)" | 75,396 | 3,206 | $281.95 | April 17, 2012 |
| 86 | "Deleted Scenes 4/20 (This is a gift, don't do drugs)" | — | — | — | April 24, 2012 |
A collection of outtakes from the previous episode.
| 87 | "Bacon Alaska (The future)" | 29,113 | 1,509 | $253.00 | April 24, 2012 |
| 88 | "Meat Sub (No bread, only business)" | 27,970 | 1,354 | $198.53 | May 1, 2012 |
| 89 | "Fastfood Sacrifice (An offering to the return of MusclesGlasses)" | 51,400 | 3,870 | $254.00 | May 7, 2012 |
| 90 | "Zombie Vegan Attack! (The Return of MusclesGlasses Part 1)" | — | — | — | May 14, 2012 |
| 91 | "Boss Bacon Burger (Next level)" | 109,165 | 9,381 | $684.76 | May 15, 2012 |
| 92 | "Peanut Butter & Jelly Archetype (Cut your own crust)" | 21,717 | 1,322 | $109.35 | May 22, 2012 |
This is the first episode to introduce factoids displayed on the bottom of the screen.
| 93 | "Bakery Burger Combo (Brownies, churros and liquor)" | 50,746 | 1,610 | $267.46 | May 29, 2012 |
| 94 | "Ultimate Pizza Sandwich (Why didn't you think of that?)" | 45,133 | 3,262 | $220.05 | June 5, 2012 |
| 95 | "Meat Swiss Rolls (And we don't know a thing about cooking)" | 50,430 | 988 | $380.20 | June 11, 2012 |
| 96 | "Squeaky Grease Sandwiches (We'll trade you a poutine for your dog)" | 25,036 | 920 | $152.39 | June 19, 2012 |
| 97 | "Crispy Tauntaun (Main course of the force)" | 43,135 | 1,584 | $198.88 | June 26, 2012 |
| 98 | "Meat America (Happy 4th of July)" | 73,559 | 2,021 | $221.87 | July 3, 2012 |
| 99 | "Meat Cereal (Unbalance your breakfast)" | 34,553 | 549 | $220.24 | July 10, 2012 |
| 100 | "Fast Food Fondue Mixology (That's a greasy kabab)" | 30,592 | 2,692 | $159.30 | July 17, 2012 |
| 101 | "Steampunk Meal Time (Disregard those who dislike)" | 34,856 | 4,180 | $259.20 | July 24, 2012 |
| 102 | "Pig Face Stew (Next level pork maneuvers)" | 70,110 | 1,690 | $291.73 | July 31, 2012 |
| 103 | "Breakfast Lasagna (And a large coffee)" | 108,950 | 1,965 | $364.75 | August 7, 2012 |
| 104 | "Indian Tex-Mex (Shart Week Day 1)" | 38,760 | 1,830 | $209.75 | August 13, 2012 |
| 105 | "Tex-Mex Indian (Shart Week Day 2)" | 33,230 | 1,760 | $199.74 | August 14, 2012 |
| 106 | "11-Layer Megaton Dip (Shart Week Day 3)" | 53,690 | 1,295 | $488.85 | August 15, 2012 |
| 107 | "Filthy Reuben (Shart Week Day 4)" | 35,790 | 2,460 | $106.35 | August 16, 2012 |
| 108 | "The Leftovers 2 (Shart Week Day 5)/Nacho Taco Pile (Lost footage)" | 25,650 | 1,635 | $109.50 | August 17, 2012 |
Bloopers and outtakes from the past four episodes, as well as a previously unaired meal that was filmed 10 months earlier.
| 109 | "Country Fried Meal Time (The south in the north)" | 53,850 | 1,580 | $278.50 | August 21, 2012 |
| 110 | "The Unbalanced Breakfast (Rise and shine)" | 46,280 | 595 | $206.17 | August 28, 2012 |
| 111 | "Chinese Pizza (Bringing back rice)" | 13,042 | 206 | $59.37 | September 4, 2012 |
| 112 | "Epic Meal Sticks (Everything is better on a stick)" | 38,805 | 565 | $94.00 | September 11, 2012 |
| 113 | "Jamaican Bacon Experience (Pon di kitchen)" | 16,770 | 715 | $109.10 | September 18, 2012 |
| 114 | "FastFood Wellington (Making burgers fancy again)" | 37,850 | 1,292 | $142.00 | September 25, 2012 |
| 115 | "Meat Dragon Egg (Birthing a baby through bacon)" | 45,115 | 465 | $290.00 | October 2, 2012 |
| 116 | "Delicious Autopsy (No probing... ok maybe a little)" | 5,906 | 115 | $1,050 | October 9, 2012 |
| 117 | "Deep Dish Fastfood Pizza (Happy Birthday EpicMealTime)" | 87,850 | 7,942 | $388.05 | October 16, 2012 |
| 118 | "Epic Enchiladas (Patrony Montana)" | 57,832 | 1,135 | $251.04 | October 23, 2012 |
| 119 | "Frankenpig (Happy Halloween)" | 473,200 | 32,914 | $2,039.50 | October 30, 2012 |
| 120 | "BBQ Eggrolls (We're doing this until we die)" | 69,000 | 3,375 | $300.00 | November 6, 2012 |
| 121 | "After-school Special (That happens to be a casserole)" | 39,150 | 2,110 | $215.40 | November 13, 2012 |
| 122 | "Thanksgiving Care Package (Everyone eats)" | 203,994 | 10,482 | $1,799.72 | November 20, 2012 |
| 123 | "Cinnaburger Supreme (Made of sweat and tears... but mostly sweat)" | 57,114 | 3,375 | $214.30 | November 27, 2012 |
| 124 | "Fast Food Ravioli (Ain't nobody putting burgers in ravioli)" | 17,260 | 795 | $83.25 | December 4, 2012 |
| 125 | "Epic Meal Time Cooking Arsenal" | — | — | — | December 8, 2012 |
A short video promoting Epic Meal Time's new line of cookware and first cookbook.
| 126 | "Strength Ultra Man Enhancing Workout Omelette Waffle" | — | 2,635 | $204.80 | December 11, 2012 |
This episode features a sneak preview of the spin-off series Epic Chef.
| 127 | "Breakfast Pizza (Another good idea)" | 42,620 | 2,950 | $169.30 | December 18, 2012 |
| 128 | "Epic Christmas Carol (Who's Carol?)" | 369,600 | 53,850 | $401.50 | December 24, 2012 |
This episode was released on December 24, a Monday, in order to avoid uploading on Christmas.

== 2013 ==
Epic Meal Time episodes released in 2013

| No. | Title | Calories | Fat (grams) | Cost | Original release date |
|---|---|---|---|---|---|
| 129 | "Triple Pancake Fat Stack (To fix your brain) a.k.a. New Years Hangover Cure" | 77,250 | 3,560 | $619.50 | January 1, 2013 |
| 130 | "Friedgooter and Meatburgers (And some animal-style garlic bread)" | 87,840 | 3,090 | $999.92 | January 8, 2013 |
| 131 | "Hotdog Casserole (Or is it a meat loaf?)" | 65,275 | 2,635 | $301.65 | January 15, 2013 |
| 132 | "Fish and Chips Filet (We kidnapped Jamie Oliver)" | 59,144 | 2,840 | $221.95 | January 22, 2013 |
| 133 | "Flacco Taco (60 lbs Superbowl [sic] taco)" | 60,795 | 2,935 | $332.50 | January 29, 2013 |
| 134 | "New Delhi Experience (We're back to bhaji)" | 60,320 | 1,580 | $219.50 | February 5, 2013 |
| 135 | "A Date With Bacon (Bacon's my bottom bitch)" | 26,199 | 2,168 | $157.20 | February 12, 2013 |
| 136 | "The Burly Beaver Sandwich (A remedy for homesickness)" | 21,430 | 2,540 | $110.57 | February 19, 2013 |
| 137 | "The Luther Lasagna (Fat on top of fat on top of fat)" | 64,388 | 4,649 | $291.43 | February 25, 2013 |
| 138 | "Mega Rib Sandwich (For a limited time only)" | 37,948 | 1,695 | $256.40 | March 5, 2013 |
| 139 | "Hulk Turds (Happy Saint Patrick's Day)" | 10,660 | 1,567 | $58.60 | March 12, 2013 |
| 140 | "Chocolate Breakfast (Go balance yourself)" | 8,724 | 380 | $51.39 | March 19, 2013 |
| 141 | "Bacon Beer Can Chicken (Tell your dad to cut back on the booze)" | 26,950 | 5,404 | $219.30 | March 26, 2013 |
| 142 | "Meat Tank" | 22,024 | 1,505 | $125.36 | April 2, 2013 |
| 143 | "100-Pound Chocolate Bar" | 167,087 | 9,270 (fat); 19,468 (sugar) | $784.50 | April 9, 2013 |
| 144 | "Meat Cake" | 91,036 | 6,187 | $461.25 | April 16, 2013 |
| 145 | "S'mores Burger" | 55,460 | 2,610 | $201.46 | April 23, 2013 |
| 146 | "Slop Tart" | 180,000 | — | See below | April 30, 2013 |
The show donated $0.01 to Action Against Hunger per calorie in this meal, for a total of $1,800.00.
| 147 | "The Edible Sombrero" | 25,490 | 1,040 | $119.35 | May 7, 2013 |
| 148 | "Bacon Arachnid" | 169,823 | 4,239 | $523.38 | May 14, 2013 |
| 149 | "The Super Swine Submarine Sandwich" | 20,167 | 1,342 | $68.92 | May 21, 2013 |
| 150 | "Powerbox F*cktron Delta 3000 a.k.a. Next-Gen Video Game Console" | 98,958 | 6,323 | $362.75 | May 28, 2013 |
| 151 | "Sushi Pizza" | 15,425 | 365 | $54.25 | June 4, 2013 |
| 152 | "50-Pound Grilled Cheese Sandwich" | 68,128 | 4,820 | $320.08 | June 11, 2013 |
| 153 | "Canadian Lasagna" | 48,884 | 2,256 | $318.05 | June 18, 2013 |
| 154 | "Chocolate Treasure Chest" | 54,200 | 1,683 | $231.43 | June 25, 2013 |
| 155 | "Meat Canada" | 95,280 | 3,198 | $513.42 | July 1, 2013 |
This episode was released one day ahead of the usual Tuesday schedule in order to coincide with Canada Day. The calorie/fat counts do not include three hamburger "pucks" blocked by the hockey goalie that the cast assembled from meat.
| 156 | "Tex-Mex Breakfast" | 17,481 | 886 | $101.50 | July 9, 2013 |
| 157 | "Chinese Burger" | 27,100 | 1,686 | $147.95 | July 16, 2013 |
| 158 | "Candy Fashion" | 32,000 | 1,000 | $100.00 | July 23, 2013 |
| 159 | "Meatball Deathsub (A 25 lb sandwich)" | 21,572 | 1,446 | $212.46 | July 30, 2013 |
| 160 | "Dishwasher Lasagna (We cooked our food in the dishwasher)" | 18,114 | 969 | $36.30 | August 6, 2013 |
| 161 | "Meat Castle (Hail to the king, baby)" | 47,120 | 1,460 | $283.56 | August 13, 2013 |
| 162 | "Squeezeburger Pie (Our little bundle of joy)" | 52,390 | 3,288 | $269.50 | August 20, 2013 |
| 163 | "Inside-Out Breakfast Burrito Burrito (Sacrifices must be made)" | 53,646 | 3,578 | $473.12 | August 27, 2013 |
The title on the Epic Meal Time YouTube channel omits the word "Breakfast."
| 164 | "Philly Cheese Cake (Dave, insert subtitle here)" | 63,222 | 4,086 | $288.06 | September 3, 2013 |
| 165 | "Hella 'Tella Chili (Not your grandma's chili)" | 104,870 | 5,932 (fat); 10,321 (sugar) | $631.01 | September 10, 2013 |
| 166 | "Pasta Burger (The biggest pasta burger in the whole world) a.k.a. The Biggest Pasta Burger in the World" | 64,152 | 3,422 | $206.22 | September 17, 2013 |
| 167 | "60 lbs 6 piece (Ya it comes with a toy bitch)" | 52,800 | 4,080 | $288.00 | September 24, 2013 |
| 168 | "Shepherd's Thai (We haven't visited a doctor's office in over 3 years)" | 43,070 | 1,330 | $216.60 | October 1, 2013 |
| 169 | "REALLY Big Twinkie (Made from the corpses of 100 twinkies)" | 66,820 | 3,092 | $219.48 | October 8, 2013 |
| 170 | "Air, Sea and Landsgana [sic] (The G.I. Joe of Lasagna)" | 63,286 | 6,954 | $368.75 | October 15, 2013 |
The title on the Epic Meal Time YouTube channel spells the last word as "Landsagna."
| 171 | "Pig Pirate Ship (We're going to raid a cruise ship)" | 256,149 | 13,630 | $1,091.65 | October 22, 2013 |
| 172 | "Fastfood Scarecrow (Happy Halloween)" | 43,842 | 9,346 | $219.60 | October 29, 2013 |
| 173 | "Meat Volcano (Where you at Vesuvius?)" | 84,882 | 6,737 | $420.35 | November 5, 2013 |
| 174 | "Pork Parmesan (We parm s#*! up)" | 155,722 | 6,908 | $922.12 | November 12, 2013 |
| 175 | "NASCAR Hogster (Where pigs drive)" | 207,875 | 13,311 | $1,633.01 | November 19, 2013 |
| 176 | "Bacon Cornucopia (Happy Thanksgiving!!!)" | 41,400 | 1,570 | $131.56 | November 26, 2013 |
| 177 | "Meat-Feuille (Translation: Meat Paper)" | 41,400 | 3,340 | $25.879 | December 3, 2013 |
| 178 | "Candy Bacon Chocolate Chip Ice Cream Cake Sandwich (The Internet is its mother)" | 98,000 | 8,000 | $680.00 | December 10, 2013 |
The title on the Epic Meal Time YouTube channel is shortened to "Ice Cream Cake Sandwich."
| 179 | "Fluffer Nutter Tower (Better bring your Epipen)" | 59,720 | 4,337 | $269.71 | December 17, 2013 |
| 180 | "Bacon-Wrapped Sleigh (We used pigs instead of reindeer)" | 575,600 | 21,017 | $3,560.20 | December 24, 2013 |
| 181 | "Bacon City (Happy New Years 2014)" | 16,920 | 384 | $120.41 | December 31, 2013 |

== 2014 ==
Epic Meal Time episodes released in 2014

| No. | Title | Calories | Fat (grams) | Cost | Original release date |
|---|---|---|---|---|---|
| 182 | "Bacon Ham Cordon Bleu (A French classic reborn) a.k.a. Ham Cordon Bleu" | 33,800 | 2,387 | $215.50 | January 4, 2014 |
| 183 | "The Pouter Toolbox (The ultimate grease monkey meal)" | 38,550 | 2,192 | $254.04 | January 7, 2014 |
| 184 | "Junk Food Sushi Cone (Yeah...we rolled up again)" | 28,850 | 1,400 | $188.50 | January 14, 2014 |
| 185 | "Cheeseburger Pizza (The world will be a better place)" | 44,330 | 3,424 | $213.33 | January 21, 2014 |
| 186 | "Pork Cheetos (Made with real pork and cheese)" | 45,575 | 1,572 (fat); 24,150 mg caffeine | $189.95; 50% caffeine | January 28, 2014 |
| 187 | "Epic Meal Time Cookbook - You Did This" | - | - | - | January 30, 2014 |
A short video promoting Epic Meal Time's second cookbook.
| 188 | "Snack Stadium (Bud Light Hotel in New York City)" | 276,380 | 10,504 | $1,505.70 | February 3, 2014 |
| 189 | "Ballpark Pizza (The Bambino of pizzas)" | 23,650 | 1,092 | $128.99 | February 11, 2014 |
| 190 | "Fast Food Pierogi and Cheeseburger Borscht (Winter sports spectacle)" | 36,385 | 2,093 | $215.02 | February 18, 2014 |
| 191 | "The Trailer Park Sandwich (With some Trailer Park Boys)" | 43,536 | 3,546 | $395.76 | February 25, 2014 |
| 192 | "Epic Meal Time Cookbook - Pre-Order It Now!" | - | - | - | March 2, 2014 |
A short video announcing that the second cookbook is available for pre-orders.
| 193 | "The Steak & Egger Sandwich (Cook with us if you want to live)" | 78,583 | 4,172 | $379.50 | March 4, 2014 |
| 194 | "Pizza Cheeseburger (Mixing words together is safer then [sic] cloning)" | 42,360 | 2,897 | $200.52 | March 11, 2014 |
| 195 | "The Four-Beef Clover (Happy St. Patrick's Day)" | 104,290 | 3,950 | $558.10 | March 17, 2014 |
| 196 | "The Epic Eight (Sports bracket for food)" | 117,379 | 4,172 | $981.43 | March 25, 2014 |
The calorie/fat totals are for eight meals together: Fast Food Italian Lasagna, Crunchy Taco Tacos, 3-Meat Cheesy Enchiladas, Sweet & Sour Chicken and Chicken Fried Rice Eggroll, Triple Cheeseburger Macaroni Cheeseburger, Chicken Fettucine Alfredo Ravioli, Stuffed Crispy Chicken Parmesan, and Buffalo Chicken Helper Bold Pizza.
| 197 199 | "Epic Meal Time: Behind the Scenes" | - - - | - - - | - - - | March 27, 2014; March 28, 2014; March 29, 2014 |
Three collections of outtakes and deleted footage to mark the official release of the second Epic Meal Time cookbook. The titles in the YouTube channel are, in order, "Epic Fun Time," "Epic Hilarious Time," and "Epic ROFL Time."
| 200 | "Epic Pretzel Party (Funky reggae pretzel party)" | 42,280 | 2,050 | $591.44 | April 1, 2014 |
| 201 | "The All Bacon Burger (All bacon everything)" | 63,098 | 5,162 | $340.65 | April 8, 2014 |
| 202 | "Coffee Breakfast (2 sugars 1 milk)" | 20,800 | 123 cups of coffee | $123.00 | April 15, 2014 |
| 203 | "Ultimate Club Sandwich (With extra mayo and bacon)" | 170,360 | 8,520 | $752.00 | April 22, 2014 |
| 204 | "Kaiserschwarzenegger Protein Tank (Judgement day)" | 88,754 | 2,999 (fat); 750 (protein) | $852.00 | April 29, 2014 |
| 205 | "Tortilla Chip Pizza (Remarkably stupid)" | 34,913 | 2,618 | $185.05 | May 6, 2014 |
Includes a short rap video by the cast entitled "I Wrote a Cookbook."
| 206 | "I Wrote a Cookbook a.k.a. Epic Meal Time - I Don't Know How to Cook" | - | - | - | May 9, 2014 |
A standalone version of the video from the previous episode.
| 207 | "Lasagna Lasagna (Get it, a lasagna inside a lasagna?)" | 78,450 | 2,700 | $520.00 | May 13, 2014 |
| 208 | "Burger Bar (Or pouch or pocket whatever, we eat it)" | 133,446 | 10,690 | $741.79 | May 20, 2014 |
| 209 | "Lamburgini Linguine (Best believe we got sliding doors)" | 73,624 | 3,921 | $503.38 | May 27, 2014 |
| 210 | "Doughnut Fusion (Next-level baker's dozen)" | 23,350 | 1,185 | $169.50 | June 3, 2014 |
| 211 | "The Great Nutella Pyramid (Built with a protractor)" | 72,770 | 2,490 | $281.60 | June 10, 2014 |
| 212 | "Pig in a Blanket (A good pig deserves to be tucked in)" | 39,015 | 2,100 | $318.00 | June 17, 2014 |
| 213 | "BBQ Breakfast (BBQ and breakfast any time of the day)" | 42,376 | 1,386 | $152.02 | June 24, 2014 |
| 214 | "The Sharpshooter (For the Hitman)" | 49,450 | 3,605 | $234.36 | July 1, 2014 |
| 215 | "The Patriot Burger (This burger's colors don't run)" | 94,528 | 4,873 | $885.24 | July 7, 2014 |
| 216 | "Peanut Butter and Jelly Cake (People with arachibutyrophobia beware)" | 52,798 | 3,316 | $291.13 | July 15, 2014 |
| 217 | "Epic Meal Empire Exclusive First Look" | - | - | - | July 22, 2014 |
A short tour of the Epic Meal Empire set and kitchen equipment, followed by a preview collection of clips from the show.
| 218 | "Poultry Salad (#*@% salad...again)" | 37,580 | 2,150 | $234.75 | July 28, 2014 |
| 219 | "Baoman (He can't melt but he can be eaten)" | 51,593 | 4,106 | $287.50 | August 5, 2014 |
| 220 | "Mega Oreo (There will be no milk)" | 146,800 | 8,475 | $661.60 | August 12, 2014 |
| 221 | "Nutella Lasagna (Internet loves Nutella bro)" | 44,124 | 2,028 | $201.60 | August 19, 2014 |
| 222 | "Candy Castle (This ain't candy land)" | 67,102 | 3,612 | $226.78 | August 26, 2014 |
| 223 | "Sushi Poutine (Making sushi dreams a reality)" | 38,575 | 2,560 | $219.30 | September 2, 2014 |
| 224 | "Chinese BBQ (Invented by young Sauce Boss)" | 36,080 | 1,837 | $249.07 | September 9, 2014 |
| 225 | "Deep Fried Mac & Cheese Cake (We TV now, but we still Internet every Tuesday)" | 31,200 | 1,375 | $112.00 | September 16, 2014 |
| 226 | "Tex-Mex Sushi (Crossing culinary borders)" | 40,620 | 3,834 | $363.62 | September 23, 2014 |
| 227 | "Breakfast Log Cabin (In the woods...)" | 55,532 | 4,618 | $278.96 | September 30, 2014 |
| 228 | "Parmesan Parfait (Goldilocks is a criminal)" | 33,622 | 1,091 | $204.68 | October 7, 2014 |
| 229 | "Fastfood Indian (No naan required)" | 33,622 | 1,091 | $103.40 | October 14, 2014 |
| 230 | "Fast Food Meatloaf Lasagna (So comfortable you'll never know it hit you)" | 136,226 | 13,673 | $814.73 | October 21, 2014 |
| 231 | "Rest in Pizza (You bury your dog we bury our meals) a.k.a. R.I.P." | 206,115 | 17,972 | $1,440.00 | October 28, 2014 |
The gang cooks miniature versions of 10 past meals and buries them in a graveyard of ground beef with pizza tombstones. Meals featured: TurBaconEpic, Fast Food Lasagna, Candy BBQ, Triple Meat Log, Fast Food Pizza, Double Kill, Meatball Deathstar, Angry French Canadian, Epic Eggroll, Fast Food Sushi.
| 232 | "Pumpkin Spice Pizza Cake (Adopt a pumpkin before it's too late)" | 63,984 | 4,175 | $338.65 | November 4, 2014 |
| 233 | "Italian Breakfast (We promise no Godfather references)" | 29,202 | 1,984 | $350.46 | November 11, 2014 |
| 234 | "Epic Meal Empire Is Back!!!" | - | - | - | November 17, 2014 |
A short preview collection of clips from the second season of Epic Meal Empire.
| 235 | "Breakfast Italian (There IS a difference between Italian Breakfast and Breakfast Italian)" | 21,315 | 1,159 | $114.67 | November 18, 2014 |
| 236 | "Thanksgiving Voltron (Animals assemble)" | 54,140 | 1,153 | $350.00 | November 25, 2014 |
| 237 | "Korean BBQ Lasagna (Also starring James Franco and Seth Rogen)" | 33,083 | 2,169 | $168.79 | December 2, 2014 |
| 238 | "General Tsonut Chicken Burger (Generally speaking, this is Tso-not how to lose weight)" | 46,134 | 2,355 | $211.65 | December 9, 2014 |
The title on the Epic Meal Time YouTube channel omits the word "Chicken."
| 239 | "Epic Meal Time - Epic Meal Empire (Official Video)" | - | - | - | December 16, 2014 |
A rap video by the cast.
| 240 | "X-mas Poul-tree (No trees were harmed in the making of this episode) a.k.a. Christmas Poul-Tree" | 100,774 | 5,793 | $631.20 | December 23, 2014 |
| 241 | "Bacon Cheeseburger Inception (Something like those Russian dolls except...food)" | 72,710 | 4,706 | $388.10 | December 30, 2014 |

== 2015 ==
Starting with episode #284, the "Next time, we eat..." ending is no longer used. Also, starting with episode #286, episodes end with a plug for Harley's YouTube channel unless otherwise noted.

Epic Meal Time episodes released in 2015

| No. | Title | Calories | Fat (grams) | Cost | Original release date |
|---|---|---|---|---|---|
| 242 | "Meat Ice Cream Cone (Coming soon to a stove near you)" | 53,919 | 2,336 | $216.35 | January 6, 2015 |
| 243 | "Empire Steak Building (No dads should be offended that this costs more then [sic] their paycheck)" | 102,173 | 2,277 | $957.35 | January 13, 2015 |
| 244 | "Daddy Meal Time (Don't tell our moms)" | 57,266 | 3,854 | $261.85 | January 20, 2015 |
Guest appearance by the fathers of Harley, Epic Mook, and Cousin Dave.
| 245 | "Couch Potato (Sofa, so good)" | 105,608 | 4,886 | $422.67 | January 27, 2015 |
The calorie/fat counts do not include the accompanying sandwiches made by the cast.
| 246 | "Fast Food Aquarium (Tanks for dinner)" | 94,268 | 638 | $135.38 | February 3, 2015 |
| 247 | "Dessert Desert Island (The sweet retreat you can eat)" | 75,300 | 3,020 (sugar) | $351.05 | February 10, 2015 |
The title on the Epic Meal Time YouTube channel replaces "Desert" with "Deserted."
| 248 | "Wacky Taco Tuesday (DEEZ tacos are NUTS)" | 35,931 | 1,604 | $285.99 | February 17, 2015 |
| 249 | "Ultimate Pizza Experience (We're showing pizza the respect it deserves)" | 29,544 | 1,015 | $228.63 | February 24, 2015 |
| 250 | "Country Munchies Cooking (Late night Southern cooking)" | 33,556 | 1,295 | $129.50 | March 3, 2015 |
The title on the Epic Meal Time YouTube channel omits the word "Cooking."
| 251 | "Pizza Palace (You are now eating with royalty)" | 72,532 | 3,303 | $298.85 | March 10, 2015 |
| 252 | "Greenzagna (It's amazing what food coloring can do)" | 32,551 | 1,226 | $296.55 | March 17, 2015 |
| 253 | "Big Mac Loaf (A poem to fast food)" | 105,200 | 8,145 | $632.00 | March 24, 2015 |
| 254 | "Cheeseburger Rainbow Cake (No rainbows were harmed in the making of this video) a.k.a. Candy Bacon Cheeseburger Rainbow Cake" | 103,462 | 6,010 | $640.00 | March 31, 2015 |
| 255 | "Dirt Pie (The best Earth on Earth)" "Meat Block (Sorry about that...)" | Infinite (Friendship Multiplier); 63,940 | - 7,753 | See Below $352.01 | April 7, 2015 |
Harley and the gang cook a vegetarian "Dirt Pie" while dressed in golf shirts and khakis. Once Harley comes to his senses, he throws it out and everyone reverts to their normal appearance to cook the Meat Block.
| 256 | "Breakfast Chicken Wings (Cock-a-doodle-dead)" | 30,907 | 1,896 | $206.07 | April 14, 2015 |
| 257 | "Sandwich Sushi ("That's How We Roll"...is a phrase that people need to stop saying)" | 16,320 | 936 | $138.42 | April 21, 2015 |
| 258 | "Super Breakfast Sandwich (Available all day snitches!)" | 83,032 | 4,675 | $401.75 | April 28, 2015 |
| 259 | "Pizza Plane (Buckle up and enjoy the in-flight entertainment)" | 122,300 | 2,835 | $693.75 | May 5, 2015 |
| 260 | "Epic Quesarito (A burrito inside of a quesadilla)" | 38,810 | 2,460 | $179.25 | May 12, 2015 |
| 261 | "Chip Brick Burger (Josh is a GENIUS)" | 129,820 | 14,480 | $928.00 | May 19, 2015 |
| 262 | "Nutella Doughnut Burger (Respect the tella)" | 88,330 | 4,422 | $539.29 | May 26, 2015 |
| 263 | "Country Fried Cake (No more accents beyond this point...promise)" | 58.050 | 7,180 | $651.43 | June 2, 2015 |
| 264 | "Sushi Lasagna Cake (Josh's original idea. Definitely NOT stolen from his Japanese gf)" | 47,386 | 547 | $115.47 | June 9, 2015 |
| 265 | "Philly Cheese Steak Pizza (The jokes get better)" | 72,369 | 7,622 | $466.35 | June 16, 2015 |
| 266 | "All Day Poutine (Conquer your day in one meal)" | 31,629 | 2,081 | $157.89 | June 23, 2015 |
| 267 | "Poutine Pizza (Happy Canada Day to all)" | 50,434 | 3,476 | $261.95 | June 30, 2015 |
| 268 | "Bacon Bomb Dog (Fully loaded and aimed to feed)" | 89,992 | 4,189 | $568.32 | July 7, 2015 |
| 269 | "Shepherd's Pie Sandwich (Or is it a burger?)" | 101,287 | 5,158 | $900.33 | July 14, 2015 |
| 270 | "Devil'd Pizza Pocket (Is that pizza in your pocket or are you horngry?)" | 28,194 | 2,032 | $180.55 | July 21, 2015 |
| 271 | "Grilled Cheesecake Sandwich (Remember you saw this here first)" | 46,642 | 2,431 | $267.99 | July 28, 2015 |
| 272 | "Mexican Lasagana [sic] (Trust us, we're absolutely sure we haven't already done this)" | 87,623 | 5,699 | $490.85 | August 4, 2015 |
The title on the Epic Meal Time YouTube channel spells "Lasagna" correctly.
| 273 | "Ice Cream Lasagna (Don't worry we didn't put it in the oven)" | 66,105 | 4,404 | $388.60 | August 11, 2015 |
| 274 | "PB&J Country Meal Time (We think you're ready for this jelly)" | 18,772 | 1,086 | $83.14 | August 18, 2015 |
| 275 | "Lobster Burger (We stuff the seven seas between some buns)" | 65,670 | 3,843 | $827.39 | August 25, 2015 |
| 276 | "Cup Quake (Cup Quake 2 will have way better graphics)" | 56,789 | 3,447 | $325.62 | September 1, 2015 |
| 277 | "84 Cheeseburger Cheeseburger (Formerly 85 Cheeseburger Cheeseburger)" | 64,538 | 3,928 | $315.38 | September 8, 2015 |
| 278 | "Fast Food Enchiladas (Some fast food meat comes from a drawer)" | 70,111 | 3,546 | $354.60 | September 15, 2015 |
This episode includes an advertisement for "Bacon Strips"-themed mobile phone covers.
| 279 | "Panquakes (Syrup game on point) a.k.a. Panquake" | 61,051 | 3,954 | $360.10 | September 22, 2015 |
| 280 | "The Game Changer (Food inside of food inside of food inside of food...)" | 55.490 | 3,074 | $538.50 | September 29, 2015 |
| 281 | "The Caesar Bloodbath (US title: Epic Bloody Mary)" | 140,856 | 8,568 | $928.65 | October 6, 2015 |
Harley does not take part in the cooking or eating, instead providing written/voice-over instructions for the rest of the guys.
| 282 | "Porksagna (Happy 5-year birthday to us you little snitches) a.k.a The Last Episode of Epic Meal Time" | 95,735 | 3,165 | $602.01 | October 12, 2015 |
Guest appearance by Muscles Glasses. Instead of a "Next time, we eat..." line, this episode ends with credits for Harley and the gang.
| 283 | "Meat Hydra (Beauty and the beast without the beauty)" | 43,808 | 1,276 | $365.67 | October 20, 2015 |
| 284 | "Meatmare (Meat. What dreams are made of.)" | 117,655 | 4,680 | $968.56 | October 27, 2015 |
| 285 | "Burgerlesque (In honor of the Black Label Bacon Strip Show)" | 276,452 | 16,904 | $958.20 | November 3, 2015 |
Guest appearance by Muscles Glasses.
| 286 | "Fast Food Clump (Fatamari)" | 36,670 | 2,570 | $205.70 | November 10, 2015 |
| 287 | "Rib-Stuffed Rib Slab (Big rib swinging)" | 51,400 | 2,640 | $364.00 | November 17, 2015 |
Guest appearance by Muscles Glasses.
| 288 | "Thanksgiving Club Sandwich (Going up on a Tuesday)" | 67,439 | 2,417 | $798.75 | November 24, 2015 |
| 289 | "100-Pound Pizza (One metric 13-year-old)" | 150,570 | 9,783 | $1,015.00 | December 1, 2015 |
| 290 | "Chinese Food Lasagna (Shout-out to the Yu Dynasty)" | 140,830 | 5,220 | $649.87 | December 8, 2015 |
| 291 | "Star Wars: The Hunger Awakens" | 70,861 | 5,116 | $259.51 | December 15, 2015 |
The cast creates a giant meatball version of the droid BB-8, from the film Star Wars: The Force Awakens.
| 292 | "Randolph the Dead Nose Reindeer (Beautiful food & delicious ladies)" | 202,268 | 4,235 | $1,069.35 | December 22, 2015 |
This episode ends without a plug for Harley's YouTube channel.
| 293 | "Jamaican Jerk Burger (Blaze it up!)" | 84,967 | 1,876 | $297.78 | December 29, 2015 |

== 2016 ==
Starting with #306, episodes include commentary from the guys as they eat the finished product. Starting with #311, episodes do not end with a plug for Harley's YouTube channel unless otherwise noted.

Epic Meal Time episodes released in 2016

| No. | Title | Calories | Fat (grams) | Cost | Original release date |
|---|---|---|---|---|---|
| 294 | "Two Headed Pig (Sauce Boss and his nightmares)" | 66,045 | 1,289 | $338.32 | January 5, 2016 |
| 295 | "Surf & Turf Sandwich (The French are coming) a.k.a. 1000$ Steak Bun Lobster Sandwich" | 75,636 | 2,648 | 56,892 | January 12, 2016 |
| 296 | "French Toast Pizza Quesadillas (Mark Ruffalo's idea)" | 79,216 | 3,585 | $368.65 | January 19, 2016 |
| 297 | "$1000 for French Toast (There's a lot of gold)" | $2,646.00 (total cost) | - | - | January 26, 2016 |
The gang cooks a single piece of French toast, using expensive ingredients and serving it on an iPad Pro instead of a plate.
| 298 | "Nacho Chicken Sandwich (Canada has a football league too - Google it!!) a.k.a. Ultimate Super Bowl Sandwich" | 98,778 | 4,016 | $605.80 | February 2, 2016 |
This episode ends without a plug for Harley's YouTube channel.
| 299 | "Cheesiest Mac & Cheese (Over 50 cheeses in this bad boy!!!)" | 5,000 | 500 | $45.00 | February 9, 2016 |
| 300 | "What's in the box? (One of these delivery boys is about to become a delivery man) a.k.a. Epic Delivery Prank!!!" | 261,996 | 20,618 | $1,357.69 | February 16, 2016 |
Harley visits three pizza delivery places (Pizza Hut, Domino's, and Mory's Pizza) and asks each one to put together the most outrageous meal possible for $100. He has all three orders delivered at once, and he, Prince Atari, and Lemme Kno judge them with the drivers present. They declare a tie between Pizza Hut and Mory's and give a $100 tip to each of the three drivers.
| 301 | "Epic Butter Spread (The Nutella Killer) a.k.a. 50+ Spreads Better Than Cookie Butter!!!" | 13,872 | 1,414 | $58.00 | February 23, 2016 |
Harley and the guys make and taste-test butter-based spreads incorporating dozens of different foods.
| 302 | "Candy Garden (Welcome to sweetopia)" | 64,746 | 5,178 (sugar) | $137.83 | March 1, 2016 |
| 303 | "The Most Exclusive Wings (Wings & Tings Gyuk Gyuk!!!) a.k.a. The Most Exclusive Chicken Wings" | 14,956 | 1,189 | $80.23 | March 8, 2016 |
| 304 | "11 Grilled Cheese in One (Layers and layers of greatness) a.k.a. Grilled Cheese^11" | 17,980 | 2,770 | $98.88 | March 15, 2016 |
| 305 | "Meatballer (We got all the dough baby!)" | 130,756 | 9,813 | $1,286.32 | March 22, 2016 |
| 306 | "Pizza Pie Sandwich (Sandwich made of pizza pies) a.k.a. Pizza Pie" | 76,487 | 4,879 | $487.68 | March 29, 2016 |
| 307 | "Cheeseburger Bento Box (The finest of fantasies)" | 34,245 | 3,123 | $206.66 | April 5, 2016 |
Filmed on location in Tokyo, with appearances by Final Fantasy XV director Hajime Tabata and his development team. This episode ends without a plug for Harley's YouTube channel.
| 308 | "Big Macaroni Burger (Ameer wore his good pants!)" | 59,789 | 1,904 | $330.23 | April 12, 2016 |
| 309 | "Pizza Tower (I'm not a businessman, I'm a business, man...)" | 70,205 | 3,262 | $518.32 | April 19, 2016 |
| 310 | "Epic Protein Pancake Stack (The ultimate stack)" | 37,865 | 3,745 (protein); 618 (fat) | $50.00 (carbs) $36.66 (protein) | April 26, 2016 |
| 311 | "Power Pork Patty (100% pork product prism)" | 81,435 | 2,879 | $554.14 | May 3, 2016 |
| 312 | "Filipino Cheesesteak (Mabuhay)" | 150,739 | 6,255 | $548.55 | May 10, 2016 |
| 313 | "Gold-Burger (For your alcoholic coach doing community service)" | 2,538 | 139 | $560 | May 17, 2016 |
The parts of this meal are wrapped in $600 worth of 24-karat gold foil.
| 314 | "Sushi Pizza Fusion (Step yo cooking game up sensei) a.k.a. Pizza Sushi Fusion" | 35,783 | 353 | $295.46 | May 24, 2016 |
Includes clips from the film Teenage Mutant Ninja Turtles: Out of the Shadows.
| 315 | "Montre-ALL (In my hometown...) a.k.a. Montre-All Sandwich" | 18,036 | 1,189 | $97.65 | May 31, 2016 |
Ends with a plug for Harley's YouTube channel.
| 316 | "Carboload (30 minutes of energy followed by a serious nap)" | 46,109 | 3,678 (carbs) | $316.35; 50% energy | June 7, 2016 |
Filmed on location at the Cloudcade game development studio in Saint-Lambert, Quebec.
| 317 | "Chinese Food Breakfast (Shout out to Lemme Sho)" | 29,562 | 1,556 | $320.69 | June 14, 2016 |
Ends with a plug for Harley's YouTube channel.
| 318 | "Epic 3000 Piece Pull-Apart (More rolls than your dad when he's putting socks on)" | 79,129 | 2,737 | $409.32 | June 21, 2016 |
Ends with a plug for Harley's YouTube channel.
| 319 | "Canadian Club Sandwich (Happy Canada Day!!)" | 40,664 | 448 | $239.75 | June 28, 2016 |
Ends with a plug for Harley's YouTube channel.
| 320 | "Mexican Burger (hamburguesa mexicana)" | 62,389 | 846 | $299.98 | July 5, 2016 |
Ends with a plug for Harley's YouTube channel.
| 321 | "Dessert Breakfast (The two most important meals of the day!)" | 18,974 | 132 | $68.32 | July 12, 2016 |
Ends with a plug for Harley's YouTube channel.
| 322 | "Sushi Donut (Changing the sushi game!!)" | 66,982 | 2,314 | $306.58 | July 19, 2016 |
Ends with a plug for Harley's YouTube channel.
| 323 | "Epic Meal Time Goes to Japan!" | - | - | - | July 26, 2016 |
The guys reminisce about their visit to Tokyo in #307, with additional behind-the-scenes footage.
| 324 | "Sauce Boss Surprise (The truth about Epic Meal Time) a.k.a. Sauce Boss CAN'T COOK!" | - | - | $70.00 | August 2, 2016 |
A comedic segment in which Harley tries and fails to cook an epic meal by himself in honor of Ameer's birthday.
| 325 | "Donut Lasagna (first lasagna of the year)" | 73,869 | 3,422 | $329.68 | August 9, 2016 |
| 326 | "Po'Daddy Sandwich (daddy of the po'boy)" | 67,475 | 998 | $34.38 | August 16, 2016 |
| 327 | "Cereal Bar (ain't nothing lucky about our charm)" | 86,456 | 3,211 | $506.20 | August 23, 2016 |
The Epic Meal Time YouTube channel adds the word "Epic" at the start of the title.
| 328 | "Spaghetti Western Omelette Sandwich Pizza Lasagna (the best sentence you will ever hear)" | 78,462 | 2,603 | $499.60 | August 30, 2016 |
| 329 | "General Tao Turkey (generally speaking we ain't about chicken)" | 56,468 | 4,751 | $214.32 | September 6, 2016 |
| 330 | "Milkshake in a Cake (the evolution of dessert)" | 81,036 | 3,041 (sugar) | $296.54 | September 13, 2016 |
| 331 | "100 Pound Brisket Sandwich (Let's start from the beginning)" | 82,567 | 1,876 | $405.31 | September 20, 2016 |
| 332 | "Epic Pizza Pocket (all your favourite foods all in one)" | 142,096 | 8,062 | $798.45 | September 27, 2016 |
| 333 | "Meat Lasagna (more meat then a farm)" | 102,756 | 3,806 | $900.50 | October 4, 2016 |
The Epic Meal Time YouTube channel adds the word "All" at the start of the title.
| 334 | "Cheesy Dorito Crumb Cake (more than enough double xp to go around)" | 219,840 | 8,232 | $1,000.24 | October 11, 2016 |
| 335 | "Overloaded Ham (Champions of the ham game)" | 48,230 | 4,203 | $138.75 | October 18, 2016 |
| 336 | "Meat Cabin In The Woods (One of the best movies of 2016 so far) -Rotten Tomatoes" | 72,532 | 3,303 | $934.26 | October 25, 2016 |
| 337 | "100 Pound Pizza Slice (The greatest slice you will ever have)" | 83,069 | 6,406 | $6,904.06 | November 1, 2016 |
| 338 | "Epic Buffet On Set (Taking care of the whole crew)" | 101,388 | 2,769 | $531.78 | November 8, 2016 |
Includes scaled down versions of "Fast Food Sushi," "Fast Food Lasagna," and "Angry French Canadian."
| 339 | "50 Pound fried chicked sandwich (800 grams of protein)" | 65,789 | 3,869 | $210.79 | November 15, 2016 |
| 340 | "3 Pigs feat. Yung Turkey (a turkey in a pig in a pig in a pig)" | 245,413 | 8,420 | $529.19 | November 22, 2016 |
The title on the Epic Meal Time YouTube channel is "What's In This Pig? (Epic Thankgsiving Recipes)".
| 341 | "100 lbs Big Mac (Inspired by true events!!)" | 192,036 | 9,236 | $1,293.50 | November 29, 2016 |
| 342 | "Big Ribwich (it's always back)" | 75,063 | 4,203 | $326.71 | December 6, 2016 |
The title on the Epic Meal Time YouTube channel is "Enough Ribs to Kill a Man".
| 343 | "Nutella Bomb (We-Tellya what's bomb!)" | 115,036 | 4,288 | $896.57 | December 13, 2016 |
| 344 | "EPIC MEAL LIVE!!!" | 6,020 | 240 | 31% of calories | December 20, 2016 |
| 345 | "Million Calorie Lasagna (The most unique lethal weapon)" | 1,014,721 | 32,362 | $5,672.93 | December 27, 2016 |
The title on the Epic Meal Time YouTube channel is "1 Million Calorie Lasagna".

== 2017 ==
Epic Meal Time episodes released in 2017

| No. | Title | Calories | Fat (grams) | Cost | Original release date |
|---|---|---|---|---|---|
| 346 | "100LB Peanut Butter and Jelly Sandwich (I don't think you're ready for this)" | 113,324 | 2,016 | $908.76 | January 3, 2017 |
| 347 | "Spicy JD Chilli (Let's eat meat and Jack Daniel's out of a bowl of bread)" | 118,365 | 4,689 | TBA | January 10, 2017 |
| 348 | "Human-Size Hot Dog (6ft Hot Dog)" | 70,534 | 589 | TBA | January 17, 2017 |
| 349 | "Boarrito (yup, it's a burrito in a boar)" | 120,558 | 1,265 | TBA | January 24, 2017 |
| 350 | "Largest Nachos Ever (over 300k calories in this bad boy)" | 399,593 | TBA | $1296.00 | January 31, 2017 |
The title on the Epic Meal Time YouTube channel is "125 lbs Super Bowl Nachos".
