= Nadia G =

Canadian chef

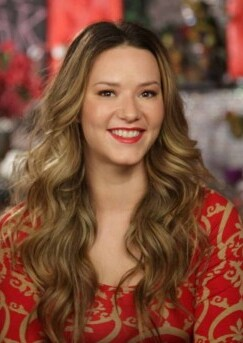
- Nadia G
- Born: Nadia Giosia; May 12, 1980 (age 46); Montreal, Quebec, Canada
- Culinary career
- Television shows
- Bite This with Nadia G; Nadia G's Bitchin' Kitchen
- Website: http://bitchinlifestyle.tv/

Nadia Giosia (born May 12, 1980), better known by the stage name Nadia G, is a Canadian musician and celebrity chef. She is known for hosting the television series Nadia G's Bitchin' Kitchen and Bite This with Nadia G, both of which aired on Food Network Canada and the Cooking Channel. Giosia also created the 2015 music festival Riot Grill and plays in a punk rock band called The Menstruators.

== Personal life ==
Giosia was born in Montreal, Quebec to a family of Italian immigrants. She grew up in St. Leonard, Quebec. Giosia has no professional training as a chef and is mostly self-taught with recipes developed from family tradition. Giosia credits her interest in fusing comedy and cooking to her upbringing, saying, "I grew up in a large Italian family where all of our best conversations happened in the kitchen. We would always be having a laugh and food would be the centerpiece."

Giosia lives in Los Angeles, California.

== Career ==
=== Television ===
==== Nadia G's Bitchin' Kitchen ====
Giosia began her entertainment career with sketch comedy in the late 1990s and early 2000s. Nadia G's Bitchin' Kitchen began as part of a comedy sketch series Giosia worked on in Montreal in 2005. The sketch evolved into a web series which was produced by Giosia and her business partner, producer and director Josh Dorsey. The YouTube web series was picked up by Food Network Canada in 2010, and then the Cooking Channel in 2011. The show ran for three seasons.

In addition to Giosia's character, the show featured Panagiotis Koussioulas as Panos the Meat and Fishmonger; Ben Shaouli as the Spice Agent Yeheskel Mizrahi; and Bart Rochon as Hans, the "scantily clad food correspondent."

==== Bite This with Nadia G ====
Bite This with Nadia G premiered in 2013 on the Cooking Channel and ran for one season. The show featured a 13-city tour of the United States where Giosia "tortured" chefs during in-kitchen interviews by looking up information from their social media so she could "hold it over their heads in the kitchen". Some of the restaurants in the series included Badmaash and Father's Office in Los Angeles, Peg Leg Porker and Hattie B's Hot Chicken in Nashville, and The Cecil in Harlem.

==== Other television appearances ====
On July 12, 2011, Giosia appeared on the American Travel Channel series Bizarre Foods with Andrew Zimmern episode "Montreal". On December 2, 2012, she appeared alongside Michael Symon and Benjamin Sargent on the "Battle Holiday Gingerbread" episode of Iron Chef America, representing the Cooking Channel against a team of Food Network stars including Masaharu Morimoto, Robert Irvine, and Ted Allen. On April 7, 2013, she appeared on season three of Chopped All-Stars. In October 2014, Giosia was one of 16 celebrity participants in Food Network's Cutthroat Kitchen Superstar Sabotage Tournament. In 2020, Giosia competed on the CW show Fridge Wars, where she competed against chef Rodney Bowers.

=== Music ===
Giosia is the lead singer of the punk riot grrrl band The Menstruators. Founded in 2013, the band features Robin Feldman on guitar, Alejandra Robles Luna on drums, and Ken Christianson on bass and vocals. The Menstruators play at dive bars around Los Angeles, including several sets at the Viper Room. In April 2016, the band made a short comedic "rockumentary" which featured commentary from Giosia, band members, and fans.

In 2015, Giosia created a female-fronted music, comedy, and food festival at the Regent Theater in downtown Los Angeles. The show was headlined by punk rock band Babes in Toyland, and featured sets from Mexican garage punk band Le Butcherettes, Los Angeles band Slutever, and Giosia's own band; the Menstruators. The event also included a stand-up comedy set by Sara Schaefer and a food menu curated by Giosia.

=== Web series ===
Giosia has also worked on a variety of web projects including Getting Irritated with Nadia G, Creep Shaming with Nadia G, and Sick Kitchens.

Getting Irritated, which began in September 2013, is a web series that features short rants by Giosia about a variety of topics. Similar to Jimmy Kimmel Live!'s Mean Tweets, the Creep Shaming series hosts celebrities who read offensive social media remarks from internet trolls. In the series, Giosia interviews guests and presents a "Golden Douchebag Award" to one commenter each episode.

Sick Kitchens is a home improvement show in which Giosa renovates kitchens. The show aired on ULive, a digital platform run by Scripps Networks Interactive. Giosa said that the show aimed to teach viewers that "bold [design] choices can be beautiful".
