= Napoleon Dynamite (soundtrack) =

Soundtrack album by Various
- Released: October 5, 2004
- Genres: Rock, new wave, disco, alternative rock
- Label: Lakeshore Records

The Napoleon Dynamite original soundtrack is the soundtrack to the 2004 comedy film, Napoleon Dynamite. It features the original score, dialogue, and other artists' songs and was released on October 5, 2004, by Lakeshore Records.

The original ending montage is not included in the soundtrack. It is "Music for a Found Harmonium" by Patrick Street, which is in turn a cover of the original song by the Penguin Cafe Orchestra.

== Track listing ==
1. "What Ever I Feel Like"
2. "I Want Candy" - Bow Wow Wow
3. "Bus Rider" - John Swihart
4. "Locker Room 1"
5. "Every Moment (live)" - Rogue Wave
6. "Pull in Town"
7. "Nap Pulls Kip Return" - John Swihart
8. "Nap Pulls Kip" - John Swihart
9. "You Do Speak English?"
10. "New Mate" - Figurine
11. "Granny ATV" - John Swihart
12. "Cagefighter"
13. "A-Team Theme" - John Swihart
14. "Here's Rico" - John Swihart
15. "Summer's Cake" - John Swihart
16. "Vote for Me"
17. "Design" - Fiction Company
18. "Locker Room 2"
19. "Sometimes You Gotta Make It Alone" - Money Mark
20. "Worst Video"
21. "Thrifty" - John Swihart
22. "Suit"
23. "Suitwalk" - John Swihart
24. "Talons"
25. "Kip Waits" - John Swihart
26. "Chapstick"
27. "Solamente Una Vez" - Trío Los Panchos
28. "Loch Ness"
29. "Nap Store Video" - John Swihart
30. "A Skit by Pedro"
31. "Canned Heat" - Jamiroquai
32. "D-Qwan Boogie" - John Swihart
33. "Nap Dance Bedroom" - John Swihart
34. "Whole Milk"
35. "Only You" - Yaz
36. "Nap Rico Van" - John Swihart
37. "Nap Hangs Up the Phone" - John Swihart
38. "Forever Young" - Alphaville
39. "Time After Time" - Cyndi Lauper
40. "Ninja Moves"
41. "Alternate Ending Montage" - John Swihart
42. "The Promise" - When in Rome

== Other songs ==
These songs appeared in the movie, but are not included on the commercially released soundtrack.

1. "We're Going to Be Friends" - The White Stripes
2. "Larger Than Life" - Backstreet Boys
3. "The Rose" - Darci Monet
4. "More Bounce to the Ounce" - Zapp and Roger
5. "So Ruff, So Tuff" - Roger Troutman
6. "Music for a Found Harmonium" by Simon Jeffes (covered by Patrick Street)*
