= Masanori Mark Christianson =

- Also known as: Masanori Mark Christianson
- Born: Masanori Hakuta Shirota; January 18, 1976 (age 50); Tokyo, Japan
- Genres: Alternative rock Indie rock Punk rock Rock
- Occupations: Creative Director, Musician, Songwriter, Visual Artist
- Instruments: Bass guitar, Drums, Glockenspiel, Guitar, Keyboards, Organ, Piano, Synthesizer, Tambourine, Violin, Vocals
- Years active: 1990–present
- Labels: Bodycast Records; Brushfire Records; Easy Sound Recording Company; Hippies Are Dead Records; The Rebel Group; Vagrant Records

Masanori Mark Christianson (born Masanori Hakuta Shirota, January 18, 1976 in Tokyo, Japan) is a Japanese-Korean-American musician, creative director, and visual artist. He may be best known as a bass guitarist and multi-instrumentalist for the Oakland, California indie rock bands Rogue Wave, The Heavenly States, and Release The Sunbird.

Masanori, also an advertising art director, designer, and copywriter, has worked for clients ranging from the Target Corporation to the Tiger Woods Foundation.

Although not a serious venture, Masanori occasionally dabbles in modeling, voice-over and extra work for corporations such as UnitedHealth Group and the Investigation Discovery Channel.

Masanori is the older sibling of Los Angeles based musician and composer Ken Christianson. He is an alumnus of Carleton College.
