= Permalight =

Studio album by Rogue Wave
- Released: March 2, 2010
- Recorded: April–September 2009; Oxford, Mississippi
- Genre: Indie rock, electronica
- Length: 36:38
- Label: Brushfire
- Producer: Dennis Herring, Paul Thomas

Rogue Wave chronology
Asleep at Heaven's Gate (2007)	Permalight (2010)	Nightingale Floors (2013)

Singles from Permalight
- 1. "Good Morning (The Future)" Released: January 25, 2010; 2. "Solitary Gun" Released: May 31, 2010

Permalight is the fourth album by indie rock band Rogue Wave. It is the first to feature new bassist Cameron Jasper. The album was released on March 2, 2010.

Professional ratings
Review scores
Source	Rating
Allmusic	3.5/5 stars
Pitchfork Media	(5.1/10)
Spin	3/5 stars
The A.V. Club	(B+)

All tracks are written by Zach Rogue

Track list
No.	Title	Length
1.	"Solitary Gun"	3:42
2.	"Good Morning (The Future)"	4:07
3.	"Sleepwalker"	3:43
4.	"Stars and Stripes"	3:07
5.	"Permalight"	3:05
6.	"Fear Itself"	4:24
7.	"Right With You"	3:13
8.	"We Will Make A Song Destroy"	3:53
9.	"I'll Never Leave You"	2:57
10.	"Per Anger"	2:35
11.	"You Have Boarded"	2:54
12.	"All That Remains"	1:05
