= Nadia G's Bitchin' Kitchen =

Canadian cooking show

- Also known as: Bitchin' Kitchen
- Genre: Cooking show; Food reality television
- Presented by: Nadia G
- Starring: Peter Koussioulas; Ben Shaouli; Bart Rochon
- Country of origin: Canada
- No. of seasons: 3
- No. of episodes: 47

Production
- Producers: B360 Media; Tricon Films
- Running time: 22:00

Original release
- Network: Cooking Channel; Food Network Canada
- Release: April 2, 2010 – May 1, 2013

Nadia G's Bitchin' Kitchen was a Canadian cooking show that began airing simultaneously on Food Network Canada in Canada and Cooking Channel in the United States on April 2, 2010; after originating as a web series in 2007. It was presented by chef and musician Nadia G.

Ali Rosen of The Daily Meal described the series as "a continuation of [Nadia G's] web series", which Nadia G confirmed: "I could create cool aprons, I could dish out recipes, I could do the comedy, music videos, so we've always had a lot of freedom in Bitchin' Kitchen and that has continued."

Bitchin' Kitchen concluded on January 5, 2013, after three seasons. The correspondents on the series would all later appear on Nadia G's subsequent series, Bite This with Nadia G.

== Cast ==
- Nadia G – Herself
- Peter Koussioulas – Panos
- Jordan Lu – Taste Tester
- Ben Shaouli – Yeheskel Mizrahi, the Spice Agent
- Bart Rochon – Hans
