= List of programs broadcast by Cooking Channel =

This is a list of television programs that have been broadcast by American television network Cooking Channel.

Title	Presenter(s)	Year(s)	Ref(s)
Beach Bites with Katie Lee	Katie Lee	2015–2018	
Bite This with Nadia G	Nadia G	2013–2014	
Carnival Eats	Noah Cappe	2014–	
Cheap Eats	Ali Khan	2015–2018	
Dinner at Tiffani's	Tiffani Thiessen	2015–2017	
Donut Showdown	Danny Boome (2013–2014); Daryn Jones (2014)	2013–2014	
Eat St.	James Cunningham	2011–2015	
Extra Virgin	Gabriele Corcos; Debi Mazar	2011–2016	
Extra Virgin Americana	Gabriele Corcos; Debi Mazar	2016–2017	
The Fabulous Beekman Boys	Brent Ridge; Josh Kilmer-Purcell	2010–2011	
Fire Masters	Dylan Benoit	2019–2022	
Food: Fact or Fiction?	Michael McKean	2015–2019	
Freakshow Cakes	Zac Young; Vivian Chan	2019–	
French Food at Home	Laura Calder	2007–2010	
Junk Food Flip	Bobby Deen; Nikki Dinki	2014–2016	
Kelsey's Essentials	Kelsey Nixon	2010–2016	
Kelsey's Homemade	Kelsey Nixon	2015	
Man Fire Food	Roger Mooking	2012–2020	
Man v. Food	Casey Webb	2019–2022	
Nadia G's Bitchin' Kitchen	Nadia G	2010–2013	
Not My Mama's Meals	Bobby Deen	2012–2013	
Pizza Cuz	Sal Basille; Francis Garcia	2013	
Pizza Masters	Sal Basille; Francis Garcia	2014–	
The Real Girl's Kitchen	Haylie Duff	2014–2015	
Sinful Sweets	Harry Eastwood	2015	
Spice Goddess	Bal Arneson	2010–2012	
Taco Trip	Aarón Sanchez	2014–2015	
Tia Mowry at Home	Tia Mowry	2015–	
Unique Eats	Various	2010–2013	
Unique Sweets	Various	2011–2014	
Unwrapped 2.0	Alfonso Ribeiro	2015–2017	
Yum and Yummer	Eddie Jackson	2019–2021	
