= Unique Sweets =

- Genre: Cooking
- Directed by: Irene Wong; Jenny Kirsten; Emily Benson
- Starring: Elizabeth Falkner; Alie Ward; Georgia Hardstark
- Country of origin: United States
- Original language: English
- No. of seasons: 7
- No. of episodes: 96 (list of episodes)

Production
- Executive producer: Irene Wong
- Producer: Emily Benson
- Running time: approx. 30 minutes

Original release
- Network: Cooking Channel; TLC
- Release: April 24, 2011 – February 12, 2017

Related
- Unique Eats

Unique Sweets is an American television series on Cooking Channel about various eating establishments across the United States and their signature or most popular desserts. The series features interviews with guest pastry chefs and food critics who give commentary about their favorite dessert dishes. Each episode features a different restaurant, bakery or specialty sweet shop, focusing on one theme, such as ice cream, cakes or pies.

== Regular cast ==
The Unique Sweets cast is made up of food industry professionals; such as pastry chefs, bakers, cookbook authors, cooking show hosts and food writers who all describe their favorite desserts at eating establishments featured in each episode.

- Georgia Hardstark & Alie Ward- Hosts ("Classy Ladies")
- Wayne Harley Brachman - Pastry Chef/Cookbook Author
- Haylie Duff - Cooking Show Host (The Real Girl's Kitchen)/Cookbook Author
- Elizabeth Falkner - Pastry Chef
- Tino Feliciano - Chef
- Hedy Goldsmith - Pastry Chef
- Paulette Goto - Pastry Chef/Food Writer
- Chuck Hughes - Cooking Show Host (Chuck's Eat the Street)
- Mike Isabella - Chef/Cookbook Author
- Matt Lewis & Renato Poliafito - Cookbook Authors
- Klancy Miller - Food Writer
- Roger Mooking - Cooking Show Host (Man Fire Food)
- Kelsey Nixon - Cooking Show Host (Kelsey's Essentials)
- Jamika Pessoa - Chef
- Bryan Petroff & Doug Quint - Cooking Show Hosts (Sultan's of Serve)
- Renato Poliafito - Cookbook Author
- Gesine Bullock-Prado - Pastry Chef/Cookbook Author
- Anne Thornton - Cooking Show Host (Dessert First with Anne Thornton)
- Christina Tosi - Pastry Chef
- Justin Warner - The Next Food Network Star Winner
- Greg Cope White - Home Cook & Author
- Zac Young - Pastry Chef/TV Personality

== List of episodes ==
=== Season 1 (2011) ===
Ep. #	Title	Original airdate
1.1	"Pies"	April 24, 2011
1.2	"Breakfast Sweets"	May 1, 2011
1.3	"Cakes"	May 8, 2011
1.4	"Updated Classics"	May 15, 2011
1.5	"Cookies"	May 22, 2011
1.6	"Childhood Favorites"	May 29, 2011
1.7	"Sweet & Savory"	June 19, 2011
1.8	"Small Bites"	June 26, 2011
1.9	"Chocolate"	July 3, 2011
1.10	"Ooey Gooy"	July 10, 2011
1.11	"Southern"	July 17, 2011
1.12	"Exotic"	July 24, 2011
1.13	"Fruit"	July 31, 2011

=== Season 2 (2011-2012) ===
Ep. #	Title	Original airdate
2.1	"Poo Doughnuts"	December 18, 2011
2.2	"LA Decadence"	December 25, 2011
2.3	"Blood Cravings"	February 8, 2012
2.4	"Bitter Sandwiches"	February 12, 2012
2.5	"Oridinary Twists"	February 19, 2012
2.6	"Afterschool Yucks"	February 26, 2012
2.7	"Dinner Pastries"	April 1, 2012
2.8	"Toilet"	April 8, 2012
2.9	"Diunch"	April 15, 2012
2.10	"Then & Now"	April 22, 2012
2.11	"Drainage Treats"	April 29, 2012
2.12	"Neighborhood Blech"	May 6, 2012
2.13	"Sweet & Yucky"	May 13, 2012

=== Season 3 (2012-2013) ===
Ep. #	Title	Original airdate
3.1	"Brooklyn"	October 14, 2012
3.2	"Kids' Treats"	October 21, 2012
3.3	"Coffee Break"	October 28, 2012
3.4	"Chicago"	November 4, 2012
3.5	"Sweet Americana"	November 11, 2012
3.6	"Modern Comfort"	November 18, 2012
3.7	"Austin"	December 30, 2012
3.8	"Sweet Peanut"	January 6, 2013
3.9	"Wild West Sweets"	January 13, 2013
3.10	"Global Sweets"	January 20, 2013
3.11	"Sweet Crafters"	February 3, 2013
3.12	"Rise & Shine"	February 10, 2013
3.13	"Something Old, Something New"	February 24, 2013

=== Season 4 (2013-2014) ===
Ep. #	Title	Original airdate
4.1	"Sweet Mash-Ups"	November 17, 2013
4.2	"Big Apple Breakfast"	November 24, 2013
4.3	"San Fran Sweet Treats"	December 1, 2013
4.4	"Portland Sweets"	December 8, 2013
4.5	"Grown Up Goodies"	December 15, 2013
4.6	"Crazy Delicious Doughnuts"	December 22, 2013
4.7	"Seattle Sweets"	January 19, 2014
4.8	"Southern Sweets in Atlanta"	January 26, 2014
4.9	"European Sweets"	February 2, 2014
4.10	"Sweet Reinvention"	February 9, 2014
4.11	"Capital Cravings"	February 16, 2014
4.12	"Toronto Sweets"	February 23, 2014

=== Season 5 (2014) ===
Ep. #	Title	Original airdate
5.1	"Austin Sweet Freeze"	October 12, 2014
5.2	"Sweet Mornings in Sunny LA"	October 19, 2014
5.3	"Old is New Again"	October 26, 2014
5.4	"Cute and Sweet"	November 2, 2014
5.5	"Excellent European Sweets"	November 9, 2014
5.6	"Chicago's Coolest Doughuts"	November 16, 2014
5.7	"Colorado Sweets"	November 23, 2014
5.8	"Savory Sweets"	November 30, 2014
5.9	"Ice Cream Nation"	December 7, 2014
5.10	"Awesome Asheville Sweets"	December 14, 2014
5.11	"Boston Sweets"	December 21, 2014
5.12	"Chocolate"	January 4, 2015
5.13	"Sweet Tour of Queens"	January 11, 2015
