= Chuck Hughes (chef) =

French-Canadian chef, television personality and restaurateur

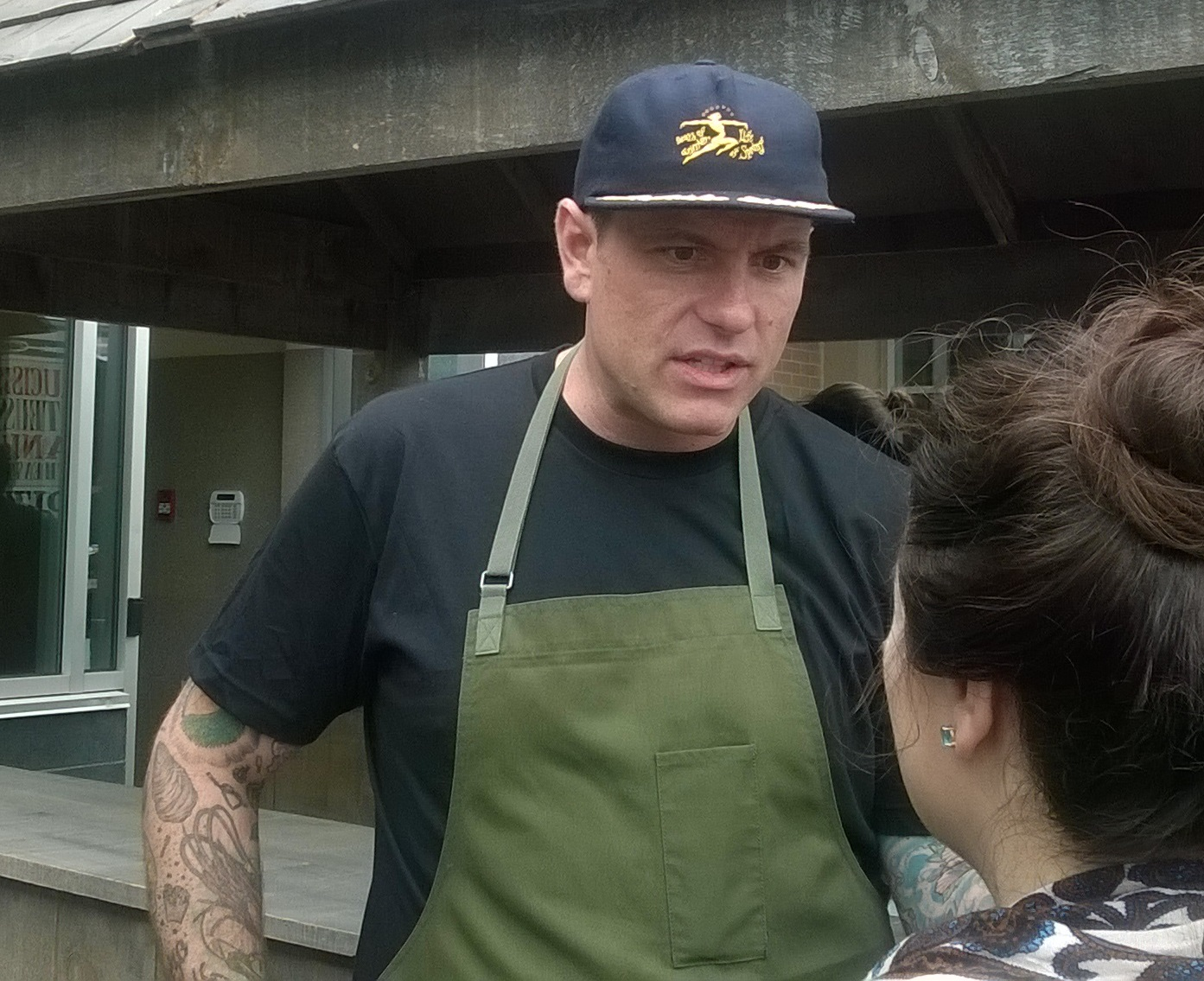
- Born: December 31, 1976 (age 49); Montreal, Quebec, Canada
- Culinary career
- Current restaurant
- Garde Manger
- Television shows
- Chuck's Day Off, Chuck's Week Off: Mexico, Chuckmas, Chuck's Eat The Street, Chopped: Canada, À couteaux tirés, Chuck and the First Peoples’ Kitchen

Chuck Hughes (born December 31, 1976) is a Canadian chef, television personality, and restaurateur. He is the chef and co-owner of Garde Manger with partners Tim Rozon and Kyle Marshall Nares. Hughes fluently speaks both English and French.

== Biography ==
He became a celebrity chef as the host of the English-language cooking series Chuck's Day Off on the Food Network in Canada and on Cooking Channel in the United States. Since then, he has hosted a travel and cooking show called Chuck's Week Off: Mexico, and Chuck's Eat The Street, where he explores foods along a street in cities around the United States.

Hughes competed on the American cooking show Iron Chef America, defeating Iron Chef Bobby Flay, becoming the youngest Canadian chef to win, and only the third to do so. He was a competitor on Food Network's The Next Iron Chef: Super Chefs competition.

In 2014, Hughes was a recurring judge on season one of Chopped Canada. He is also the co-host of Casa's À couteaux tirés, a French-language cooking competition show, based somewhat on the American series Knife Fight.

In 2021, Le Bremner, his restaurant in Old Montreal, closed.

== Filmography ==
Television
Year	Title	Role	Notes
2006	Ace of Cakes	Himself	Season 1 episode 5: "Duff Goes Hollywood"
2009–2011	Chuck's Day Off	Himself/host	
2010	The Best Thing I Ever Ate	Himself	Season 4 episode 5 and 6: "Under Wraps" and "Cake Walk"
2010–2012	Unique Eats	Himself	25 episodes
2011	Iron Chef America	Himself	Season 9 episode 2: "Flay vs. Hughes: Battle Canadian Lobster"
2011	Chuck's Week Off	Himself	
2011	Chefography	Himself	Season 7 episode 1: "Chuck Hughes"
2011	Secrets of Montréal: Cultural Gems	Himself	
2011	The Next Iron Chef	Himself	Contestant; Season 4: "Super Chefs"
2011–2012	The Perfect 3	Himself	Season 1 episodes: 9 and 12: "Potato" and "Pies"; Season 2 episode 18: "Fish"
2011–2014	Top Chef Canada	Himself	Guest judge Season 1 episode 6: "The French Feast"; Season 3 episode 1: "My First Dish"; Season 4 episode 8: "School's Out for the Chefs"
2012–2014	Chuck's Eat the Street	Himself/host	
2013	Chopped	Himself	Competitor; Season 15 episode 4: "Chopped All-Stars: Mega Chefs"
2013	Food Network's 20th Birthday Party	Himself	
2014	Chopped Canada	Himself	Recurring judge on season 1
2014	À couteaux tirés!	Himself	
2015	Man Fire Food	Himself	Season 4 episode 13: "Puerto Rican Grilling"
2017	Chuck & Danny's Road Trip	Himself	
2020	Chuck et la Cuisine des Premiers Peuples	Himself/host	
