= Harry Eastwood =

British chef

- Born: Harriet Eastwood; London
- Education: University of St. Andrews, MA English and philosophy Cordon Bleu Diploma from Tante Marie
- Culinary career
- Cooking style: French; Vegetable Cakes
- Television shows: Cook Yourself Thin, Channel 4 Cook Yourself Thin USA, Lifetime Network; Baking Good, Baking Bad, Fox; Sinful Sweets, Cooking Channel USA; Sugar Showdown , Cooking Channel USA
- Website: https://www.penguin.co.uk/authors/harry-eastwood/1062483/

Harriet "Harry" Eastwood is a British chef and cookbook author living in Paris. She co-hosted the Channel 4 cooking-themed television series Cook Yourself Thin in 2007; She went on to present the US version of the show and co-wrote the accompanying cookbook, which later became The New York Times bestseller.

Eastwood has since written four more cookery books, Red Velvet & Chocolate Heartache – which has sold more than 42,000 copies, The Skinny French Kitchen – which was nominated for the prestigious Guild of Food Writers Miriam Poulnin Award for Healthy Eating, and A Salad for All Seasons. Her latest book, Carneval: A celebration of meat in recipes, was published by Transworld Publishers on 8 September 2016.

Having once been a vegetarian, Eastwood then spent 15 years researching meat in all its aspects. Her passion for butchery and all meat matters even took her to Smithfield Market where she moonlit as an apprentice butcher in her early twenties. She now bases her cooking style to paying homage to the origins of meat as well as being aware of the environmental implications of eating it.

Eastword's most recent TV series have included Fox's Baking Good, Baking Bad and Sinful Sweets, which aired on Cooking Channel USA. She is also a frequent judge on Donut Showdown and Sugar Showdown.

== Bibliography ==
Year	Title	Publisher	ISBN
2007	Cook Yourself Thin: The Delicious Way to Drop a Size (co-written by Sophie Michell and Gizzi Erskine)	Penguin UK	9780718153519
2009	Red Velvet & Chocolate Heartache	Transworld	9780593062364
2011	The Skinny French Kitchen	Transworld	9780593066461
2013	A Salad for All Seasons	Transworld	9780593069943
2016	Carneval: A celebration of meat, in recipes	Transworld	9780593069950
