= Shane Lyons =

American actor, chef, and restaurateur (born 1980s)

- Born: 1988/1989 (age 37–38); Colorado Springs, Colorado, US
- Education: Culinary Institute of America at Hyde Park (2007)
- Occupations: Actor; chef; consultant; restaurateur
- Employer: Nickelodeon
- Television: All That
- Culinary career
- Current restaurant: Distilled New York
- Previous restaurants: Café Boulud; Momofuku

Shane Lyons (born 1988/1989) is an American chef, consultant, restaurateur, and former child actor from Colorado.

== Personal life ==
Shane Lyons was born in Colorado Springs, Colorado, in 1988 or 1989. His parents were both chefs, and he graduated from The Culinary Institute of America at Hyde Park in 2007.

== Career ==
=== Media ===
Before he was a teen, Lyons performed in a local film that was accepted at the Sundance Film Festival. At twelve years old, he landed a part in Nickelodeon's sketch comedy show, All That; he didn't leave the show until he was 16 years old. He portrayed Jeremy Brice in a season-four episode of Law & Order: Special Victims Unit: "Juvenile" (November 22, 2002).

After All That he took a break from acting because he grew tired of the auditioning process. As an adult, he was a contestant on season four of The Next Food Network Star. In 2024, he was scheduled to appear in the fifth episode of the docuseries, Quiet on Set: The Dark Side of Kids TV.

=== Cooking ===
Lyons credits a fifth birthday gift for his love of cooking: his parents gave him a chef's knife. In 2010, Lyons was working as a chef in Colorado Springs. From 2010–2020, he trained in New York City with Daniel Boulud (at Café Boulud) and David Chang (at Momofuku Noodle Bar) before opening his own fine–casual pub, Distilled New York. By 2020, he was working as a chef consultant.
