= Simply Laura =

- Genre: Cooking
- Presented by: Laura Vitale
- Country of origin: United States
- Original language: English
- No. of seasons: 2
- No. of episodes: 14

Production
- Producer: Rock Shrimp Productions

Original release
- Release: September 27, 2014 – April 23, 2016

Simply Laura is an American television series on the Cooking Channel starring Laura Vitale.

== Episodes ==
=== Season 1 ===
№	#	Title	Original airdate
1	1.1	"Lessons from Nonna"	September 27, 2014
2	1.2	"Super Simple Suppers"	October 4, 2014
3	1.3	"Papa's Pizza"	October 11, 2014
4	1.4	"Laura's Leftovers"	October 18, 2014
5	1.5	"Sweet & Savory Brunch"	October 25, 2014
6	1.6	"Family Style"	November 1, 2014

=== Season 2 ===
№	#	Title	Original airdate
7	2.1	"Date Night"	March 5, 2016
8	2.2	"15-Minute Meals"	March 12, 2016
9	2.3	"Family Game Night"	March 19, 2016
10	2.4	"Italian Girl in the Garden State"	March 26, 2016
11	2.5	"The Little Black Dress Ingredient"	April 2, 2016
12	2.6	"One-Pot Meals"	April 9, 2016
13	2.7	"All Day Breakfast"	April 16, 2016
14	2.8	"Girls' Day and Night!"	April 23, 2016
