= Tom Mylan =

American butcher

- Born: April 26, 1976 (age 50); Southern California, California, U.S.
- Occupations: Butcher, educator, writer, and author
- Movement: Local, sustainably raised meat
- Spouse: Annaliese Griffin

Tom Mylan (born April 26, 1976) is an American butcher, educator, writer, and author, specializing in local, sustainably raised meat. He was the executive butcher and co-owner of "The Meat Hook" from 2009 until 2015, a butcher shop in Williamsburg, Brooklyn. Mylan has been responsible for several community oriented-food projects, including co-founding the "Unfancy Food Show", an annual, affordable event featuring local, artisanal food producers, which celebrates Brooklyn's return to hand-crafted, environmentally aware food ways.

== Biography ==
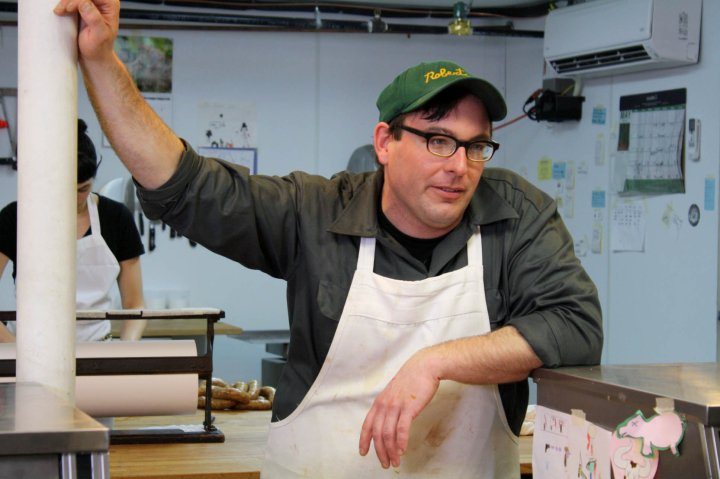
Mylan leaning on the counter at his butcher shop, The Meat Hook, in Williamsburg, Brooklyn

Tom Mylan was born in Southern California. He was raised in Reno, Nevada; at age 12 his family moved to Orange County, California. In his 20s, he was a vegetarian and moved to San Francisco for three years.

In 2003, Mylan moved to New York City, where he started out working at Murray's Cheese Shop. By 2005 he was worked at Andrew Tarlow and Mark Firth's Marlow & Sons cafe in New York, as a buyer and manager. In 2007, the meat supplier Fleisher's for Marlow & Sons, and their sister-restaurant Diner, decided they would reduce the quantity of meat they would sell to small businesses. Marlow & Sons needed to find an in-house butcher, but they struggled to hire someone. Mylan agreed to learn butchering from Fleisher's at the Applestone Meat Company in Upstate New York.

From 2009 until 2015, he was the executive butcher and co-owner of The Meat Hook, a butcher shop in Williamsburg, Brooklyn, where they cut, smoke and cure meat that is sourced from small, family-owned farms. His co-founders and partners at The Meat Hook included Brent Young and Ben Turley.

In 2010, Mylan was named one of The New York Observer's "Insurgents of 2010," as well as one of the Chow 13, the Chow website's annual list of the most influential people in the U.S. food world.

Mylan has a forthcoming book, The Meat Hook Meat Book, and recently published an iPad application, The Better Bacon Book with Open Air Publishing and Ari Weinzweig of Zingerman's Deli in Ann Arbor.

Mylan has been featured on the Travel Channel's No Reservations with Anthony Bourdain, the Cooking Channel's FoodCrafters, NPR's All things Considered, and The Brian Lehrer Show. In addition he has appeared as a guest lecturer at Yale University. He has written for New York Magazine, Gourmet.com, and he currently writes a column for the Atlantic Magazine Food Channel.

He lives in Brooklyn, with his wife, Annaliese Griffin, the editor and co-owner of "Brooklyn Based".
