= Will Work for Food =

Will Work for Food may refer to:

- A common phrase on panhandlers' signs.

It may also refer to these following works of art and organizations.

- Will Work for Food, 1993 album by Uncle Slam
- Will Work for Food (TV series), the Food Network television series starring Adam Gertler
- Will Work for Food (organization), web-based non-profit addressing severe malnutrition
