= Rock Shrimp Productions =

American media company

- Type: Private
- Industry: Television production; Mass media
- Founded: 2005; 21 years ago
- Headquarters: New York, New York, United States
- Key people: Bobby Flay (executive producer); Kim Martin (executive producer)
- Website: rockshrimp.tv

Rock Shrimp Productions NY, LLC is an independent television production company, with headquarters in New York City. The company was founded in 2005 by Kim Martin and chef Bobby Flay, who serve as executive producers. Rock Shrimp Productions also operates Bread & Butter Post, an in-house post-production company.

== List of programs ==
Title	Channel(s)	Year(s)	Ref(s)
3 Days to Open with Bobby Flay	Food Network	2012	
5 Ingredient Fix	Food Network	2009–2011	
Alex's Day Off	Food Network	2009–2011	
All In: The Road to the Classic	NBCSN / TVG	2018–2019	
BBQ Brawl	Food Network	2019–present	
Beat Bobby Flay	Food Network	2013–present	
The Bobby and Damaris Show	Food Network	2017	
Bobby Flay Fit	Food Network	2013–2014	
Bobby Flay's Barbecue Addiction	Food Network	2011–2014	
Bobby's Dinner Battle	Cooking Channel	2013	
Boss Nails	Oxygen	2015	
Boy Meets Grill	Food Network	2002–2011	
Brunch @ Bobby's	Cooking Channel / Food Network	2010–2017	
Dear Food Network	Food Network	2008–2010	
The Flay List	Food Network	2019–present	
Flipping Exes	Bravo	2019–present	
Grill It! with Bobby Flay	Food Network	2008–2010	
Kelsey's Essentials	Cooking Channel	2010–2016	
Kelsey's Homemade	Cooking Channel	2015	
Mexican Made Easy	Food Network	2010–2012	
Sandwich King	Food Network	2011–2014	
Simply Laura	Cooking Channel	2014–2016	
Throwdown! with Bobby Flay	Food Network	2006–2010	
