= List of Kelsey's Essentials episodes =

The American cooking television series Kelsey's Essentials aired on Cooking Channel from 2010 to 2016. A total of 69 episodes of the series aired over six seasons.

== Episodes ==
Season	Episodes	Originally released	
Season	Episodes	First released	Last released
1	13	November 6, 2010	February 5, 2011
2	13	June 25, 2011	November 26, 2011
3	13	February 4, 2012	April 28, 2012
4	13	October 6, 2012	January 19, 2013
5	13	July 3, 2013	September 25, 2013
6	4	December 7, 2016	December 14, 2016

=== Season 1 (2010–2011) ===
No.	Title	Original air date
1	"Fresh Pasta"	November 6, 2010
2	"Roasting"	November 13, 2010
3	"Easy as Pie"	November 20, 2010
4	"Quick Breads"	November 27, 2010
5	"Entertaining" (Note: "Entertaining" was produced as the seventh episode of the first season, but it aired as the fifth episode of the season.)	December 4, 2010
6	"Sauces" (Note: "Sauces" was produced as the eighth episode of the first season and "Eggs" was produced as the sixth episode of the season, but the episodes aired in reverse order.)	December 11, 2010
7	"Food Gifts" (Note: "Food Gifts" was produced as the thirteenth episode of the first season, but it aired as the seventh episode of the season.)	December 18, 2010
8	"Eggs"	January 1, 2011
9	"Fall Pantry"	January 8, 2011
10	"Kelsey's Favorites"	January 15, 2011
11	"Knife Skills" (Note: "Knife Skills" was produced as the fifth episode of the first season, but it aired as the eleventh episode of the season.)	January 22, 2011
12	"Stews"	January 29, 2011
13	"Cast Iron Skillet"	February 5, 2011 (Note: "Cast Iron Skillet" was produced as the eleventh episode of the first season, but it aired as the thirteenth episode of the season.)

=== Season 2 (2011) ===
No.	Title	Original air date
1	"Summer Desserts" (Note: "Summer Desserts" was produced as the second episode of the second season and "Super Sandwiches" was produced as the sixth episode of the season, but the episodes aired in reverse order.)	June 25, 2011
2	"Super Sandwiches"	July 2, 2011
3	"Easy Summer Cooking" (Note: "Easy Summer Cooking" was produced as the tenth episode of the second season, but it aired as the third episode of the season.)	July 9, 2011
4	"Classic Steak with a Twist" (Note: "Classic Steak with a Twist" was produced as the seventh episode of the second season, but it aired as the fourth episode of the season.)	July 16, 2011
5	"Heavenly Herbs"	July 23, 2011
6	"Veggie Bliss" (Note: "Veggie Bliss" was produced as the third episode of the second season, but it aired as the sixth episode of the season.)	July 30, 2011
7	"Rise and Shine" (Note: "Rise and Shine" was produced as the ninth episode of the second season, but it aired as the seventh episode of the season.)	August 6, 2011
8	"Pizza and Flatbreads" (Note: "Pizza and Flatbreads" was produced as the thirteenth episode of the second season, but it aired as the eighth episode of the season.)	August 13, 2011
9	"My Trip to Spain" (Note: "My Trip to Spain" was produced as the second episode of the second season, but it aired as the ninth episode of the season.)	August 20, 2011
10	"Backyard Feast with Friends" (Note: "Backyard Feast with Friends" was produced as the eleventh episode of the second season, but it aired as the tenth episode of the season.)	August 27, 2011
11	"Indoor BBQ" (Note: "Indoor BBQ" was produced as the sixth episode of the second season, but it aired as the eleventh episode of the season.)	September 3, 2011
12	"Small Plate Party" (Note: "Small Plate Party" was produced as the fourth episode of the second season, but it aired as the twelfth episode of the season.)	September 10, 2011
13	"Hooray for the Holidays" (Note: "Hooray for the Holidays" was produced as the twelfth episode of the second season, but it aired as the thirteenth episode of the season.)	November 26, 2011

=== Season 3 (2012) ===
No.	Title	Original air date
1	"Butchering" (Note: "Butchering" was produced as the third episode of the third season, but it aired as the first episode of the season.)	February 4, 2012
2	"Chocolate" (Note: "Chocolate" was produced as the tenth episode of the third season, but it aired as the second episode of the season.)	February 11, 2012
3	"Seafood" (Note: "Seafood" was produced as the sixth episode of the third season, but it aired as the third episode of the season.)	February 18, 2012
4	"Sunday Dinner" (Note: "Sunday Dinner" was produced as the thirteenth episode of the third season, but it aired as the fourth episode of the season.)	February 25, 2012
5	"Burgers" (Note: "Burgers" was produced as the ninth episode of the third season, but it aired as the fifth episode of the season.)	March 3, 2012
6	"Take Out" (Note: "Take Out" was produced as the first episode of the third season, but it aired as the sixth episode of the season.)	March 10, 2012
7	"Cheese" (Note: "Cheese" was produced as the fourth episode of the third season, but it aired as the seventh episode of the season.)	March 17, 2012
8	"Urban Farming" (Note: "Urban Farming" was produced as the seventh episode of the third season, but it aired as the eighth episode of the season.)	March 24, 2012
9	"My Trip to France" (Note: "My Trip to France" was produced as the twelfth episode of the third season, but it aired as the ninth episode of the season.)	March 31, 2012
10	"On the Go" (Note: "On the Go" was produced as the eleventh episode of the third season, but it aired as the tenth episode of the season.)	April 7, 2012
11	"Sweet Treats" (Note: "Sweet Treats" was produced as the second episode of the third season, but it aired as the eleventh episode of the season.)	April 14, 2012
12	"Restaurant Inspiration" (Note: "Restaurant Inspiration" was produced as the eighth episode of the third season, but it aired as the twelfth episode of the season.)	April 21, 2012
13	"Pickling Class" (Note: "Pickling Class" was produced as the fifth episode of the third season, but it aired as the thirteenth episode of the season.)	April 28, 2012

=== Season 4 (2012–2013) ===
No.	Title	Original air date
1	"On the Go Grilling" (Note: "On the Go Grilling" was produced as the sixth episode of the fourth season, but it aired as the first episode of the season.)	October 6, 2012
2	"Junk Food Essentials" (Note: "Junk Food Essentials" was produced as the first episode of the fourth season, but it aired as the second episode of the season.)	October 13, 2012
3	"Lean and Mean" (Note: "Lean and Mean" was produced as the fifth episode of the fourth season, but it aired as the third episode of the season.)	October 20, 2012
4	"Unexpected Desserts" (Note: "Unexpected Desserts" was produced as the eleventh episode of the fourth season and "My Trip to Italy" was produced as the fourth episode of the season, but the episodes aired in reverse order.)	October 27, 2012
5	"Game Day Gourmet" (Note: "Game Day Gourmet" was produced as the eighth episode of the fourth season, but it aired as the fifth episode of the season.)	November 3, 2012
6	"Mock Thanksgiving" (Note: "Mock Thanksgiving" was produced as the second episode of the fourth season, but it aired as the sixth episode of the season.)	November 10, 2012
7	"Tacos" (Note: "Tacos" was produced as the tenth episode of the fourth season, but it aired as the seventh episode of the season.)	November 17, 2012
8	"Honey" (Note: "Honey" was produced as the seventh episode of the fourth season, but it aired as the eighth episode of the season.)	November 24, 2012
9	"BBQ"	December 1, 2012
10	"New N.Y. Favorite" (Note: "New N.Y. Favorite" was produced as the third episode of the fourth season, but it aired as the tenth episode of the season.)	December 22, 2012
11	"My Trip to Italy"	December 29, 2012
12	"Mexican"	January 12, 2013
13	"Pork Four Ways"	January 19, 2013

=== Season 5 (2013) ===
No.	Title	Original air date
1	"Fiery Foods" (Note: "Fiery Foods" was produced as the ninth episode of the fifth season, but it aired as the first episode of the season.)	July 3, 2013
2	"A Salt of the Senses" (Note: "A Salt of the Senses" was produced as the twelfth episode of the fifth season, but it aired as the second episode of the season.)	July 10, 2013
3	"Hot and Cool Desserts" (Note: "Hot and Cool Desserts" was produced as the tenth episode of the fifth season, but it aired as the third episode of the season.)	July 17, 2013
4	"After Hour Eats" (Note: "After Hour Eats" was produced as the first episode of the fifth season, but it aired as the fourth episode of the season.)	July 24, 2013
5	"Happiest Hour" (Note: "Happiest Hour" was produced as the fourth episode of the fifth season, but it aired as the fifth episode of the season.)	July 31, 2013
6	"Snack Attack" (Note: "Snack Attack" was produced as the fifth episode of the fifth season, but it aired as the sixth episode of the season.)	August 7, 2013
7	"The Big First" (Note: "The Big First" was produced as the thirteenth episode of the fifth season, but it aired as the seventh episode of the season.)	August 14, 2013
8	"Jamaican" (Note: "Jamaican" was produced as the sixth episode of the fifth season, but it aired as the eighth episode of the season.)	August 21, 2013
9	"Amazing Mashups" (Note: "Amazing Mashups" was produced as the seventh episode of the fifth season, but it aired as the ninth episode of the season.)	August 28, 2013
10	"Dinner and a Movie" (Note: "Dinner and a Movie" was produced as the eleventh episode of the fifth season, but it aired as the tenth episode of the season.)	September 4, 2013
11	"Straight out of Tokyo" (Note: "Straight out of Tokyo" was produced as the third episode of the fifth season, but it aired as the eleventh episode of the season.)	September 11, 2013
12	"Mobile Global Cuisine" (Note: "Mobile Global Cuisine" was produced as the eighth episode of the fifth season, but it aired as the twelfth episode of the season.)	September 18, 2013
13	"My Trip to San Fran" (Note: "My Trip to San Fran" was produced as the second episode of the fifth season, but it aired as the thirteenth episode of the season.)	September 25, 2013

=== Season 6 (2016) ===
No.	Title	Original air date
1	"Last Minute Brunch"	December 7, 2016
2	"Date Night"	December 7, 2016
3	"Spice & Easy"	December 14, 2016
4	"Breakfast for Dinner"	December 14, 2016
