= The Next Food Network Star season 4 =

The Next Food Network Star
- Season 4
- No. of contestants: 10
- Winner: Aaron McCargo, Jr.
- No. of episodes: 9

Release
- Original network: Food Network
- Original release: June 1 – July 27, 2008

Additional information
- Filming dates: February 2008 – March 2008

Season chronology
- ← Previous; Season 3 Next → Season 5

The fourth season of the American reality television series The Next Food Network Star premiered on Sunday, June 1, 2008. Food Network executives, Bob Tuschman and Susie Fogelson, were joined by Bobby Flay as the Selection Committee for this season, which was filmed early 2008 in New York, New York and Las Vegas, Nevada.

Aaron McCargo, Jr. was announced as the winner on the season finale, which aired on Sunday, July 27, 2008. His show, Big Daddy's House, premiered on August 3, 2008. In addition, runner-up Adam Gertler was given a show, Will Work for Food, which premiered January 19, 2009 and Kelsey Nixon, who finished fourth, began hosting her show, Kelsey's Essentials, on the Cooking Channel on November 6, 2010. According to a 2017 D Magazine interview, runner-up Lisa Garza was also offered a contract on Food Network, but she declined.

== Contestants ==
(In order of elimination)

- Cory Kahaney, 45 - New York, New York; Stand-up Comedian
- Kevin Roberts, 39 - San Diego, California; Radio Talk Show Host/Restaurant Owner/Author
- Jeffrey Vaden, 43 - White Plains, New York; Food Service Manager
- Nipa Bhatt, 35 - Victoria, Minnesota; Marketing Manager
- Jennifer Cochrane, 32 - Woonsocket, Rhode Island; Chef
- Shane Lyons, 19 - Colorado Springs, Colorado; Private Chef/Actor
- Kelsey Nixon, 23 - North Ogden, Utah; Assistant Culinary Director —Fan Favorite

=== Runners-Up ===
- Lisa Garza, 32 - Dallas, Texas;
- Adam Gertler, 30 - Philadelphia, Pennsylvania; Food server

=== Winner ===
- Aaron McCargo, Jr., 38 - Camden, New Jersey; Chef

== Contestant progress ==
Episode	1	2	3	4	5	6	7	8^{3}	9
Mini; Challenge; Winner	None^{1}	Aaron; Adam; Jennifer	Adam	Kelsey	Shane	None^{2}	None^{2}	None^{1}	None^{2}
Aaron	WIN	WIN	HIGH	LOW	LOW	HIGH	HIGH	IN	WINNER
Adam	IN	LOW	HIGH	LOW	LOW	HIGH	LOW	IN	RUNNER-UP
Lisa	LOW	WIN	WIN	HIGH	IN	LOW	LOW	IN	RUNNER-UP
Kelsey	WIN	HIGH	LOW	WIN	WIN	LOW	OUT		FAN FAVORITE
Shane	LOW	IN	IN	HIGH	WIN	OUT			
Jennifer	IN	IN	LOW	LOW	OUT				
Nipa	LOW	LOW	LOW	OUT					
Jeffrey	HIGH	LOW	OUT						
Kevin	IN	OUT							
Cory	OUT								

^Note 1 : No winner was announced for the Mini Challenge.
^Note 2 : There was no Mini Challenge in this episode.
^Note 3 : No one was eliminated in this episode.

(WINNER) The contestant won the competition, and became "The Next Food Network Star".
(RUNNER-UP) The contestant made it to the finale, but did not win.
(FAN FAVORITE) The contestant was voted the Fan Favorite for the competition in an online poll.
(WIN) The contestant won that episode's Elimination Challenge.
(HIGH) The contestant was one of the Selection Committee's favorites for that week, but did not win the Elimination Challenge.
(IN) The contestant was neither the Selection Committee's favorite nor the least favorite. They were not up for elimination.
(LOW) The contestant was one of the Selection Committee's least favorites for that week, but was not in the Bottom 2.
(LOW) The contestant was one of the Selection Committee's least favorites for that week and was in the Bottom 2, but was not eliminated.
(OUT) The contestant was the Selection Committee's least favorite for that week, and was eliminated.

== Episodes ==
=== Week 1: Star Quality ===
- Mini Challenge: Upon arriving at the Food Network Studios, the contestants were met by Alton Brown. He told them their first challenge was to explain their culinary point of view in one sentence on camera, with the option of using a prop. The Selection Committee later watched the videos made in this challenge.
  - Winner: None
- Elimination Challenge: The contestants were paired randomly into the following five teams:
  - Nipa and Shane
  - Aaron and Kelsey
  - Lisa and Kevin
  - Adam and Jennifer
  - Jeffrey and Cory
- Each of these teams was required to prepare three dishes (each contestant prepared one dish and the team prepared one collaborative dish) and presented them to the Selection Committee, as well as a group of current Food Network personalities including Iron Chef Masaharu Morimoto, Pat and Gina Neely, Sandra Lee, and Giada De Laurentiis.
  - Winners: Aaron and Kelsey
  - Eliminated: Cory

Original Air Date: June 1, 2008

=== Week 2: FN Star On the Go ===
- Mini Challenge: Chef Robert Irvine woke the contestants at three o'clock in the morning and had them randomly separate into three teams: Jeffrey, Kelsey and Kevin; Aaron, Adam and Jennifer; and Lisa, Nipa and Shane. In these teams, the contestants had to race to three locations in the New York area, where they were asked a culinary trivia question. If they answered their question correctly, they could select an ingredient and continue to the next location. If they did not, they had to perform a food preparation task before continuing and selecting an ingredient. These tasks included rolling dough for baguettes and butchering a chicken. The first team to go to all three locations and meet chef Irvine in a "secret location" would be able to go first in the Elimination Challenge.
  - Winners: Aaron, Adam, and Jennifer
- Elimination Challenge: Using the foods they collected in the scavenger hunt (a loaf of bread, a type of cheese and a cut of meat) as well as the ingredients provided for them, teams each had to prepare brunch for the Selection Committee, Irvine and 30 other guests aboard a moving M&E Railway train. The winners of the challenge were featured in an issue of USA Weekend.
  - Winners: Lisa and Aaron
  - Eliminated: Kevin

Original Air Date: June 8, 2008

=== Week 3: You ... In a Jar ===
- Mini Challenge: Bobby Flay greeted the contestants in the Food Network Kitchens, where he gave them thirty minutes to prepare a dish representing their culinary point of view using russet potatoes. Then, they were given one minute to present their dish on camera, with the Selection Committee watching. The contestants' performance in this challenge was considered during the Evaluation, and so the winner of this challenge could not be eliminated.
  - Winner: Adam
- Elimination Challenge: Following in the footsteps of such Food Network stars as Emeril Lagasse and Paula Deen, the contestants were required to create their own packaged food product, as well as a simple dish using this product. Then, they had to present it to fifty food buyers, the Selection Committee and Martha Stewart, who served as a surprise guest judge for this challenge.
  - Winner: Lisa
  - Eliminated: Jeffrey

Original Air Date: June 15, 2008

=== Week 4: Being an Expert ===
- Mini Challenge: Tyler Florence told the contestants they were required to create a sixty-second video demonstrating a cooking technique using a product given to them only seconds before recording. The winning video was featured on the Food Network website, and the winner of the challenge was allowed to pick their ingredients first and serve first in the next challenge.
  - Winner: Kelsey
- Elimination Challenge: The contestants were then met by Iron Chef Michael Symon, who said that each contestant had to select a fish (cod, tilapia, trout, sole, halibut, mahi mahi or Arctic char) and use it to prepare two dishes. The first dish had to be an "accessible dish" which could be featured on the Red Lobster fresh fish menu. The second dish had to feature a special ingredient selected at the beginning of the challenge (white chocolate, cola, coffee beans, marshmallow creme, grape jelly, caramel or fruit cereal). The winning "accessible" dish was put on the fresh fish menu at all Red Lobster restaurants. For this episode, Michael Symon sat in for Bobby on the Selection Committee, and Red Lobster's senior executive chef, Michael LaDuke, served as a special guest judge.
  - Winner: Kelsey
  - Eliminated: Nipa

Original Air Date: June 22, 2008

=== Week 5: Enticing and Easy with Bon Appétit ===
- Mini Challenge: At the beginning of this challenge, Iron Chef Cat Cora greeted the contestants, and gave each of them a basket filled with a set of six ingredients. Using these ingredients, the contestants had to prepare a dish in 30 minutes which they would later need to describe on camera. However, at the conclusion of the cooking, Cat announced they would not be describing their own dishes, but that of another contestant. The winner was allowed to pick the dish they and their partner would be making in the Elimination Challenge, as well as assign dishes to other pairs.
  - Winner: Shane
- Elimination Challenge: The contestants were randomly split into three teams:
  - Kelsey and Shane
  - Aaron and Adam
  - Jennifer and Lisa
- In these teams, the contestants were required to recreate one of three classic dishes, coq au vin, beef Wellington, or turducken, each of which typically take extensive planning and preparation, preparing a version of it in 45 minutes that would be accessible to home cooks. As the winner of the preliminary challenge, Shane chose to make a variation of beef Wellington with Kelsey, while assigning Aaron and Adam to cook coq au vin, and Lisa and Jennifer to prepare turducken. After cooking, the contestants had to present their dish to the Selection Committee and the editors of Bon Appétit magazine, as well as Cat Cora, who participated in the Selection Committee this week. The winning recipe was featured in the August issue of Bon Appétit.
  - Winners: Kelsey and Shane
  - Eliminated: Jennifer

Original Air Date: June 29, 2008

=== Week 6: Into the Studio ===
- Mini Challenge: None
- Elimination Challenge: Bobby Flay announced to the five remaining contestants that they would each be doing a 4-minute cooking demonstration on the Rachael Ray Show, in front of a live studio audience. He told them they had to prepare an innovative and nutritious meal that appealed to an 8-year-old Girl Scout, and that had a main course and at least one side dish. The contestants had time to talk with the Girl Scout on what they like to eat and were given 75 minutes to prepare the meal. Then, they would demonstrate the meal on the show, with the assistance of their respective Girl Scout. Rachael Ray served as a special guest judge for this episode.
  - Winner: None, although Adam and Aaron's recipes, the two that were the best received among the Selection Committee, were shown as the featured recipes on the show website.
  - Eliminated: Shane

Original Air Date: July 6, 2008

=== Week 7: Vegas Throwdown ===
- Mini Challenge: None
- Elimination Challenge: The final four contestants were flown to Las Vegas, where they were told by Bobby Flay that they would be participating in a challenge modeled after his show Throwdown! with Bobby Flay. They were then assigned an opponent, and told they had to prepare "Vegas Style" versions of their own and their opponent's signature dishes in 75 minutes, while also answering questions from the Selection Committee, guest judge Paula Deen and Dayna Devon of Extra. Adam was paired against Lisa, with each of them preparing a version of Adam's signature macaroni and cheese and Lisa's cassoulet, while Kelsey was paired against Aaron, each of them having to make a variation of Kelsey's chicken parmesan and Aaron's stuffed pork tenderloin.
  - Winner: None, although Aaron's food was most well received by the panel. However, Lisa's cassoulet, and Adam's macaroni and cheese, as well as both of Aaron's dishes, were shown as the featured dishes on the show website.
  - Eliminated: Kelsey

Original Air Date: July 13, 2008

=== Week 8: Ultimate Vegas ===
- Mini Challenge: The contestants were met by Bobby Flay and guest judge Guy Fieri, who told them they would be taping scripted 30-second promos in iconic Las Vegas locations. Aaron's promo featured him on a casino floor with gamblers, Adam's promo featured him on stage with showgirls, and Lisa's promo featured her rising up a shaft by cable, speaking her lines on camera at each level she reached.
  - Winner: None
- Elimination Challenge: The contestants then had six hours to create an extravagant, lavish buffet for the Selection Committee, Guy, the chefs from the Wynn Casino, and a group of Las Vegas entertainers, with the assistance of one of three previously eliminated contestants (Kelsey, Shane or Jennifer). After a lengthy debate, the Selection Committee announced that for the first time ever, they would be taking all three contestants back to New York for the finale, due to the difficulties they had selecting someone to eliminate.
  - Winner: None, although Adam's smoked pork chops were considered the best dish of the challenge, and were shown as the featured recipe on the show website.
  - Eliminated: None

Original Air Date: July 20, 2008

=== Week 9: Finale ===
- Mini Challenge: None
- Elimination Challenge: After returning to New York City, the final three contestants learned that they would each be creating a fully produced, four and a half minute pilot presentation for their own respective TV show, with accomplished producer Gordon Elliott, as well as a complete production crew. First, each contestant had to conceive a pitch and present it to Gordon, who would then give them feedback and help them mold their idea into a TV show. Lisa came up with three different pitches: Beautiful Basics, Pure and Simple, and Fashion Feast, each of which merge her straightforward approach to cooking with either fine dining, organics and green living, or high fashion, respectively. With Gordon's advice, she chose to pursue the Beautiful Basics pitch, as he felt both of the other ideas were too inaccessible for home viewers. Adam created an idea titled I'm Always Hungry in Philadelphia, in which viewers talked to him by webcam, asking him to "spice up" one of their boring, old recipes, or to prepare his interpretation of a certain dish. Gordon liked the idea, because he thought it separated him from the other finalists. Lastly, Aaron thought of a concept called Too Bold and Flavorful, in which he prepares food with big, bold flavors, while also showcasing different types of herbs and spices. He also came up with an idea called Leftovers not Forgotten, which was about re-using leftovers, but Gordon quickly dismissed it, favoring Aaron's first idea, which together they renamed Big Daddy's House. Soon after being perfected, the selected pitches then went into production on the set of 30 Minute Meals. While filming, each contestant had a few problems, but with the help of Gordon they were then able to fix them and continue filming.
- Finale Presentation: At the beginning of this prerecorded segment, Bobby Flay introduced the final three contestants to a live studio audience, which included their friends and family members and the previously eliminated contestants. The three fully finished pilots were then shown, after which the Selection Committee privately discussed each contestant's highs and lows in the challenge. After making a final decision, the Selection Committee returned to the main studio, where Bobby proclaimed Aaron the Next Food Network Star.
  - Runners-Up: Adam and Lisa
  - The Next Food Network Star: Aaron McCargo, Jr.
  - New Show: Big Daddy's House
- Note: This episode was the most-watched telecast in Food Network history.

Original Air Date: July 27, 2008

== Early announcement of winner ==
Food Network made an error on July 24, 2008, in which the winner, Aaron McCargo, Jr., was inadvertently revealed on the show's website. His profile on the site, videos of his winning moment and of the production of his series, Big Daddy's House were available for viewing. When you visited the runners'-up profiles, their exit interviews and failed pilots were also available.
