= Aarón Sánchez (chef) =

American chef and television personality (born 1976)

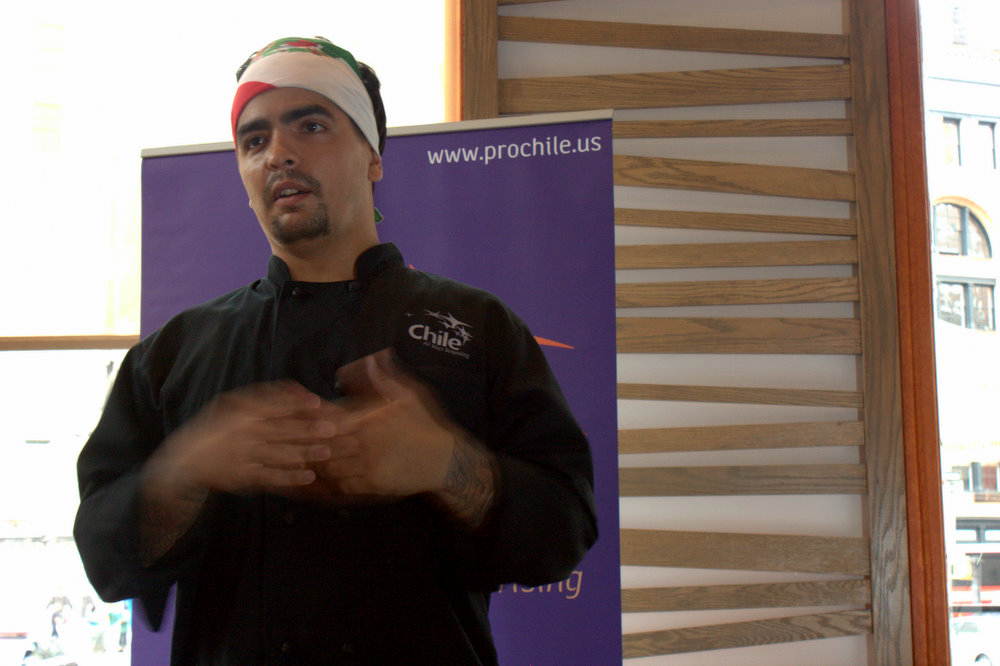
- Sánchez in 2009
- Born: February 12, 1976 (age 50); Chihuahua, Mexico
- Education: Johnson & Wales University
- Spouse: Ifé Mora (m. 2009; div. 2012)
- Children: 1
- Mother: Zarela Martínez
- Culinary career
- Cooking style: Cajun cuisine, Louisiana Creole cuisine, Mexican cuisine
- Current restaurant
- "Johnny Sánchez"
- Television shows
- Chefs vs. City (2009–2010); Heat Seekers (2011–2012); Taco Trip (2014–2015); MasterChef (2017–2024); MasterChef Junior (2018–ongoing)
- Website: chefaaronsanchez.com

Aarón Sánchez (born February 12, 1976) is a Mexican celebrity chef, restaurateur, cookbook author, television personality host, entrepreneur, and philanthropist. He is the executive head chef and part-owner of the Mexican restaurant Johnny Sánchez in New Orleans.

He co-starred on Food Network's hit series Chopped and Chopped Jr. and hosted Cooking Channel's Emmy-nominated Taco Trip. He has appeared on Iron Chef America, and is one of the few chefs whose battles have ended in a draw, tying with Masaharu Morimoto in "Battle Black Bass" in season 2. He was also a contestant on The Next Iron Chef. He is the author of two cookbooks, and had a memoir released October 1, 2019. He launched the Aarón Sánchez Scholarship Fund to empower aspiring chefs from the Latin community to follow their dreams and attend culinary school. In the spring of 2017, he became a full-time judge co-hosting FOX's hit reality-TV culinary competition series MasterChef for Season 8, which aired over the summer of 2017 alongside Gordon Ramsay, Joe Bastianich and Christina Tosi after previously guest-starring in season 7 as a guest judge until his departure from the show after Season 14. He has also joined the judging panel of MasterChef Junior since its 7th season, which debuted in March 2019, after guest-starring in season 5, which debuted early 2017.

== Personal life ==
Aarón and his twin brother Rodrigo, an attorney in New York City, were born in 1976, in Chihuahua, Mexico, to Zarela Martínez, a restaurateur and the author of several cookbooks, and Adolfo Sanchez. He began cooking at an early age, helping his mother prepare traditional Mexican foods for her catering business. In 1984, the family moved to New York, and his mother launched the acclaimed Café Marimba, where Sánchez began to cook in a professional kitchen. At age 16, Sánchez's mother sent him to New Orleans to spend the summer working with Chef Paul Prudhomme. In 1994, Sánchez graduated from Dwight School, and began to work full-time for Prudhomme in New Orleans. Sánchez was married to singer Ifé Mora from 2009 until 2012. He has a son named Yuma. On episode 21 of MasterChef season 9, he revealed that his mentor was Jonathan Waxman.

== Career ==
In 1996, after working under Prudhomme, Aarón returned north to study culinary arts at Johnson & Wales University in Providence, Rhode Island. In 1996, he returned to New York, and worked in the kitchen at Patria under nuevo-Latino chef, Douglas Rodriguez. Sánchez met his future business partner, Alex Garcia while working there.

Garcia left Patria in 1996 to open Erizo Latino, taking Sánchez to help open the restaurant. Reviews were positive, referring to the restaurant as "casual" and "earthy," and "the fare is enticingly wholesome, and the kitchen's best dishes make a fine introduction to the cooking of Central and South America."

Sánchez then became executive chef at L-Ray, which specialized in foods from the Caribbean and Gulf of Mexico. This was followed by another executive chef position at Isla, a restaurant inspired by pre-Revolutionary Cuba. Sanchez then moved to San Francisco, working under Chef Reed Hearon at Rose Pistola.

Eamon Furlong hired Sánchez in 2000, to open Paladar, a pan-Latin restaurant on the Lower East Side. It opened in February 2001, and won Time Out New York's award for Best New Lower East Side Restaurant that year. It went on to be named the Best Latin American Restaurant in their 2002 Eating and Drinking Guide. Paladar had been reviewed as being "colorful, lively circus of a restaurant that’s equal parts serious cooking and serious partying," and was named a Critic's Pick by New York magazine. Sánchez sold his interest in the Paladar restaurant in 2010.

Sánchez went on to become chef of Mexican New York eatery Centrico, which closed in 2012.

He opened the restaurant Johnny Sánchez in Baltimore with fellow chef John Besh in August 2014. The Baltimore location closed in September 2017. The pair opened a second Johnny Sánchez location in October 2014 in New Orleans. As of February 2019, Besh is no longer a part of Johnny Sánchez; Aarón Sánchez and partners, Miles Landrem and Drew Mire, purchased and now own the restaurant. The three partners also are planning to develop a second restaurant in New Orleans, eyeing the Mid-City area, though the name and location have not been announced.

In 2017, he joined MasterChef US Season 8 as a judge alongside Gordon Ramsay and Christina Tosi, replacing Graham Elliot, to taste and help judge contestants' cooking and baking with Ramsay and Tosi in order to crown the next MasterChef. He is an expert in many cooking techniques and global cuisines, but his specialty of cooking traditional Mexican cuisine is often used throughout the season.

In 2019, he guest-starred on the first episode of Gordon Ramsay's 24 Hours to Hell and Back season 2 as an extra expeditor, and revealed he lives nearby to The Trolley Café in New Orleans. Sánchez released a memoir, Where I Come From: Life Lessons From a Latino Chef, on October 1, 2019.

He is also a recurring judge on Chopped.

In 2020, he guest judged a Mexican food challenge on season 19 of Hell's Kitchen.

== Television appearances ==
Year(s)	Title	Network	Notes
2001–2002	Melting Pot	Food Network	Co-Host with Alex Garcia
2002	Boy Meets Grill	Food Network	Season 1, episode 1: "Latin Style Sizzle"
2007	Throwdown! with Bobby Flay	Food Network	Season 3, episode 2: "Puffy Tacos"
2009	Food Detectives	Food Network	Season 2, episode 1: "Tastes Like Chicken"
2009	Chefs vs. City	Food Network	Co-Host (7 episodes) with Chris Cosentino
2010	Food(ography)	Cooking Channel	Season 1, episode 11: "Hot and Spicy"
2010–2011	Unique Eats	Cooking Channel	Season 1, Episodes 1-10 Season 2, Episodes 1–3, 5, 9-11, 13
2011	Mike & Mike	ESPN	September 23, 2011
2011	Aarón Loves New York	Fox Network	TV series documentary
2009–2011	The Best Thing I Ever Ate	Cooking Channel	Season 1, Episodes 1, 5, 7-9 Season 2, Episodes 1, 4, 5, 7, 9 Season 3, Episodes 5, 7, 9-11 Season 4, Episodes 2, 6, 11, 12, 14, 15 Season 6, Episodes 4, 6
2011–2012	Heat Seekers	Cooking Channel	Co-Host (16 episodes) with Roger Mooking
2012	Food Network Star	Food Network	Season 8, episode 10: "Pilot Greenlights", Panelist
2011–2013	The Best Thing I Ever Made	Food Network	Season 1, Episodes 2, 3 Season 3, Episodes 7, 13
2005–2013	Iron Chef America	Food Network	Season 2, episode 4: "Morimoto vs. Sanchez: Black Bass", Challenger Chef Season 10, episode 30: "Thanksgiving Showdown: Thanksgiving Leftovers", Team Chopped Season 10, episode 31: "Holiday Battle: Gingerbread", ICA Judge Season 11, episode 13: "Tournament of Champions: Michael Symon vs. Geoffrey Zakarian: Battle Wings", Judge
2014	The Taste	ABC	Season 2, episode 3: "Guilty Pleasures", guest Mentor
2014	Rachael vs. Guy: Celebrity Cook-Off	Food Network	Season 3, episode 6: "Sink or Swim", Judge
2014	Southern Fried Everything	Great American Country	Season 1, episode 7: "Tasty Taters" Season 1, episode 9: "Yankee Fried"
2014	Rewrapped	Food Network	Season 2, episode 5: "Boy, Ar-Dees Good!"
2014	Finding Your Roots	PBS	Season 2, episode 5: "The Melting Pot"
2015	Beat Bobby Flay	Food Network	Season 3, episode 9: "Pot Calling the Kettle Beat", Judge & Mentor
2015	Best.Ever.	Food Network	Season 1, episode 1: "Best.BBQ.Ever" Season 1, episode 2: "Best.Pizza.Ever" Season 1, episode 3: "Best.Burger.Ever"
2014–2015	Taco Trip	Cooking Channel	Host (18 episodes)
2016	All-Star Academy	Food Network	Season 2, episode 2: "Geography", Co-Host & Judge
2016	Celebrity Food Fight	Food Network	Season 2, episode 1: "Tom Arnold and Melissa Rivers: Down and Dirty Dinner Battle" Season 2, episode 3: "Andy Dick Is Coming to Dinner"
2014–2016	Chopped After Hours	Food Network	12 episodes
2016	Eat the World with Emeril Lagasse	Amazon Prime Video	Season 1, episode 6: "Forbidden Cuba"
2015–2016	Guilty Pleasures	Food Network	Season 2, episode 1: "Thanksgiving Madness" Season 2, episode 11: "Big Game, Big Eats" Season 3, episode 2: "Pizza and Pigzilla!" Season 3, episode 7: "Super-Stuffed Gluttony!" Season 3, episode 13: "O.M.G. Food!"
2015–2016	Chopped Junior	Food Network	Season 1, episode 10: "Birthday Cake Crush", Judge Season 3, episode 7: "Think Fig", Judge Season 3, episode 8: "Curry Hurry", Judge Season 4, episode 8: "Got Elk?", Judge
2009–2017	Chopped	Food Network	Judge (143 episodes), Competitor (3 episodes) First Runner-Up on Chopped All-Stars
2016–2024	MasterChef	FOX	Season 7, episode 6: "Gordon Ramsay Masterclass", guest Judge Season 8 to 14, Co-Host & Judge
2017	Simply Ming	PBS	Season 15, episode 3: "Aaron Sanchez"
2018–present	MasterChef Junior	FOX	Season 5, episode 3: "Just Like Gordon", guest Judge Season 5, episode 10: "Winter Wonderland", guest Judge Season 7 to Present, Co-Host & Judge
2019	24 Hrs to Hell and Back	FOX	Season 2, episode 1: "The Trolley Stop Café"
2020	Hell's Kitchen	ITV2 (UK), FOX (US)	Episode: "Hell Starts Taking Its Toll"
2021	Selena + Chef	HBO Max	Season 3, episode 3: "Selena + Aarón Sánchez"

2026 ‘’Wildcard Kitchen’m Food Network Season 3, episode 6: “Winner Takes All” }

== Bibliography ==
Cookbooks

- La Comida del Barrio: Latin-American Cooking in the U.S.A., 2003, ISBN 978-0-609-61075-6
- Simple Food Big Flavor: Unforgettable Mexican-Inspired Recipes from My Kitchen to Yours, 2011, ISBN 978-1451611502

Memoir

- Where I Come From: Life Lessons From a Latino Chef, 2019, ISBN 978-1-4197-3802-9
