= Big Daddy's House =

- Starring: Aaron McCargo, Jr.
- Country of origin: United States
- No. of seasons: 6
- No. of episodes: 77

Production
- Running time: 105 mins

Original release
- Network: Food Network

Big Daddy's House is a cooking show on the specialty channel Food Network. The show stars Aaron McCargo, Jr., the winner of the fourth season of the network's reality television series, The Next Food Network Star. The six-episode first season was McCargo's grand prize for winning the reality show. The first episode aired on Sunday, August 3, 2008, at 1:30 p.m., just one week after the last episode of The Next Food Network Star.

McCargo left his job as the executive catering chef of Thomas Jefferson University Hospital in Philadelphia to work on Big Daddy's House. The show aimed to show cooks, even those with little culinary experience, that making and preparing quality food can be easy, flavorful and enjoyable. When asked to describe the goal of his show, McCargo said, "Fun...bottom line. This is about having fun with your children, your spouse, your neighbors." McCargo, who adopts a friendly, casual demeanor on the screen, said he sought to make viewers feel confident about their kitchen skills. The Food Network billed Big Daddy's House as featuring "simple, fun and mouth-watering recipes that illustrate Aaron's love for big, bold flavors". CBS News said of McCargo, "Aaron not only brings his passion for down-to-earth cooking to the kitchen, he brings a warm and inviting personality."

The first season ended in early September. Big Daddy's House ranked as the number one "in the kitchen"-style weekend show on the Food Network during its initial six-episode run. An average of 25 percent of the show's viewership were African Americans, which satisfied a hope by the Food Network to raise the overall diversity of the network's viewers. Big Daddy's House was renewed for a second season, which premiered on January 4, 2009. The third season began on July 12, 2009.
