= Fire Masters =

Canadian food reality television series

- Genre: Food reality television
- Presented by: Dylan Benoit
- Country of origin: Canada
- Original language: English
- No. of seasons: 5
- No. of episodes: 60

Production
- Running time: 41:00
- Production company: Architect Films

Original release
- Network: Cooking Channel; Food Network Canada
- Release: July 6, 2019 – October 13, 2022

Fire Masters is a Canadian cooking reality competition television series that began airing simultaneously on Food Network Canada in Canada and Cooking Channel in the United States on July 6, 2019. The show is presented by chef Dylan Benoit, and it features three barbecue chefs competing in three rounds, where the winner of the second round wins a Napoleon portable barbecue grill and then competes against one of the three judges in the final round for a prize of $10,000.

Fire Masters was initially supposed to air for only one season; but a second season began airing on December 21, 2019. There are currently five seasons of the show.

== Episodes ==
- KEY
- (J)udge
- KEY
- (J)udge
- KEY
- (J)udge

=== Season 1 (2019) ===
No.	Title	Feast of Fire (final round) theme	Original air date	Judges	Contestant	Result
1	"Hearts on Fire"	Into the Wild	July 6, 2019	Connie DeSousa; Ray Lampe; Hugh Mangum	Connie DeSousa (J)	WINNER
1	"Hearts on Fire"	Into the Wild	July 6, 2019	Connie DeSousa; Ray Lampe; Hugh Mangum	Trish Gill	RUNNER-UP
1	"Hearts on Fire"	Into the Wild	July 6, 2019	Connie DeSousa; Ray Lampe; Hugh Mangum	Erik Dandee	3rd place
1	"Hearts on Fire"	Into the Wild	July 6, 2019	Connie DeSousa; Ray Lampe; Hugh Mangum	Marco Niccoli	4th place
2	"That's the Way the Chicharrón Crumbles"	Campfire Cookout	July 13, 2019	Amy Mills; Eddie Jackson; Andy Husbands	Rusty Johnson	WINNER
2	"That's the Way the Chicharrón Crumbles"	Campfire Cookout	July 13, 2019	Amy Mills; Eddie Jackson; Andy Husbands	Amy Mills (J)	RUNNER-UP
2	"That's the Way the Chicharrón Crumbles"	Campfire Cookout	July 13, 2019	Amy Mills; Eddie Jackson; Andy Husbands	Adrian Acosta	3rd place
2	"That's the Way the Chicharrón Crumbles"	Campfire Cookout	July 13, 2019	Amy Mills; Eddie Jackson; Andy Husbands	Brad Orrison	4th place
3	"For the Love of Chuck"	Tuscan trattoria	July 20, 2019	Kevin Bludso; Tiffani Faison; Dale MacKay	Dale MacKay (J)	WINNER
3	"For the Love of Chuck"	Tuscan trattoria	July 20, 2019	Kevin Bludso; Tiffani Faison; Dale MacKay	Jennifer Hunter	RUNNER-UP
3	"For the Love of Chuck"	Tuscan trattoria	July 20, 2019	Kevin Bludso; Tiffani Faison; Dale MacKay	Adam Pereira	3rd place
3	"For the Love of Chuck"	Tuscan trattoria	July 20, 2019	Kevin Bludso; Tiffani Faison; Dale MacKay	Serge Belair	4th place
4	"Sticks and Stones...but Please No Bones!"	Mardi Gras	July 27, 2019	Eddie Jackson; Andrea Nicholson; Andy Husbands	Eddie Jackson (J)	WINNER
4	"Sticks and Stones...but Please No Bones!"	Mardi Gras	July 27, 2019	Eddie Jackson; Andrea Nicholson; Andy Husbands	Roary MacPherson	RUNNER-UP
4	"Sticks and Stones...but Please No Bones!"	Mardi Gras	July 27, 2019	Eddie Jackson; Andrea Nicholson; Andy Husbands	Michael Kirkwood	3rd place
4	"Sticks and Stones...but Please No Bones!"	Mardi Gras	July 27, 2019	Eddie Jackson; Andrea Nicholson; Andy Husbands	Allan Feldman	4th place
5	"No Charred Feelings"	Cape Cod	August 3, 2019	Hugh Mangum; Tiffani Faison; Kevin Bludso	Tiffani Faison (J)	WINNER
5	"No Charred Feelings"	Cape Cod	August 3, 2019	Hugh Mangum; Tiffani Faison; Kevin Bludso	Cam Dobranski	RUNNER-UP
5	"No Charred Feelings"	Cape Cod	August 3, 2019	Hugh Mangum; Tiffani Faison; Kevin Bludso	Felix Zhou	3rd place
5	"No Charred Feelings"	Cape Cod	August 3, 2019	Hugh Mangum; Tiffani Faison; Kevin Bludso	Tigretón Marques	4th place
6	"No Grits No Glory"	Southern comfort	August 3, 2019	Dale MacKay; Eddie Jackson; Andrea Nicholson	Lindsay Porter	WINNER
6	"No Grits No Glory"	Southern comfort	August 3, 2019	Dale MacKay; Eddie Jackson; Andrea Nicholson	Dale MacKay (J)	RUNNER-UP
6	"No Grits No Glory"	Southern comfort	August 3, 2019	Dale MacKay; Eddie Jackson; Andrea Nicholson	Humberto Sanchez	3rd place
6	"No Grits No Glory"	Southern comfort	August 3, 2019	Dale MacKay; Eddie Jackson; Andrea Nicholson	Steve Buzak	4th place

== Winners ==
Season	Winner
1	Rusty Johnson
2	
3	Aakash Dhall
4	
5	
