= Sinful Sweets =

American food reality television series

- Genre: Food reality television
- Presented by: Harry Eastwood
- Country of origin: United States
- Original language: English
- No. of seasons: 1
- No. of episodes: 6

Production
- Producer: Pernel Media
- Running time: 22:00

Original release
- Network: Cooking Channel
- Release: October 30, 2015 – present

Sinful Sweets is an American culinary reality television series that airs on Cooking Channel. It is presented by chef Harry Eastwood. The series features her traveling the United States while indulging in various sweet desserts and baked goods, as well as her helping make the items.

Sinful Sweets premiered on October 30, 2015.
