= Taco Trip =

American television series

Taco Trip is a Cooking Channel show exploring Latin cuisine in America, hosted by chef Aaron Sanchez. The show debuted on December 16, 2014, and concluded on January 20, 2015, featuring Chef Sanchez visiting taquerias in six American cities. Sanchez visited a different city in each episode to explore its cuisine, starting with Chicago, followed by New Orleans, Portland, San Francisco, Philadelphia, and Nashville.

== Episodes ==
Episode	Show #	Date	City
1	CCTAC-101H	December 16, 2014	Chicago, Illinois
2	CCTAC-102H	December 23, 2014	New Orleans, Louisiana
3	CCTAC-103H	December 30, 2014	Portland, Oregon
4	CCTAC-104H	January 6, 2015	San Francisco, California
5	CCTAC-105H	January 13, 2015	Philadelphia, Pennsylvania
6	CCTAC-106H	January 20, 2015	Nashville, Tennessee
