= Dylan Benoit =

Canadian chef

- Born: 1988 or 1989 (age 37–38); Scarborough, Ontario, Canada
- Education: George Brown College
- Culinary career
- Television show: Fire Masters
- Website: http://www.dylanbenoit.com

Dylan Benoit is a Canadian-born chef who currently hosts the Food Network Canada/Cooking Channel television series Fire Masters.

== Early life and education ==
Benoit was born in Scarborough, Ontario; but his family relocated to Midhurst before eventually settling in Barrie. After attending St. Joseph's High School, he attended George Brown College and graduated with a degree in culinary arts.

== Personal life ==
Benoit worked under chef Mark McEwan at ONE restaurant prior to becoming a private chef. He currently hosts the Food Network Canada/Cooking Channel television series Fire Masters. Since 2010, Benoit has resided in the Cayman Islands.
