= Kelsey's Homemade =

American cooking show

- Genre: Cooking show; Food reality television
- Presented by: Kelsey Nixon
- Country of origin: United States
- Original language: English
- No. of seasons: 1
- No. of episodes: 6

Production
- Producer: Rock Shrimp Productions
- Running time: 22:00

Original release
- Network: Cooking Channel
- Release: November 14 – December 19, 2015

Kelsey's Homemade is an American cooking-themed reality television series that aired on Cooking Channel. It is presented by chef Kelsey Nixon. The series features Nixon traveling to different eateries and then using the featured foods as inspiration for home-cooked meals for her family.

== Episodes ==
No.	Title	Original air date
1	"Last Minute Brunch"	November 14, 2015
2	"Date Night"	November 21, 2015
3	"Spice & Easy"	November 28, 2015
4	"Breakfast for Dinner"	December 5, 2015
5	"Frozen Fixes"	December 12, 2015
6	"Girls Night In"	December 19, 2015
