= Beach Bites with Katie Lee =

American food reality television series

- Genre: Food reality television; Travel documentary
- Presented by: Katie Lee
- Country of origin: United States
- Original language: English
- No. of seasons: 3
- No. of episodes: 21

Production
- Executive producers: Beth Burke; Blake Swerdloff-Helms; Katie Lee
- Producer: BSTV Entertainment
- Running time: 22:00

Original release
- Network: Cooking Channel
- Release: August 21, 2015 – July 12, 2018

Beach Bites with Katie Lee is an American food travelogue television series that aired on Cooking Channel. It is presented by chef Katie Lee. The series featured Lee traveling to different beach destinations and eating the local cuisine.

The pilot episode of Beach Bites aired on August 21, 2015. The series officially premiered on June 2, 2016.

== Episodes ==
=== Season 1 (2015–2016) ===
No.	Title	Original air date
1	"Doing the Island Hop"	August 21, 2015
2	"Hometown Heroes"	June 2, 2016
3	"Authentic Eats"	June 9, 2016
4	"Family Recipes"	June 16, 2016
5	"Twist on a Classic"	June 23, 2016
6	"Beach Bar Snacks"	June 30, 2016
7	"Unexpected Hits"	July 7, 2016

– Sources:
