= Aaron McCargo Jr. =

American chef

- Born: Camden, New Jersey, U.S.
- Occupation(s): Chef, television personality, television host
- Years active: 1993-present
- Television: The Next Food Network Star; Big Daddy's House; Bar Rescue
- Website: www.chefaaronmccargo.com

Aaron McCargo Jr. is an American chef, television personality, and television show host who is best known as the winner of the fourth season of the Food Network's reality television show, Food Network Star.

== Early life and education ==
McCargo was born 22nd July, 1971 and he grew up in Camden, New Jersey, and is one of six children. He became interested in cooking at age four, when he began baking cakes in his sister's Easy-Bake Oven. He began cooking in his family's kitchen at age seven. He was encouraged by his father, Aaron McCargo Sr., who is a cook, and his mother, Julia, who has a preference for food with a great deal of flavor. He first studied cooking in a home economics class at Pyne Poynt Middle School in Camden and began cooking as a junior volunteer in the kitchen of Cooper University Hospital in Camden at age 13. He took further cooking classes at Camden High School, graduating in 1989.
