= Zac Young =

American pastry chef (born 1982)

- Born: 1982 (age 43–44); Portland, Maine, U.S.
- Education: Walnut Hill School; Institute of Culinary Education
- Culinary career
- Television shows
- Top Chef: Just Desserts; Unique Sweets; Bakers v. Fakers; Nailed It!
- Website: www.chefzacyoung.com

Zac Young (born 1982) is an American pastry chef and TV personality. He has been featured on various baking shows on Food Network and the Cooking Channel, most notably on Top Chef: Just Desserts and Unique Sweets. He also appeared as a guest judge on baking competition show Nailed It! on Netflix, Food Network's Halloween Baking Championship, and Food Network's Chopped.

== Early life ==
Zac Young was born in Portland, Maine in 1982 to Jonathan and Susan Lebel Young. Growing up, he wanted to learn how to bake after his vegan mother never baked cookies for him. After participating in community children's theatre shows from third through eighth grade, Young was admitted to Walnut Hill School for the Arts in Natick, Massachusetts. Young momentarily worked as a costume designer before deciding that baking was his true passion. He then moved to New York City in 2003 to enroll at the Institute of Culinary Education and graduated in 2006.

== Career ==
Following graduation from the Institute of Culinary Education, Young first worked under Sebastien Rouxel and Richard Capizzi at Bouchon Bakery, then accepted a pastry chef position at Butter. Young trained in France with Philippe Givre at Valrhona and Philippe Parc at Michel Cluizel. In 2009, Young became executive pastry chef at Flex Mussels on the Upper East Side, where he ran a seasonal pop-up donut shop in Grand Central Station.

Young joined David Burke Group, later renamed Craveable Hospitality Group, in 2012 as an executive pastry chef. In 2015, Young and David Burke Fabrick's pastry chef, Gian Martinez, originated the PieCaken dessert. PieCaken, originally intended to be sold by the slice in restaurants, is a layered dish of pecan pie, pumpkin pie, and spice cake held together with cinnamon buttercream and topped with apple pie filling. (The Wall Street Journal described the piecaken as "a fusion of a pumpkin pie, a pecan pie and an apple upside-down cake".)

== Personal life ==
Young is openly gay.

== Filmography ==
Television performances
Year	Title	Role	Notes
2010	Top Chef: Just Desserts	Self	Contestant
2011-2017	Unique Sweets	Self	
2016-2023	Beat Bobby Flay	Self	
2017-2018	Bakers vs. Fakers	Self	Judge
2017-2019	Chopped	Self	Judge
2017-Present	Halloween Baking Championship	Self	Judge
