= Katie Lee (chef) =

American chef (born 1981)

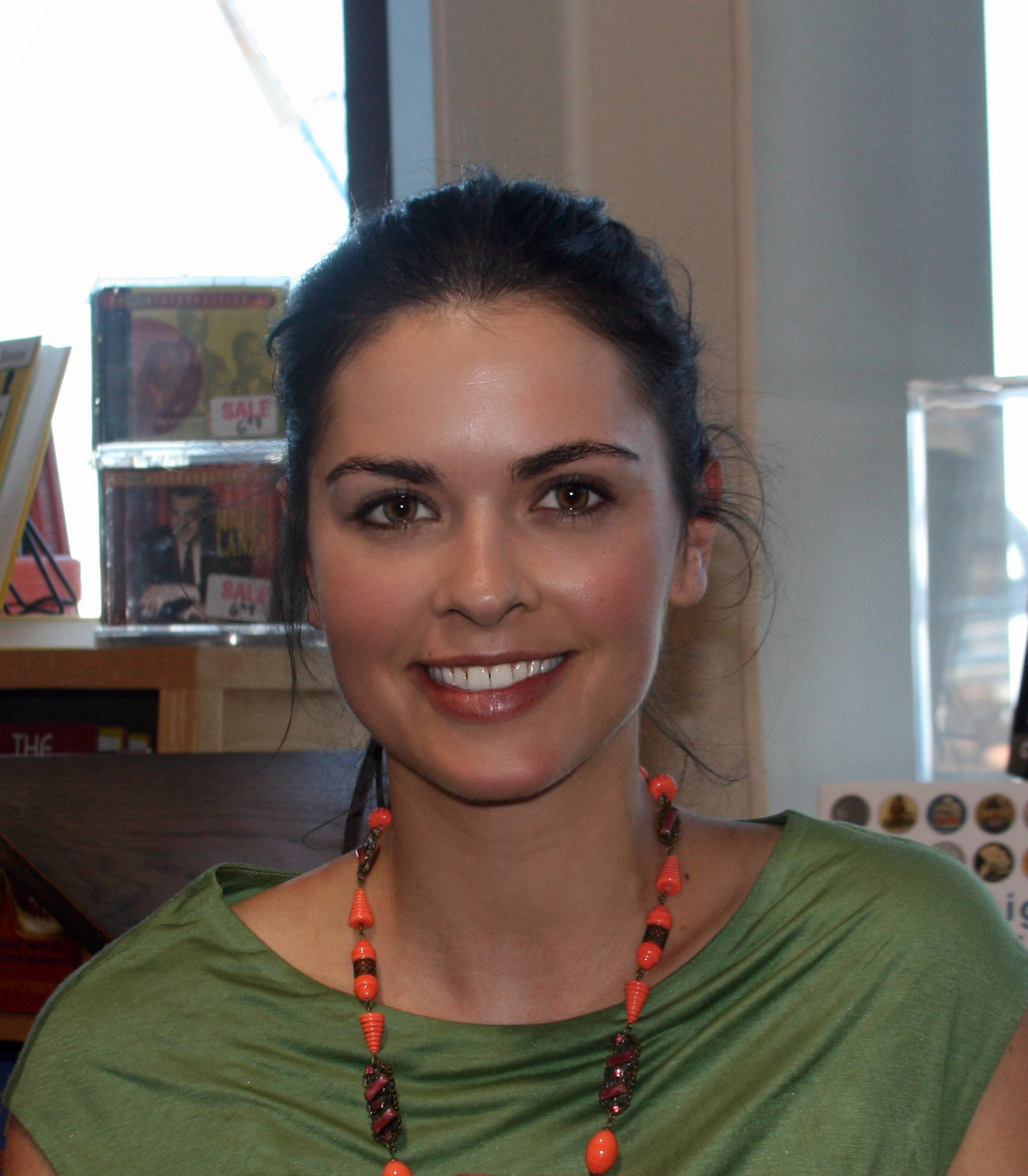
- Lee in 2008
- Born: Katherine Lee; September 14, 1981 (age 45); Huntington, West Virginia, U.S.
- Education: Miami University
- Spouses: Billy Joel (m. 2004; div. 2009); Ryan Biegel (m. 2018)
- Children: 1
- Culinary career
- Television shows
- Beach Bites with Katie Lee; The Kitchen; Kitchen Sink
- Website: www.katieleehome.com

Katherine Lee (born September 14, 1981) is an American cookbook author, television food critic, actor, chef, and novelist born in West Virginia. She has worked in several restaurants and published two cookbooks. She served as a contributor to several magazines and TV shows, including Iron Chef America, an American cooking show competition, where she was a judge in 2007. She is a co-host of Food Network's talk show The Kitchen, and the host of Cooking Channel's Beach Bites with Katie Lee.

== Early life and education ==
Lee was raised in Milton, West Virginia. Lee studied journalism and food science at Miami University in Oxford, Ohio, where she graduated in 2003. While there she was a member of Kappa Alpha Theta. She spent a semester abroad in Florence, Italy at The British Institute.

== Career ==
Lee has worked in several restaurants and gourmet food and wine stores. In 2003, she helped to open Jeff and Eddy's Restaurant where she served as the house fishmonger.

In July 2005, Lee created the foodie website OliveAndPeach.com with partner Aleishall Girard. The web site ceased updating in September 2006.

In 2006, she hosted the first season of Bravo's Top Chef. Subsequently, Bravo replaced her with Padma Lakshmi. She later returned as a guest judge on Top Chef All Stars, Episode 2 ("Night at the Museum") in 2010.

Lee's first cookbook, The Comfort Table, was published by Simon & Schuster. In October 2009, Simon & Schuster released her second cookbook The Comfort Table: Recipes for Everyday Occasions

In June 2011, Lee released her first novel, Groundswell, about a woman recovering from divorce who finds the healing power of surfing.

Lee served as a food and lifestyle contributor for The Early Show and has appeared on Extra as a special correspondent. Additionally, she is a contributing editor to Gotham magazine, and her culinary and lifestyle column, "Katie's Kitchen", is published weekly in its sister magazine Hamptons. Lee has also appeared on Paula's Party, Martha, Today, The Early Show, The Nate Berkus Show, Rachael Ray Show, and Fox News. In 2007, she was a judge on Iron Chef America.

Lee is a member of the Feeding America Entertainment Council. She previously sat on the council of Chefs for Humanity, a group that provides humanitarian aid worldwide. She has also volunteered for Les Dames d'Escoffier, an organization that educates and mentors women in the culinary profession.

Lee appeared on the video blog Wine Library TV with Gary Vaynerchuk on May 8, 2009.

Lee has been a guest judge on Beat Bobby Flay many times, including on July 21, 2016, for a special "Ladies Night" episode.

Lee is a co-host of Food Network's talk show The Kitchen, and the Cooking Channel's Beach Bites with Katie Lee. Lee has also appeared as a judge on Food Network's Halloween Baking Championship.

== Personal life ==
Lee met Billy Joel at the rooftop bar at The Peninsula New York while visiting for a weekend. After dating for a year, she and Joel married at his home in Oyster Bay, Long Island, on October 2, 2004. She was 23 and he, 55. Alexa Ray Joel, Billy Joel's daughter from his marriage to Christie Brinkley, served as maid of honor.

After nearly five years of marriage, Joel and Lee separated in June 2009.

On March 22, 2018, Lee got engaged to television producer Ryan Biegel at La Réserve Hotel and Spa in Paris.

On February 26, 2020, Lee announced on Instagram that she was expecting her first child. Lee gave birth to a daughter.
