= Zarela Martínez =

American restaurateur and cookbook author

- Born: Agua Prieta, Sonora, Mexico
- Occupations: Restaurateur, author
- Partner: Jamie Gillis
- Children: 2, including Aarón Sanchez
- Relatives: Francisco Gabilondo Soler

Zarela Martínez is an American restaurateur and cookbook author. She learned cooking from her mother Aida Gabilondo. Martínez serves on the board of directors for the Mexican Cultural Institute of New York.

== Biography ==
Martínez has been instrumental in introducing Americans to authentic Mexican food through her restaurants and writings. She has organized food festivals in New York City and given cooking lessons, demonstrations, and lectures on Mexican cuisine and culture.

Chef Paul Prudhomme served as Martínez' mentor after he discovered her in a New Orleans cooking class and around 1979, Martínez opened her catering business El Paso. In 1987, Martínez opened Zarela, a Mexican restaurant that is credited as being a pioneer of regional Mexican cuisine in New York City. The restaurant closed in 2011, citing rising expenses and financial issues prompted by an increasing economic crisis.

Martínez has made several television appearances and her 2001 cookbook Zarela's Veracruz was written as the companion book to the 2001 PBS series Zarela! La Cocina Veracruzana. In 2004 she was labeled one of seven individuals that helped redefined the American culinary landscape since the last half of the twentieth century by the U.S. State Department's online publication E-Journal USA: U.S. Society & Values.

As of March 2017, she was working on a book about naturally light Mexican food.

== Beyond cooking ==
From 2004-2007 The Zarela Casa line of soft goods (tablecloths, place mats napkins, shower curtains, towels and other bath items, pillows) inspired by traditional Mexican textile designs were on sale at Walmart stores around the country.

In 2016 she starred in the movie Moronga, where she sang and acted.

In 2017, Martínez launched her first album as a singer Sad Songs from my Happy Heart.

In 2020, she launched a podcast, Cooking in Mexican from A to Z, on Heritage Radio Network. Co-hosted with her son, Chef Aarón Sánchez, the show explores the food, flavors, and history of Mexico through lively conversations with their guests.

In 2021, "In a Taste for Life with Zarela¨, she shares her inspirational "building blocks" for living well with Parkinson's disease (PD) and for healthy and delicious eating.

== Awards and accolades ==
- Best International Book of the Year for Food from My Heart: Cuisines of Mexico Remembered and Reimagined, The James Beard Foundation (1993, nominated)
- Who's Who of American Food Professionals, James Beard Foundation (2013)

== Personal life ==
Zarela lives in New York City. Her son Aarón Sánchez is the co-star of the television shows Chopped, Heat Seekers and guest chef at MasterChef season 7 and the chef/owner of the restaurant Johnny Sanchez, in New Orleans, Louisiana. Her son Rodrigo is a lawyer. Zarela has two grandsons and a granddaughter.

In 2004, Martínez was diagnosed with Parkinson's disease, triggered by an accident in which she was hit by a taxi cab. She was the partner of pornographic filmmaker and actor Jamie Gillis from 2003 until his death in 2010.
