= Karine Bakhoum =

Egyptian consultant

Karine Bakhoum is a restaurant public relations consultant. She has also appeared many times as a judge on the Food Network television show Iron Chef America.

== Career ==
Karine Bakhoum is an active NAACP member specialized in lifestyle, hospitality public relations, consulting and media networking.

Bakhoum has appeared on culinary reality television shows including Iron Chef America, Unique Eats, and Worst Cooks in America.
