= 3 Days to Open with Bobby Flay =

American reality cooking show

- Genre: Reality television Cooking show
- Starring: Bobby Flay
- Country of origin: United States
- Original language: English
- No. of seasons: 1
- No. of episodes: 6

Production
- Producer: Rock Shrimp Productions
- Running time: 42 minutes

Original release
- Network: Food Network
- Release: July 15 – August 17, 2012

3 Days to Open with Bobby Flay is an American reality cooking show aired on the Food Network. The series debuted on July 15, 2012. In the series, Bobby Flay visits new restaurants that will be opening three days from his arrival. He makes a list of things that he thinks need to be fixed by opening night, and spends those three days preparing the owners for opening, and attempting to check every concern off his list.

== Episodes ==
No.	Title	Original release date
1	"Secret Recipe for Disaster"	July 15, 2012
Restaurant: Licari's Sicilian Pizza Kitchen in Grand Rapids, Michigan
2	"Melt Mobile Meltdown"	July 20, 2012
Restaurant: Melt Mobile in Stamford, Connecticut
3	"A Sticky Situation"	July 27, 2012
Restaurant: Sticky's in New York City, New York
4	"Havoc in Harlem"	August 3, 2012
Restaurant: Cove Lounge in New York City, New York
5	"Big Guys Big Problems"	August 10, 2012
Restaurant: Big Guy Sausage Stand in Berwyn, Illinois
6	"Confections of a Rock Star"	August 17, 2012
Restaurant: Confections of a Rock$tar in Asbury Park, New Jersey
