= Kelsey Nixon =

American cook and television personality

- Born: North Ogden, Utah
- Education: Brigham Young University – BA '07 Le Cordon Bleu – Hollywood
- Culinary career
- Television shows: Kelsey's Essentials; Kelsey's Homemade
- Website: http://www.kelseynixon.com

Kelsey Nixon is an American cook and television personality. In 2008, she came in fourth place on the fourth season of the Food Network series Food Network Star. She hosted the Cooking Channel series Kelsey's Essentials, which ran for five seasons from 2010 to 2013. In 2015 she hosted the show Kelsey's Homemade, again on the Cooking Channel, which ran for one season.

== Early life and career ==
Kelsey Nixon attended Brigham Young University with a degree in Broadcast Journalism. While she was still in college, she created her own cooking show, Kelsey’s Kitchen, eventually hosting and producing 100 episodes over 2 years. After graduating, she then earned a professional culinary arts degree at Le Cordon Bleu – Hollywood, and later received additional training at the French Culinary Institute. She also interned at Martha Stewart Living and The Food Network series, Semi-Homemade with Sandra Lee.

== Television ==
Nixon was voted "fan favorite" and finished in fourth place in the fourth season of the Food Network series Food Network Star.

Kelsey's Essentials premiered on November 6, 2010, on the Cooking Channel, a sister network of Food Network. It ran for five seasons, until 2013. Nixon received a 2013 Daytime Emmy nomination in the Outstanding Culinary Host Category.

In 2015 she hosted the Cooking Channel show Kelsey's Homemade, which ran for six episodes.

== Personal life ==
Nixon married Robby Egan in 2008 and gave birth to a son, Oliver, on June 24, 2012. Nixon and Egan had a second son, Leo Ezra Egan, in March 2015, who was born prematurely and died soon after. Nixon and her husband welcomed a baby girl, Nora Elizabeth, born on November 21, 2016, via gestational surrogate. Their fourth child, Penelope Kathryn, was born in 2020 also via surrogate.
