= Alex García (chef) =

Cuban American chef

Alex García is a Cuban American chef who helped popularize a version of Cuban food at several New York City restaurants and on the Food Network. Born in Havana, García attended Northeastern University in Massachusetts where he earned a degree in hotel and restaurant management. García later attended the Culinary Institute of America, and Florida International University. He worked alongside chef Douglas Rodriguez for four years at Yuca restaurant in Miami. García's work in New York has included stints on the Food Network in Soho, Babalu, Patria, and Calle Ocho.

García's first cookbook, In a Cuban Kitchen (ISBN 0-7624-1541-X ), was published in September 2004 in the United States and in England. His career suffered a setback in 2003 when he was indicted in federal district court in Brooklyn and charged with conspiracy and money laundering. García was found guilty of money laundering, but served no time. In 2007 García was the consulting chef at a new restaurant called Carniceria on Smith Street, Brooklyn, as well as the Gaucho Steak Company, a themed South American fast food outlet in Hells Kitchen.

Currently Chef Alex Garcia is the Director of Culinary Operations for Barrio Foods and leads the Barrio Foods catering business, MAMBO catering. Chef Garcia not only created the culinary programs but also oversees the kitchens at a number of his properties throughout New York City including Calle Ocho, the Copacabana Supper Club, the VIP food service at the Copacabana Nightclub, Barrio, Havana Café, Havana Room, Open Book Café at the Brooklyn Public Library, Cabana Bar and Rooftop 760. In 2011, became the executive chef of Babalu Restaurant and Lounge in the Throgs Neck section of the Bronx.

Chef Garcia recently launched a range of authentic Spanish cookware products called Culinary Habana, and as founder of The Spice Company, he develops spice blends available for wholesale and retail purchase throughout New York City and the Caribbean.
