= Kelsey's Essentials =

American food reality television series

- Genre: Cooking show; Food reality television
- Presented by: Kelsey Nixon
- Country of origin: United States
- Original language: English
- No. of seasons: 6
- No. of episodes: 69 (list of episodes)

Production
- Running time: 22:00
- Production company: Rock Shrimp Productions

Original release
- Network: Cooking Channel
- Release: November 6, 2010 – December 14, 2016

Kelsey's Essentials is an American cooking show that aired on Cooking Channel. It was presented by chef Kelsey Nixon, who came to prominence as a contestant on the fourth season of the Food Network series Food Network Star. The series featured Nixon teaching viewers how to cook and follow recipes "with confidence" and by utilizing "essential" kitchen utensils.

Kelsey's Essentials premiered on November 6, 2010, and concluded on December 14, 2016, after six seasons.
