= Cheap Eats =

American television series

- Genre: Reality
- Presented by: Ali Khan
- No. of seasons: 5
- No. of episodes: 59

Production
- Producer: Ali Khan
- Production company: Sirens Media

Original release
- Network: Cooking Channel
- Release: September 22, 2015 – November 7, 2018

Cheap Eats is a food travelogue television series on Cooking Channel. Ali Khan, author of the blog Bang for Your Burger Buck, is the host (and co-executive producer). Each episode is in a different city in the US where, within 12 hours, Khan finds great deals at restaurants for breakfast, lunch, a snack, and dinner — on a budget of only $35. Sometimes Ali breaks the budget, but he only ever exceeds it by a few dollars.

== Season 1 ==
| episode number | city | synopsis |
|---|---|---|
| CCALI-101H | Minneapolis | Ali visits Hell's Kitchen for a taste of their sausage bread, takes on some authentic goat tacos, visits a tater tot food truck and ends his day with at acclaimed burger restaurant Red Cow |
| CCALI-102H | Austin | Ali starts his day with an Austin staple: breakfast tacos before tracking down some BBQ on wheels, a decadent blondie and chicken sausage gumbo straight from a Cajun Grandmother's cookbook |
| CCALI-103H | Boulder | Ali Khan hits the ground running in Boulder at a diner with pancakes so manly, only a chef who moonlights as a strong man could make them. Then he seeks out some of the most authentic Chinese noodles found on the West Coast and finishes his day at a Boulder staple with a soulfully-crafted shrimp po' boy, accompanied by one of the best views in the city. |
| CCALI-104H | Chicago | Ali Khan's Windy City expectations are as high as Chicago's Willis Tower, so his breakfast is a tower of fried chicken, biscuits, egg and bacon. For lunch, Ali dives into the city's unofficial sandwich, the Italian beef. He scores a killer chocolate almond croissant at a bakery with a child baker protege and brings down the house with a unique mac and cheese with a gourmet twist. |
| CCALI-105H | Miami | Ali Khan travels to Miami and breaks his fast with a classic Cuban staple: empanadas. He then samples some fruits of the sea, with right-off-the-boat mahi mahi sandwiches and a fisherman's stew. He closes out the day with a Latin-Middle-Eastern-American fusion bowl that could only come from Miami. |
| CCALI-106H | Albuquerque | The Land of Enchantment's newest resident is looking for a taste of the Southwest on the cheap and he is willing to go venture to new ground like vegan waffles, hatch green chile cheeseburgers, spicy bacon donuts before settling down with a New Mexican classic: Carne Adovada. |
| CCALI-107H | Charleston | Ali is in one of his favorite food cities ever but this time he is on the strict budget. That means deals on breakfast grits with every breakfast meat in the book, out of this world crab cakes, the most decadent hushpuppies ever and then he tempts fate and his budget with a full on plate of Carolina style BBQ |

== Season 2 ==
| episode number | city | synopsis |
|---|---|---|
| CCALI-201H | Pittsburgh | Pit Stop. Ali rolls up his blue collar sleeves and works on his Pittsburghese. He visits a charming neighborhood cafe for lemon ricotta pancakes before hitting up a celebrated sub shop. He twists up a vintage snack before visiting one of the hottest restaurants in town for a south of the border supper that's legit to his lips. |
| CCALI-202H | Baltimore | Bayside Bites. In Baltimore, Ali Khan comes face-to-face with bacon-infused pancakes fit for "the king," then channels his inner Neanderthal for his first taste of Maryland pit beef. It's a fancy snack of Basque-style fried cheese balls before he slurps down on some out-of-this-world Korean-style street noodles. |
| CCALI-203H | Richmond | Fillin' up the South. Ali Khan hits the ground running in Richmond, Va., at a bakery that puts a spicy twist on a traditional Southern biscuit. Then he heads to a diner for a curry-inspired, country omelet before brewing up a chocolate cake with coffee. But a visit to Richmond isn't complete without a soul food dinner of fried catfish. |
| CCALI-204H | Bozeman | Big Sky, Big Game, Big Flavor! Ali Khan's expedition for the best deals in Bozeman, Mont., begins with farm-to-table fresh Benedict and summer sausage before hunting down a made-from-scratch elk burger. Then he discovers a celebrity-approved huckleberry bar. But his journey isn't complete until he sinks his teeth into a bison pepperoni pizza. |
| CCALI-205H | Jackson Hole | Mountain Feast. Ali Khan hits the Jackson Hole, Wyo., trail running for a delicious croque madame with mornay sauce in the morning and crosses the Snake River for a crunchy fried chicken banh mi sandwich. Then, he discovers a berry cheesecake doughnut before stirring up a hearty bowl of spicy pork rice. |
| CCALI-206H | Salt Lake City | Crossroads Foodie. Ali Khan paves the way in Salt Lake City with a zesty pound cake-inspired French toast, then gets wasted on a burger topped with fried guacamole. A biker bar sends him to heaven with a Utah staple, fried Mormon funeral potatoes, and he ends his day with a smoky chicken club of perfection. |
| CCALI-207H | Grand Rapids | Great Lakes Craves. Ali Khan digs into the best deals in Grand Rapids with a twilight French toast glistening with creamy anglaise sauce. For lunch, it's a Mexican fiesta with layers of juicy pork torta de jamon. He snacks on spicy Moroccan chicken wings and finishes the day right with a craveable double-patty blue cheese-stuffed burger. |
| CCALI-208H | Indianapolis | Full Throttle Yum. Ali Khan is off to the races in Indianapolis with a decadent sourdough sugar pearl waffle breakfast, then gets his authentic deli lunch on with a house-cured sausage sandwich that's to die for. A vegan key-lime cheesecake has his name all over it for a snack, and he ends his day with one of the best breaded pork tenderloin sandwiches in town. |
| CCALI-209H | Louisville | Cream of the Crop. Ali Khan starts his day in Louisville, Ky., by cutting into a towering stack of thick hot chocolate pancakes. Lunchtime in Louisville means a saucy Mata Hari hot brown. He snacks his way to apple brandied pie heaven and finishes strong with a glorious Southern fried chicken and sweet potato waffles. |
| CCALI-210H | Chattanooga | All aboard in Chat-town. Ali Khan is looking for the best deals in Chattanooga, starting with a glorious colossal cinnamon roll before he digs into an out-of-this-world sweet and sassy lamb burger for lunch. He snacks on an indulgent Tennessee whiskey pot de creme and then an Irish spin on tacos for dinner. |
| CCALI-211H | Omaha | Culinary Cornhuskers. Ali Khan starts his Omaha food adventure with breakfast from a fast made-from-scratch joint offering a crazy good egg boat with hash browns. For lunch, Ali tips his hat to an iconic Omaha lunch with a housemade Reuben. A butter brickle ice cream cone holds him over before his dinner of pork ragu meatballs. |
| CCALI-212H | Des Moines | Far from the Farm. Ali Khan starts his day in Des Moines the way Iowans do, with crisp and cheesy breakfast nachos. Then it's onto a roasted chicken lunch with comforting mashed potatoes and onion rings, before snacking on a truly divine Napoleon. For dinner, Ali has an unexpected and luxurious seafood stew. |
| CCALI-213H | St. Louis | Homerun Barbecue. Ali Khan is in St. Louis looking for the best deals for breakfast, lunch, dinner and a snack. First up to bat is a slider piled high with pulled pork and chorizo chili. For lunch under the arch, it's a jail cell pork belly BLT. Ali escapes for a delicious part brownie, part cookie treat, and ends the day with a pitmaster's grand slam: crunchy cranberry cayenne torched chicken. |
