= FoodCrafters =

- Starring: Aida Mollenkamp
- Country of origin: United States

Production
- Running time: 30 minutes

Original release
- Network: Cooking Channel
- Release: May 31, 2010 – present

FoodCrafters is a food and travel show on the Cooking Channel hosted by Aida Mollenkamp. The show debuted on May 31, 2010, and aired on Tuesday evenings on the Cooking Channel. FoodCrafters is produced for Cooking Channel by Citizen Pictures.
