= Will Work for Food (TV series) =

- Starring: Adam Gertler
- Country of origin: United States
- No. of episodes: 13

Production
- Producer: Authentic Entertainment
- Running time: 30 minutes

Original release
- Network: Food Network

Related
- The Next Food Network Star (Season 4)

Will Work for Food is a Food Network show starring Adam Gertler, one of three finalists of the fourth season of The Next Food Network Star. The show premiered on Monday, January 19, 2009 at 8:30 PM EDT. According to Food Network, the series "exposes Adam to the world of little-known food jobs as he fearlessly puts his life – and mouth – on the line to try them all! Whether taking honey from three million bees, sculpting ice with a chain saw, foraging for truffles, or digging a wine cave, Adam will do anything in the name of food." The concept is somewhat similar to the Food Network program Glutton for Punishment. In each episode, Gertler featured two food related jobs.

== Episodes ==
Season 1
#	Title
01	"Lobsterman and Beekeeper"
02	"Caviar Producer and Goat Farmer"
03	"Giant Clam Farmer and Flair Bartender"
04	"1830s Chef and Wine Angel"
05	"BBQ Pitmaster and Competitive Eater"
06	"Benihana Chef and Abalone Farmer"
07	"Pizza Tosser and Cider Maker"
08	"Cranberry Harvester and Ice Sculptor"
09	"Wine Cave Digger and Oyster Harvester"
10	"Pheasant Farmer and Food Stylist"
11	"Ice Cream Franchise and Fish Filleter"
12	"Chocolate Dress Maker and Dog Food Chef"
13	"Truffle Forager and Food Make-Up Artist"
