= Food: Fact or Fiction? =

- Genre: Food reality television
- Created by: David Isser
- Starring: Michael McKean
- Country of origin: United States
- Original language: English
- No. of seasons: 4
- No. of episodes: 65

Production
- Executive producers: David Isser, Megan Parlen-Isser, James Younger, Lori McCreary
- Editors: David Isser, Kazem Roghani, Tippy Lapin
- Running time: 22:00
- Production company: Revelations Entertainment

Original release
- Network: Cooking Channel
- Release: October 26, 2015 – June 4, 2019

Food: Fact or Fiction? is an American food-themed television series that airs on Cooking Channel. It is presented by actor Michael McKean. The series features McKean discussing the history of different foods and then breaking down whether common beliefs about the history of those foods are indeed factual.

Food: Fact or Fiction? officially premiered on October 26, 2015.

== Episodes ==
=== Season 1 ===
No.	Title	Original air date
1	"What's for Dessert" (Note: "What's for Dessert" was produced as the second episode of the first season, but it aired as the pilot episode.)	October 26, 2015
2	"Passport's Please!" (Note: "Passport's Please!" was produced as the third episode of the first season, but it aired as the second episode of the season.)	November 2, 2015
3	"Doctor's Note" (Note: "Doctor's Note" was produced as the pilot episode, but it aired as the third episode of the first season.)	November 9, 2015
4	"Breakfast" (Note: "Breakfast" was produced as the fifth episode of the first season and "Taste of War" was produced as the fourth episode of the season, but the episodes aired in reverse order.)	November 16, 2015
5	"Taste of War"	November 23, 2015
6	"Hungry for Love"	November 30, 2015

=== Season 2 ===
No.	Title	Original air date
1	"Hole in One" (Note: "Hole in One" was produced as the second episode of the second season, but it aired as the first episode of the season.)	October 24, 2016
2	"The Kitchen of Good and Evil" (Note: "The Kitchen of Good and Evil" was produced as the ninth episode of the second season, but it aired as the second episode of the season.)	October 31, 2016
3	"Hungry Eyes" (Note: "Hungry Eyes" was produced as the fifth episode of the second season, but it aired as the third episode of the season.)	November 7, 2016
4	"Thanksgiving Winners" (Note: "Thanksgiving Winners" was produced as the eighth episode of the second season and "Power Couples" was produced as the fourth episode of the season, but the episodes aired in reverse order.)	November 14, 2016
5	"Breadly Combinations" (Note: "Breadly Combinations" was produced as the seventh episode of the second season, but it aired as the fifth episode of the season.)	November 21, 2016
6	"Eat Your Words" (Note: "Eat Your Words" was produced as the tenth episode of the second season, but it aired as the sixth episode of the season.)	November 28, 2016
7	"Rags to Riches" (Note: "Rags to Riches" was produced as the third episode of the second season, but it aired as the seventh episode of the season.)	December 5, 2016
8	"Power Couples"	December 12, 2016
9	"Some Like It Hot" (Note: "Some Like It Hot" was produced as the first episode of the second season, but it aired as the ninth episode of the season.)	December 19, 2016
10	"State Fare" (Note: "State Fare" was produced as the twelfth episode of the second season, but it aired as the tenth episode of the season.)	December 26, 2016
11	"Eat to Win" (Note: "Eat to Win" was produced as the sixth episode of the second season, but it aired as the eleventh episode of the season.)	January 2, 2017
12	"Carnie Knowledge" (Note: "Carnie Knowledge" was produced as the thirteenth episode of the second season, but it aired as the twelfth episode of the season.)	January 9, 2017
13	"Up in the Air" (Note: "Up in the Air" was produced as the eleventh episode of the second season, but it aired as the thirteenth episode of the season.)	January 16, 2017

=== Season 3 ===
No.	Title	Original air date
1	"Sacred Chow" (Note: "Sacred Chow" was produced as the second episode of the third season, but it aired as the first episode of the season.)	October 22, 2017
2	"Disastrous Dishes" (Note: "Disastrous Dishes" was produced as the third episode of the third season, but it aired as the second episode of the season.)	October 29, 2017
3	"Opposites Attract" (Note: "Opposites Attract" was produced as the first episode of the third season, but it aired as the firstepisode of the season.)	November 5, 2017
4	"Bloodlines"	November 12, 2017
5	"Name That Dish"	November 19, 2017
6	"Nifty Fifties"	November 26, 2017
7	"Seasons Eatings" (Note: "Seasons Eatings" was produced as the eighth episode of the third season, but it aired as the seventh episode of the season.)	December 3, 2017
8	"The Book of Food" (Note: "The Book of Food" was produced as the ninth episode of the third season, but it aired as the eighth episode of the season.)	December 10, 2017
9	"The Takeaway" (Note: "The Takeaway" was produced as the seventh episode of the third season, but it aired as the ninth episode of the season.)	December 24, 2017
10	"Sounds Delicious"	December 31, 2017
11	"The Shape of Things"	January 7, 2018
12	"Diner Delights"	January 14, 2018
13	"Rainbow Connections"	January 21, 2018
14	"Street Foods"	January 28, 2018
15	"Crime Biters"	February 4, 2018
16	"Wedding Chows"	April 8, 2018
17	"Biting Words" (Note: "Biting Words" was produced as the nineteenth episode of the third season and "Townie Treats" was produced as the seventeenth episode of the season, but the episodes aired in reverse order.)	April 15, 2018
18	"Declassifried"	April 22, 2018
19	"Townie Treats"	April 29, 2018
20	"Gone Camping"	May 6, 2018

=== Season 4 ===
No.	Title	Original air date
1	"Brunch Beauties" (Note: "Brunch Beauties"was produced as the second episode of the third season, but it aired as the first episode of the season.)	October 1, 2018
2	"Happy Birthday"	October 8, 2018
3	"Game Night"	October 15, 2018
4	"Wicked Good"	October 22, 2018
5	"Baked Goodies"	November 1, 2018
6	"I'm Stuffed"	November 8, 2018
7	"Dishes in Disguise"	November 15, 2018
8	"Finger Foods"	November 19, 2018
9	"Santa's Sweet Tooth"	December 6, 2018
10	"Gadgets and Gizmos"	December 13, 2018
11	"Dip It Good"	January 24, 2019
12	"Vegas, Baby!"	January 31, 2019
13	"War and Peace"	February 13, 2019
14	"Play with Your Food"	February 14, 2019
15	"Bon Appetit"	February 21, 2019
16	"Tea Time"	February 28, 2019
17	"Into the Wild"	March 7, 2019
18	"Paradise Nosh"	April 15, 2019
19	"My Kind of Town"	March 21, 2019
20	"Deli-Licious"	April 22, 2019
21	"Fire in the Hole"	May 6, 2019
22	"Potlucky"	May 13, 2019
23	"Tasting Is Believing"	May 20, 2019
24	"Layers of Flavors"	April 29, 2019
25	"Summertime"	May 27, 2019
26	"Backyard BBQ"	June 3, 2019
