= Dessert First with Anne Thornton =

American food reality television series

- Also known as: Dessert First
- Genre: Cooking show; Food reality television
- Presented by: Anne Thornton
- Country of origin: United States
- Original language: English
- No. of seasons: 2
- No. of episodes: 19

Production
- Running time: 22:00
- Production company: Meetinghouse Productions

Original release
- Network: Food Network
- Release: October 24, 2010 – June 25, 2011

Dessert First with Anne Thornton (Note: Although the series' intertitle simply states Dessert First, the title of the series on the official website is listed as Dessert First with Anne Thornton.) is an American cooking show that aired on Food Network, and was presented by pastry chef Anne Thornton. The series featured Thornton demonstrating how to prepare different desserts and pastries.

The series premiered on October 24, 2010. The second season premiered on April 2, 2011 and concluded on June 25, 2011. The series was cancelled after two seasons after it was reported that several of Thornton's recipes featured on the series were plagiarized from other chefs, including fellow Food Network chef Ina Garten.

== Episodes ==
=== Season 1 ===
| No. | Title | Original air date | Production code |
|---|---|---|---|
| 1 | "Scary Sweet" (Note: "Scary Sweet" was produced as the sixth episode of the first season, but it aired as the pilot episode.) | October 24, 2010 | TBA |
| 2 | "Breakfast Sweets" (Note: "Breakfast Sweets" was produced as the fifth episode of the first season, but it aired as the second episode of the season.) | October 31, 2010 | TBA |
| 3 | "Caramel" | November 7, 2010 | TBA |
| 4 | "Thanksgiving Desserts" (Note: "Thanksgiving Desserts" was produced as the second episode of the first season, but it aired as the fourth episode of the season.) | November 14, 2010 | TBA |
| 5 | "Fried Desserts" (Note: "Fried Desserts" was produced as the pilot episode, but it aired as the fifth episode of the season.) | November 21, 2010 | TBA |
| 6 | "Anne's Christmas" (Note: "Anne's Christmas" was produced as the fourth episode of the first season, but it aired as the sixth episode of the season.) | December 5, 2010 | TBA |

=== Season 2 ===
| No. | Title | Original air date | Production code |
|---|---|---|---|
| 1 | "Sweet Side of Brunch" (Note: "Sweet Side of Brunch" was produced as the fourth episode of the second season, but it aired as the first episode of the season.) | April 2, 2011 | TBA |
| 2 | "Fancy Finale" (Note: "Fancy Finale" was produced as the sixth episode of the second season, but it aired as the second episode of the season.) | April 9, 2011 | TBA |
| 3 | "Springtime Sweets" (Note: "Springtime Sweets" was produced as the second episode of the second season, but it aired as the third episode of the season.) | April 16, 2011 | TBA |
| 4 | "Pudding Party" (Note: "Pudding Party" was produced as the eighth episode of the second season, but it aired as the fourth episode of the season.) | April 23, 2011 | TBA |
| 5 | "Whipping Up Meringues" (Note: "Whipping Up Meringues" was produced as the twelfth episode of the second season, but it aired as the fifth episode of the season.) | April 30, 2011 | TBA |
| 6 | "Blue Ribbon Pies" (Note: "Blue Ribbon Pies" was produced as the third episode of the second season, but it aired as the sixth episode of the season.) | May 7, 2011 | TBA |
| 7 | "Chocolate Indulgence" (Note: "Chocolate Indulgence" was produced as the eleventh episode of the second season, but it aired as the seventh episode of the season.) | May 14, 2011 | TBA |
| 8 | "Ultimate Chocolate Cakes" (Note: "Ultimate Chocolate Cakes" was produced as the first episode of the second season, but it aired as the eighth episode of the season.) | May 21, 2011 | TBA |
| 9 | "Chocolate Chip Comfort" (Note: "Chocolate Chip Comfort" was produced as the tenth episode of the second season and "Raise the Dessert Bar" was produced as the ninth episode of the season, but the episodes aired in reverse order.) | May 28, 2011 | TBA |
| 10 | "Raise the Dessert Bar" | June 4, 2011 | TBA |
| 11 | "Rock 'n' Roll Retro Cakes and Shakes" (Note: "Rock 'n' Roll Retro Cakes and Shakes" was produced as the thirteenth episode of the second season, but it aired as the eleventh episode of the season.) | June 11, 2011 | TBA |
| 12 | "Mini Desserts" (Note: "Mini Desserts" was produced as the seventh episode of the second season, but it aired as the twelfth episode of the season.) | June 18, 2011 | TBA |
| 13 | "Brownie Bonanza" (Note: "Brownie Bonanza" was produced as the fifth episode of the second season, but it aired as the thirteenth episode of the season.) | June 25, 2011 | TBA |
