= Unwrapped 2.0 =

American food-themed television series

- Genre: Food reality television
- Presented by: Alfonso Ribeiro
- Country of origin: United States
- Original language: English
- No. of seasons: 3
- No. of episodes: 39

Production
- Producer: Lusid Media
- Running time: 22:00

Original release
- Network: Food Network (February–September 2015); Cooking Channel (October 2015–January 2017)
- Release: February 2, 2015 – January 8, 2017

Related
- Unwrapped

Unwrapped 2.0 is an American food-themed television series that aired on Cooking Channel. It is presented by actor Alfonso Ribeiro; and it is a revival of the 2001–2011 series Unwrapped, which was hosted by Marc Summers. The series aired on Food Network during its first season.

== Episodes ==
=== Season 1 (2015) ===
No.	Title	Original air date
1	"Southern Treats"	February 2, 2015
2	"Sweet & Sour"	February 9, 2015
3	"Let It Roll"	February 16, 2015
4	"Family Recipes"	February 23, 2015
5	"Game Day Munchies"	March 2, 2015
6	"Secret Center"	March 9, 2015
7	"Go Nuts"	March 16, 2015
8	"Cheese Glorious Cheese"	March 23, 2015
9	"Candy Critters"	March 30, 2015
10	"Rise and Dine"	April 6, 2015
11	"Colorful Candies"	April 13, 2015
12	"Fruits and Veggies"	April 20, 2015
13	"Melting Pot"	April 27, 2015

=== Season 2 (2015–2016) ===
No.	Title	Original air date
1 (14)	"Movie Munchies"	October 10, 2015
2 (15)	"Crunchy"	October 10, 2015
3 (16)	"Barbecue Sides"	October 17, 2015
4 (17)	"Can't Eat Just One"	October 24, 2015
5 (18)	"Flavor Infusion"	October 31, 2015
6 (19)	"Savor the Flavor"	November 7, 2015
7 (20)	"Nostalgic Eats"	November 14, 2015
8 (21)	"Festive Foods"	December 7, 2015
9 (22)	"Snack Bar"	December 12, 2015
10 (23)	"Play with Your Food"	December 19, 2015
11 (24)	"Sticky Situation"	January 18, 2016
12 (25)	"Love is in the Air"	February 8, 2016
13 (26)	"Global Goodies!"	February 15, 2016

=== Season 3 (2016–2017) ===
No.	Title	Original air date
1 (27)	"Backyard Barbecue"	October 9, 2016
2 (28)	"Local Legends"	October 16, 2016
3 (29)	"Tongue Twister"	October 23, 2016
4 (30)	"Layers of Flavors"	October 30, 2016
5 (31)	"Inside Job"	November 6, 2016
6 (32)	"It's a Rainbow"	November 13, 2016
7 (33)	"Sweet Sensations"	November 20, 2016
8 (34)	"Freaky Flavors"	November 27, 2016
9 (35)	"Pop Stars"	December 4, 2016
10 (36)	"Little Bits"	December 11, 2016
11 (37)	"Farm Fresh"	December 18, 2016
12 (38)	"Quick Fix"	January 1, 2017
13 (39)	"Simple Goodness"	January 8, 2017
