= Anne Thornton =

American pastry chef and food writer (born 1981)

- Born: June 16, 1981 (age 45); San Antonio, Texas, United States
- Education: Miami University; Institute of Culinary Education
- Culinary career
- Television show: Dessert First with Anne Thornton

Anne Thornton (born June 16, 1981) is an American pastry chef and food writer who came to prominence as the host of the Food Network television series Dessert First with Anne Thornton.

== Early life and education ==
Thornton was born in San Antonio, Texas but raised in Cleveland, Ohio. She graduated from Magnificat High School (in Rocky River, Ohio) in 1999. Thornton attended Miami University in Oxford, Ohio and obtained degrees in philosophy and finance. She then moved to New York City and enrolled in the Institute of Culinary Education, where she obtained a degree in culinary arts.

== Career ==
Thornton's first culinary job was in culinary media production. She then worked as a personal chef before joining the New York restaurant The Waverly Inn in 2006, where she was employed as a pastry chef and assistant general manager.

In 2009, Thornton moved to New York restaurant, Hotel Griffou, where she worked as executive pastry chef and event coordinator until June 2010.

Thornton gained the attention of Food Network after she presented her salted caramel banana pudding pie at the 2009 New York Wine & Food Festival. Her own cooking show was then developed, Dessert First with Anne Thornton, which aired from 2010 to 2011.

== Controversy ==
After the conclusion of Dessert First with Anne Thornton, news outlets reported that several of Thornton's recipes had been plagiarized from other chefs, with many recipes purportedly stolen from Martha Stewart and fellow Food Network chef Ina Garten. In an interview with Today on February 16, 2012, Thornton addressed the allegations by stating: "I get inspiration from all my heroes [...] of course there will be similarities."
