= Unwrapped =

Television series

- Genre: Cooking
- Presented by: Marc Summers
- Country of origin: United States
- Original language: English
- No. of seasons: 22
- No. of episodes: 341

Production
- Executive producers: Jim Berger; Jennifer Darrow; Duke Hartman; Sonny Hutchison; Chris Wheeler
- Producer: Tim McOsker
- Production locations: Hershey, Pennsylvania; Orlando, Florida; Pueblo, Colorado
- Cinematography: Jeremy Osbern; Jeff Doser; Richard Gretzinger; Jeff Schirmer; John Cummings
- Editors: Vicki Gratz; David Green; Richard Webster
- Running time: 30 minutes to 1 hour
- Production company: High Noon Productions

Original release
- Network: Food Network
- Release: June 1, 2001 – May 28, 2011

Related
- Unwrapped 2.0

Unwrapped, also known as Unwrapped with Marc Summers, is an American television program on Food Network that reveals the origins of sponsored foods. It first aired in June 2001 and is hosted by Marc Summers. The show leads viewers on tours of factories and other food-related locations. Popular subjects include candy, breakfast cereal, snacks, and TV dinners. The show's spin-off, Trivia Unwrapped, is a game show also hosted by Marc Summers. In February 2015, a revival series, Unwrapped 2.0, began airing; it's hosted by Alfonso Ribeiro.

== Overview ==
The show tapes segments with Marc Summers at many different locations across the country. Some host segment locations are: The Notz Landing Diner located in Golden, Colorado at the Heritage Square Amusement Park; The Drugstore in Pueblo, Colorado; locations within Elitch Gardens Amusement Park in Denver; and a specially built set at the Comcast Media Center near Denver.

The show is produced by the Colorado production company High Noon Productions for Food Network. Since 2006, new episodes of Unwrapped have been presented in high definition on Food Network HD.

Volume 1 of the show has been released to a three-DVD set.

Marc Silverstein hosted several 1-hour Unwrapped specials (later remade with Summers).

All seasons are available for streaming on Max as of August 2025.

== Episodes ==
Season 1 (21 Episodes)
Episode	Title	Description
1	Party Snacks	Marc Summers takes a closer look at party snacks.
2	Ice Cream Toppings	Learn about Bosco Chocolate Syrup, chocolate sprinkles, maraschino cherries, the perfect banana split, and the inventor of the smoosh-in.
3	French Fries	Look at the history of the Idaho potato. Then visit one of the largest makers of fries and tater tots, taste some real Belgian fries in New York, tour the Heinz factory and sample Arby's curly fries.
4	Hamburgers	Learn the hamburger sandwich origins, explore the secrets of the big chains Wendy's, White Castle, and McDonald's. Take a pickle trip to a Vlasic Pickles factory. Visit the Louis' Lunch, the restaurant that claims to be the inventor of the hamburger.
5	Candy Bars	
6	Movie Candy	
7	Bubble Gum	
8	Cookies	
9	Chocolate Candy	
10	Cereal	
11	Crazy Drinks	
12	Beer	
13	Breakfast Food	
14	Coffee	
15	Frozen Novelties	
16	Retro Candy	
17	Peanut Butter	
18	Lunchbox Treats	
19	Lollipops	
20	I Dare You Candy	
21	Fruity Snacks	

Season 2 (21 Episodes)
Episode	Title	Description
1	Penny Candy	
2	Melting Pot	
3	Food Prizes	
4	Fudge	
5	Hot Stuff	
6	Dessert in a Box	
7	Movie Snacks	
8	Pizza	
9	Cocktails	
10	Retro	
11	Chocolate Covered	
12	Energy Boosts	
13	Stadium Snax	
14	Carnivals Unwrapped	
15	Minty Treats	
16	Chewy Gooey Treats	
17	Oldies bit Goodies	
18	Chips	
20	Sandwiches	
21	Drive-Ins	

Season 3
Episode	Title
1	Midnight Snax
2	Vending Machines
3	Hidden Treasures
4	Fun and Games
5	Bizzaro Foods
6	Hold Everything
7	Quick Snax
8	Dips and Dippers
9	Soda Fountains
10	Mini Mouthfuls
11	Edibles
12	Crazy Colors
13	Food Fanatics
14	TV Dinners
15	Weddings
16	Canned Food
17	Appetizers
18	Sugary Treats
19	Faux French
