= Café Boulud =

French restaurant in New York City

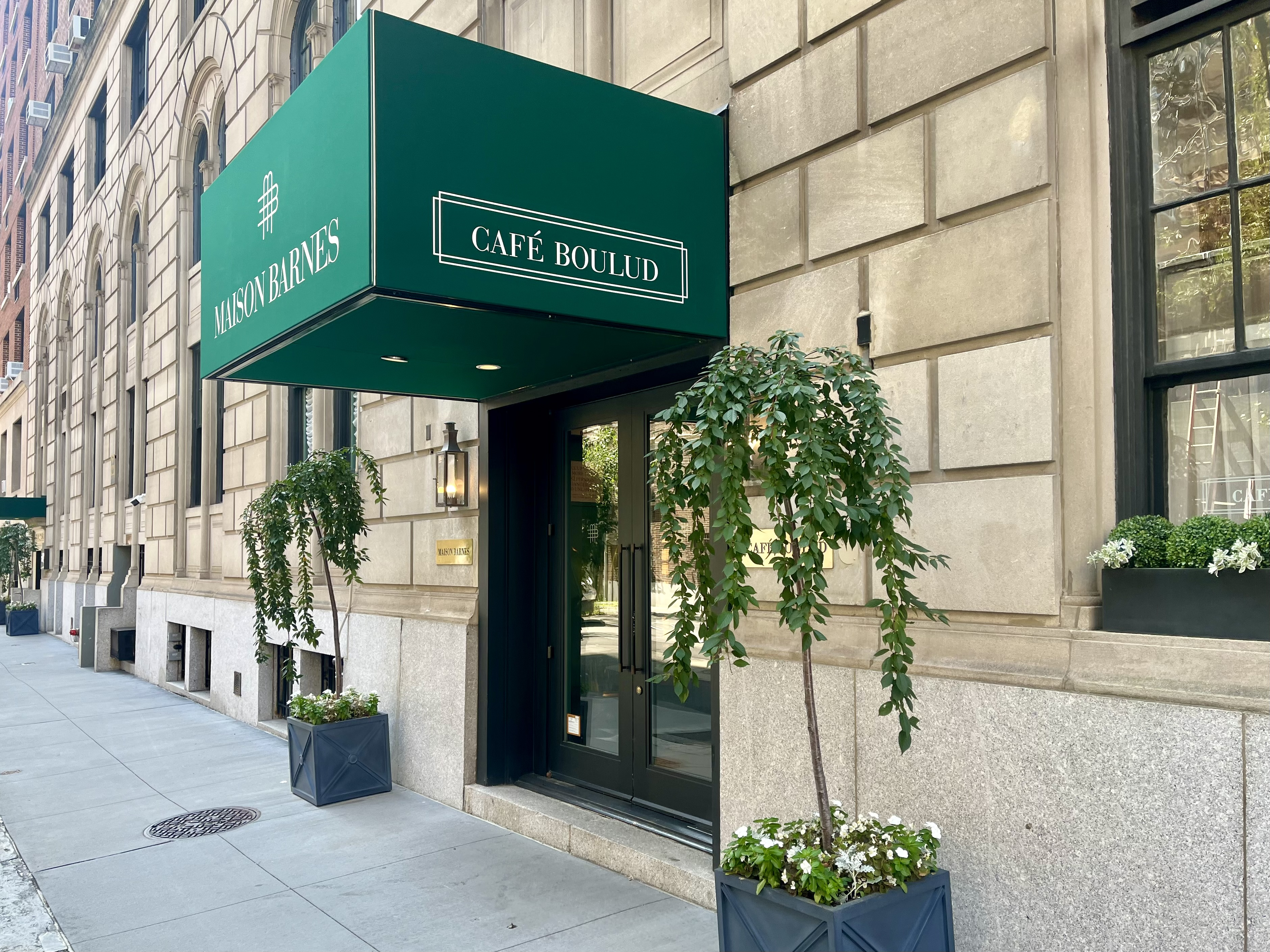
- The restaurant's exterior in 2024
- Interactive map of Café Boulud

Restaurant information
- Established: 1998; 28 years ago
- Owner: Daniel Boulud
- Chef: Romain Paumier
- Food type: French
- Rating: (Michelin Guide)
- Location: 100 East 63rd Street, New York City, New York, 10065, United States
- Coordinates: 40°45′54″N 73°58′04″W
- Website: https://www.cafeboulud.com

Café Boulud, stylized as Café Boulud at Maison BARNES, is a French restaurant located at 100 East 63rd Street on the Upper East Side in Manhattan, in New York City. It is owned by French celebrity chef and restaurateur Daniel Boulud. Boulud is New York City's longest-tenured four-star chef.

The restaurant opened in 1998 at 20 East 76th Street (between Fifth Avenue and Madison Avenue), inside the Surrey Hotel. It closed in 2021 during the COVID-19 pandemic and reopened in 2023 at 100 East 63rd Street after a renovation from Jeffrey Beers International. It is directly connected to another French restaurant, Maison Barnes, and is a collaboration with Barnes International, a luxury French real estate company. Upon reopening, Boulud brought Head Chef Romain Paumier and Pastry Chef Katalina Diaz over from his first restaurant, Daniel. It is named for a restaurant just outside Lyon, France, that was once owned by Boulud's family. In the summer, the restaurant's original location had terrace tables.

Café Boulud’s menu was inspired by Daniel Boulud’s four culinary muses: La Tradition, classic French cuisine; La Saison, seasonal delicacies; Le Potager, the vegetable garden; and Le Voyage, flavors of world cuisines.

== Reviews ==
A review in 2000 in which The New York Times gave it three stars said: "Cafe Boulud is sleek and easy, and the entire staff has been given permission to have fun. You never quite know what the menu will offer. Most days there are 30 or more dishes, and none are ordinary."

In 2013, Zagat's gave it a food rating of 27, the third-highest rating in the East 70s. One Zagat's reviewer called it: "A neighborhood bistro for billionaires."

== See also ==
- List of Michelin-starred restaurants in New York City
