= Chuck's Day Off =

Canadian television program

- Starring: Chuck Hughes
- Country of origin: Canada
- No. of episodes: 52

Production
- Running time: 30 minutes

Original release
- Network: Food Network

Chuck's Day Off is a cooking show starring restaurateur and chef Chuck Hughes. It was spun off with Chuck's Week Off in which Hughes spent his vacation in Mexico helping out people in the food industry and or trying out the different regional cuisines.
