= Donut Showdown =

American cooking competition series

- Genre: Food reality television; Cooking competition
- Presented by: Danny Boome (2013–2014); Daryn Jones (2014–2015)
- Country of origin: United States
- Original language: English
- No. of seasons: 2
- No. of episodes: 38

Production
- Executive producer: Blair Harley
- Camera setup: Multiple
- Running time: 30 minutes
- Production company: Architect Films

Original release
- Network: Cooking Channel
- Release: July 3, 2013 – January 29, 2015

Donut Showdown is an American food-based television series that aired on Cooking Channel. The show was originally hosted by Danny Boome and was later hosted by Daryn Jones. The series was produced by Architect Films.

The series pits three contestants against each other to make donuts, with the winner awarded a US$10,000 prize.

== Episodes ==
=== Season 1 (2013) ===
No. overall	No. in season	Title	Original release date	US viewers (millions)
1	1	"Good Morning"	July 3, 2013	N/A
2	2	"Camping"	July 10, 2013	N/A
3	3	"Fire & Ice"	July 17, 2013	N/A
4	4	"Land of the Rising Sun"	July 24, 2013	N/A
5	5	"Cinco de Mayo"	July 31, 2013	N/A
6	6	"Bollywood"	August 7, 2013	N/A
7	7	"Retro Diner"	August 14, 2013	N/A
8	8	"Carnival"	August 21, 2013	N/A
9	9	"High School Cafeteria"	August 28, 2013	N/A
10	10	"Pub Grub"	September 4, 2013	N/A
11	11	"Harvest"	September 11, 2013	N/A
12	12	"Love"	September 18, 2013	N/A

== Broadcast ==
The series premiered in America on The Cooking Channel on 3 July 2013.

Internationally, the series premiered in Australia on 14 August 2015 on LifeStyle Food in double episodes each week.
