= Unique Eats =

American television series

- Genre: Cooking
- Directed by: Irene Wong; Emily Benson
- Presented by: Lee Anne Wong
- Starring: Amanda Freitag
- Country of origin: United States
- Original language: English
- No. of seasons: 6
- No. of episodes: 74

Production
- Executive producer: Irene Wong
- Producer: Emily Benson
- Cinematography: Jonathan Belinski
- Editor: Tony Oswald
- Running time: 30 minutes
- Production company: iW Productions

Original release
- Network: Cooking Channel
- Release: May 31, 2010 – November 3, 2013

Related
- Unique Sweets

Unique Eats is a TV series on Cooking Channel about various restaurants across the United States and their signature dishes. The show features talking head interviews with various chefs and food critics who give their judgement about the foods. Each episode focuses on one theme, such as "comfort foods" or "desserts".

== Regular cast ==
The Unique Eats cast is made up of food industry professionals; such as chefs, restaurateurs, cookbook authors, food writers and even home cooks who all describe their favorite dishes at eating establishments featured in each episode.

- Nick Alexander - Executive Chef
- Karine Bakhoum - Restaurant Consultant
- Jamie Bissonnette - Chef
- Steve Dolinsky - Food Writer
- Anthony Hoy Fong - Chef
- Amanda Freitag - Chef
- Eddie Huang - Restaurateur/Cooking show host (Cheap Bites)
- David Joachim - Food Writer
- Candice Kumai - Chef/Food Writer
- Ian Knauer - Cookbook Author
- Mourad Lahlou - Chef/Cookbook Author
- The Lee Bros. (Matt & Ted Lee) - Food Writers
- Ed Levine - Founder, SeriousEats.com
- Debi Mazar - Actress/Cooking Show Host (Extra Virgin)
- Catherine McCord - Food Writer
- Yigit Pura - Pastry Chef
- Marcus Samuelsson - Chef/Restaurateur
- Tamara Reynolds - Food Writer
- Bradley Rubin - Restauanter
- Aarón Sanchez - Chef/Restaurateur
- Aarti Sequeira - Cooking Show Host (Aarti Party)
- Mike Thelin - Food Writer
- Lee Anne Wong - Chef/TV Personality
- Andrew Zimmern - Cooking Show Host (Bizarre Foods)

== Episode list ==
=== Season 1 (2010) ===
№	#	Title	Original airdate
1	1	"Comfort Foods"	May 31, 2010
2	2	"Meats"	May 31, 2010
3	3	"Desserts"	June 14, 2010
4	4	"Gastropubs"	June 21, 2010
5	5	"Hand-Held Eats"	July 15, 2010
6	6	"Adventure"	August 2, 2010
7	7	"Food Fantasy"	August 9, 2010
8	8	"Americana"	August 9, 2010
9	9	"Great Spaces"	August 16, 2010
10	10	"Italian"	August 23, 2010

=== Season 2 (2010-2011) ===
№	#	Title	Original airdate
11	1	"Brunch"	November 21, 2010
12	2	"Late-Night Eats"	November 28, 2010
13	3	"Cupcakes"	December 5, 2010
14	4	"Southern Favorites"	December 12, 2010
15	5	"Burgers"	December 19, 2010
16	6	"Ice Cream"	December 26, 2010
17	7	"Sandwiches"	January 23, 2011
18	8	"Chocolate"	January 30, 2011
19	9	"Street Food"	February 9, 2011
20	10	"Extreme Farm to Table"	February 27, 2011
21	11	"Cheese"	March 13, 2011
22	12	"Drinks"	March 20, 2011
23	13	"Small Plates"	March 27, 2011

=== Season 3 (2011) ===
№	#	Title	Original airdate
24	1	"Seafood"	April 3, 2011
25	2	"Asian"	April 10, 2011
26	3	"Delis"	April 17, 2011
27	4	"Pubs"	April 24, 2011
28	5	"Bistro"	April 31, 2011
29	6	"BBQ"	June 5, 2011
30	7	"Pizza"	June 12, 2011
31	8	"Chicken"	June 26, 2011
32	9	"Neighborhood Gems"	June 19, 2011
33	10	"Cheap Eats"	July 3, 2011
34	11	"Fried Food"	July 10, 2011
35	12	"Lunch Spots"	July 17, 2011
36	13	"Wine Bars"	July 31, 2011

=== Season 4 (2011-2012) ===
№	#	Title	Original airdate
37	1	"Queens"	November 27, 2011
38	2	"Between the Bun"	December 4, 2011
39	3	"Mexican"	January 1, 2012
40	4	"Bar Food"	January 8, 2012
41	5	"Eat & Sleep"	January 15, 2012
42	6	"Maine Weekend"	January 22, 2012
43	7	"Comfort Foods"	January 22, 2012
44	8	"Wine Country Weekend"	February 12, 2012
45	9	"Local Legends"	February 19, 2012
33	10	"Dirt Cheap & Delicious"	February 26, 2012
46	11	"Food By Fire"	March 4, 2012
47	12	"Portland Weekend"	March 18, 2012
48	13	"Pasta"	March 25, 2012
49	14	"Philadelphia Weekend"	April 22, 2012

=== Season 5 (2012) ===
№	#	Title	Original airdate
50	1	"Eat Your Veggies"	April 29, 2012
51	2	"Craving Comfort"	May 6, 2012
52	3	"Hot Spots"	May 27, 2012
53	4	"Nostalgis Noshes"	June 10, 2012
54	5	"Romantic Spots"	June 17, 2012
55	6	"Global"	June 24, 2012
56	7	"Mash-Ups"	July 1, 2012
57	8	"Hot & Spicy"	July 8, 2012
58	9	"Off the Grid"	July 15, 2012
59	10	"Vegas"	July 22, 2012
60	11	"Polynesian Paradise"	August 26, 2012
61	12	"Houston Weekend"	August 3, 2012
62	13	"Seafood"	September 3, 2012

=== Season 6 (2013) ===
№	#	Title	Original airdate
63	1	"Old School"	August 11, 2013
64	2	"Hotlanta"	August 18, 2013
65	3	"Swine"	August 25, 2013
66	4	"Chi-Town"	September 1, 2013
67	5	"Innovators"	September 8, 2013
68	6	"Modern Italian"	September 15, 2013
69	7	"Reinvention"	September 22, 2013
70	8	"New Asian"	September 29, 2013
71	9	"Small Bites"	October 6, 2013
72	10	"Hot Lunch Spots"	October 13, 2013
73	11	"Ethnic Eats"	October 27, 2013
74	12	"Brooklyn Rising"	November 3, 2013
