= Cooking Channel =

American pay television channel

- Country: United States
- Broadcast area: United States
- Headquarters: Knoxville, Tennessee, U.S.

Programming
- Picture format: 1080i (HDTV) (Downgraded to letterboxed 480i for SDTV feed)

Ownership
- Owner: Skydance Corporation (69%); Nexstar Media Group (31%)
- Parent: Television Food Network, G.P.
- Sister channels: see list of assets owned by Skydance Corporation

History
- Launched: August 21, 2002; 24 years ago
- Former names: Fine Living Network (2002–2010)

Links
- Website: www.cookingchanneltv.com(defunct, now redirects to www.foodnetwork.com)

Availability

Streaming media
- Service(s): DirecTV Stream, Hulu + Live TV, Philo, Sling TV

Cooking Channel is an American basic cable channel owned by and spin-off of Food Network. Both are owned by Television Food Network, G.P., a joint venture and general partnership between Skydance Corporation (69%) and Nexstar Media Group (31%). The channel airs programming related to food and cooking. Cooking Channel is available via traditional cable television as well as Discovery+ since January 2021.

As of November 2023, Cooking Channel is available to approximately 34,000,000 pay television households in the United States-down from its 2016 peak of 66,000,000 households. Along with American Heroes Channel, Destination America, Discovery Family, Discovery Life, and Science Channel, Cooking Channel is among the less prevalent networks of Warner Bros. Discovery.

In recent years, Cooking Channel has lost carriage with the growth of streaming alternatives including its parent company's HBO Max, and has generally been depreciated by Warner Bros. Discovery in current retransmission consent negotiations with cable and streaming providers.

== History ==
=== As Fine Living ===
The channel was announced by Scripps in 2001 and launched the following year as Fine Living (later Fine Living Network, FLN). The brand was positioned towards high-income viewers "who want guidance in helping spend their free time", and featured a mix of lifestyle- and leisure-themed programming dealing with topics such as travel and adventure, finance, real estate, "everyday pursuits", and technology. Scripps positioned Fine Living as a multi-platform brand, having launched a companion website, and purchasing a 49% stake in a free-circulation magazine that would be co-branded with the channel. Scripps planned to invest $100 million in original programming for Fine Living. The network was launched on August 21, 2002.

In 2007, Fine Living acquired primetime encores of the syndicated series The Martha Stewart Show. The network later added Whatever, Martha!, a series featuring her daughter Alexis Stewart and Jennifer Hutt comedically riffing over footage from Martha Stewart Living.

=== As Cooking Channel ===
In October 2009, Scripps Networks Interactive announced that Fine Living would be relaunched as Cooking Channel in 2010, after the Great Recession and a severe decline in American personal income and spending effectively stunted Fine Living Network from any further ratings or programming expansion. The network would be a spin-off of Food Network oriented towards instructional and personality-based programming, which had been largely displaced by the growth of Food Network's reality and competition programming. The network airs both new series, and archived programming from Food Network. Cooking Channel launched on May 31, 2010 (coinciding with the Memorial Day holiday), pushed ahead from a planned launch later in the year.

== Programming ==
=== Original series ===
Food Network stars Emeril Lagasse, Rachael Ray and Bobby Flay were among the first to air new programs on the channel, entitled Emeril's Fresh Food Fast, Week In a Day, and Brunch at Bobby's.

Original programming included the Mo Rocca-hosted food education program Food(ography) and the combination reality TV series and cooking show Extra Virgin, featuring slice-of-life footage of actress Debi Mazar, her Italian chef husband Gabriele Cocoros, their two children, and assorted friends and family members. The weekly series Robert Earl's Be My Guest, which premiered in September 2014, features entrepreneur and restaurateur Robert Earl as he goes behind the velvet rope to share the best-of-the-best dining secrets and destinations. During February 2015, Cooking Channel premiered Unwrapped 2.0—a revival of the original Food Network series Unwrapped. Actress Haylie Duff presented The Real Girl's Kitchen and Haylie's America on the channel.

Other original series include Dinner at Tiffani's hosted by Tiffani Thiessen, Man Fire Food hosted by Roger Mooking, Food: Fact or Fiction? hosted by Michael McKean, Tia Mowry at Home hosted by Tia Mowry, Cheap Eats hosted by Ali Khan, Carnival Eats hosted by Noah Cappe, Rev Run's Sunday Suppers hosted by Rev Run, Unique Eats, Unique Sweets, and Donut Showdown.

=== Repeats ===
Shows airing on the Cooking Channel that are first to air in the United States but have previously aired outside the country come predominantly from cooks in Canada and Great Britain, such as Food Network Canada host David Rocco, who hosts the self-titled David Rocco's Dolce Vita and Irish chef Rachel Allen with Rachel Allen: Bake!. The following Cooking Channel programs are either "first to air in the U.S." or reruns that come from the Food Network library: A Cook's Tour, Ace of Cakes, Bill's Food, Bitchin' Kitchen, Caribbean Food Made Easy, Chuck's Day Off, Chinese Food Made Easy, Cupcake Wars, Drink Up, Easy Chinese San Francisco by Ching He Huang, Everyday Exotic, Everyday Italian with Giada De Laurentiis, FoodCrafters, Food Jammers, French Food at Home, Good Eats, Indian Food Made Easy, Iron Chef (original Japanese version), Iron Chef America, MasterChef Canada, Spice Goddess, Two Fat Ladies, and Tyler's Ultimate, in addition to various past programs hosted by Julia Child and Nigella Lawson.

== International versions ==
=== As Fine Living ===
From September 3, 2004 to October 19, 2009, a Canadian version of FLN was broadcast under the name Fine Living. It was replaced by a Canadian version of DIY Network.

In Europe, FLN launched in 2010, replaced Zone Club, except Poland.

From March 26, 2014 to October 22, 2017, an Italian version of FLN was broadcast under the name Fine Living.

=== As Cooking Channel ===
A Canadian version of Cooking Channel launched on December 12, 2016, replacing W Movies. It is operated by Corus Entertainment, who also operates the Canadian version of Food Network; Scripps Networks Interactive acquired a minority stake in the channel following its launch. On January 1, 2025, Corus lost the rights to most WBD lifestyle and factual brands, causing the complete shutdown nationwide. Rogers Sports and Media took over all the rights, including Cooking Channel, moving its content to Citytv+.
