= Hobo's =

Defunct restaurant and bar in Portland, Oregon, U.S.

Hobo's Restaurant and Lounge

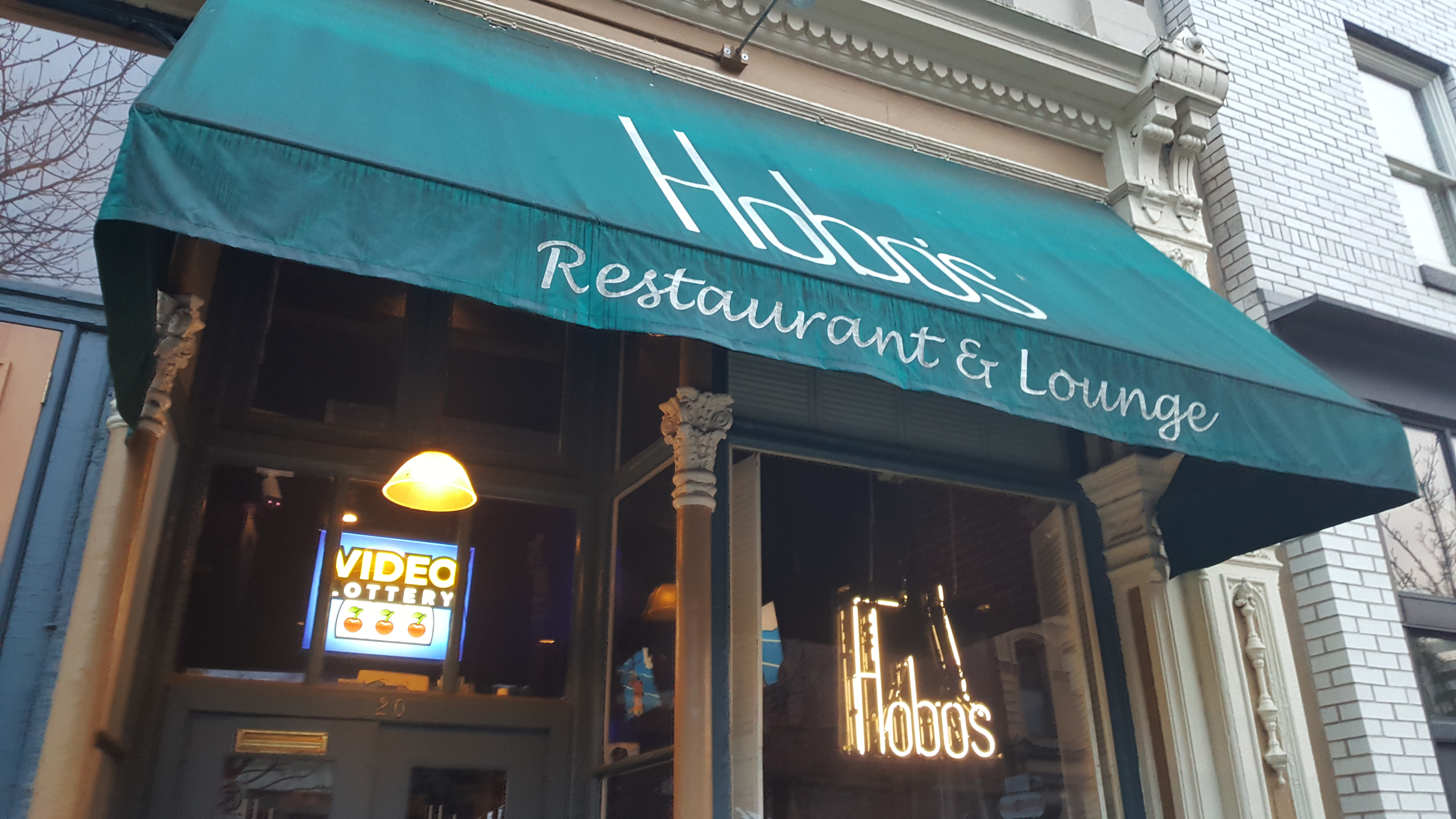
- Entrance to Hobo's, 2017
- Interactive map of Hobo's Restaurant and Lounge

Restaurant information
- Closed: 2020
- Food type: American
- Location: 120 Northwest 3rd Avenue, Portland, Multnomah, Oregon, 97209, United States
- Coordinates: 45.52420°N 122.67323°W

Hobo's Restaurant and Lounge, or simply Hobo's, was a restaurant, gay bar, and piano bar in Portland, Oregon's Old Town Chinatown, in the United States. Housed in a building with rare access to the Shanghai tunnels, the establishment served as a starting point for guided tours. The menu consisted of American cuisine including steakhouse fare. Hobo's was featured on the Food Network's Rachael Ray's Tasty Travels and the Travel Channel's Ghost Adventures, before closing during the COVID-19 pandemic.

== Description ==
Hobo's was a restaurant, gay bar, and piano bar located at 120 Northwest 3rd Avenue in downtown Portland's Old Town Chinatown. The establishment also served as a starting point for tours of the Shanghai tunnels.

In 2008, Willamette Week's Amanda Waldroupe described Hobo's as a "chi-chi, predominantly gay establishment" and wrote, "Coming here, you may run into the famous or semi-famous (City Council candidate Ed Garren was spotted), or see escaping sailors emerge from the Shanghai Tunnels—the entrance is in front of the bar—in need of a drink". In 2009, the newspaper's Ryan Fleming described Hobo's as a "relaxed and casual place to go before heading to the more hectic clubs nearby". He said the space was "primarily a restaurant" with a bar, pool, and pianists performing live, and described the clientele as "an array of Portlanders, many of them looking to get laid".

In 2002, CNN's Dmae Roberts called Hobo's an "upscale restaurant with a really full and fantastic-looking bar". Christina O'Connor of the Daily Emerald described Hobo's as a "classy and inviting" lounge with candlelit tables and rare access to the tunnels, along with neighboring Old Town Pizza. The tunnels were accessed by a trapdoor and stairs to the restaurant's basement. Lonely Planet described Hobo's as a "classy gay-centric restaurant-piano bar" and a "quiet, relaxed place ... good for a romantic dinner or drink", with live music Thursday through Sunday, starting at 7:00 pm. The restaurant, which Eater Portland's Byron Beck and Conner Reed called "spacious", had an "extensive" dinner menu, serving prime rib, crab cakes, and other steakhouse "favorites", as of 2019. Hobo's served cocktails, beer, and coffee drinks. Happy hour was available daily from 4:00-6:30 pm, as of 2009.

== History ==
Michael P. Jones, a historian, tour guide, and founder of the company Portland Underground Tours, used Hobo's as an entrance to the tunnels, as of 2002–2010. Jones also used the tunnel entrance is his capacity as founder of the Cascade Geographic Society, for which he also served as a tour guide. Hobo's staff were reportedly familiar with his work and unfazed by his presence. O'Connor wrote in 2010:

Everyone in Hobo's seems to know Jones. Servers wave as they rush back and forth taking orders and bussing tables. He grants them a nod and continues talking. Everybody who is affiliated with the area beneath Hobo's seems to know Jones, too.

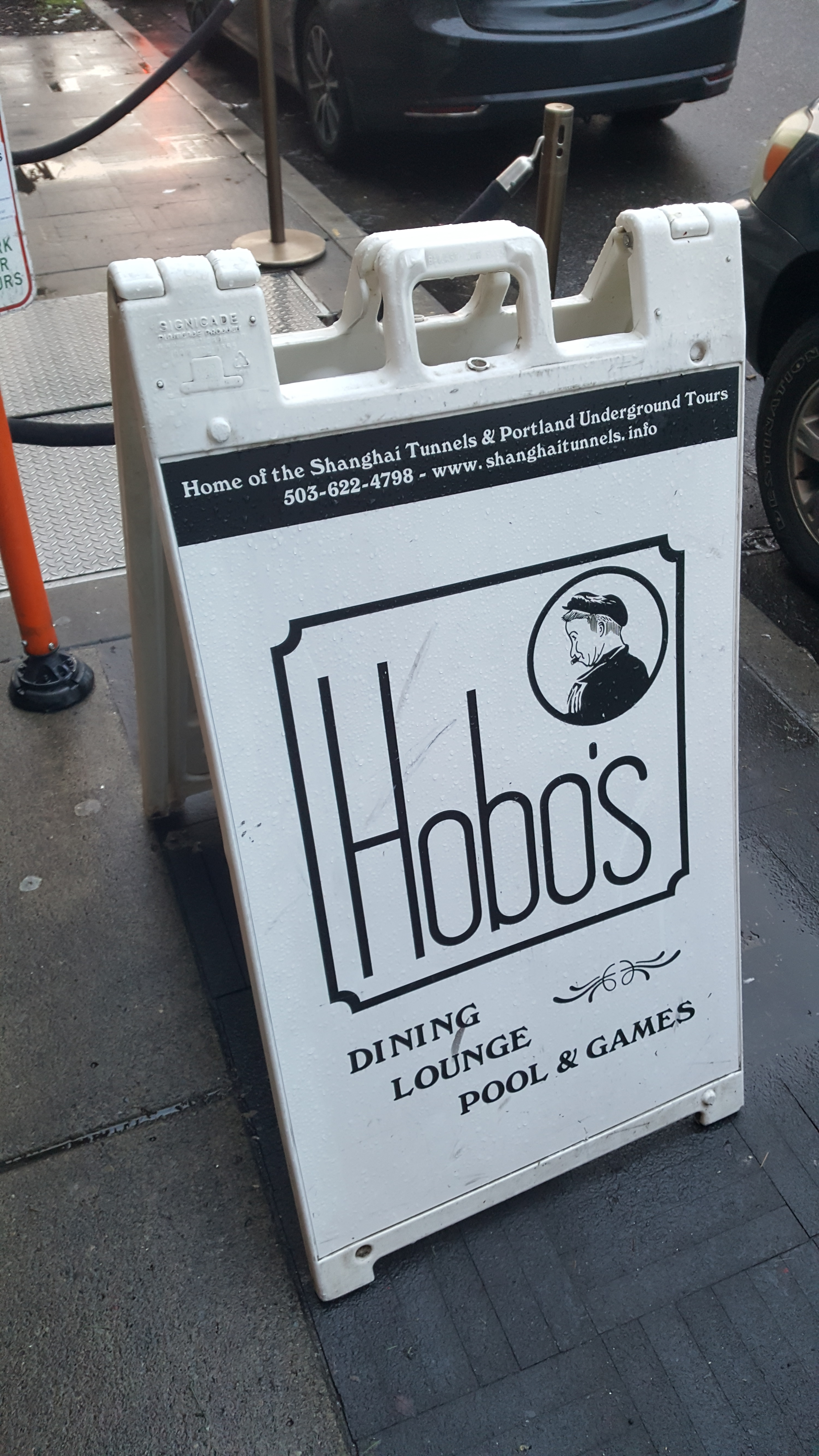
Sign for Hobo's, 2017

Rachael Ray visited the restaurant for the seventh episode of the second season of the Food Network's Rachael Ray's Tasty Travels, which focused on Portland. According to the network, in the episode she "uncovers Portland's past with a visit to Hobo's for scallops". In 2012, Hobo's was featured on the fourth episode ("Shanghai Tunnels") of the sixth season of the paranormal documentary and reality television series Ghost Adventures. During the episode, ghost hunters Zak Bagans, Aaron Goodwin, and Nick Groff "delve deep into the dingy Shanghai Tunnels to unearth the spirits that still haunt Hobo's Restaurant ... and collect some compelling visual evidence", as claimed by the Travel Channel.

Hobo's closed by October 2020 during the COVID-19 pandemic.

== Reception ==
Amanda Waldroupe of Willamette Week wrote that "especially on a warm night—the intimate lighting and laissez-faire wait staff make this a good place to chill out and enjoy good drinks". The newspaper's Ryan Flemming said the restaurant and bar serve "good" food and "stagger-inducing" drinks, respectively. In 2013, Out included Hobo's on a list of "200 of the Greatest Gay Bars in the World" and said, "Carefully exposed brick, piano leather booths and well-rounded dinner menu tell you right away Hobo's doesn't live up to its name. It's a midscale restaurant and bar that courts a more refined, casual crowd. Perfect for a casual drink." In their overview of the city's "wildest gay bars and hangouts" for Eater Portland, Beck and Reed called Hobo's "one of the best and perhaps last piano bars in town ... where it's at for those who want to kick back to a few show tunes and lounge in the luxuriousness of a true old-school gay bar" and "a must for anyone who wants see what this town looked like before Voodoo Doughnuts and Portlandia." In the guide book Moon Portland (2019), Hollyanna McCollom wrote:

Had Old Blue Eyes and the rest of the Rat Pack been gay, this is where they would have hung out. Dark and comfortable, each table feels a little bit private, and with the addition of flickering candlelight and the soft piano, it's downright romantic. The Hobo's staff is friendly and attentive, and it's an elegant choice for anyone seeking clandestine conversation over cocktails and delectable entrées.

== See also ==
- Impact of the COVID-19 pandemic on the LGBT community
- Impact of the COVID-19 pandemic on the restaurant industry in the United States
- List of Ghost Adventures episodes
- List of LGBTQ bars
- Reportedly haunted locations in Oregon
