= OTP =

OTP may refer to

== Businesses and organizations ==
- OTP Bank (originally Országos Takarék Pénztár), independent financial services providers in central and eastern Europe
- OTP Ingatlanpont, Hungarian real estate brokerage firm
- Office of Technology Policy, U.S. government office
- Office of Telecommunications Policy, U.S. government office 1970–1978
- Office of Transport and Traffic Policy and Planning, department of the Thai Government
- Old Town Pizza, pizzeria in Portland, Oregon, U.S.

== Technology ==
- One-time pad, in cryptography
- One-time password or one-time PIN, a password or PIN that is valid for only one login session or transaction
- One-time programmable memory, a type of programmable read-only memory (ROM) in electronics
- Open Telecom Platform, a collection of middleware, libraries, and tools written in Erlang programming language
- Opposite Track Path, in optical technology such as DVD or Blu-ray
- Over-temperature protection, a feature of modern computer power supply units

== Transportation ==
- Henri Coandă International Airport (IATA: OTP), in Bucharest, Romania
- Outram Park MRT station (MRT station abbreviation: OTP), in Singapore
- On-time performance, the level of success of the service (such as a bus or train) remaining on the published schedule

== Other uses ==
- Oulun Työväen Palloilijat, a Finnish football and bandy club
- "One true pairing", a term used in media fandom
- "Outside the perimeter", used by residents of Atlanta to refer to suburban areas outside Interstate 285
- Opioid Treatment Program, a legal designation for methadone clinics in the United States.
- Office of the President (disambiguation)
