= Blagen Block =

Building in Portland, Oregon, U.S.

- U.S. Historic district – Contributing property
- Portland Historic Landmark
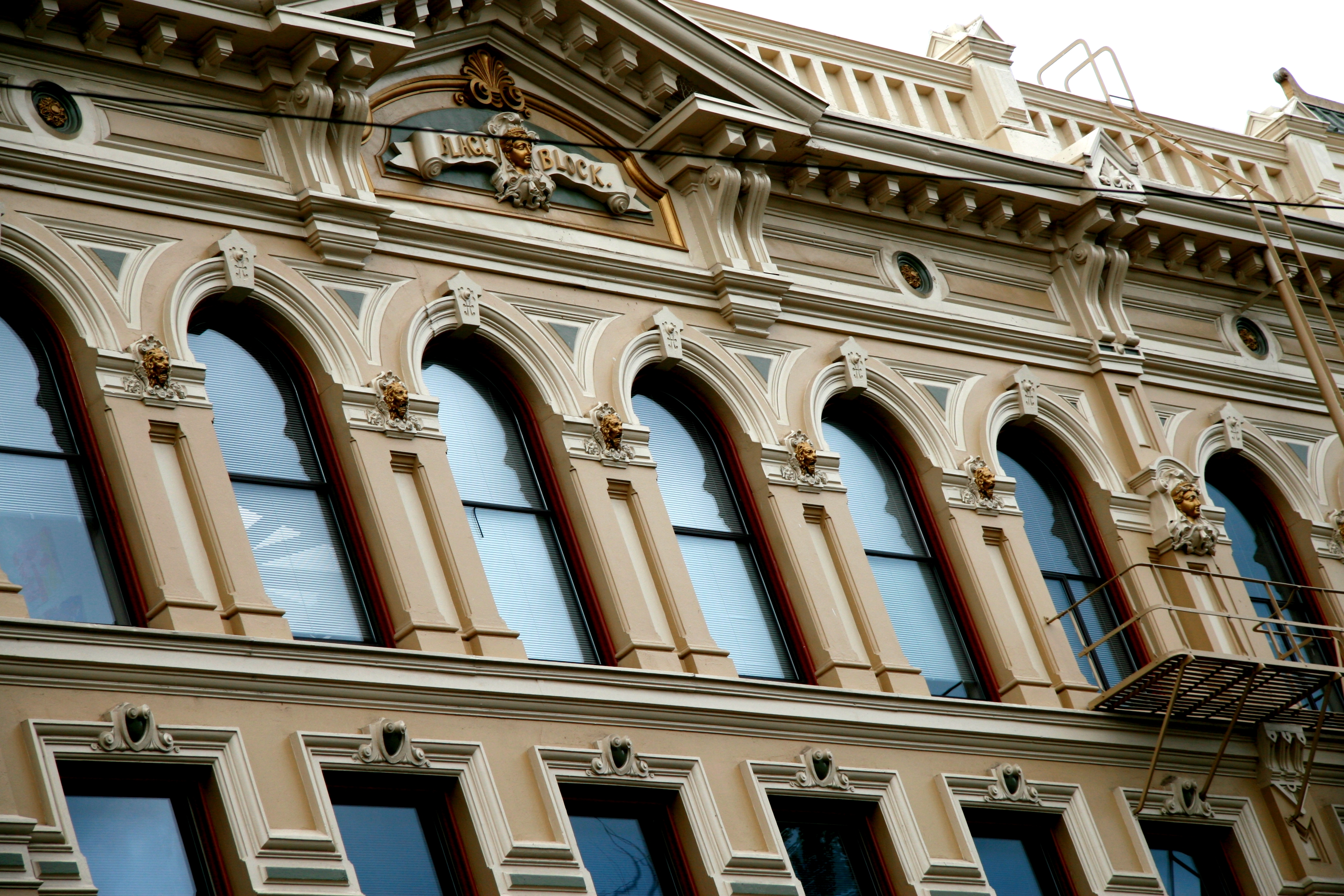
- The building's exterior, 2007

- Location within Portland, Oregon
- Location: 30–34 NW First Avenue; Portland, Oregon
- Coordinates: 45°31′25.2″N 122°40′15.8″W
- Built: 1888
- Architect: Warren H. Williams
- Architectural style: originally Italianate
- Part of: Portland Skidmore/Old Town Historic District (ID75001597)
- Designated CP: December 5, 1975

The Blagen Block is an historic building in Portland, Oregon's Old Town Chinatown neighborhood, in the United States. The four-story building was designed by Warren H. Williams and completed in 1888. In 1970, the city's Historic Landmarks Commission designated the Blagen Block as a Portland Historic Landmark. In 1975, it was listed as a primary landmark in the National Register of Historic Places (NRHP) nomination of the Portland Skidmore/Old Town Historic District, the building's designation subsequently translated to "contributing property" under post-1970s NRHP terminology. Since 2014, Airbnb has had offices in the building, opening its office in December of that year.
