= Merchant Hotel (Portland, Oregon) =

Hotel in Portland, Oregon

- Merchants Hotel
- U.S. Historic district – Contributing property
- Portland Historic Landmark
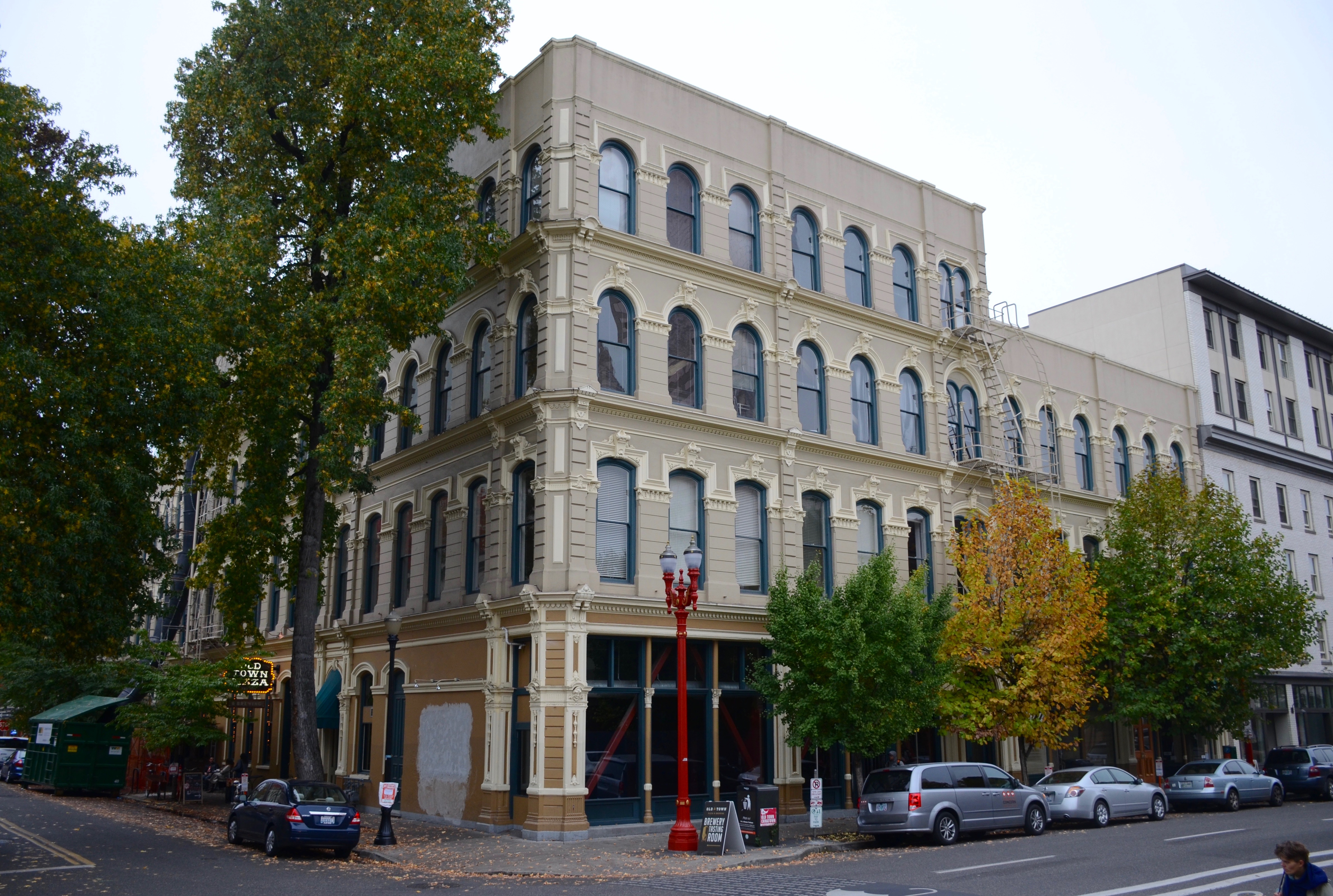
- Viewed from the northwest in 2016

- Location within Portland, Oregon
- Location: 121 NW Second Avenue, Portland, Oregon
- Coordinates: 45°31′27.4″N 122°40′21.7″W
- Built: 1880–1884
- Architect: Warren Heywood Williams
- Architectural style: Italianate
- Part of: Portland Skidmore/Old Town Historic District (ID75001597)
- Designated CP: December 6, 1975

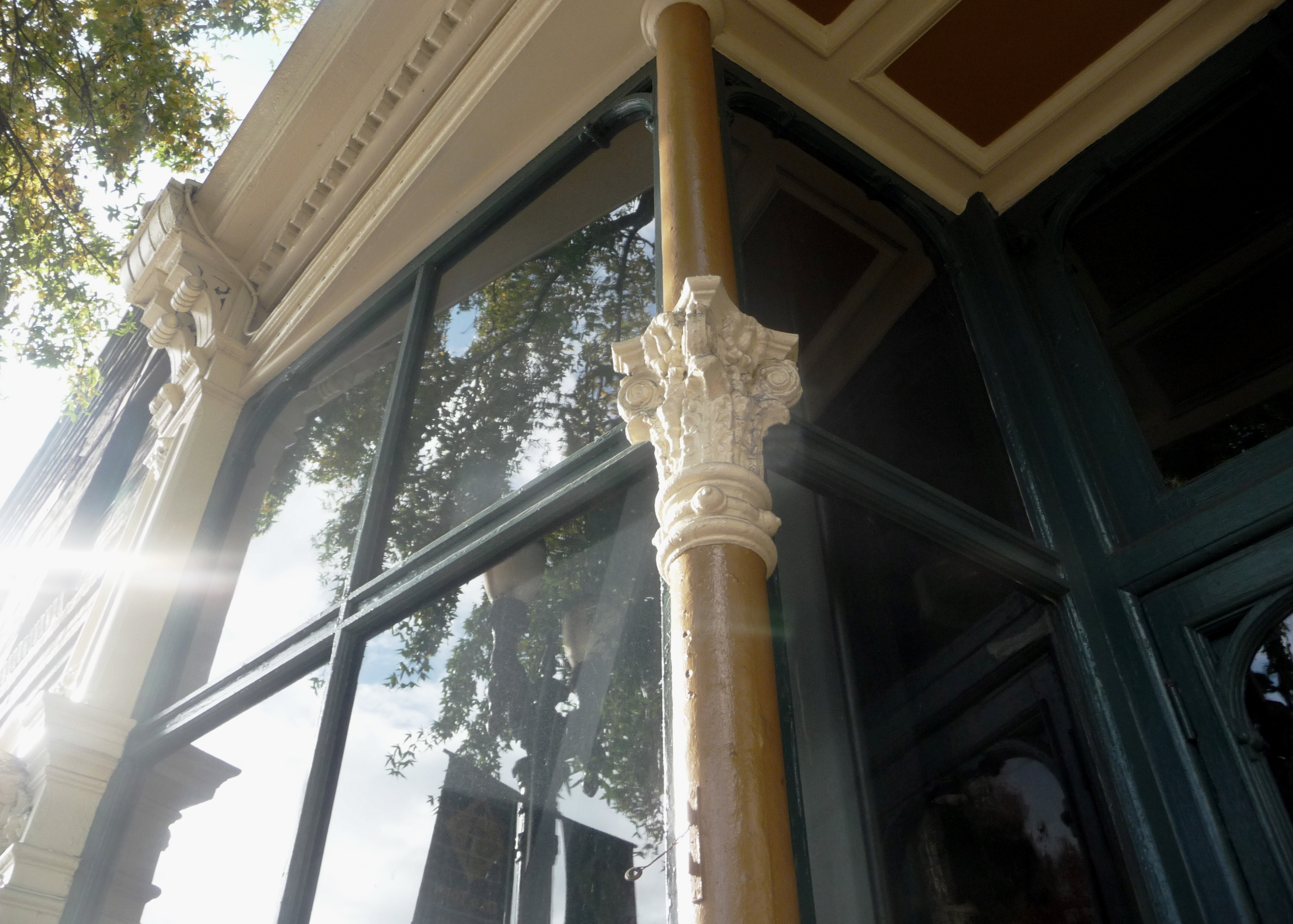
Detail of the building's exterior, 2010

The Merchant Hotel, also known as the Merchants' Hotel, is a historic former hotel building in Portland, Oregon, United States. It is located at 121 N.W. Second Avenue in Old Town Chinatown. It is a contributing property in the Portland Skidmore/Old Town Historic District, which was listed on the U.S. National Register of Historic Places in 1975 and designated a National Historic Landmark District in 1977. It is one of the few remaining examples of Victorian Italianate, cast iron architecture on the West Coast. It occupies half of a city block, specifically along the south side of N.W. Davis Street from Second to Third Avenues.

== History ==
Brothers Louis, Adolph, and Theodore Nicolai were original owners of the hotel. It took four years to build, and the Second Avenue section was completed in 1880. The Third Avenue section opened in 1884. A luxury hotel, it boasted one of the first hydraulic elevators in the city and by 1889 had grown to take up half of the city block. The hotel was purchased by musician Eugene Stebinger in the 1890s.

In addition to its use as a hotel, the building "has also housed a bar, brothel, billiards hall, and most notoriously, a cracker factory", wrote author Bart King in 2007.

=== 1960s to present ===
The last use of any part of the building as a hotel ended in mid-1967. In late 1967 or early 1968, Skidmore Development Company purchased the building along with two adjacent buildings. Ground-floor space along the N.W. Third Avenue side was being used by a grocery store and an appliance store at that time. A renovation and restoration was carried out in 1968–1969. In December 1968, a furniture store became the first post-remodel tenant, occupying one-quarter of the ground-floor space. The upper floors were remodeled as office space. In 1971, the building was repainted in bright green with white trim. The renovation was deemed a success, and the shops were described in 1972 as "thriving". In a 1979 article, The Oregonian wrote that the "former Merchants Hotel in Old Town went from virtually abandoned building to cornerstone of Old Town business district, thanks to vision of Bill [Naito] and Sam Naito," of Skidmore Development Company.

The building received a $2 million seismic upgrade in 2004. Among the current tenants are Old Town Pizza and the Oregon Nikkei Legacy Center, which includes the Japanese American History Museum. The Faux Museum is in the corner storefront at N.W. Second and Davis.
