= $40 a Day =

- Title card from 2002 to 2003
- Genre: Travel, food
- Created by: Rachael Ray
- Starring: Rachael Ray
- Theme music composer: Jonathan Merrill; Killer Tracks
- Opening theme: "Money Money Money"
- Country of origin: United States
- No. of seasons: 4
- No. of episodes: 77

Production
- Executive producers: Allison Page; Tara Sandler; Jennifer Davidson; Scott Templeton
- Running time: 30 minutes
- Production company: Pie Town Productions

Original release
- Network: Food Network
- Release: April 1, 2002 – December 2, 2005

$40 a Day was a Food Network show hosted by Rachael Ray. In each episode, Ray takes a one-day trip to an American, Canadian, or European city with only $40 US, to spend on food. While touring the city, she finds restaurants to go to (often based on local recommendations), and usually manages to fit three meals and some sort of snack or after-dinner drink into her small budget.

The show premiered on April 1, 2002, five months after the debut of 30 Minute Meals, making it her second show on the Food Network. Some clips are sometimes used in Ray's later series, Rachael Ray's Tasty Travels. Another Food Network series, Giada's Weekend Getaways starring Giada De Laurentiis, is similar in format, as noted by Anthony Bourdain. In 2010, The Travel Channel began airing reruns of the show. As of 2013, the show is no longer in reruns on the Travel Channel.

== Details ==
According to Ray, visiting a fast food restaurant, particularly those of national chains, is considered cheating (she says so explicitly in the Orlando episode). On occasion, smaller sit-down restaurant chains (such as Bahama Breeze in the Las Vegas episode, or Bongos in the South Beach episode) are visited. Generally, non-food items and non-food-related activities are not included in her budget.

Ray always offers tips on what to see in the various cities, as well as hints on how to save money and find bargains while traveling. She also emphasizes researching whatever city she plans to visit through the Internet and asking the local citizens for their recommendations.

Initially, Ray only used item prices against her $40 limit. She started including applicable taxes and tips during the first season. On occasion, she does go over budget; however, during her trips to Philadelphia and Arizona, she did so on purpose. Her cheapest day was in Vancouver, British Columbia, in 2003, when she spent just under US$25 including taxes and tips (at the time, less than $40 Canadian, although she budgeted for US$40). On occasions, she has had to get creative to stay on-budget; for example, she accidentally blew half her budget on her second meal in her first Miami episode.

The pilot, shot in Los Angeles, had a 12-hour limit, but subsequent episodes raised it to 24 hours. Usually episodes begin in the morning with breakfast, occasionally brunch. Episodes almost always feature four paid meals, but on at least one occasion, in the Research Triangle (Raleigh-Durham-Chapel Hill, NC), she did five meals. Also on rare occasion, only three meals are paid, and a fourth ends up being free. On only one occasion, in Antigua, she partook of a hotel's free Continental breakfast, but she still did four paid meals in that episode.

On her first visit to Las Vegas during the first season, Ray began with dinner and stayed overnight, ending with breakfast.

She did several episodes in Europe when the euro was still valued less than the U.S. dollar. She has not visited Europe since the U.S. dollar has fallen under the euro in value. She has also visited several island locales, including Bermuda and Antigua, both of which generally accept the U.S. dollar.

Ray has occasionally drawn controversy when some meals end up calculating with less-than-traditional tips.

== Episodes ==
=== Season 1 (2002–03) ===
No. overall	No. in season	Title	Directed by	Written by	Original release date	Prod. code
1	1	"Los Angeles"	Tara Sandler	Peter Field and Rachael Ray	April 1, 2002	AD1A01
2	2	"Napa"	Wade Sheeler	Peter Field and Rachael Ray	April 24, 2002	AD1A03
3	3	"Florida Keys"	Wade Sheeler and Courtney MacGregor	Peter Field and Rachael Ray	May 1, 2002	AD1A06
4	4	"Vancouver"	Wade Sheeler and Courtney MacGregor	Peter Field and Rachael Ray	May 15, 2002	AD1A08
5	5	"San Francisco"	Wade Sheeler	Peter Field and Rachael Ray	May 22, 2002	AD1A02
6	6	"Orlando"	Wade Sheeler	Peter Field and Rachael Ray	May 29, 2002	AD1A05
7	7	"Seattle"	Wade Sheeler	Peter Field and Rachael Ray	June 5, 2002	AD1A09
8	8	"Miami"	Wade Sheeler	Peter Field and Rachael Ray	June 12, 2002	AD1A07
9	9	"Monterey"	Wade Sheeler	Peter Field and Rachael Ray	June 19, 2002	AD1A04
10	10	"Portland"	Wade Sheeler	Peter Field and Rachael Ray	June 26, 2002	AD1A10
11	11	"San Diego"	Wade Sheeler	Peter Field and Rachael Ray	July 10, 2002	AD1A12
12	12	"Las Vegas"	Wade Sheeler	Peter Field and Rachael Ray	July 17, 2002	AD1A11
13	13	"Santa Barbara"	Wade Sheeler	Peter Field and Rachael Ray	July 28, 2002	AD1A13
14	14	"Rome"	Wade Sheeler	Peter Field and Rachael Ray	August 14, 2002	AD1A17
15	15	"Paris"	Wade Sheeler	Peter Field and Rachael Ray	October 2, 2002	AD1A14
16	16	"Amsterdam"	Wade Sheeler	Peter Field and Rachael Ray	October 9, 2002	AD1A16
17	17	"Cooperstown"	Wade Sheeler	Peter Field and Rachael Ray	October 16, 2002	AD1A26
18	18	"Florence"	Wade Sheeler	Peter Field and Rachael Ray	October 23, 2002	AD1A19
19	19	"Charleston"	Lesley Mayer	Peter Field and Rachael Ray	October 28, 2002	AD1A21
20	20	"Tuscany"	Wade Sheeler	Peter Field and Rachael Ray	November 6, 2002	AD1A18
21	21	"Savannah"	Lesley Mayer	Peter Field and Rachael Ray	November 28, 2002	AD1A20
22	22	"Atlanta"	Wade Sheeler	Peter Field and Rachael Ray	December 4, 2002	AD1A22
23	23	"New York City"	Wade Sheeler	Peter Field and Rachael Ray	January 8, 2003	AD1A25
24	24	"Philadelphia"	Wade Sheeler	Peter Field and Rachael Ray	January 15, 2003	AD1A24
25	25	"Washington, D.C."	Wade Sheeler	Peter Field and Rachael Ray	January 29, 2003	AD1A23
26	26	"Brussels"	Wade Sheeler	Peter Field and Rachael Ray	February 12, 2003	AD1A15

=== Season 2 (2003–04) ===
No. overall	No. in season	Title	Directed by	Written by	Original release date	Prod. code
27	1	"Dallas"	Wade Sheeler	Peter Field and Rachael Ray	March 7, 2003	AD1B07
28	2	"Vermont"	Wade Sheeler	Peter Field and Rachael Ray	April 23, 2003	AD1B01
29	3	"Oahu"	Wade Sheeler	Peter Field and Rachael Ray	April 30, 2003	AD1B04
30	4	"Cape Cod"	Wade Sheeler	Peter Field and Rachael Ray	May 14, 2003	AD1B02
31	5	"Hawaii"	Wade Sheeler	Peter Field and Rachael Ray	May 21, 2003	AD1B05
32	6	"Boston"	Wade Sheeler	Peter Field and Rachael Ray	May 28, 2003	AD1B03
33	7	"Corpus Christi"	Wade Sheeler	Peter Field and Rachael Ray	June 4, 2003	AD1B09
34	8	"Memphis"	Wade Sheeler	Peter Field and Rachael Ray	June 11, 2003	AD1B10
35	9	"Maui"	Wade Sheeler	Peter Field and Rachael Ray	June 18, 2003	AD1B06
36	10	"Austin"	Wade Sheeler	Peter Field and Rachael Ray	June 25, 2003	AD1B08
37	11	"New Orleans"	Wade Sheeler	Peter Field and Rachael Ray	July 2, 2003	AD1B11
38	12	"Nashville"	Wade Sheeler	Peter Field and Rachael Ray	July 9, 2003	AD1B12
39	13	"Laguna Beach"	Wade Sheeler	Peter Field and Rachael Ray	July 23, 2003	AD1B13
40	14	"Sedona"	Wade Sheeler	Peter Field and Rachael Ray	September 3, 2003	AD1B15
41	15	"Palm Springs"	Wade Sheeler	Peter Field and Rachael Ray	September 10, 2003	AD1B14
42	16	"Milwaukee"	Wade Sheeler	Peter Field and Rachael Ray	September 17, 2003	AD1B17
43	17	"Tucson"	Wade Sheeler	Peter Field and Rachael Ray	September 24, 2003	AD1B16
44	18	"Chicago"	Wade Sheeler	Peter Field and Rachael Ray	October 8, 2003	AD1B18
45	19	"Montreal"	Wade Sheeler	Peter Field and Rachael Ray	December 10, 2003	AD1B24
46	20	"Denver"	Wade Sheeler	Peter Field and Rachael Ray	January 7, 2004	AD1B21
47	21	"Aspen"	Wade Sheeler	Peter Field and Rachael Ray	January 21, 2004	AD1B22
48	22	"Portland"	Wade Sheeler	Peter Field and Rachael Ray	February 25, 2004	AD1B23
49	23	"Santa Fe"	Wade Sheeler	Peter Field and Rachael Ray	March 10, 2004	AD1B20
50	24	"Adirondacks"	Wade Sheeler	Peter Field and Rachael Ray	April 2, 2004	AD1B25
51	25	"Cleveland"	Wade Sheeler	Peter Field and Rachael Ray	April 9, 2004	AD1B19
52	26	"Saratoga"	Wade Sheeler	Peter Field and Rachael Ray	April 16, 2004	AD1B26

=== Season 3 (2004–05) ===
No. overall	No. in season	Title	Directed by	Written by	Original release date	Prod. code
53	1	"Park City"	Wade Sheeler	Peter Field and Rachael Ray	August 20, 2004	AD1C02
54	2	"Grand Canyon"	Don Colliver	Peter Field and Rachael Ray	August 27, 2004	AD1C04
55	3	"Durham"	Don Colliver	Peter Field and Rachael Ray	August 29, 2004	AD1C08
56	4	"Las Vegas"	Don Colliver	Peter Field and Rachael Ray	September 10, 2004	AD1C05
57	5	"Bermuda"	Don Colliver	Peter Field and Rachael Ray	September 24, 2004	AD1C06
58	6	"Sun Valley"	Wade Sheeler and Don Colliver	Peter Field and Rachael Ray	October 15, 2004	AD1C01
59	7	"Chattanooga"	Wade Sheeler and Don Colliver	Peter Field and Rachael Ray	October 29, 2004	AD1C10
60	8	"Hilton Head"	Don Colliver	Peter Field and Rachael Ray	November 12, 2004	AD1C07
61	9	"Asheville"	Don Colliver	Peter Field and Rachael Ray	November 19, 2004	AD1C09
62	10	"Telluride"	Don Colliver	Peter Field and Rachael Ray	November 26, 2004	AD1C03
63	11	"Newport"	Don Colliver	Peter Field and Rachael Ray	December 17, 2004	AD1C12
64	12	"Martha's Vineyard"	Wade Sheeler and Don Colliver	Peter Field and Rachael Ray	January 7, 2005	AD1C13
65	13	"The Hamptons"	Don Colliver	Peter Field and Rachael Ray	April 22, 2005	AD1C11

=== Season 4 (2005–06) ===
No. overall	No. in season	Title	Directed by	Written by	Original release date	Prod. code
66	1	"Mystic"	Don Colliver	Peter Field and Rachael Ray	January 21, 2005	AD1D02
67	2	"Nantucket"	Don Colliver	Peter Field and Rachael Ray	February 4, 2005	AD1D01
68	3	"Salem"	Don Colliver	Peter Field and Rachael Ray	February 18, 2005	AD1D03
69	4	"Jackson Hole"	Wade Sheeler and Don Colliver	Peter Field and Rachael Ray	April 12, 2005	AD1D06
70	5	"Mount Rushmore"	Wade Sheeler and Don Colliver	Peter Field and Rachael Ray	April 19, 2005	AD1D07
71	6	"Ashland"	Wade Sheeler and Don Colliver	Peter Field and Rachael Ray	May 3, 2005	AD1D05
72	7	"Coos Bay"	Wade Sheeler and Don Colliver	Peter Field and Rachael Ray	May 13, 2005	AD1D04
73	8	"South Beach"	Don Colliver	Peter Field and Rachael Ray	June 10, 2005	AD1D09
74	9	"Ft. Lauderdale"	Don Colliver	Peter Field and Rachael Ray	July 8, 2005	AD1D10
75	10	"San Juan"	Don Colliver	Peter Field and Rachael Ray	July 22, 2005	AD1D11
76	11	"Antigua"	Don Colliver	Peter Field and Rachael Ray	August 12, 2005	AD1D12
77	12	"New York City"	Don Colliver	Peter Field and Rachael Ray	December 2, 2005	AD1D08
