= Lake Isle Press =

American publishing house

Lake Isle Press, an independent publishing house that was founded in New York City in 1990, is the founding publisher of Rachael Ray's "30-Minute Meals" franchise. The company later broadened its scope to other culinary themes, including gluten-free cooking and baking, solo cooking, and healthy microwave meals. Eventually, Lake Isle Press came to specialize in cookbooks rooted in ethnic cuisines that were then unfamiliar to most home cooks, including Latin American, African, African-American, Indian, and Middle Eastern. The company takes its name from the W.B. Yeats poem "The Lake Isle of Innisfree."

== Early history ==
Lake Isle was founded in 1990. Its first titles were "Contemporary One-Dish Meals" by Mara Reid Rogers and "Low Fat Living for Real People" by Linda Levy and Francine Grabowski; both titles are now out of print.

Among the highlights of Lake Isle Press's first decade was the publication of the paperback edition of James Beard Foundation Award winning cookbook author Jim Fobel's book "Jim Fobel's Old-Fashioned Baking Book."

== The Rachael Ray revolution ==
Toward the end of its first decade, Lake Isle Press Publisher Hiroko Kiiffner received a call from an unknown recipe developer from upstate New York with a request to publish her new cookbook. Though Kiiffner was skeptical, she agreed to a meeting, and was immediately taken with the young author's energy and philosophy of cooking. Lake Isle Press published "Rachael Ray's 30-Minute Meals" in 1998 and an enduring cooking franchise was born. Lake Isle Press published thirteen books with Rachael Ray, including the popular "Rachael Ray's Classic 30-Minute Meals."

== The next stage ==
As Ray moved onto Food Network fame and signed a deal with Clarkson Potter, an imprint of Penguin Random House, Lake Isle Press retained control of the 30-Minute Meals titles published by Lake Isle Press, and turned its focus to exploring culinary niches, such as salads and gluten-free recipes, and ethnic cuisines with authentic recipes from chefs and culinary authorities including:

- Pierre Thiam, a Senegalese chef based in America, is a pioneer of African cuisine and founder of Yolélé, the purpose-driven natural food company that is centered on fonio, an ancient African supergrain. Pierre is executive chef and co-founder of Teranga in New York City and also the executive chef of the award-winning restaurant Nok by Alara in Lagos, Nigeria and the Signature Chef of the five-star Pullman Hotel in Dakar, Senegal. His Lake Isle Press titles include "Yolélé: Recipes from the Heart of Senegal"; "Senegal: Modern Senegalese Recipes from the Source to the Bowl," written with Jennifer Sit; and "The Fonio Cookbook: An Ancient Grain Rediscovered." "Yolélé" won the 2009 Gourmand World Cookbook Awards Special Jury Award and was a finalist for the 2009 IACP Cookbook Award Julia Child First Book Award "Senegal" was a nominee for a 2016 James Beard Foundation Award. Pierre was inducted into the James Beard Foundation's Cookbook Hall of Fame in June 2024.
- Vikas Khanna is executive chef of New York City's acclaimed restaurant, Bungalow, and founding chef of the Michelin-starred Junoon. Since 2011, he has a judge on MasterChef India. His two titles with Lake Isle Press are "Flavors First: An Indian Chef's Culinary Journey," winner of a 2012 Benjamin Franklin Award, and Return to the Rivers: Recipes and Memories of the Himalayan Valleys," nominated for a 2014 James Beard Foundation Book Award.
- Jose Garces is an American chef and restaurant owner who won the second season of The Next Iron Chef. He was named 2009: Best Chef Mid-Atlantic, James Beard Foundation. Jose's titles with Lake Isle Press are "Latin Evolution" and "The Latin Road Home."

Lake Isle Press was acquired by Globe Pequot in January 2026. Bob Marsh, president of Globe Pequot, said in a statement that Lake Isle’s cookbooks were complementary to the existing food and cooking lists at Lyons Press and Globe Pequot.

== Awards ==
- 2009 Gourmand World Cookbook Awards Special Jury Award: "Yolélé, Recipes from the Heart of Senegal"
- 2009 IACP Julia Child First Book Award: "Yolélé, Recipes from the Heart of Senegal"
- Finalist, 2008 Benjamin Franklin Award: "Raising the Salad Bar"
- Finalist, 2010 Benjamin Franklin Award: "Easy Gluten-Free Baking"
- Winner, 2012 Benjamin Franklin Award: Flavors First: An Indian Chef's Culinary Journey"
- Silver Winner, 2014 Benjamin Franklin Award: Power Hungry: The Ultimate Energy Bar Cookbook"
- Nominee, 2014 James Beard Foundation Award: "Return to the Rivers: Recipes and Memories of the Himalayan Valleys"
- Nominee, 2016 James Beard Foundation Award: "Senegal: Modern Senegalese Recipes from the Source to the Bowl"

== Lake Isle Press publishing history ==
Lake Isle Press Titles
Title	Author	Publication Date	ISBN	
Contemporary One Dish Meals	Mara Reid Rogers	1/1/90	9780962740306	Out of print
Tray Gourmet	Larry Berger and Lynn Harris	5/17/95	9780962740329	Out of print
Instant Ethnic Cook	Mara Reid Rogers	5/17/95	9780962740343	Out of print
Low-Fat Living for Real People	Linda Levy and Francine Grabowski, M.S., R.D.	12/29/97	9780962740350	Out of print
Jim Fobel's Old-Fashioned Baking Book	Jim Fobel	4/2/96	9780962740367	
Glorious Liqueurs	Mary Aurea Morris	10/1/96	9780962740374	
Fresh Eggs	George Moran	10/7/97	9780962740381	
Serves One	Toni Lydecker	4/27/98	9781891105012	
30-Minute Meals	Rachael Ray	7/20/99	9781891105036	
Comfort Foods: Rachael Ray's top 30 30-Minute Meals	Rachael Ray	11/7/00	9781891105050	
Veggie Meals: Rachael Ray's 30-Minute Meals	Rachael Ray	5/15/01	9781891105067	
The Best Diet on Earth	Linda Levy and Francine Grabowski, M.S., R.D. CDE	4/14/03	9781891105081	
Rachael Ray 30-Minute Meals 2	Rachael Ray	5/22/03	9781891105104	
Rachael Ray 30-Minute Meals Get Togethers	Rachael Ray	10/3/03	9781891105111	
Cooking Rocks: Rachael Ray 30-Minute Meals for Kids	Rachael Ray	9/20/04	9781891105159	
At Hanka's Table	Hanka Sawka	9/20/04	9781891105098	
Rachael Ray: Best Eats in Town on $40 A Day	Rachael Ray	10/12/04	781891105173	
Kid Food: Rachael Ray Top 30 30-Minute Meals	Rachael Ray	9/21/05	9781891105227	
Guy Food: Rachael Ray Top 30 30-Minute Meals	Rachael Ray	9/21/05	9781891105210	
Small World of Antique Doll's Houses	Flora Gill Jacobs	12/13/05	9781891105074	
Boy Eats World!	David Lawrence	4/26/06	9781891105256	
Rachael Ray's Open House Cookbook	Rachael Ray	9/5/06	9781891105319	
Classic 30-Minute Meals: The All-Occasion Cookbook	Rachael Ray	9/26/06	9781891105302	
In Nirmala's Kitchen	Nirmala Narine	10/4/06	9781891105265	
The Cook-Zen Cookbook: Microwave Cooking the Japanese Way — Simple, Healthy, and Delicious	Machiko Chiba	5/30/07	9781891105340	
Raising the Salad Bar	Catherine Walthers	6/05/07	9781891105333	
Latin Evolution	Jose Garces	8/4/08	9781891105371	
The New African-American Kitchen	Angela Shelf Medearis	8/21/08	9781891105395	
Yolele: Recipes from the Heart of Senegal	Pierre Thiam	8/25/08	9781891105388	
Easy Gluten-Free Baking	Elizabeth Barbone	3/16/09	9781891105418	
Ten Ingredients for a Joyous Life and Peaceful Home	Angela Shelf Medearis	5/16/09	9781891105401	Out of print
Seafood Alla Siciliana	Toni Lydecker	9/16/09	9781891105425	
The Cook-Zen Way To Eat: Microwaving Healthy and Delicious Meals in Minutes	Machiko Chiba	8/16/10	9781891105449	
Soups + Sides	Catherine Walthers	9/16/10	9781891105456	
Kitchen Diva Cooks	Angela Shelf Medearis	12/16/10	9781891105463	Out of Print
Flavors First: An Indian Chef's Culinary Journey	Vikas Khanna	7/16/11	9781891105470	
Piatto Unico: When One Course Makes a Real Italian Meal	Toni Lydecker	10/16/11	9781891105487	
Party Like a Culinista	Jill Donenfeld and Joseth Gordon	10/16/11	9781891105500	
How to Cook Gluten-Free	Elizabeth Barbone	3/16/12	9781891105517	
The Latin Road Home	Jose Garces	10/8/11	9781891105494	
Power Hungry: The Ultimate Energy Bar Cookbook	Camilla V. Saulsbury	9/10/13	9781891105548	
Return to the Rivers	Vikas Khanna with Andrew Blackmore-Dobbyn	12/7/13	9781891105531	
Senegal: Modern Senegalese Recipes from the Source to the Bowl	Pierre Thiam and Jennifer Sit	9/15/15	9781891105555	
The Chickpea Flour Cookbook	Camilla V. Saulsbury	10/7/15	781891105562	
World's Easist Paleo Baking	Elizabeth Barbone	1/7/16	9781891105579	
The Cook-Zen Wagashi Cookbook	Machiko Chiba	1/7/18	9781891105623	
The Bread & Salt Between Us: Recipes & Stories From a Syrian Refugee's Kitchen	Mayada Anjari with Jennifer Sit	9/7/18	9781891105630	
The Fonio Cookbook: An Ancient Grain Rediscovered	Pierre Thiam	11/11/19	9781891105692	
