= 45th parallel =

45th parallel may refer to:

- 45th parallel north, a circle of latitude in the Northern Hemisphere
- 45th parallel south, a circle of latitude in the Southern Hemisphere
- 45th Parallel (organization), a nonprofit organization and chamber music ensemble based in Portland, Oregon
- The 45th Parallel, newspaper of Taft High School (Lincoln City, Oregon)
