= Grand Stable and Carriage Building =

Historic building in Portland, Oregon, U.S.

- Grand Stable Building and Adjacent Commercial Building
- U.S. National Register of Historic Places
- Portland Historic Landmark
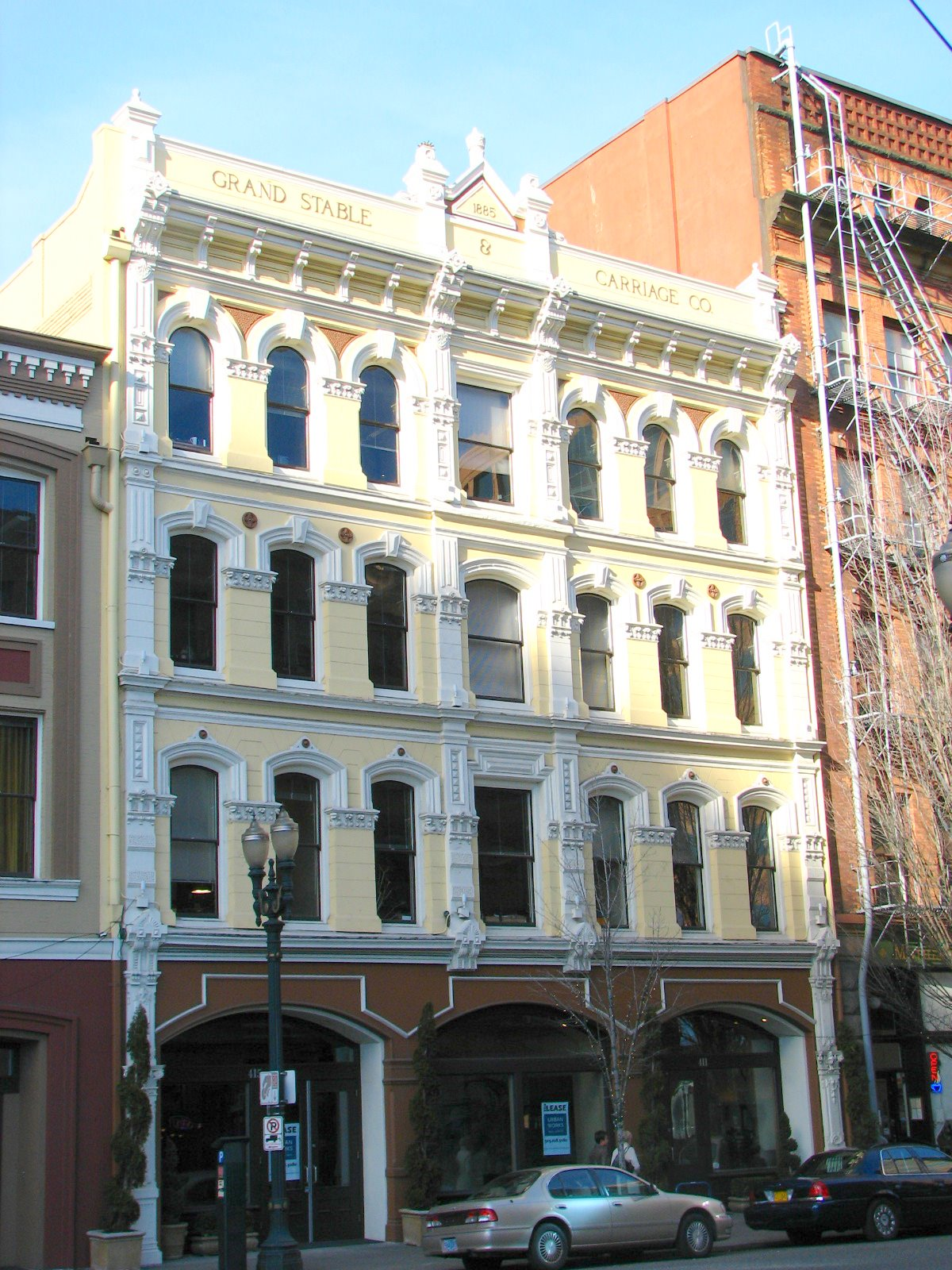
- The Grand Stable Building

- Location within Portland, Oregon Location within Oregon Location within the United States
- Location: 415–421 SW 2nd Avenue; Portland, Oregon
- Coordinates: 45°31′11″N 122°40′26″W
- Area: less than one acre
- Built: 1887
- Architect: Warren Heywood Williams
- Architectural style: Italianate Cast Iron - Commercial
- MPS: Downtown Portland, Oregon MPS
- NRHP reference No.: 82001512
- Added to NRHP: October 7, 1982

The Grand Stable and Carriage Building is a building in downtown Portland, Oregon, United States that was listed on the National Register of Historic Places on October 7, 1982. The building was built by Oregon business pioneer Simeon Gannett Reed in 1887. It features a classic Italianate cast iron facade.

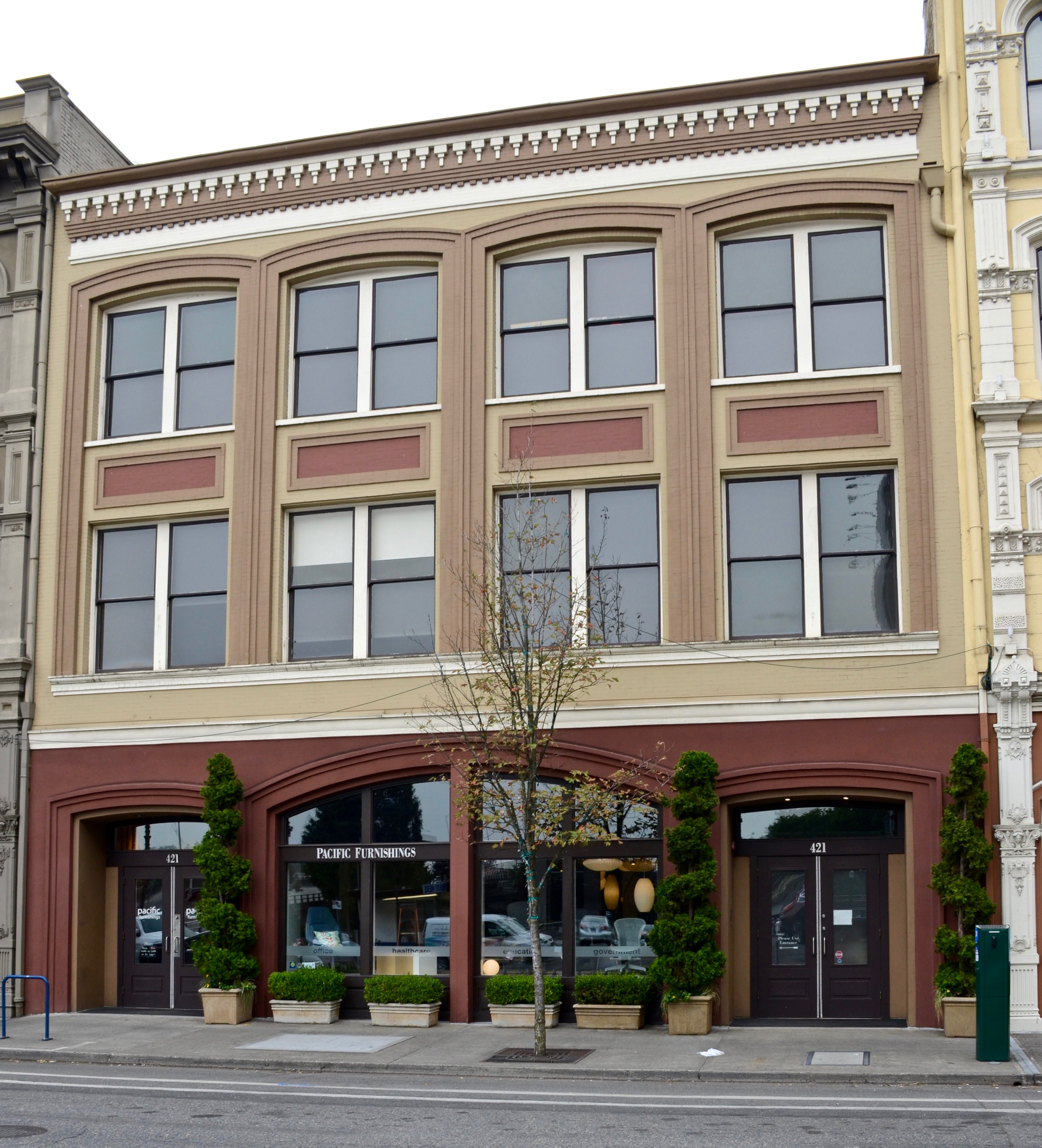
The commercial building adjacent to the Stable and Carriage Building, which is also part of the NRHP listing

The National Register listing also includes an 1894 commercial building located adjacent to the Grand Stable Building, to its south.

== See also ==
- Architecture in Portland, Oregon
- National Register of Historic Places listings in Southwest Portland, Oregon
