= Old Town Pizza =

Pizzeria in Portland, Oregon, U.S.

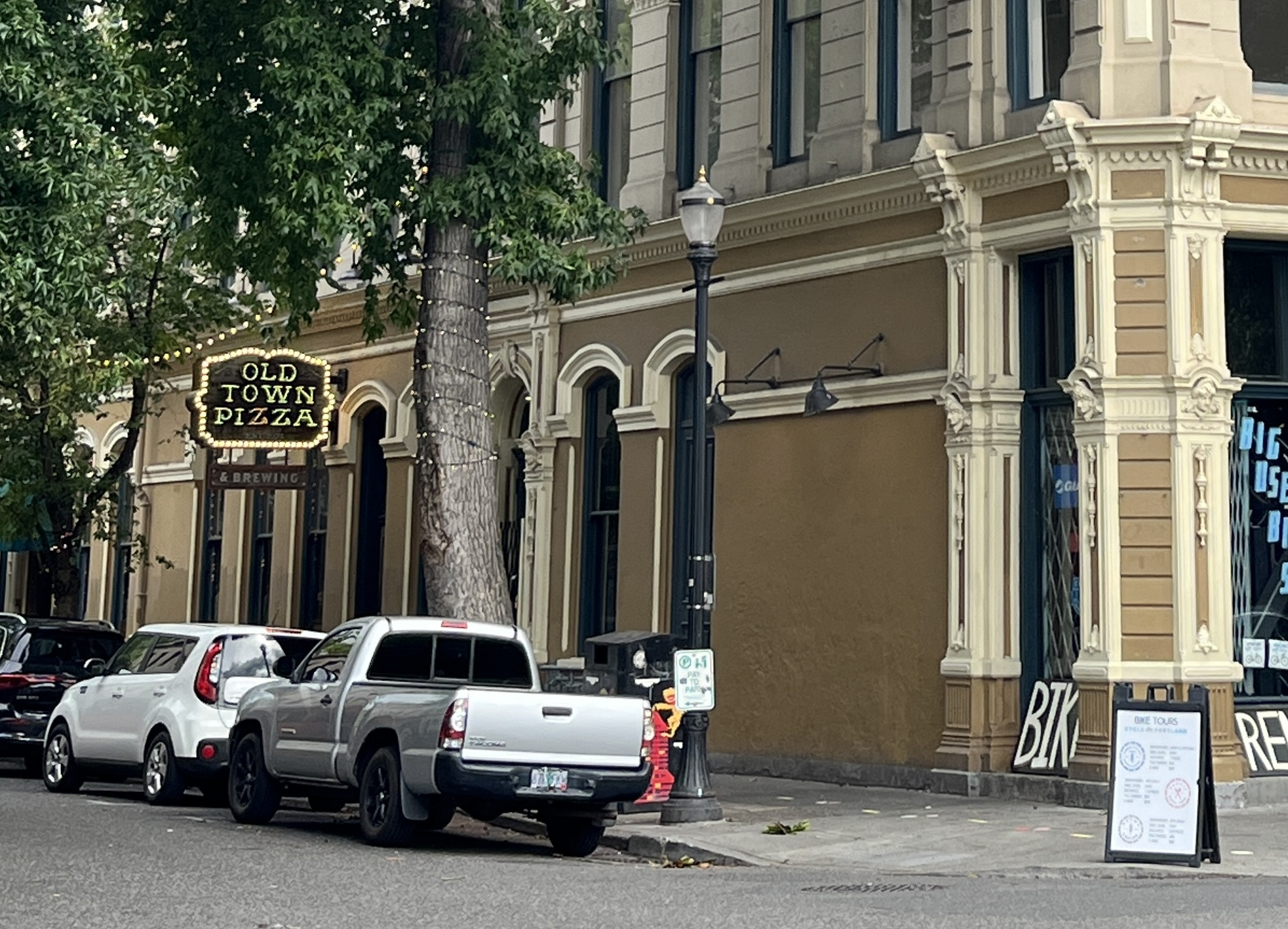
- The pizzeria's exterior in 2025
- Interactive map of Old Town Pizza

Restaurant information
- Established: 1974
- Food type: Pizza
- Dress code: Casual
- Location: 226 Northwest Davis Street, Portland, Oregon, Multnomah, Oregon, 97209, United States
- Coordinates: 45.52443°N 122.67302°W
- Reservations: No
- Other locations: 5201 Northeast Martin Luther King, Jr. Boulevard
- Website: oldtownpizza.com; otbrewing.com

Old Town Pizza is a pizzeria established in 1974 and located in the historic Merchant Hotel building in the Old Town Chinatown neighborhood of central Portland, Oregon in the United States. The company has a satellite location at Vanport Square in Northeast Portland that includes a brewery branded as Old Town Brewing Co. Two days before its March 2012 opening, a fire forced the restaurant to undergo reconstruction for six weeks.

== Description and history ==
Old Town Pizza was established in 1974 in the Merchant Hotel building in the Old Town Chinatown neighborhood of northwest Portland, Oregon. The restaurant's menu includes pizzas, paninis, pastas and salads.

=== Satellite restaurant and Old Town Brewing Co. ===
Old Town Pizza's satellite restaurant is located at 5201 Northeast Martin Luther King Jr. Boulevard at Vanport Square in Northeast Portland. Historically, the location was a hub for the automotive industry. The restaurant serves the same menu as the original location and features a similar "rustic-feeling atmosphere", plus a full bar.

The Northeast Portland restaurant was set to launch its seven-barrel brewery, branded as Old Town Brewing Co., in mid-March 2012. However, two days before the opening, a fire believed to have been started by prolonged contact between a light bulb and lampshade resulted in more than $50,000 in damage. The restaurant was closed for reconstruction for more than six weeks, during which repairs costing over $300,000 were completed. Following an April 27 reopening, the restaurant began serving eight beers, including an American wheat, an India Pale Ale, an Irish red, a pale ale, a porter, S.T.E.A.M., a stout and a winter ale. S.T.E.A.M. was developed in collaboration with Rock Bottom Brewery during Old Town's six-week closure and was served by both companies.

== Reception ==
Old Town Pizza has been featured on Rachael Ray's Tasty Travels, a series hosted by celebrity chef and television personality Rachael Ray, The Tonight Show and the Travel Channel. Portland Monthly recommended the original restaurant as a good place to start or end an evening. The magazine published about the restaurant: "There's something so McCabe & Mrs. Miller about eating in a warm, wooden room. And indeed, much of the allure of Old Town Pizza is the architecture." The Old Town Chinatown Community Association included the Northwest Portland restaurant in a self-guided tour of the neighborhood.

== See also ==
- List of breweries in Oregon
- Pizza in Portland, Oregon
