= Rachael Ray's Kids Cook-Off =

- Genre: Cooking, reality television
- Presented by: Rachael Ray
- Country of origin: United States
- Original language: English

Original release
- Network: Food Network
- Release: 2015

Rachael Ray's Kids Cook-Off is a Food Network reality competition that premiered in August 2015. The format of the show is a cookoff with eight child contestants.

Each week one kid is eliminated after participating in two cook-offs. The winner of the first competition gets immunity from elimination. After the second competition one of the remaining children in eliminated. The winner will get a $20,000 cash price toward their culinary education and their own web series on the Food Network web site.
