= Morris Marks House =

Historic building in Portland, Oregon, U.S.

- U.S. National Register of Historic Places
- Portland Historic Landmark
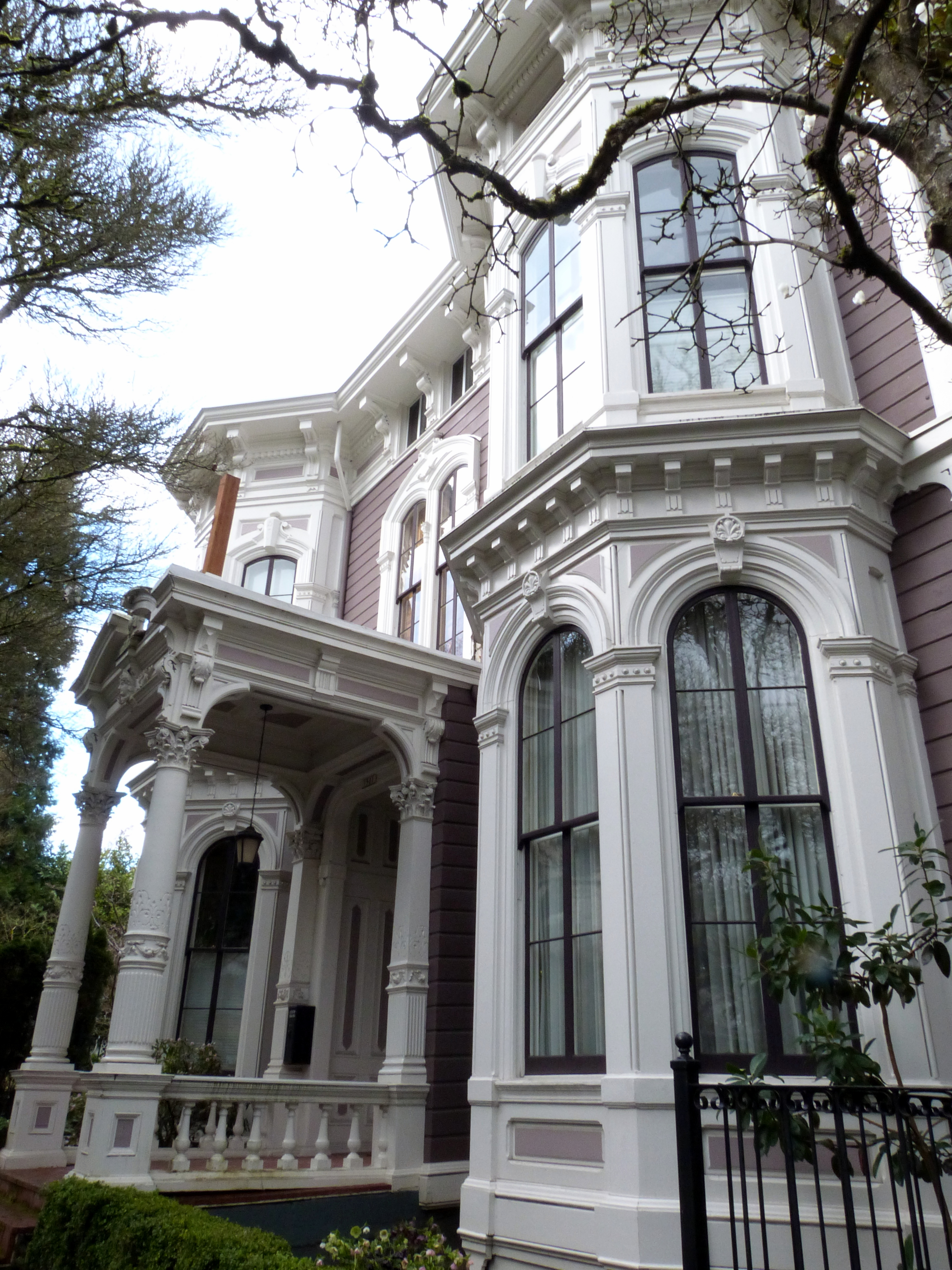
- The Marks House in 2013.

- Location within Portland, Oregon
- Location: 1501 SW Harrison Street; Portland, Oregon
- Coordinates: 45.513550°N 122.691551°W
- Area: 0.2 acres (0.081 ha)
- Built: 1882
- Architect: Warren Heywood Williams
- Architectural style: Italianate
- NRHP reference No.: 75001596
- Added to NRHP: December 30, 1975

The Morris Marks House is a house located in southwest Portland, Oregon listed on the National Register of Historic Places. It is located in the Goose Hollow neighborhood, just southwest of downtown Portland. Designed by Portland architect Warren Heywood Williams in an Italianate style, the house was built for Morris Marks, a Portland shoe merchant of Polish descent, in 1882. It was originally located at S.W. 11th Avenue and Clay Street, but in the early 1900s was moved to 1501 S.W. Harrison Street, where it has remained ever since.

Prior to owning this house, Marks owned another house in Portland that was also designed by Warren Williams, also in an Italianate style, but was somewhat smaller. It was built in 1880. That house, once located at 1134 S.W. 12th Avenue in downtown Portland, but cut in half and moved to a very small lot at S.W. Broadway and Grant in 2017, has been vacant and boarded-up for several years, and is not listed on the National Register.

== See also ==
- National Register of Historic Places listings in Southwest Portland, Oregon
