= Portland Skidmore/Old Town Historic District =

Historic district in Portland, Oregon, U.S.

Coordinates: 45.5224°N 122.6713°W

- U.S. National Register of Historic Places
- U.S. National Historic Landmark District
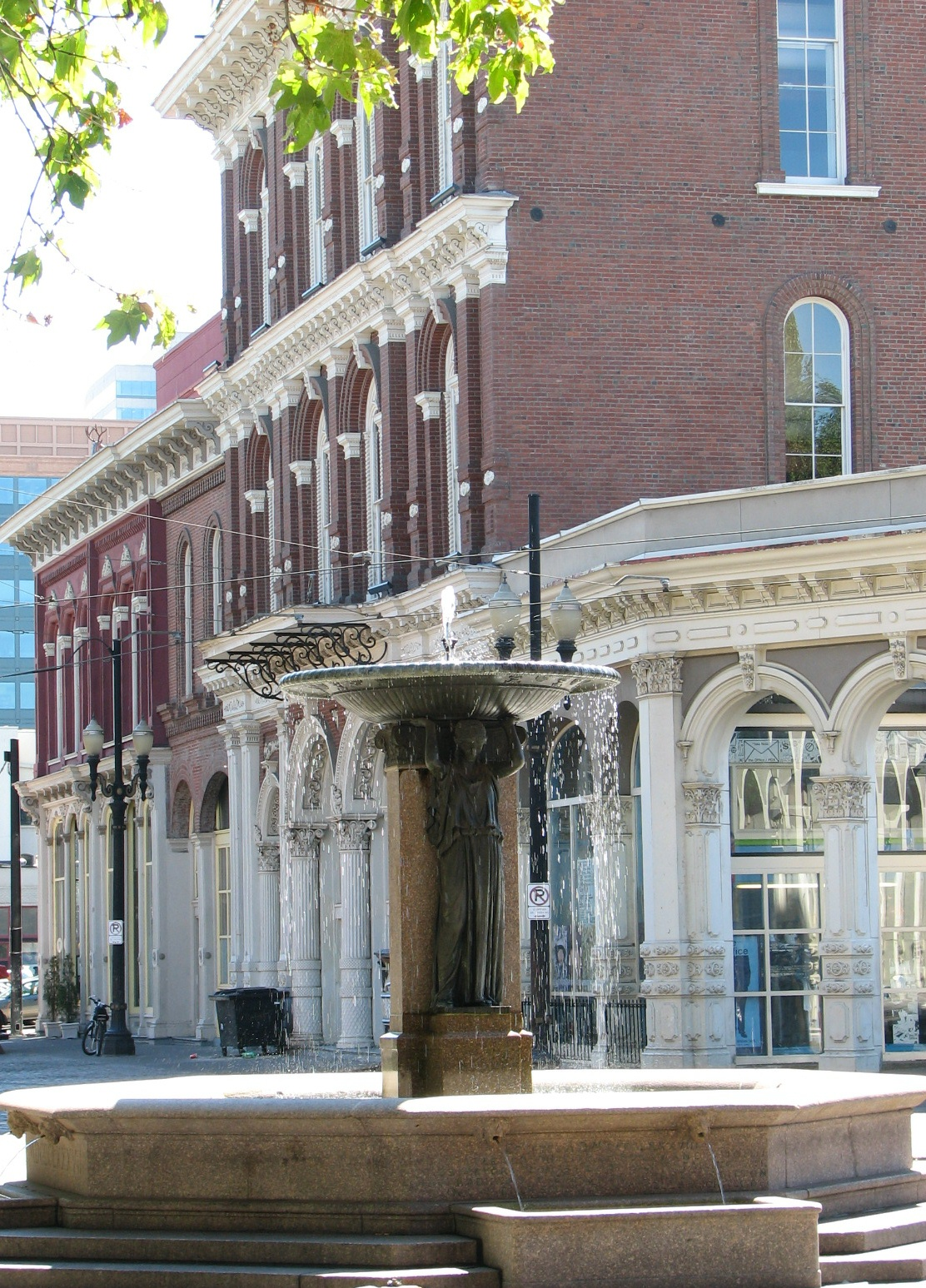
- Skidmore Fountain, and the New Market Block in the background
- Location: Roughly bounded by Naito Parkway, Everett, 3rd, and Oak streets., Portland, Oregon
- Area: 440 acres (180 ha)
- Built: Approx. 1871-1914
- Architect: multiple
- Architectural style: Late 19th and Early 20th Century American Movements, Late Victorian, Italianate
- NRHP reference No.: 75001597

Significant dates
- Added to NRHP: December 6, 1975
- Designated NHLD: May 5, 1977; October 6, 2008 (additional NHL documentation approved)

The Portland Skidmore/Old Town Historic District is a historic district in Portland, Oregon's Old Town Chinatown neighborhood. The area, which encompasses approximately 20 blocks and is centered around Burnside Street, is named after the Skidmore Fountain. It is known for its High Victorian Italianate, Renaissance Revival, Richardsonian Romanesque, and Sullivanesque architectural styles. In addition to Skidmore Fountain, the district also contains the Blagen Block, the Delschneider, Hallock and McMillin, New Market Alley, and Poppleton buildings as well as the New Market Annex and New Market Theater.

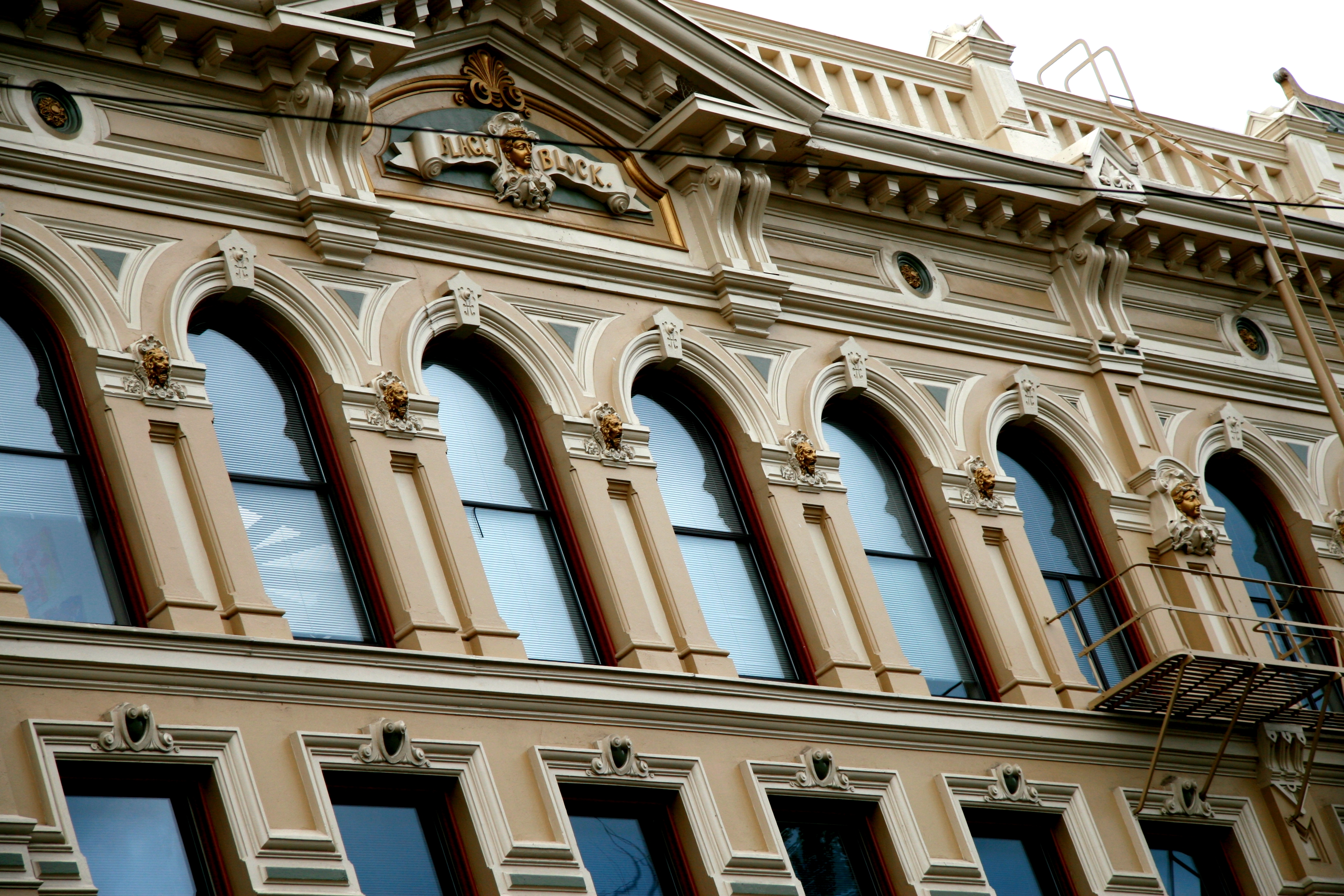
Blagen Block

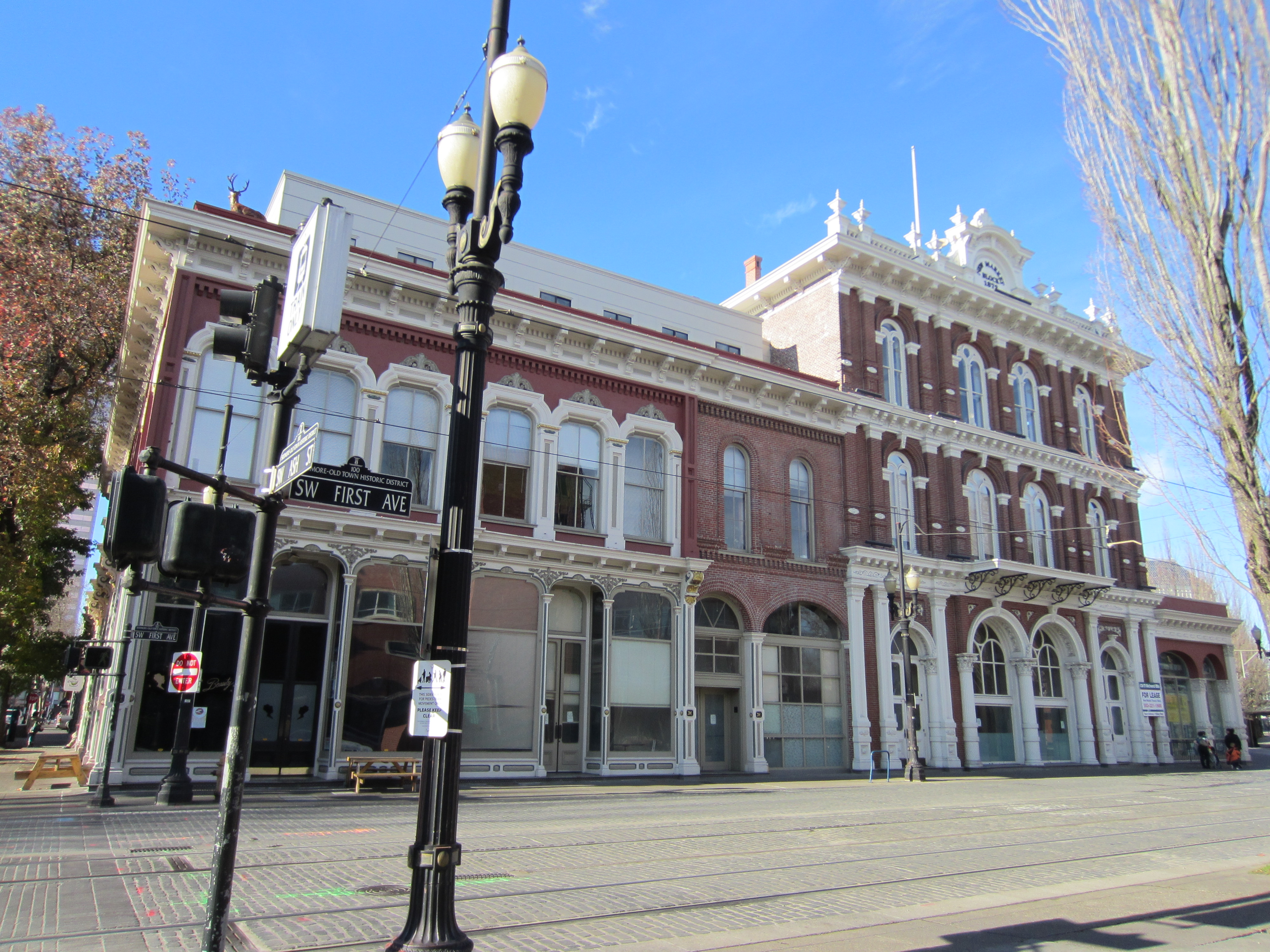
New Market Block and Annex

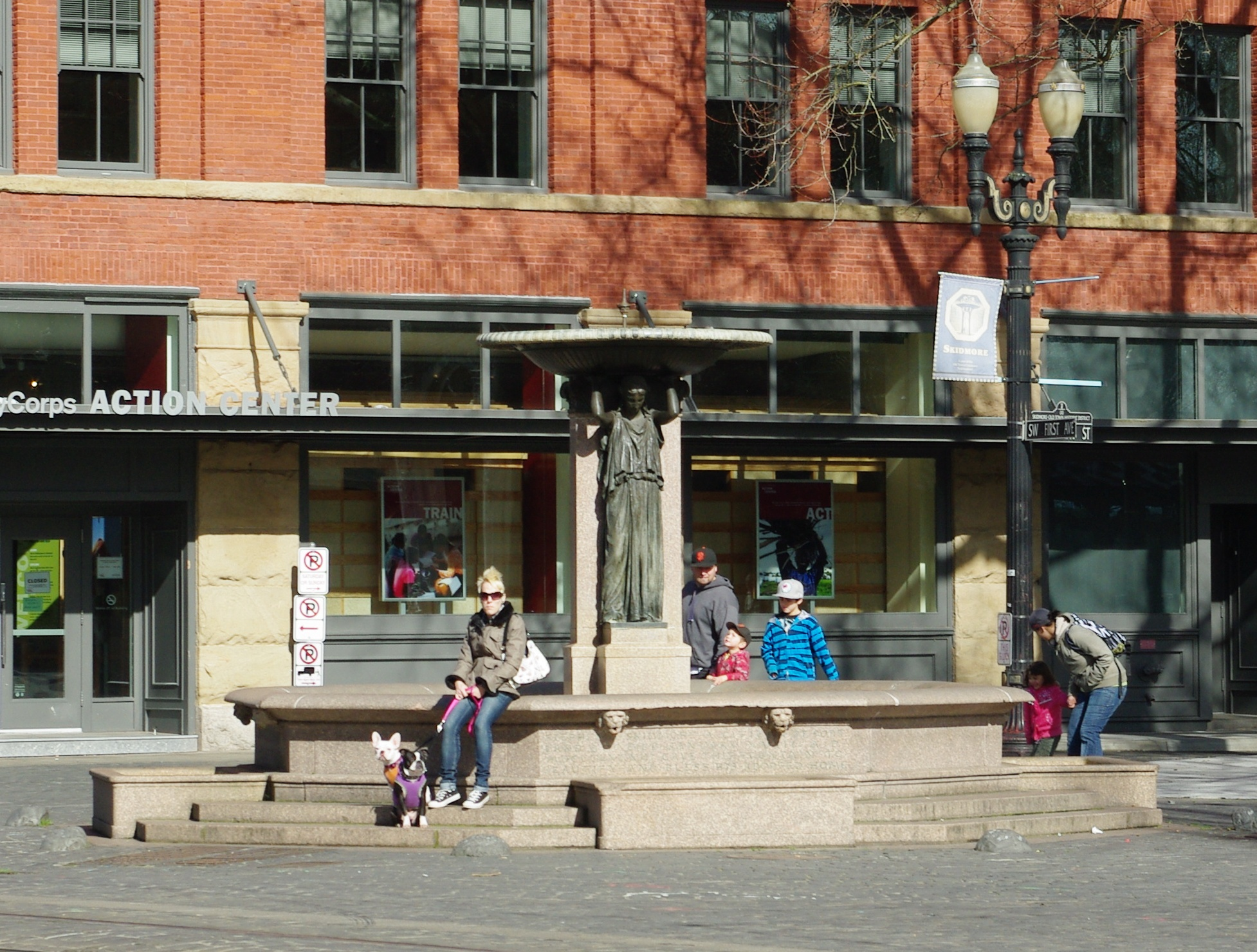
Skidmore Fountain

== See also ==
- List of National Historic Landmarks in Oregon
- List of Oregon's Most Endangered Places
- National Register of Historic Places listings in Northwest Portland, Oregon
- National Register of Historic Places listings in South and Southwest Portland, Oregon
- Portland New Chinatown/Japantown Historic District
