= 45th Parallel (organization) =

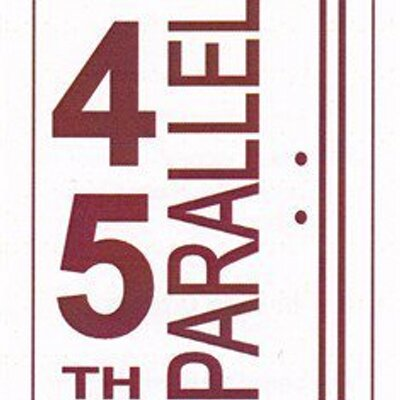
- Logo

Background information
- Origin: Portland, Oregon, United States
- Years active: 2009 – present
- Website: 45thparallelpdx.org

45th Parallel is a nonprofit organization and chamber music group based in Portland, Oregon in the United States. Founded in 2009 by artistic director Gregory Ewer, the group produces and presents chamber music concerts featuring Pacific Northwest musicians and occasional guest artists.

== Description ==
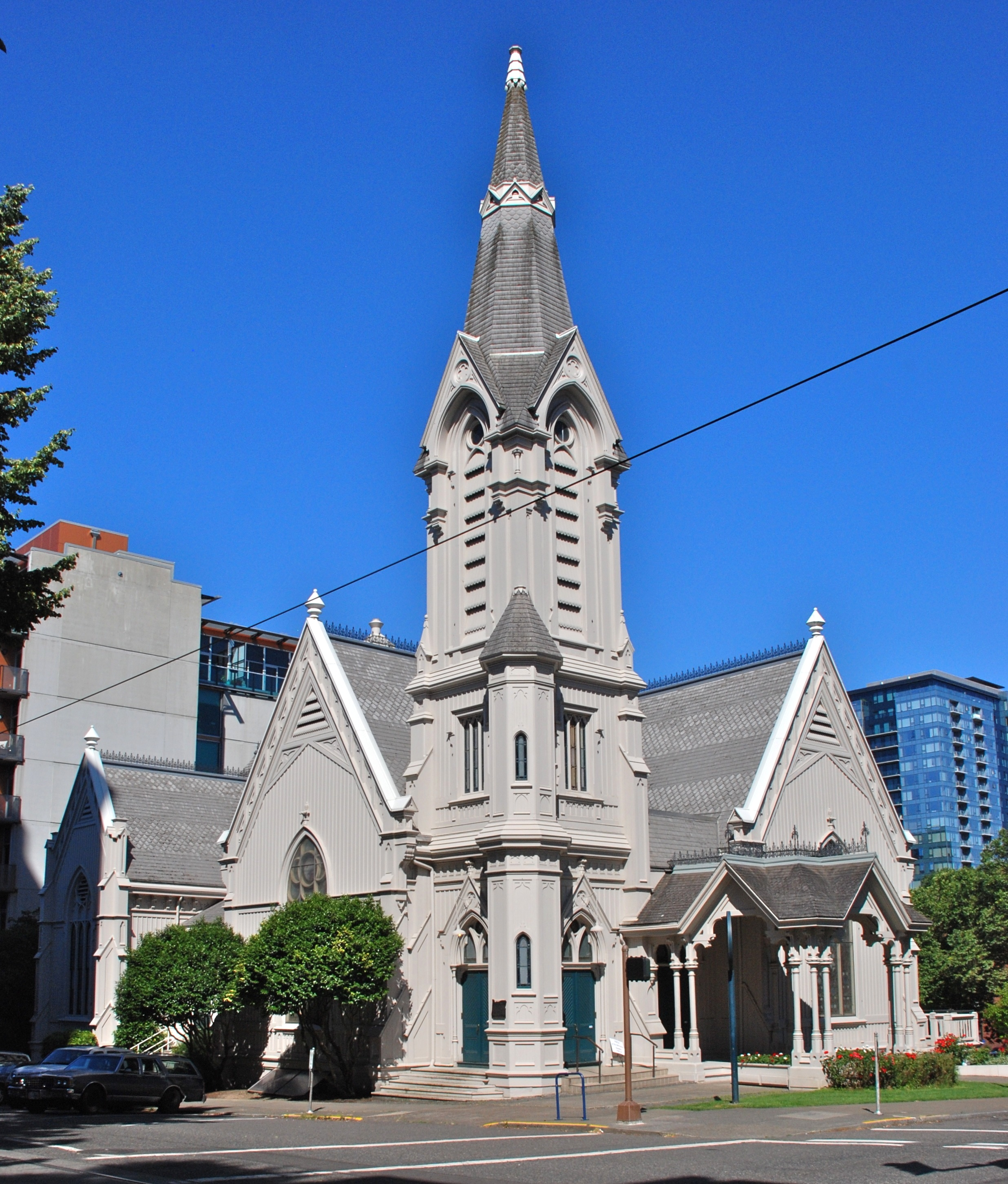
The Old Church often hosts 45th Parallel performances.

45th Parallel is a nonprofit organization and chamber music performance group based in Portland, Oregon. The group was founded in 2009 by Gregory Ewer, a violinist for the Oregon Symphony, out of a love for chamber music and his desire to collaborate with Pacific Northwest musicians. Ewer continues to serve as artistic director of 45th Parallel. The group often performs at The Old Church, which Ewer described as "Portland's musical living room/recital hall", ideal for intimate concerts.

Concerts are often accompanied with receptions that allow interaction between performers and audience members. According to Ewer, "This was a priority of [his] from the start. It's part of what distinguishes 45th Parallel. We are not superheroes. We are the folks that our audience members shop with, have a beer with and meet on the street. That's the atmosphere that 45th Parallel is trying to create."

== Performances ==
The 2011–2012 season opening concert included Antonín Dvořák's String Quintet No. 3 (Opus 97) and Felix Mendelssohn's B-flat Quintet (Opus 87). Guests included Nancy Ives and Justin Kagan on cello, Hillary Schoap on viola, and Ron Blessinger and Ines Voglar. The January performance, which Ewer said could have been called "Music Among Friends", included guests Hamilton Cheifetz, Janet Coleman and Angela Niederloh. The April concert served as a tribute to violinist Sergiu Luca, the founder of Chamber Music Northwest who was also one of Ewer's teachers and mentors. The program included William Bolcom's "Graceful Ghost Rag" and a composition by Christian Sinding, among other "favorites" of Luca's. The second half of the concert featured jazz violinist James Mason and members of the band Swing Papillon as guest artists, performing a tribute to Joe Venuti. The season's final performance included works by Johann Sebastian Bach and György Ligeti. Guests artists included Irish fiddler Kevin Burke, guitarist Cal Scott, and French violinist Gilles Apap.

The 2012–2013 season included guest artist and violinist Ida Haendel, who performed a sonata by her instructor George Enescu with pianist Misha Dacic, plus additional works by Ernest Bloch and Robert Schumann. "An Evening with Ida Haendel" was co-presented by KQAC and held at The Old Church.

The 2013–2014 season included a program called "Dynamic Duo", featuring Sarah Kwak, concertmaster for the Oregon Symphony, and pianist Cary Lewis. Additional concerts will include: "Quartets with Guts!", with music by Ludwig van Beethoven, Joseph Haydn and Wolfgang Amadeus Mozart; an American music-themed concert called "Superbowl Saturday" featuring the bluegrass band Jackstraw; and "Transfigured Night", which will include the Arnold Schoenberg piece of the same name plus works by Johannes Brahms and Peter Maxwell Davies. Performance venues include The Old Church, Grace Memorial Episcopal Church, and Alberta Rose Theatre.

== Reception ==
According to Ewer, concerts during the first two seasons averaged more than 200 attendees.

== See also ==
- Culture of Portland, Oregon
