= Shanghai tunnels =

Tunnel system in Portland, US

Coordinates: 45.524°N 122.673°W

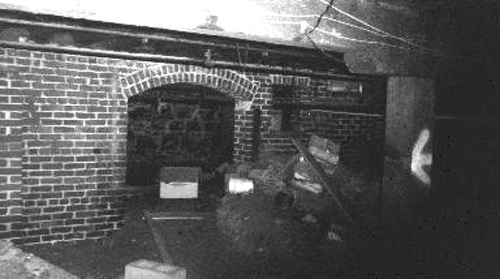
Part of the tunnels

The Old Portland Underground, better known locally as the Shanghai tunnels, is a group of passages in Portland, Oregon, United States, mainly underneath the Old Town Chinatown neighborhood and connecting to the main business section. The tunnels connected the basements of many hotels and taverns to the waterfront of the Willamette River. They were built to move goods from the ships docked on the Willamette to the basement storage areas, allowing businesses to avoid streetcar and train traffic on the streets when delivering their goods.

The newspapers of the 19th century document tunnels and secret passages underground. Organized crime was the center of many of these stories. However, many of the more colorful stories claimed for the underground are highly dubious. Historians have stated that although the tunnels exist and shanghaiing (kidnapping people to serve as sailors) was often practiced in Portland, as elsewhere, there is no evidence that the tunnels were used for this.

In his book The Oregon Shanghaiers, Portland historian Barney Blalock traces the notion that the tunnels were used to shanghai sailors to a series of apocryphal stories by writer Stewart Holbrook that appeared in the newspaper The Oregonian in 1962, and the subsequent popularity of "Shanghai tunnel" tours by Portland historian Michael P. Jones that began in the 1970s. He says the tours were popular but misled visitors.

In 1990, local businessman Bill Naito was quoted in The Oregonian as saying that the tunnels are underneath "Northwest Couch, Davis and Everett streets".

The "Shanghai tunnels" are referenced many times in the urban fantasy police procedural drama television series Grimm.

== See also ==
- Vault lights, tunnel illumination
- Seattle Underground
