= The Old Church (Portland, Oregon) =

Historic church building in Portland, Oregon, U.S.

- Calvary Presbyterian Church
- U.S. National Register of Historic Places
- Portland Historic Landmark
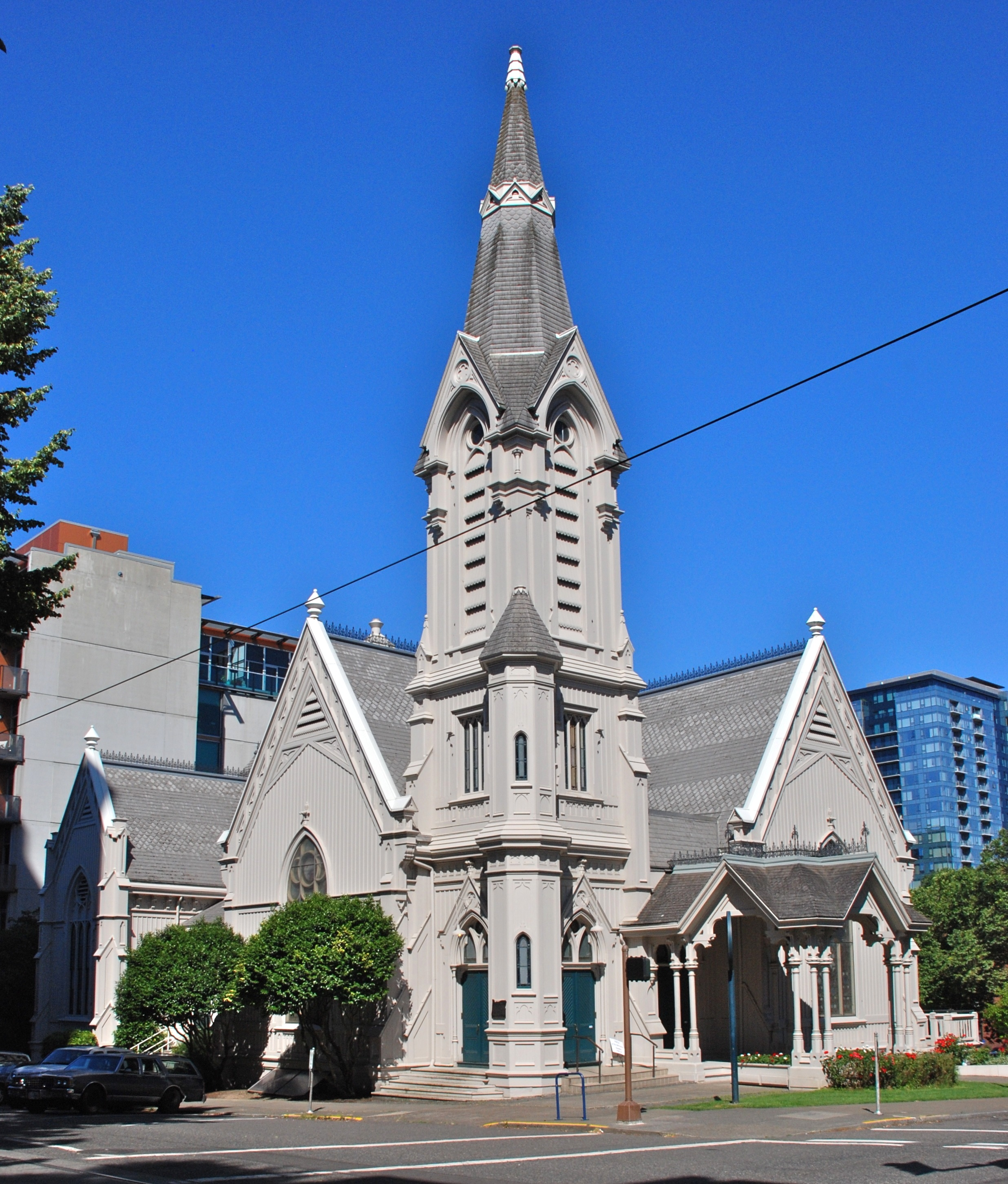
- The Old Church in 2011

- Location within Portland, Oregon
- Location: 1422 SW 11th Avenue; Portland, Oregon
- Coordinates: 45°30′55″N 122°41′08″W
- Built: 1882
- Built by: W. F. Lewis
- Architect: Warren Heywood Williams
- Architectural style: Gothic, High Victorian Gothic
- NRHP reference No.: 72001086
- Added to NRHP: March 29, 1972

The Old Church, originally known as Calvary Presbyterian Church, is a Carpenter Gothic church located in downtown Portland, Oregon, United States, that is listed on the National Register of Historic Places. Built in 1882, it was designed by Portland architect Warren Heywood Williams. The interior includes stained glass windows made by Portland's Povey Brothers Studio.

== History ==
The building's use as the Calvary Presbyterian Church ceased in 1948, when it was sold to the Evangel Baptist Church. Another Baptist congregation, First Southern Baptist (later becoming Metropolitan Baptist) purchased the building in 1951. It became unused in 1965 and was put up for sale, but remained unsold for an extended period, and its demolition was planned. In 1967, the non-profit group Old Church was formed with the intent of preserving the building. After a one-year fundraising campaign the group purchased the building from Metropolitan Baptist Church on April 1, 1969, for $95,000. At its next meeting, Old Church Inc. changed its name to the Old Church Society. Initial efforts to save and preserve the building were led by Lannie Hurst, an actress and performer. The Oregon Journal chose Hurst as one of 10 "Women of Accomplishment" in 1969, explaining that "Few fundraising campaigns of any sort ever captured the imagination and support of Portlanders as completely as did the drive to save The Old Church..." The building was added to the National Register of Historic Places in 1972, under its original name of Calvary Presbyterian Church.

The Old Church is a non-profit that focuses on restoring and preserving the structure and providing artistic and cultural programming. Restoration work has included major interior and exterior overhauls that have aimed to preserve the historic character of the building while adding modern conveniences to keep the space relevant and useful. During the restoration, Jerry Bosco and Ben Milligan, prominent collectors of historic artifacts, donated the original porte-cochère to The Old Church. Most recently The Old Church installed a new stage, bar, and marquee and state-of-the-art sound and lighting systems. Since 1969, The Old Church has hosted free weekly lunch-time concerts on Wednesdays and it hosts concerts by touring and local artists. The space is also used for weddings and other events.

== See also ==
- Culture of Portland, Oregon
- National Register of Historic Places listings in Southwest Portland, Oregon
- Religion in Portland, Oregon
