= OTP Ingatlanpont =

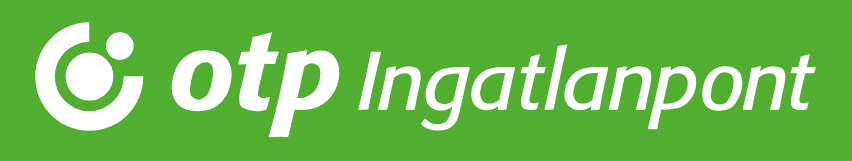
- Company type: Limited company
- Industry: Real Estate
- Founded: 2011; 15 years ago
- Headquarters: Budapest, Hungary
- Number of locations: 70 (2018)
- Area served: Hungary
- Key people: Dr Balázs Hartlieb
- Services: Property sales Appraisal and valuation Property leasing Tenant representation Strategic consulting
- Net income: ▲HUF 2,157 billion (2017)
- Owner: OTP Bank Group
- Website: www.otpip.hu

OTP Ingatlanpont (officially OTP Ingatlanpont Ingatlanközvetítő Kft also known as OTP IP) is a Hungarian real estate brokerage firm based in Budapest, Hungary. It operates 70 offices and serves clients through its 700 brokers in the whole country. OTP Ingatlanpont offers a broad range of integrated services, including property sales, appraisal and valuation, property leasing, tenant representation, strategic consulting and through its parent bank, the OTP Bank also mortgage services and property loans.

The company is since its founding in 2011 part of the OTP Bank Group.

== History ==
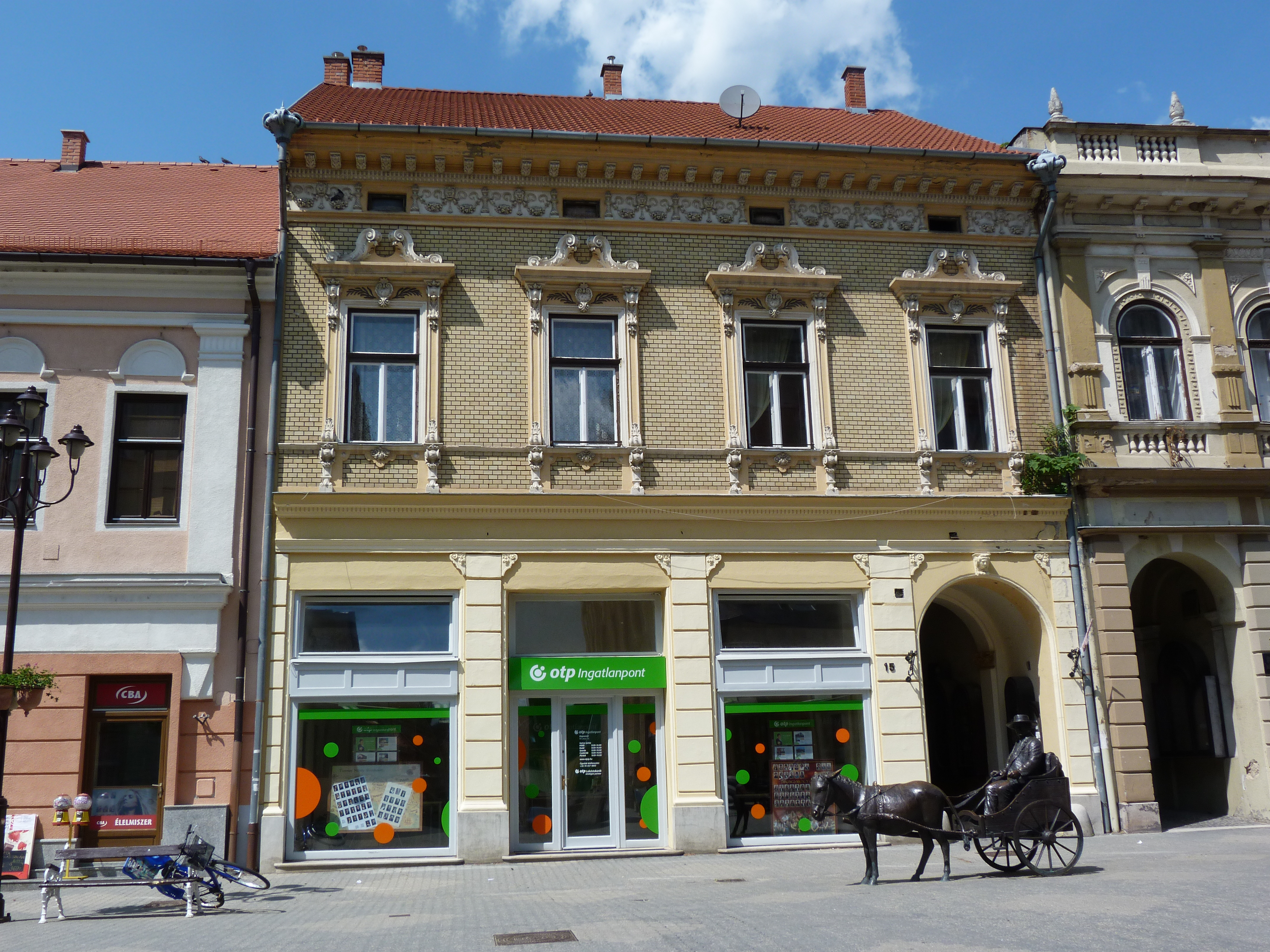
Branch office in Kaposvár, Somogy County.

The company was founded in 2011 in Budapest, Hungary.

OTP Ingatlanpont changed to digital administration in December 2018 accompanied by the introduction of its newly designed client-oriented web interface.

== See also ==
- OTP Bank Group
