= 30 Minute Meals =

US television program

- Created by: Mark Dissin
- Starring: Rachael Ray
- Theme music composer: Lionel Cartwright
- Country of origin: United States

Production
- Executive producers: Mark Dissin and Bob Tuschman
- Running time: 30 minutes

Original release
- Network: Food Network
- Release: November 17, 2001 – November 9, 2019

30 Minute Meals is a Food Network television series hosted by Rachael Ray. Her first of four shows on Food Network, its original run aired from November 17, 2001, until May 5, 2012. The show specializes in convenience cooking for those with little time to cook. The show is recorded live-to-tape, with Ray doing almost all preparation in real time. The show was awarded an Emmy for Best Daytime Service Show in 2006.

A common feature on the program is the creation of new versions of classic dishes like clam chowder or macaroni and cheese, some of which are traditionally slow to cook. Ray focuses on creating meals in less than 30 minutes. Ray has also done two specials with the title Thanksgiving in 60, about preparing a Thanksgiving dinner in one hour.

Each episode Ray opens the show by saying "Hi there, I'm Rachael Ray and I make 30-minute meals. Now that means in the time it takes you to watch this program, I will have made a delicious and healthy meal from start to finish."

A 30-episode revival was announced on January 25, 2019 and began airing on April 1, 2019.

== About the show ==
Rachael Ray's 30 Minute Meals, based on the cookbook series, debuted on November 17, 2001, and went on hiatus in 2012 for 7 years, then was revived in 2019. After writing and releasing her cookbook in 1999, Rachael Ray went on NBC's Today to make soup with Al Roker. Two weeks later, she had two pilot shows on TV.

== Criticism of the show ==
Criticism of Rachael Ray's show has been levied despite its successes. Ray had no formal cooking experience, leading to complaints about the appearance of her food.

Charlie Dougiello, Ray's director of publicity stated, "Rachael always says that some of the criticisms of her as a chef are correct. She is not a chef. She whips up meals in a way some chefs would cringe at. If she slips up, she slips up. We don't stop taping. It is just like life."

== Books ==
The TV series has also led to a group of cookbooks published by Lake Isle Press.

Since the original 30 Minute Meals: Comfort Foods came out, several other books have also been published:

Book Title
30 Minute Meals: Veggie Meals
30 Minute Meals (1)
30 Minute Meals 2
30 Minute Meals: Cooking Around the Clock
30 Minute Meals: Get Togethers

Book Title
30 Minute Meals: 365, A Year of Deliciously Different Dinners
Cooking Rocks!: 30 Minute Meals for Kids!
Two additional titles coming soon
