= Warren Heywood Williams =

American architect

- Born: 1844; New York, New York
- Died: January 1888 (aged 43–44)
- Occupation: Architect
- Practice: Warren Heywood Williams & Justus Krumbein; Warren Heywood Williams & E.M. Burton

Warren Heywood Williams (1844 in New York City – January 1888) was an American architect, who spent most of his career working in the U.S. state of Oregon. Starting in 1860, he apprenticed in San Francisco as a draftsman at the architectural firm of his father, Stephen H. Williams, and Henry W. Cleaveland. Warren Heywood Williams and his wife, Christina (c. 1847–1929), had two sons who became architects, Warren Franklin Williams (died 1917) and David Lochead Williams (born September 2, 1866).

Williams worked as an architect from 1869 to 1887. He worked with his father in the firm then named S.H. Williams & Son, while the elder and younger Williams were both living in San Francisco. In January 1873, Warren Williams moved with his wife and three children to Portland, Oregon. From then until mid-1874, he was partners in an architecture firm with E.M. Burton. Subsequently, Williams partnered with Justus Krumbein from 1875 to 1878. Williams was an architect of cast-iron buildings in the United States and Canada.

Williams died of pneumonia in January 1888.

== Works ==
Building	Year Completed	Builder	Style	Location	Image
S.E. Young home	1800s	Warren Heywood Williams	Queen Anne Style	Albany, Oregon	
Masonic Temple	1800s	Warren Heywood Williams	Queen Anne Style	Eugene, Oregon	
Merchants' Hotel	1880	Warren Heywood Williams	Second Empire	Portland, Oregon	
Calvary Presbyterian Church (The Old Church)	1882	Warren Heywood Williams & builder W. F. Lewis	High Victorian Gothic Carpenter Gothic	Portland, Oregon	
Morris Marks House	1882	Warren Heywood Williams	Italianate Cast Iron - Commercial	Portland, Oregon	
Richard Knapp House	1882 (Demolished)	William F. Mcaw	Queen Anne	Portland, Oregon	
James McNaught House	1884-5 (Demolished)	Warren Heywood Williams	Italianate	Seattle, Washington	
Bank of British Columbia	1885	Warren Heywood Williams	Italianate	Victoria, British Columbia	
Deady and Villard Halls, University of Oregon	1885	Warren Heywood Williams	Second Empire	University of Oregon Eugene, Oregon	
Grand Stable and Carriage Building	1887	Warren Heywood Williams	Carpenter Gothic	Portland, Oregon	
Flavel Block	1887-8 (Destroyed 1922)	George Flavel	Victorian	Astoria, Oregon	
Temple Beth Israel, Portland	1889	Warren Heywood Williams	Moorish Byzantine	Portland, Oregon	
Craigdarroch Castle	1890	Warren Heywood Williams & Arthur L. Smith	Victorian-era Châteauesque	Victoria, British Columbia	

== See also ==
- National Register of Historic Places listings in Southwest Portland, Oregon
