= Poppleton Building =

Historic building in Portland, Oregon, U.S.

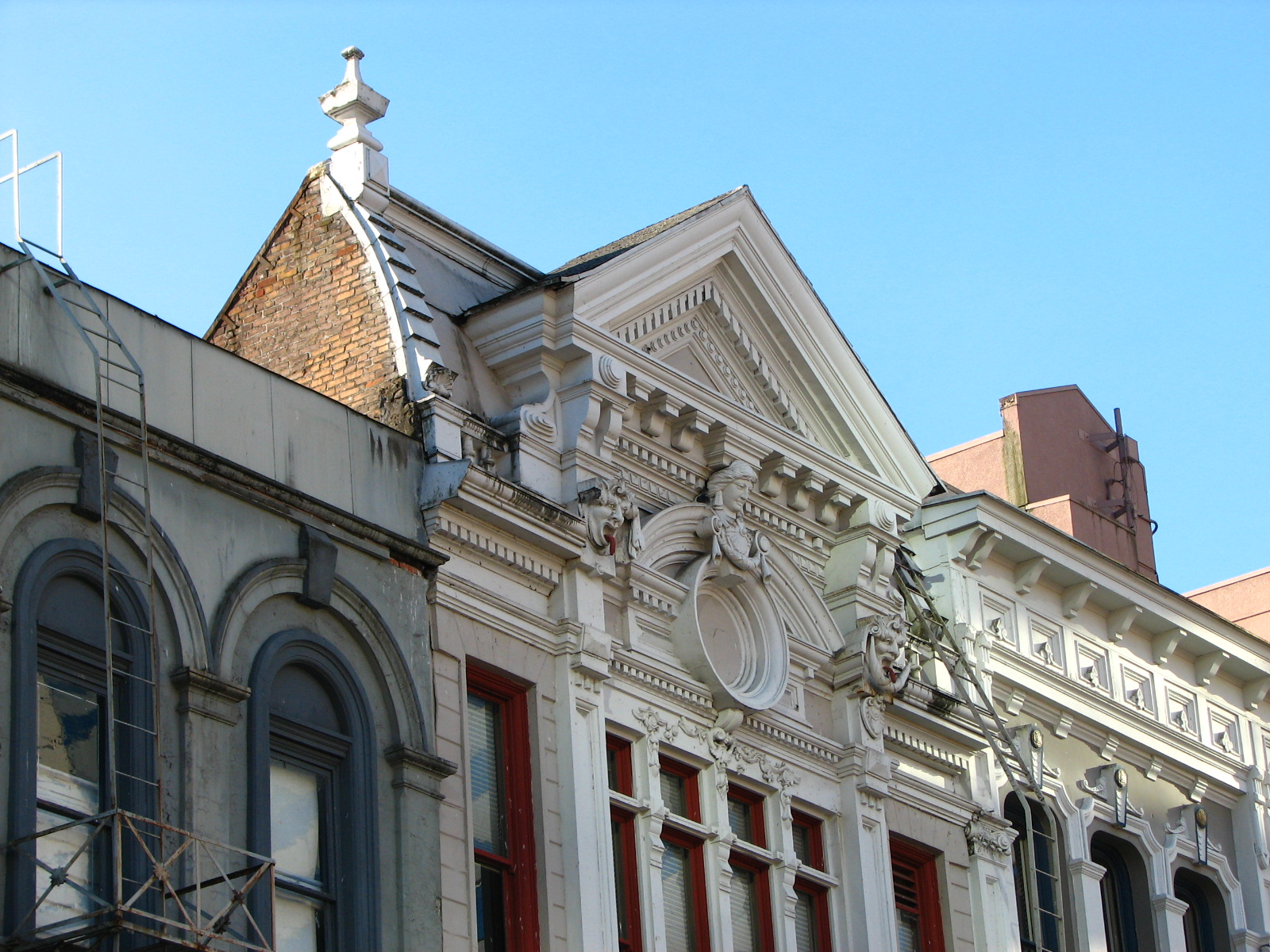
- Detail of the building's exterior in 2008
- Interactive map of the Poppleton Building area

General information
- Location: Portland, Oregon, United States
- Coordinates: 45°31′0.3″N 122°40′26.2″W

The Poppleton Building is an historic building in Portland, Oregon's Yamhill Historic District. The structure was completed in 1867. In 1873, it was destroyed in a large fire, along with the neighboring Pearne building and many other historic cast iron structures throughout Portland. Both the Pearne and Poppleton buildings were rebuilt using their original columns.
