= Rachael Ray's Tasty Travels =

- Genre: Cooking
- Created by: Rachael Ray; Wade Sheeler
- Written by: Kristine A. Tata; Don Colliver; Lisa Clinard; Stephen Guerrieri; Jennifer MacLean; Lesley Mayer
- Directed by: Adjani Vivas; Wade Sheeler
- Starring: Rachael Ray
- Original language: English
- No. of seasons: 5
- No. of episodes: 56

Production
- Executive producers: Rachael Ray; Tara Sandler; Scott Templeton; Robb Weller; Steve Lange; Jennifer Davidson; Gary H. Grossman; Wade Sheeler
- Cinematography: Jeff Doser; Mark Daniels; Forrest Stangel; Frederic Menou; Stan McMeekin
- Editors: Kathie Burr; Javier Fuentes Leon
- Running time: 30 minutes
- Production companies: Pie Town Productions; Weller/Grossman Productions; High Noon Entertainment

Original release
- Network: Food Network
- Release: August 26, 2005 – 2006

Related
- $40 a Day

Rachael Ray's Tasty Travels is a television show based on cook Rachael Ray and her travels around the world. The show is similar to her 2002 Food Network show, $40 a Day, however she is not restricted by a budget and showcases food from more upscale eateries. She tries different types of food from each place she visits, and gives a "Hot List of Values", which includes some of her favorite places visited from $40 a Day. The show airs on the Food Network and is her fourth Food Network program. It first aired on August 26, 2005. She provides voiceovers for most of the show and is shown at only one or two places. Her husband, John Cusimano, usually accompanies her at the one or two restaurants she visits per episode. The show was developed with Producer Wade Sheeler following the success of her first travel show on Food Network, $40 a Day.

Forty-one episodes were produced during the series' first two years; Ray stated on a September 7, 2007 appearance on Late Show with David Letterman that she had just completed work on twenty additional episodes, which had begun airing the previous week.
