= Rachael Ray =

American television host (born 1968)

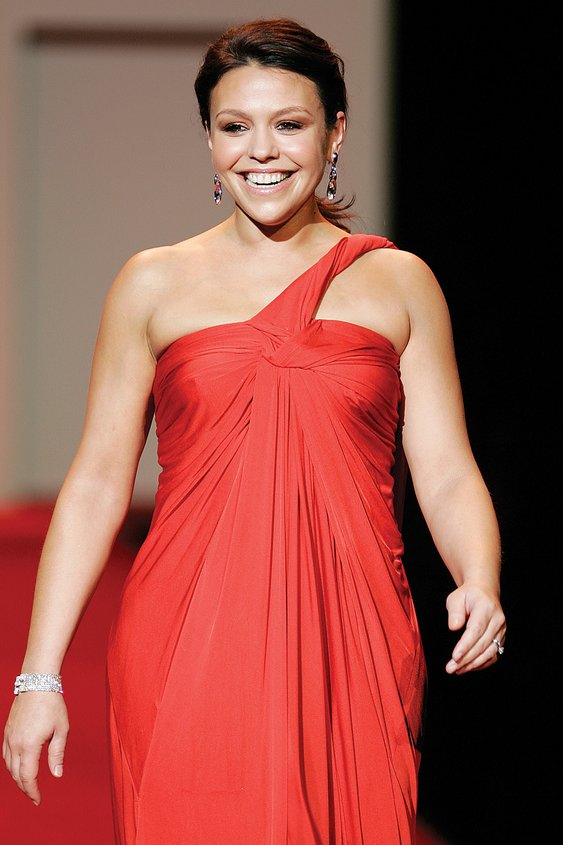
- Ray in 2007
- Born: Rachael Domenica Ray; August 25, 1968 (age 58); Glens Falls, New York, U.S.
- Occupations: Television host, businesswoman, author, celebrity cook
- Years active: 1996–present
- Spouse: John Cusimano (m. 2005)
- Culinary career
- Television shows
- Rachael Ray; 30 Minute Meals; Rachael Ray's Tasty Travels; $40 a Day; Rachael vs. Guy: Celebrity Cook-Off; Rachael Ray's Kids Cook-Off; Rachael Ray's Week in a Day
- Website: rachaelray.com

Rachael Domenica Ray (born August 25, 1968) is an American cook, television personality, businesswoman, and author. She hosted the syndicated daily talk and lifestyle program Rachael Ray. Other programs to her credit include 30 Minute Meals, Rachael Ray's Tasty Travels, $40 a Day, Rachael Ray's Week in a Day, and the reality format shows Rachael vs. Guy: Celebrity Cook-Off and Rachael Ray's Kids Cook-Off. Ray has written several cookbooks based on the 30 Minute Meals concept, and launched a magazine, Every Day with Rachael Ray, in 2006. Ray's television shows have won three Daytime Emmy Awards.

== Early life, family and education ==
Rachael Domenica Ray was born in Glens Falls, New York, the daughter of Elsa Providenza Scuderi and James Claude Ray. Her mother's ancestry is Sicilian and her father is French, Scottish, and Welsh.

When Ray was eight years old, her family moved to Lake George, New York. Her mother managed restaurants in New York's Capital District, including the Lake George Howard Johnson's restaurant, located near the former Gaslight Village amusement park, which attracted many entertainers. Ray also briefly worked at Sutton's Marketplace in Queensbury, New York, and later offered to do commercials for the business. She would continue to promote the establishment, especially their cider donuts and grilled raisin bread. She graduated from Lake George Junior/Senior High School.

== Career ==
In 1995, Ray moved to New York City. She worked first at the Macy's Marketplace candy counter. When Macy's tried to promote her to a buyer in accessories, she moved to Agata & Valentina, a specialty foods store.

=== 1996–2004 ===
Moving back to the Adirondacks, Ray managed Mister Brown's Pub at The Sagamore, a hotel on Lake George. From there, she became a buyer at Cowan & Lobel, a gourmet market in Albany. Ray credits the concept of 30 Minute Meals to her experience working at the store, where she met people who were reluctant to cook.

In the early 2000s, Ray came to Price Chopper Supermarkets with an idea to hold some cooking classes for shoppers and perform food demos in stores. During her time working for the chain, she also wrote her first cookbook, 30 Minute Meals. With the success of her 30 Minute Meals classes, WRGB, the local CBS-TV affiliate, asked her to appear in a weekly segment on their newscasts. This, along with a public radio broadcast and the publication of her first book, led to a Today show spot and her first Food Network contract in 2001.

Rachael Ray was the host of the TV show $40 a Day for three seasons (77 episodes) from 2002 to 2005. She would travel to various destinations and attempt to eat three meals for $40 a day.

=== 2004–2017 ===
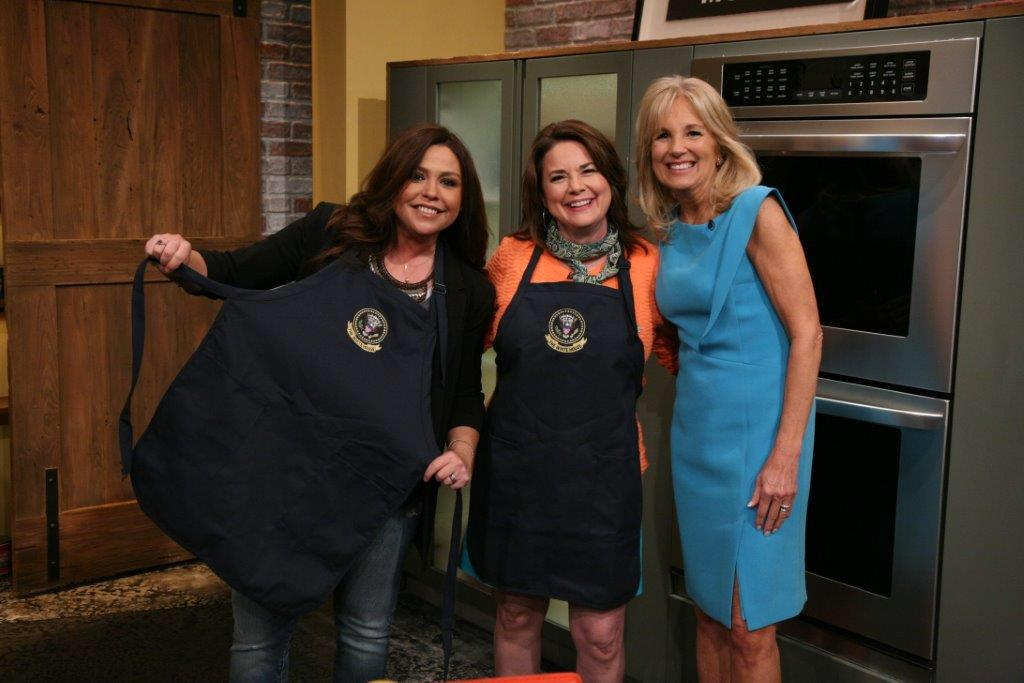
Ray, Shanna Peeples, National Teacher of the Year, and Jill Biden in 2015.

Ray favors a "quick and easy" cooking style. She teaches many simple recipes that she says can be completed in 30 minutes or less, although critics claim her concept does not include preparation time. To critics of her shortcut techniques, Ray responds, "I have no formal anything. I'm completely unqualified for any job I've ever had." She has also repeatedly said, "I'm not a chef."

On her television programs, she has used catchphrases such as "E-V-O-O" (extra-virgin olive oil), "yum-o", "G.B." (garbage bowl), "Oh my gravy!", "delish," "entréetizer" (entrée-sized appetizer), "stoup" (cross between a soup and stew), and "choup" (thicker than a soup but thinner than a chowder). In 2007, The Oxford American College Dictionary announced the addition of the term EVOO, short for extra-virgin olive oil, which Ray had helped to popularize, and credited her with coining the phrase.

One of Ray's specialties is hamburgers. She has devoted one of her published works to the topic, releasing The Book of Burger.

=== Television ===
Ray hosted 30 Minute Meals on Food Network for 11 seasons from 2001 to 2012, as well as a revival of the series starting in 2019.

In 2005, she signed a deal to host a syndicated daytime TV talk show. The show, Rachael Ray, premiered on September 18, 2006, and aired until May 24, 2023. Recurrent appearances on The Oprah Winfrey Show were used to fuel the launch. The show was recorded in New York City. In coordination with the syndication announcement, Ray said, "People know me for my love of food, but I have so much more I want to share."

On January 12, 2008, Ray's television series Rachael's Vacation premiered on the Food Network. The show was a five-part food travelogue shot in various European countries.

In 2008, Ray became a television executive producer of Viva Daisy!, a short-lived Latin cooking show on the Food Network, starring Daisy Martínez.

Rachael Ray's Week in a Day was a 2010 reality television cooking series hosted by Rachael Ray.

In January 2012, Ray and celebrity chef Guy Fieri were team captains in the Food Network reality series Rachael vs. Guy: Celebrity Cook-Off.

In 2016, Ray guest-starred in the second episode of Gilmore Girls: A Year in the Life, a miniseries revival of Gilmore Girls, as a fictionalized version of herself.

In 2019, Ray fulfilled a long-time goal of voicing a cartoon character when she voiced a character on the Nick Jr. Channel program Butterbean's Café.

In 2023, Ray announced that she would be ending her talk show after its 17th season, and that she would launch her new production company, Free Food Studios.

In 2024, Ray and her show were featured in the final episode of the show The Curse. Ray played herself on the show, with her guests being Vincent Pastore as himself, and Emma Stone and Nathan Fielder as their fictional characters Whitney and Asher Siegel.

=== Magazines ===
In 2003, Ray posed for the men's magazine FHM. Though she was not nude in any of the photos, this drew criticism (including from Ray's own mother), and Ray defended her decision in a March 2, 2009, ABC News Nightline interview with Cynthia McFadden. The interview quoted her as saying, "I'd do it again tomorrow."

The Reader's Digest Association launched Ray's magazine Every Day with Rachael Ray on October 25, 2005. The magazine featured seven issues in 2006 and increased to 10 issues in 2007. In October 2011, Meredith Corporation acquired the magazine.

=== Product endorsements ===
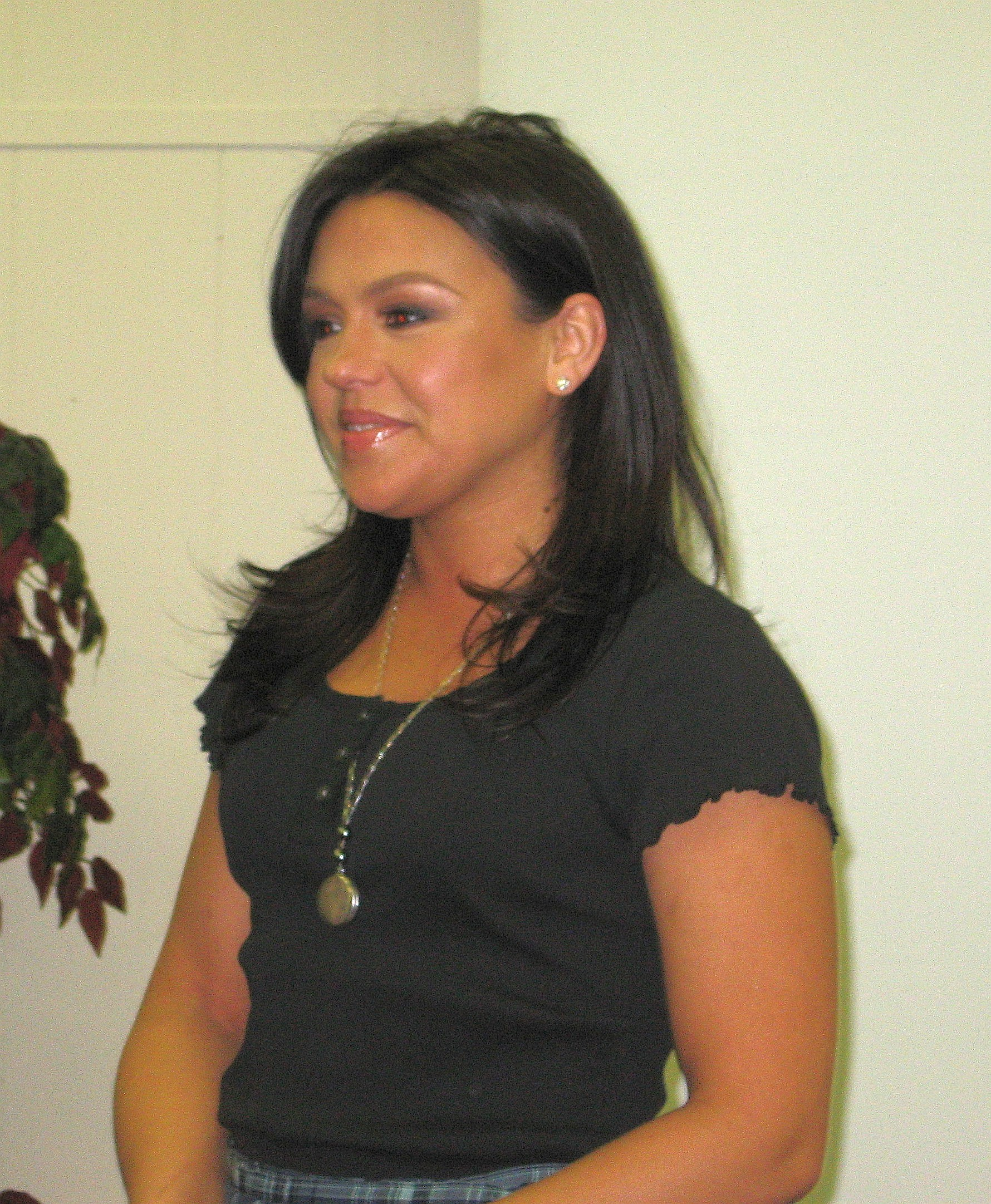
Ray in 2007

In November 2006, Ray became a spokeswoman for Nabisco crackers. She appears in commercials and on boxes for the many Nabisco products. Many boxes with Ray's picture have her recipes.

In February 2007, WestPoint Home launched sheets, blankets, and coverlets designed by Ray. Within six months, WestPoint expanded Ray's bed and bath line to include the Moppine, a two-in-one dish towel/oven mitt, as Ray is often seen with a kitchen towel over her shoulder that doubles for her as an ersatz mitt.

In March 2007, Dunkin' Donuts company announced Ray as a celebrity endorser, mainly of its coffee, since she had denied being able to make coffee herself. As part of a promotional campaign, Ray describes the company's coffee as "fantabulous."

In May 2007, Ray's recipes were made available on AT&T cellular phones via the Rachael Ray Recipes on the Run feature.

In July 2008, Rachael Ray's Nutrish pet food brand was introduced. The dog foods are created from recipes Ray developed for her pit bull, Isaboo. All proceeds from the sale of these products go to Rachael's Rescue, a charity which Ray organized specifically to provide assistance for at-risk animals.

In December 2016, PulteGroup started Rachael Ray Home Collection for their interior design division. The furniture it markets is all of Ray's own design.

== Personal life ==
On September 24, 2005, in Montalcino, Tuscany, Italy, Ray married John M. Cusimano.

Ray's main residence in Lake Luzerne, New York, was destroyed in a fire on August 9, 2020. Ray and her family were confirmed to be safe and uninjured. She also owns a Manhattan Greenwich Village apartment located near her television studio.

On May 29, 2008, Dunkin’ Donuts removed an online ad featuring Ray wearing a black-and-white patterned scarf resembling a keffiyeh, a traditional, hand-woven, checkered scarf, often made of cotton, that is worn as a headdress in the Middle East and North Africa, which some saw as supporting Islamist terrorists. Dunkin' Donuts initially ignored the complaints but later decided to remove the ad after boycott threats grew.

In June 2009, Ray stated that "hard work was too much for her to be a [mother]".

=== Charitable work ===
In 2006, Ray launched the Yum-O! nonprofit organization. Its mission is to "empower kids and their families to develop healthy relationships with food and cooking. This goal is achieved by teaching families to cook, feeding hungry kids, and funding cooking education."

Following the Russian invasion of Ukraine, Ray joined with the Ukrainian Congress Committee of America to support the charity, the Unbroken National Rehabilitation Center in Lviv, Ukraine, with projects and programs related to food and children.

== Bibliography ==
=== Cookbooks ===
- Rachael Ray's Open House Cookbook (2000)
- Comfort Foods (2001)
- Veggie Meals (2001)
- 30-Minute Meals 2 (2003)
- Get Togethers: Rachael Ray 30 Minute Meals (2003)
- Cooking Rocks!: Rachael Ray 30-Minute Meals for Kids (2004)
- $40 a Day: Best Eats in Town (2004)
- Rachael Ray's 30-Minute Meals: Cooking 'Round the Clock (2004)
- Rachael Ray's 30-Minute Meals for Kids: Cooking Rocks! (2004)
- Rachael Ray's 30-Minute Get Real Meals: Eat Healthy Without Going to Extremes (2005)
- Rachael Ray 365: No Repeats: A Year of Deliciously Different Dinners (2005)
- Rachael Ray 2, 4, 6, 8: Great Meals for Couples or Crowds (2006)
- Rachael Ray's Express Lane Meals (2006)
- Rachael Ray's Classic 30-Minute Meals: The All-Occasion Cookbook (2006)
- Rachael Ray: Just in Time (2007)
- Yum-O! The Family Cookbook (2008)
- Rachael Ray's Big Orange Book (2008)
- Rachael Ray's Book of 10: More Than 300 Recipes to Cook Every Day (2009)
- Rachael Ray's Look and Cook (2010)
- The Book of Burger (2012)
- My Year in Meals (2012)
- Week in a Day (2013)
- Guy Food: Rachael Ray's Top 30 30-Minute Meals (2014)
- Kid Food: Rachael Ray's Top 30 30-Minute Meals (2014)
- Comfort Food: Rachael Ray's Top 30 30-Minute Meals (2014)
- Everyone is Italian on Sunday (2015)
- Rachael Ray 50: Memories and Meals from a Sweet and Savory Life: A Cookbook (2019)

== Accolades ==
=== Emmy Awards and nominations ===
In 2009, Ray's sole win came during the Daytime Emmy Awards as she was ruled ineligible by multiple judges during all other nominations and did not receive any awards.

Year	Association	Nominated work	Result
2006	Daytime Emmy Award for Best Outstanding Service Show	30 Minute Meals	Nominated (ineligible)
2006	Daytime Emmy Award for Best Outstanding Service Host	30 Minute Meals	Nominated (ineligible)
2007	Daytime Emmy Award for Best Outstanding Talk Show Host	Rachael Ray	Nominated (ineligible)
2008	Daytime Emmy Award for Best Outstanding Talk Show	Rachael Ray	Nominated (ineligible)
2009	Daytime Emmy Award for Best Outstanding Talk Show	Rachael Ray	Won (only win)
2009	Daytime Emmy Award for Best Outstanding Talk Show	Rachael Ray	Nominated (ineligible)
2009	Daytime Emmy Award for Best Outstanding Service Host	30 Minute Meals	Nominated (ineligible)
2010	Daytime Emmy Award for Best Outstanding Talk Host	Rachael Ray	Nominated (ineligible)
2011	Daytime Emmy Award for Best Outstanding Talk Host	Rachael Ray	Nominated (ineligible)
2012	Daytime Emmy Award for Best Outstanding Talk Host	Rachael Ray	Nominated (ineligible)
2013	Daytime Emmy Award for Best Outstanding Talk Host	Rachael Ray	Nominated (ineligible)

=== Other honors ===
- 2004: ranked #92 on "FHM-U.S.'s 100 Sexiest Women 2004"
- 2006: ranked #71 on "FHM-U.S.'s 100 Sexiest Women 2006"
- 2006: named one of Time magazine's 100 most influential people. She was nominated by fellow Food Network star Mario Batali
- 2009: according to Forbes magazine, Ray earned about $15 million in the year ending June 2009, as well as naming her as the 79th most powerful celebrity in the world
- 2010: Ray was the inaugural honoree on the Ride of Fame
- 2011: People's Choice Award for Favorite TV Cook
- 2026: The Golden Heart Award from the President of Ukraine
