= Top Chef Masters season 5 =

Top Chef Masters
- Season 5
- No. of contestants: 13
- Winner: Douglas Keane

Release
- Original network: Bravo
- Original release: July 24 – September 25, 2013

Season chronology
- ← Previous; Season 4

The fifth season of Top Chef Masters premiered on July 24, 2013, with 13 award-winning chefs competing in weekly challenges to win the grand prize of $100,000 for their charity and the title of "Top Chef Master". Gail Simmons appeared as the new head critic for the competition. In addition, Lesley Suter, the food and dining editor for Los Angeles Magazine, joined the judging panel alongside James Oseland, Ruth Reichl, and Francis Lam.

Each Top Chef Masters contestant had their sous-chef compete in a series of separate challenges called the "Battle of the Sous Chefs". Hosted by regular Top Chef judge Hugh Acheson, the results of each webisode directly impacted the competitors of the main competition. The winner of each round rewarded their respective head chef with immunity from elimination, while the sous-chefs with the lowest performances earned them a disadvantage, such as less time to prep or shop for ingredients.

== Contestants ==
13 established chefs, along with their selected sous-chefs, competed in the fifth season of Top Chef Masters. Bryan Voltaggio originally competed in Top Chef: Las Vegas, the sixth season of the original Top Chef series. David Burke previously competed in the second season of Top Chef Masters, while Sue Zemanick appeared in the show's third season. Jennifer Jasinski's sous-chef Jorel Pierce vied for a spot on Top Chef: Seattle, the tenth season of Top Chef, but was eliminated during the qualifying rounds. Odette Fada's sous-chef Benedetto 'Bene' Bartolotta would later compete on Top Chef: New Orleans. Sue Zemanick's sous-chef would later compete in Padma's Picks to determine the 2 local New Orleans chefs that will represent the city in Top Chef: New Orleans, but he was not selected.

Contestant	Sous-chef	Charity
Franklin Becker	Vinson Petrillo	Autism Speaks
David Burke	Chris Shea	Table to Table
Lynn Crawford	Lora Kirk	Sunnybrook Foundation
Odette Fada	Benedetto Bartolotta	Doctors Without Borders
Neal Fraser	Jason Bowlin	Alex's Lemonade Stand
Jennifer Jasinski	Jorel Pierce	Work Options for Women
Douglas Keane	Drew Glassell; Paul Winberry, Jr.	Green Dog Rescue, Inc.
Jenn Louis	Cory Chunn	City of Hope
Richard Sandoval	Greg Howe	Careers Through Culinary Arts Program
Bryan Voltaggio	Graeme Ritchie	Share Our Strength
Herbert Wilson	Bobby Silva	American Heart Association
Sang Yoon	Ted Hopson	Worldwide Orphans Foundation
Sue Zemanick	Nick Lama	Gulf Restoration Network

== Contestant Progress ==
Episode	1	2	3	4	5	6	7	8	9	Finale	Cumulative Winnings
Quickfire; Winner(s)	N/A	Sue	Sang	Sang	N/A	Douglas	Douglas	Jennifer	Jennifer	N/A	Cumulative Winnings
Douglas	IN	HIGH	LOW	WIN	HIGH	HIGH	WIN	LOW	HIGH	WINNER	$120,000
Bryan	HIGH	HIGH	IN	IN	LOW	LOW	LOW	HIGH	WIN	RUNNER-UP	$20,000
Jennifer	IN	IN	WIN	LOW	LOW	OUT^{2}	WIN	WIN	LOW	RUNNER-UP	$35,000
David	LOW	IN	IN	WIN	HIGH	IN	LOW	LOW	OUT		$5,000
Sang	IN	WIN	IN	IN	WIN	HIGH	LOW	OUT			$30,000
Neal	HIGH	IN	IN	LOW	LOW	WIN	OUT				$10,000
Sue	IN	LOW	HIGH	WIN	HIGH	OUT					$10,000
Lynn	IN	IN	LOW	IN	OUT						
Franklin	IN	IN	HIGH	OUT							
Odette	WIN	LOW	OUT								$10,000
Jenn	IN	OUT									
Richard	LOW	OUT^{1}									
Herbert	OUT										

^Note 1 : Eliminated by placing last in the Quickfire Challenge.
^Note 2 : Jennifer beat Sue in the subsequent Battle of the Sous Chefs to return to the competition.

(WINNER) The chef won the season and was crowned Top Chef: Master.
(RUNNER-UP) The chef was a runner-up for the season.
(WIN) The chef won that episode's Elimination Challenge.
(HIGH) The chef was selected as one of the top entries in the Elimination Challenge, but did not win.
(IN) The chef neither won nor lost that week's Elimination Challenge. They also were not up to be eliminated.
(LOW) The chef was selected as one of the bottom entries in the Elimination Challenge, but was not eliminated.
(OUT) The chef lost that week's Elimination Challenge and was eliminated.

== Battle of the Sous Chefs ==
Episode	1	2	3	4	5	6	7	8	9	10
Graeme	IN	IN	LOW	LOW	HIGH	IN		HIGH	WIN	WIN^{4}
Jorel	HIGH	IN	IN	IN	HIGH	LOW	WIN^{3}	LOW	LOW	IN
Paul						HIGH		WIN	HIGH	LOW
Chris	LOW	IN	HIGH	IN	LOW	WIN		HIGH	LOW	OUT
Ted	IN	WIN	LOW	LOW	LOW	IN		LOW	OUT	
Jason	HIGH	IN	HIGH	HIGH	WIN	LOW		OUT		
Nick	IN	IN	IN	IN	LOW	LOW	OUT			
Drew	WIN	IN	IN	WIN	LOW	WD				
Lora	LOW	IN	WIN	LOW	HIGH	OUT				
Vinson	IN	IN	LOW	HIGH	OUT					
Benedetto	IN	IN	IN	OUT						
Cory	IN	IN	OUT							
Greg	LOW	IN	OUT							
Bobby	IN	OUT								

^Note 3 : Jorel and Jennifer beat Nick and Sue to stay in the competition. No immunity was awarded.
^Note 4 : No immunity was awarded for the finale.

(WIN) The sous-chef won the round, earning immunity for their head chef in the main competition.
(HIGH) The chef was selected as one of the top entries in the challenge, but did not win.
(IN) The sous-chef neither won nor lost the round.
(LOW) The sous-chef was selected as one of the bottom entries of the round, giving their head chef a disadvantage in the main competition.
(OUT) The head chef was ousted from the main competition in the previous episode, eliminating their respective sous-chef.
(WD) The chef withdrew from the competition.

== Episodes ==
=== Episode 1: Sous Chefs and Skydives ===
- Battle of the Sous Chefs: The sous chefs must make a dish that embodies their Top Chef Master's culinary style in 45 minutes.

- WINNER: Drew (Seared Scallop with Hon Shimeji Mushrooms & Shiitake Broth)

ADVANTAGE: Immunity (Douglas)

- Bottom: Chris, Lora, Greg

DISADVANTAGE: Top Chef Master can not use their knives; only a standard table setting may be used in its place (David, Lynn, Richard)

- Judge: Hugh

- Elimination Challenge: The chefs must prepare a family style dinner for the SkyHawks Parachute Team. Each chef must choose if they want to travel to the site via car or by skydiving. If they skydive, they will have 2 hours to cook, but if they drive they will have only 1 hour. All of the chefs except Douglas decide to jump. After this, the chefs find out that they will only get to use the same ingredients in their dishes as their sous chefs used in the sous chef battle. They also find out that Douglas has won the immunity from his sous chef's performance and that David, Lynn and Richard will not learn their disadvantage until they arrive. The winner earns $10,000 for their charity.

- WINNER: Odette (Cold Roast Lamb with Cauliflower & Anchovy Salad)
- ELIMINATED: Herbert (Grilled Mango-Cucumber Butter & Red Pepper Gazpacho, Note: missing Oysters)
- Judges: Gail, James, Leslie, The SkyHawks

- Original Airdate: July 24, 2013
- Ratings: 945,000 (0.4 18-49 rating)

=== Episode 2: Asian Night Market ===
- Battle of the Sous Chefs: The Mise en Place race. The sous chefs must prepare pomegranate, celery root, squid, and 3 cuts of lamb.

- WINNER: Ted

ADVANTAGE: Immunity (Sang)
DISADVANTAGE: All other Top Chef Masters must finish the Mise en Place before they may begin cooking.

- Elimination Quickfire: The chefs must prepare a dish in 30 minutes using the Mise en Place ingredients. The winner earns $5,000 for their charity.

- Top: Sang, Sue, Jenn

- WINNER: Sue (Seared Lamb Loin, Celery Root Purée, Fennel Pomegranate Slaw & Crispy Calamari)

- Bottom: Lynn, Odette, Richard

- ELIMINATED: Richard (Lamb Tartare, Calamari Salad, Pomegranate Jicama & Micro Green Salad)

- Judge: Gail

- Elimination Challenge: The chefs must put an Asian twist on an American classic at the 626 Asian Night Market. The chefs have 2 hours to prepare and cook on site before service begins for 200 guests. The chefs will be assisted by their sous chefs. The winner earns $10,000 for their charity.

- WINNER: Sang (Fried Shrimp Head & Poached Tail with Chili Garlic Aioli & Burmese Cabbage Slaw)
- ELIMINATED: Jenn (Banh Mi with Pork Meatballs, Chili Mayo and Cilantro-Cucumber Salad)
- Judges: Kathie Lee Gifford, Gail, James, Francis

- Original Airdate: July 31, 2013
- Ratings: 1,093,000 (0.5 18-49 rating)

=== Episode 3: Sex, Greed and Murder ===
- Battle of the Sous Chefs: The sous chefs must create a dish that highlights sausage in 45 minutes.

- WINNER: Lora

ADVANTAGE: Immunity (Lynn)

- Bottom: Graeme, Vinson, Ted

DISADVANTAGE: Loss of 30 minutes of prep time in the Elimination Challenge (Bryan, Franklin, Sang)

- Judge: Hugh

- Quickfire: The chefs must make a dish in 30 minutes using the scraps left over from the sausage challenge as their only protein. The winner earns $5,000 for their charity.

- Top: Neal, Douglas, Sang

- WINNER: Sang (Spicy Pork Larb with Cabbage & Thai Chilies)

- Bottom: Lynn, Sue
- Judges: Amelia Posada and Erika Nakamura, Owners of Lindy & Grundy butcher shop

- Elimination Challenge: The chefs will be cooking for the cast of Days of Our Lives who have just completed their 12,000th episode. The chefs must create a dish that best represents one of the three cornerstones of soap opera plotlines, Sex, Greed and Murder. With immunity, Lynn gets her choice of plot. The chefs with each plot compete against each other, with the judges picking a winner and which chef will be up for elimination from each plot. The winner earns $10,000 for their charity.

- Sex: Neal, David, Franklin, Lynn
- Greed: Douglas, Bryan, Sue
- Murder: Odette, Jennifer, Sang
- WINNER: Jennifer (Seared Duck Breast & Citrus-Chili Duck Sausage with Fregola & Celery Salad)
- ELIMINATED: Odette (Mushroom & Soft Egg Yolk Filled Raviolo)
- Judges: Gail, Ruth, Lesley, Cast (Shawn Christian, Peggy McCay, Deidre Hall, Camila Banus, Drake Hogestyn, Bryan Dattilo, Arianne Zucker, Galen Gering, James Reynolds)

- Original Airdate: August 7, 2013
- Ratings: 1,151,000 (0.4 18-49 rating)

=== Episode 4: Curtis' Surprise Party ===
- Battle of the Sous Chefs: The sous chefs must create a dish using ingredients selected by their Top Chef Master in 45 minutes. No pantry ingredients may be used.

- WINNER: Drew (Maine Lobster with Thai Vinaigrette, Mango & Avocado)

ADVANTAGE: Immunity (Douglas)

- Bottom: Lora, Graeme, Ted

DISADVANTAGE: Loss of 15 minutes shopping time in the Elimination Challenge. (Lynn, Bryan, Sang)

- Judge: Hugh

- Quickfire: The chefs must make a curry dish in 30 minutes. The chefs must develop their own curry mix and pair it with a Goose Island beer. The winner earns $5,000 for their charity.

- Top: Lynn, Sang

- WINNER: Sang (Thai Yellow Curry with Kaffir Lime & Chicken Thighs, paired with Sofie beer)

- Bottom: Douglas, Franklin
- Judge: Jason Bentley (Music Director of KCRW Radio)

- Elimination Challenge: The chefs are initially told by James that he is holding a Global Tasting for Saveur magazine and that they will provide the food. The chefs are broken into 3 teams of 3 chefs each. One team is made up of the chefs with the disadvantage and Douglas (with immunity) gets to pick the other 2 members of his team. When Curtis leaves the room to allow the chefs to menu plan with James, it is revealed that the chefs will actually be catering a surprise engagement party hosted by Curtis' fiancée, Lindsay Price. The chefs are given 30 minutes to shop and 2 hours to cook. Each chef must create their own dish and each team must create a dessert. The winning team's chefs each earn $5,000 for their charity.

- Blue Team - Lynn, Sang, Bryan
- Green Team - Franklin, Neal, Jennifer
- Red Team - David, Douglas, Sue
- WINNING TEAM: Red
- LOSING TEAM: Green

- ELIMINATED: Franklin (Salmon with Citrus, Avocado & Cucumber & Pink Sake Guava Coconut Cocktail. Ricotta Chocolate Donuts)

- Judges: James, Gail, Ruth

- Original Airdate: August 14, 2013
- Ratings: 1,018,000 (0.4 18-49 rating)

=== Episode 5: Restaurant Wars ===
- Battle of the Sous Chefs: The sous chefs must create a dish judged against a competitor using an identical basket of ingredients in 30 minutes.

- Green basket: Jason defeats Chris
- Red basket: Jorel defeats Nick
- Yellow basket: Lora defeats Drew
- Blue basket: Graeme defeats Ted
- WINNER: Jason (Sardines & Liver Wrapped in Chicken Skin with Plantain Pine Nut Butter)

ADVANTAGE: Immunity (Neal)
DISADVANTAGE: The Top Chef Masters will not have the assistance of their sous chef in the Elimination Challenge. (David, Sue, Douglas, Sang)

- Judge: Hugh

- Elimination Challenge: The chefs partner with Busy Philipps to bring to life a restaurant idea she has had for years, to take the segregated food of Los Angeles and put it together in one place. The chefs are broken into 2 teams, based on whose sous chefs won and lost the battle. The sous chefs who won their battles will assist their top chefs for 2 hours of prep time. Each team has $4,000 to shop and 45 minutes to menu plan. The winner earns $10,000 for their charity.

- "Artisan" Team: Neal, Jennifer, Bryan, Lynn
- "72 & Sunny" Team: David, Sue, Douglas, Sang
- WINNING TEAM: "72 & Sunny"

- WINNER: Sang (Strip Loin with Broccoli Two Ways, Puffed Tendon & Black Bean Ghee)

- LOSING TEAM: "Artisan"

- ELIMINATED: Lynn (Chocolate Brownie Sundae with Roasted Banana Ice Cream & Peanut Caramel Sauce)

- Judges: Gail, Ruth, Francis, Busy, Dana Cowin
- Note: After the elimination, it is revealed to Douglas that Drew has had a family emergency and must leave the competition.

- Original Airdate: August 21, 2013
- Ratings: 953,000 (0.4 18-49 rating)

=== Episode 6: Mindy Kaling and Yo Gabba Gabba! ===
- Battle of the Sous Chefs: It is revealed that Drew has been replaced by Paul due to a family emergency. The sous chefs must create a dish that highlights the onion in 45 minutes. It is also revealed that in the next elimination challenge, 2 Top Chef Masters will be eliminated.

- WINNER: Chris (Spring Onion Flan with Sweet & Sour Onions & Chicken Liver)

ADVANTAGE: Immunity (David)

- Bottom: Nick, Jason, Jorel

DISADVANTAGE: The Top Chef Masters will not have assistance of their sous chefs for the last 30 minutes of preparation during the Elimination Challenge. They must also incorporate an additional ingredient of Brussels Sprouts into their dish. (Sue, Neal, Jennifer)

- Judges: Hugh, Curtis

- Quickfire: The chefs must prepare a dish in 30 minutes inspired by the favorite romantic comedies of judge Mindy Kaling. The winner earns $5,000 for their charity.

- Top: Neal, Douglas, Sue

- WINNER: Douglas (Scrambled Eggs & Caviar with Pommes Frites)

- Bottom: Sang, Jennifer
- Judge: Mindy Kaling

- Elimination Challenge: The chefs must cook a dish for kids and adults using ingredients that kids do not like. This is based on an idea from the song "Party In My Tummy" by DJ Lance and the cast of Yo Gabba Gabba!.

- WINNER: Neal (Pasta with Brussels Sprout & Spinach Bolognese)
- ELIMINATED: Sue (Mac & Cheese with Maple Glazed Brussels Sprouts & Bacon), and Jennifer (Melon Yogurt Parfait "Sandwich" with Pickled Brussels Sprouts & Mint)
- Judges: Francis, Ruth, Gail
- Note: After the elimination, it is revealed that Jennifer and Sue will complete in Battle of the Sous Chefs with the chance for one of them to return to the competition.

- Original Airdate: August 28, 2013
- Ratings: 849,000 (0.4 18-49 rating)

=== Episode 7: Catch of the Day ===
- Battle of the Sous Chefs: Jennifer and Sue are given the opportunity to re-enter the competition with the help of their Sous Chefs. They must prepare a dish in 30 minutes showcasing a protein found on the bottom of the sea. The episode ends before the winner is revealed.

- WINNER: Jennifer & Jorel (Catfish with Coconut Cauliflower Purée & Lentil Vinaigrette)
- ELIMINATED: Sue & Nick (Cornmeal-Crusted Catfish with Corn Maque Choux & Crawfish Tails)
- Judges: Francis, Hugh

- Quickfire: The chefs must prepare their take on Nachos in 30 minutes. The winner earns $5,000 for their charity as well as immunity.

- Top: Bryan, Douglas

- WINNER: Douglas (Deconstructed nacho: Shrimp with Powdered Nacho Chips, Cheese, Beans & Salsa Consommé)

- Bottom: Sang, David
- Judge: Ali Larter

- Elimination Challenge: The chefs must cook a dish that has both hot and cold seafood preparation. The chefs get 30 minutes to shop all but the seafood protein itself. The protein is revealed the next day. The chefs have to pair up in a team of two: Jennifer and Douglas (John Dory), Bryan and Sang (sablefish) and Neal and David (sea bass). The chefs have to serve 60 guests in Duke's Restaurant, Malibu. The winners each earn $5,000 for their charity.

- WINNER: Douglas and Jennifer (John Dory Two Ways: Kimchi Cured John Dory with Crispy John Dory & Cucumbers)
- ELIMINATED: Neal (Local Sea Bass Crudo with Citrus Tomato Pepper Vinaigrette)
- Judges: Francis, James, Gail

- Original Airdate: September 4, 2013
- Ratings: 971,000 Viewers (0.4 18-49 rating)

=== Episode 8: Lucha Vavoom ===
- Battle of the Sous Chefs: The sous chefs must create a dish in 30 minutes that highlights a mistake they made working in their Top Chef Master's kitchen and how they learned from it.

- WINNER: Paul (Red Wine Risotto, Crispy Chicken Thigh & Parmesan Froth)

ADVANTAGE: Immunity (Douglas)

- Bottom: Ted, Jorel

DISADVANTAGE: The Top Chef Masters will exchange sous chefs during the final prep and service during the Elimination Challenge. (Sang, Jennifer)

- Judge: Hugh

- Quickfire: Douglas gets to pick the challenge because his sous chef won the preceding battle. The chefs must create a dish that highlights ketchup in 20 minutes. The winner earns $5,000 for their charity.

- Top: Bryan, Jennifer, Sang

- WINNER: Jennifer (Scallop with Ketchup Sauce, Fermented Black Beans, Avocados & Blood Orange)

- Bottom: David, Douglas
- Judge: Daniel Handler

- Elimination Challenge: The chefs must create a two-item Mexican menu for 300 guests at a Lucha VaVOOM event. The chefs have 3 hours to prep the day before and 1 hour at the event. At the event, Sang must work with Jennifer's sous, Jorel; while Jennifer must work with Sang's sous, Ted. The winner earns $10,000 for their charity.

- WINNER: Jennifer (Shrimp, Bass & Scallop Ceviche with Papaya, Mango, Pineapple & Plantain Crisp; Guajillo Chile Posole with Shared Cabbage, Lime, Cilantro & Queso Fresco)
- ELIMINATED: Sang (Thai-Style Shrimp Cocktail with Avocado Foam & Tortilla Strips; Pork Barbacoa with Sweet Corn Sope & Radish Cabbage Slaw)
- Judges: Lesley, Gail, Jane Goldman - founder of chow.com

- Original Airdate: September 11, 2013

=== Episode 9: Teacher Tribute ===
- Battle of the Sous Chefs: The sous chefs must create a dish in 30 minutes that has been conceived by their Top Chef Master.

- WINNER: Graeme (Steak, Potatoes, Creamed Spinach & Mushrooms)

ADVANTAGE: Immunity and automatic spot in the Finale (Bryan)

- Judge: Hugh

- Quickfire: The chef who makes the best burger in 30 minutes earns $5,000 for their charity.

- Top: David, Jennifer

- WINNER: Jennifer (Beef Burger with Caramelized Bacon, Shiitake Ponzu Slaw & Siracha Ketchup)

- Bottom: Douglas, Bryan
- Judge: Sang

- Elimination Challenge: The chefs must create a dish to honor one of 4 teachers at a dinner for the Los Angeles Unified School District. The winner earns $10,000 for their charity.

- WINNER: Bryan (Calamari Bolognese with Miso, Cavatelli, Bacon & Squid Ink)
- ELIMINATED: David (Bittersweet Chocolate Soufflé with Orange Peel & Raspberry Sauce)
- Judges: James, Gail, Alan Richman

- Original Airdate: September 18, 2013

=== Episode 10: Finale ===
- Battle of the Sous Chefs: The sous chefs must create a dessert to be served in their Top Chef Master's Finale meal based on their first day with their Top Chef Master. The winner earns $10,000 for their charity.

- WINNER: Graeme (Coconut Pudding & Sorbet with Greek Yogurt & Lavender Powder)
- Bottom: Paul (Greek Yogurt Panna Cotta, Compressed Mango & Thai Herb Ice)

DISADVANTAGE: Will not be able to assist their Top Chef Master in the first day of prep. (Douglas)

- Judge: James, Hugh

- Elimination Challenge: Create Something Old, New, Borrowed, and Sous
  - Bryan:
    - Groat Salad with Dungeness Crab, Asparagus, Hen Egg Custard, and Chicken Skin
    - Black Cod with Onion Dashi, Date, and Parsnip Puree, and Green Apple
    - Braised Beef Cheek and New York Strip with Seaweed Potatoes and Maitake Mushrooms
    - Coconut, Lavender, and Vanilla
  - Douglas:
    - Soup Billi Bi with White Wine, Saffron, Fennel Puree, and Uni
    - Soba Wrapped Ocean Trout, Ginger Dashi, and Groats
    - Duck Breast with Sake Roasted Daikon, Tamarind, Golden Pea Sprouts, and Dates
    - Black Sesame Panna Cotta, Shattered miso Custard, and Green Tea Matcha
  - Jennifer:
    - Potato-Sunchoke Galette with Salmon, Caviar, Pickled Apple, and Creme Fraiche
    - Paella Gnocchi with Chicken Meatballs, Mussels, and Shrimp
    - Chinese Duck with Shiitake Broth, Eggplant Daikon, Grilled Bok Choy, and Duck Wonton
    - Smoked Macadamia with Chocolate Bavarian Napoleon, Tapioca, and Milk Caramel
- WINNER: Douglas
- Original Airdate: September 25, 2013
