= Top Chef Masters season 3 =

Top Chef Masters
- Season 3
- No. of tasks: 19
- No. of contestants: 12
- Winner: Floyd Cardoz
- No. of episodes: 10

Release
- Original network: Bravo
- Original release: April 6 – June 15, 2011

Season chronology
- ← Previous; Season 2 Next → Season 4

The third season of the American reality competition show Top Chef Masters premiered on April 6, 2011, with 12 award-winning chefs competing against each other in weekly challenges. Celebrity chef Curtis Stone served as the new host. Food critic and author Ruth Reichl also joined as a new series judge and critic James Osland also returned. Unlike previous seasons, the chefs were not judged on a five-star rating system, but in elimination-style challenges similar to the format of the original Top Chef series.

== Critics ==
- Curtis Stone (host)
- James Oseland (critic)
- Ruth Reichl (critic)

== Master Contestants ==
12 chefs competed in this season of Top Chef Masters. In the order eliminated:

- John Rivera Sedlar — Playa (Los Angeles, CA)
- Sue Zemanick — Gautreau's (New Orleans, LA)
- John Currence — City Grocery Restaurant Group (Oxford, MS)
- Suvir Saran — Dévi (New York, NY)
- George Mendes — Aldea (New York, NY)
- Alessandro "Alex" Stratta — Alex and Stratta (Las Vegas, NV)
- Celina Tio — Julian Restaurant (Kansas City, MO)
- Hugh Acheson — Five & Ten, The National, Gosford Wine (Athens, GA)^{1} and Empire State South (Atlanta, GA)
- Naomi Pomeroy — Beast (Portland, OR)
- Traci Des Jardins — Jardinière, Public House, Manzanita and Mijita Cocina Mexicana (San Francisco, CA) -- Runner-up
- Mary Sue Milliken — Border Grill Restaurants and Truck (Los Angeles, CA) -- Runner-up
- Floyd Cardoz — North End Grill, El Verano, Tabla, Union Square Hospitality Group (New York, NY) -- Winner

== Contestant Progress ==
| Episode | 1 | 2 | 3 | 4 | 5 | 6 | 7 | 8 | 9 | Finale | Cumulative Winnings |
|---|---|---|---|---|---|---|---|---|---|---|---|
| Quickfire; Winner | Traci | John C. | Hugh | Traci | Naomi | Traci | Hugh | Hugh | Traci | None | |
| Floyd | IN (-) | HIGH | IN | WIN | HIGH | LOW | HIGH | HIGH | LOW | WINNER | $110,000 |
| Mary Sue | LOW | WIN | LOW | LOW | WIN | HIGH | HIGH | WIN | WIN | RUNNER-UP | $40,000 |
| Traci | IN (-) | IN | IN | IN | HIGH | WIN | LOW | LOW | LOW | RUNNER-UP | $30,000 |
| Naomi | HIGH | IN | WIN | HIGH | IN | HIGH | WIN | LOW | OUT | | $26,800 |
| Hugh | OUT^{1} | IN | IN | IN | IN | HIGH | LOW | OUT | | | $15,000 |
| Celina | IN (+) | IN | LOW | IN | LOW | LOW | OUT | | | | |
| Alex | WIN | LOW | IN | LOW | LOW | OUT | | | | | $10,000 |
| George | IN (-) | IN | IN | HIGH | OUT | | | | | | |
| Suvir | IN (-) | LOW | HIGH | OUT | | | | | | | $1,700 |
| John C. | IN (+) | HIGH | OUT | | | | | | | | $5,000 |
| Sue | IN (+) | OUT | | | | | | | | | |
| John S. | IN (+) | WD^{2} | | | | | | | | | |

^Note 1 : Hugh was reinstated in Episode 2, after being eliminated in the previous episode.
^Note 2 : John S. withdrew from the competition due to a personal emergency.

(WINNER) The chef won the season and was crowned Top Chef: Master.
(RUNNER-UP) The chef was a runner-up for the season.
(WIN) The chef won that episode's Elimination Challenge.
(HIGH) The chef was selected as one of the top entries in the Elimination Challenge, but did not win.
(IN) The chef neither won nor lost that week's Elimination Challenge. They also were not up to be eliminated.
[IN (+)] The chef won a pair or team challenge but was not chosen as one of the judges' favorites.
[IN (-)] The chef lost a pair or team challenge but was not selected as one of the judges' least favorites.
(LOW) The chef was selected as one of the bottom entries in the Elimination Challenge, but was not eliminated.
(WD) The chef withdrew from the competition.
(OUT) The chef lost that week's Elimination Challenge and was eliminated.

== Episodes ==
In each episode, the chefs compete to win money for their charity. The Elimination Round winners are awarded cash donations ($10,000) for their charities. Each episode consists of a Quickfire and an Elimination challenge. The Quickfire is a short, simple challenge that can vary from cooking, tasting or a food-related task (e.g., peeling a certain amount of apples to certain quality standard in a limited amount of time). The winner(s) of the Quickfire Challenge receive $5,000 for their charity. During the initial episodes of the season, the winner is usually guaranteed immunity from being sent home that week. The Elimination challenge is a more complex challenge which usually requires cooking a meal for many people with certain requirements. Unlike previous seasons of Top Chef Masters, the dishes are no longer rated out of a possible five stars. The star scoring system is replaced with the elimination format of the original Top Chef series. Each week, one or more guest judges join the show to evaluate both the Quickfire and Elimination challenges. Each week's elimination is announced in a segment called the "Critics' Table." One or more contestants are eliminated in each episode until the finale where one chef is crowned Top Chef Master. The winning chef receives $100,000 for his or her designated charity.

=== Episode 1: Restaurant Wars ===
- Quickfire Challenge: The chefs are split into pairs, and both select a box containing a secret ingredient off of a shelf. Each chef must make a dish with both of the ingredients. A top and a bottom is chosen from each pair, and one overall winner is chosen. The overall winner receives immunity from elimination.
  - Top: Floyd, George, Hugh, Mary Sue, Suvir, Traci
  - Bottom: Alex, Celina, John C., John S., Naomi, Sue
    - WINNER: Traci (Celery Salad with Peanut Butter Vinaigrette; Licorice and Orange Salad)
- Elimination Challenge: Following the standard Top Chef Restaurant Wars format, the 12 chefs split into two teams; the chefs on the top for the Quickfire Challenge forms one team (Team "Mosaic"), while the chefs on the bottom forms the other (Team "Leela"). Each team must create a restaurant name, concept, and menu. The best restaurant is selected by the diners.

- WINNING TEAM: Leela

- WINNER: Alex (Celery Root, Potato and Spinach Fricassée)
- ELIMINATED: Hugh (Scallops with Grits, Leeks, Scallions, Peppers and Pancetta)

- Guest Judge: Danyelle Freeman (Elimination Challenge)
- Original Airdate: April 6, 2011

=== Episode 2: Everything Old is New Again ===
- Quickfire Challenge: The chefs must create a meatball dish using a meat grinder. The winner receives immunity from elimination.
  - Top: John C., Sue, Suvir
  - Bottom: Floyd, George, Hugh
    - WINNER: John C. (Vietnamese Chicken Meatball)
- Elimination Challenge: The chefs are tasked with putting a modern spin on a classic '60s dish.
  - WINNER: Mary Sue (Deviled Eggs – Japanese Style Poached Egg with Umeboshi and Mustard Miso Mayonnaise)
  - ELIMINATED: Sue (Duck á l'Orange – Crispy Duck Breast, Spicy Blood Orange Gastrique and Pineapple Mango Salad)
  - WITHDREW: John S.
- Guest Judges: Kelis (Quickfire Challenge), Christina Hendricks, Geoffrey Arend (Elimination Challenge)
- Original Airdate: April 13, 2011

=== Episode 3: Diners to Donors ===
- Quickfire Challenge: The chefs must create an appetizing dish using various bugs and critters. The overall winner receives immunity from elimination.
  - Top: Hugh, Mary Sue
  - Bottom: George, Suvir
    - WINNER: Hugh (Tempura Fried Crickets, Sunchoke and Carrot Purée, Blood Orange Vinaigrette)
- Elimination Challenge: Working as one group, the chefs must cook a 10-course dinner to raise money for their charities. During preparation, three challenges are added: water to the kitchen is shut off, time is reduced by 30 minutes, and the chefs must act as their own waitstaff.
  - WINNER: Naomi (Celery Velouté with Salsa Verde and Lemon Oil)
  - ELIMINATED: John C. (Roasted Shiitake and Prosciutto Risotto with Pine Nuts and Paprika)
- Guest Judges: Ruth England, Mykel Hawke (Quickfire Challenge), Alan Sytsma (Elimination Challenge)
- Original Airdate: April 20, 2011

=== Episode 4: Biggest Loser ===
- Quickfire Challenge: The chefs are must create a great cheese dish in only 12 minutes. The overall winner receives immunity from elimination.
  - Top: Naomi, Traci
  - Bottom: Floyd, George
    - WINNER: Traci (Colombier and Prosciutto Carpaccio, Arugula and Croutons)
- Elimination Challenge: The chefs must create a breakfast, lunch, dinner, and dessert that does not exceed 1500 calories for the trainers and contestants of The Biggest Loser.
  - WINNER: Floyd (Buffalo Meatball, Farro, Spinach, Cheese, Tomato Sauce and Asparagus)
  - ELIMINATED: Suvir (Veggie Burger and Asian Slaw)
- Guest Judges: Norbert Wabnig (Quickfire Challenge), Alan Sytsma, Danyelle Freeman (Elimination Challenge)
- Original Airdate: April 27, 2011

=== Episode 5: Would You Like Fries with That? ===
- Quickfire Challenge: The chefs must create an appetizer that costs less than a dollar.
  - Top: Alex, Celina, Naomi
  - Bottom: George, Mary Sue
    - WINNER: Naomi (Asparagus & Bread Salad with Cherry Tomato & Lemon Vinaigrette)
- Elimination Challenge: In two shifts, run the fast food restaurant, Farmer Boys.
  - WINNER: Mary Sue (Skirt Steak Quesadilla Diablo, Quinoa Fritters with Sweet Pepper Garlic Mayo)
  - ELIMINATED: George (Pork and Chorizo Skewer with Clam, Cucumber and Olive Side)
- Guest Judges: Rico Gagliano, Brendan Francis Newnam (Quickfire), Alan Sytsma (Elimination)
- Original Airdate: May 4, 2011

=== Episode 6: I'm With the Band ===
- Quickfire Challenge: The chefs must create a dish in under seven minutes.
  - WINNER: Traci (Tenderloin Beef Carpaccio, Truffle, Maitake Mushroom and Balsamic)
- Elimination Challenge: The chefs must cook an entire family style meal for Maroon 5 in an RV.
  - WINNING TEAM: Black Team
    - WINNER: Traci (Japanese Style Steak, Miso Braised Daikon, Cucumber and Pea Shoot Salad)
    - ELIMINATED: Alex (Penne with Broccolini, Tomato and Garlic; Enchiladas with Onion and Seitan; Coconut-Almond Tapioca with Grapes; Breaded Turkey Cutlets)
- Guest Judges: Gail Simmons (Elimination Challenge)
- Original Airdate: May 11, 2011

=== Episode 7: Date Night ===
- Quickfire Challenge: In an updated version of the blindfolded taste challenge, the chefs compete in a four-round competition using their senses. First, the chefs must identify five ingredients through taste while wearing a blindfold, nose clip, and headphones. The next rounds involve identification through smell, touch, and hearing.
  - WINNER: Hugh
- Elimination Challenge: The chefs must create a six-course meal that corresponds to moments in a couple's relationship as the man prepares to propose.
  - WINNER: Naomi (Porcini-Braised Chicken Thigh with Sweet Potatoes Two Ways)
  - ELIMINATED: Celina (Soft Pretzel with Pale Ale Cheese Sauce, Frisée Salad with Mustard Vinaigrette)
- Guest Judges: Gail Simmons, Gael Greene (Elimination Challenge)
- Original Airdate: May 18, 2011

=== Episode 8: Blinded Me with Science ===
- Quickfire Challenge: The chefs were required to use a microwave oven to create a breakfast dish.
  - Top: Floyd, Hugh
  - Bottom: Mary Sue, Traci
    - WINNER: Hugh (Baked Egg, Chanterelles, Bacon and Tomato)
- Elimination Challenge: The chefs must prepare a dish that demonstrates a scientific principle (e.g. elasticity, acidity) and present their creations at an edible science fair. The chefs' cooking utensils were replaced with traditional lab equipment, such as Bunsen burners, test tubes, and laboratory flasks.
  - WINNER: Mary Sue (Viscosity – Dulce de Leche Churros, Chocolate Mousse and Spiced Café de Olla)
  - ELIMINATED: Hugh (Emulsion – Fried Okra Salad with Tomato, Fennel, Bacon and Green Goddess Dressing)
- Guest Judges: Frances Callier, Angela V. Shelton (Quickfire Challenge), Padma Lakshmi (Elimination Challenge)
- Original Airdate: June 1, 2011

=== Episode 9: A Soldier's Story ===
- Quickfire Challenge: The chefs were challenged to cook a dish alongside a "stranger" while separated by a screen; not knowing that the stranger was a relative. The dishes were judged on how similar the dishes looked and tasted.
  - Top: Naomi, Traci
  - Bottom: Floyd, Mary Sue
    - WINNER: Traci (Halibut with Asparagus in Brown Butter Balsamic Vinaigrette)
- Elimination Challenge: The chefs must create a homecoming meal for military servicemen returning from overseas.
  - WINNER: Mary Sue (Tomatillo Barbecue Ribs and Avocado Corn Relish with Potato and Rajas; Apple and Cream Cheese Bread Pudding with Crema)
  - ELIMINATED: Naomi (Barbecue Pork, Prawn and Cucumber Rice Salad, Iceberg Wedge with Tuna Poke; Panna Cotta with Caramelized Pineapple and Ginger Tuile)
- Guest Judges: Danyelle Freeman (Elimination Challenge)
- Original Airdate: June 8, 2011

=== Episode 10: Finale – My Life as a Chef ===
- Final Challenge: Create a three-course meal representing their life as a chef. The first course should be inspired by their first food memory. The next should be the experience that made them decide to become a chef. The third course is the favorite food memory of one of the critics, selected by random draw. For the third course, Floyd drew James, Mary Sue drew Ruth, and Traci drew Gael.
  - Floyd:
    - Wild Mushroom Upma Polenta with Kokum and Coconut Milk
    - Rice Flaked Snapper and Tomato-Fennel Broth with Carrots
    - Rendang 2 Ways: Oxtail and Short Ribs, Tapioca Pilaf with Diced Potato and Peanuts
  - Mary Sue:
    - Asian Steak Tartare
    - Shrimp and Chervil Mousse Stuffed Rigatoni, Crab and Shrimp Salpicon
    - Lemon Soufflé with Rhubarb Compote, Lemon Hazelnut Meringue and Ice Cream
  - Traci:
    - Shrimp Creole
    - Roasted Quail Salad with Sweetbreads, Mushrooms and Pancetta
    - Duo of Duck: Crisp Duck Béarnaise and Braised Duck Leg Salad
      - WINNER: Floyd
      - RUNNERS-UP: Mary Sue and Traci
- Guest Judges: Gael Greene
- Original Airdate: June 15, 2011
