= Top Chef Masters season 4 =

Top Chef Masters
- Season 4
- No. of tasks: 18
- No. of contestants: 12
- Winner: Chris Cosentino

Release
- Original network: Bravo
- Original release: July 25 – September 26, 2012

Season chronology
- ← Previous; Season 3 Next → Season 5

The fourth season of Top Chef Masters premiered on July 25, 2012 with 12 award-winning chefs competing in weekly challenges to win $100,000 for their charity and the title of Top Chef Master. Food and travel journalist, Krista Simmons, and features editor of Gilt Taste, Francis Lam, join James Oseland and Ruth Reichl as new additions to the judges' table.

== Critics ==
- Curtis Stone (host)
- James Oseland (critic)
- Ruth Reichl (critic)
- Krista Simmons (critic)
- Francis Lam (critic)

== Contestants ==
12 chefs competed in the fourth season of Top Chef Masters. In order of elimination:

- Missy Robbins – A Voce (New York City, NY) – Grow to Learn NYC
- Sue Torres – Sueños (New York City, NY) – Cystic Fibrosis Foundation
- Debbie Gold – The American Restaurant (Kansas City, MO) – Children's TLC
- Mark Gaier – Arrows Restaurant (Ogunquit, ME) – Equality Maine Foundation
- Clark Frasier – Arrows Restaurant (Ogunquit, ME) – Outright Lewiston/Auburn
- Thierry Rautureau – Rover's (Seattle, WA) – Food Lifeline
- Art Smith – Southern Art (Atlanta, GA) – Common Threads
- Takashi Yagihashi – Takashi Restaurant (Chicago, IL) – Japanese Tsunami Disaster Relief
- Patricia Yeo – Moksa (Cambridge, MA) – Heifer Project International
- Lorena Garcia – Lorena Garcia Cocina (Miami, FL) – Alliance for a Healthier Generation, Inc.
- Kerry Heffernan – Grand Banks (New York City, NY) – City Harvest -- Runner-up
- Chris Cosentino – Incanto (San Francisco, CA) – Michael J. Fox Foundation for Parkinson's Research -- Winner

== Contestant progress ==
Episode	1	2	3	4	5	6	7	8	9	Finale	Cumulative Winnings
Quickfire; Winner(s)	Chris; Patricia	N/A	Takashi	Lorena	Takashi	Takashi	Kerry	Lorena; Kerry	Chris	N/A	Cumulative Winnings
Chris	WIN	HIGH	HIGH	HIGH	LOW	WIN	HIGH	WIN	LOW	WINNER	$141,000
Kerry	HIGH	IN	LOW	LOW	HIGH	HIGH	IN	HIGH	WIN	RUNNER-UP	$17,500
Lorena	HIGH	IN	LOW	LOW	WIN	LOW	WIN	LOW	OUT		$27,500
Patricia	HIGH	WIN	IN	HIGH	LOW	LOW	LOW	OUT			$16,000
Takashi	LOW	HIGH	IN	WIN	HIGH	IN	OUT				$20,000
Art	HIGH	LOW	WIN	LOW	HIGH	OUT					$10,000
Thierry	LOW	IN	HIGH	WIN	OUT						$6,000
Clark	LOW	IN	IN	OUT							$1,000
Mark	LOW	LOW	OUT								
Debbie	LOW	OUT									
Sue	OUT										
Missy	WD										

(WINNER) The chef won the season and was crowned Top Chef: Master.
(RUNNER-UP) The chef was a runner-up for the season.
(WIN) The chef won that episode's Elimination Challenge.
(HIGH) The chef was selected as one of the top entries in the Elimination Challenge, but did not win.
(IN) The chef neither won nor lost that week's Elimination Challenge. They also were not up to be eliminated.
(LOW) The chef was selected as one of the bottom entries in the Elimination Challenge, but was not eliminated.
(WD) The chef withdrew from the competition.
(OUT) The chef lost that week's Elimination Challenge and was eliminated.

== Episodes ==
In each episode, the chefs compete to win money for their charity. The Elimination Round winners are awarded cash donations ($10,000) for their charities. Each episode consists of a Quickfire and an Elimination challenge. The Quickfire is a short, simple challenge that can vary from cooking, tasting or a food-related task (e.g., peeling a certain amount of apples to certain quality standard in a limited amount of time). The winner(s) of the Quickfire Challenge receive $5,000 for their charity. During the initial episodes of the season, the winner is usually guaranteed immunity from being sent home that week. The Elimination Challenge is a more complex challenge which usually requires cooking a meal for many people with certain requirements. Each week, one or more guest judges join the show to evaluate both the Quickfire and Elimination challenges. Each week's elimination is announced in a segment called the "Critics' Table." One or more contestants are eliminated in each episode until the finale where one chef is crowned Top Chef Master. The winning chef receives $100,000 for his or her designated charity.

=== Episode 1: The Buffet Must Go On ===
- Quickfire Challenge: The chefs split into pairs and must create a dish incorporating the two ingredients assigned to them from randomly drawn cards.
  - WINNERS: Chris and Patricia (Beefalo de Gato Pescado)
- Elimination Challenge: The chefs form two teams to create a world-class Vegas buffet. Part way through prepping, the chefs are given scratchcards, which either award them with immunity or bonus cash for their charities, force them to switch teams, or deduct 30 minutes from their total preparation time. In addition, two gold scratchcards determine the type of food the teams must make for their buffet.

- Red Team: Art, Chris, Kerry, Lorena, Missy, Patricia (Mexican Buffet)
- Blue Team: Clark, Debbie, Mark, Sue, Takashi, Thierry (Indian Buffet)

- WINNING TEAM: Red

- WINNER: Chris ("Pork and Beans" with Cured Pork and Chickpeas)
- ELIMINATED: Sue (Indian-Spiced Chicken with Lentil Rice Cakes and Tomato Ginger Jam)
- WITHDREW: Missy (She severely cut her pinky finger with a mandolin and needed to have surgery to repair the damage)

- Guest Judges: Sohik, Lisa, and Bryon (Quickfire Challenge)
- Original Airdate: July 25, 2012

=== Episode 2: You May Now Feed the Bride ===
- Elimination Challenge: The chefs are tasked with catering a wedding.
  - WINNER: Patricia (Pickled Mackerel with Young Coconut and Chilies)
  - ELIMINATED: Debbie (Grilled Green Napa Cabbage Salad)
- Original Airdate: August 1, 2012

=== Episode 3: What Would Brian Boitano Eat? ===
- Quickfire Challenge: The chefs showcase their creativity by creating a seafood dish without the use of heat.
  - Top: Chris, Mark, Takashi
  - Bottom: Kerry, Thierry
    - WINNER: Takashi (Aji Sashimi with Sea Urchin, Heirloom Tomatoes, and Daikon Apple Salad)
- Elimination Challenge: The chefs work in teams to cook teppanyaki-style dishes.

- Green Team: Kerry, Lorena, Mark
- Yellow Team: Clark, Patricia, Takashi
- White Team: Art, Chris, Thierry

- WINNING TEAM: White

- WINNER: Art (Griddled Shrimp, Cheese Grits Cakes, and Swamp Greens Salad)
- ELIMINATED: Mark (Scallops with Bok Choy, Pickled Mushrooms, and Soy-Ginger Dipping Sauce)

- Guest Judges: Brian Boitano (Quickfire Challenge); Jonathan Waxman, Mary Sue Milliken, Rick Moonen, Susan Feniger (Elimination Challenge)
- Original Airdate: August 8, 2012

=== Episode 4: Grand Canyon Cookout ===
- Quickfire Challenge: The chefs create a gourmet salad using basic salad bar ingredients.
  - Top: Kerry, Lorena, Thierry
    - WINNER: Lorena (Grilled Cauliflower with Lemon Vinaigrette)
- Elimination Challenge: The chefs prepare a meal using traditional Hualapai ingredients. Each chef must draw a knife labeled with a specific ingredient and pair up with another contestant.
  - WINNERS: Takashi and Thierry (Grilled Venison and Banana Yucca Cake with Braised Figs)
  - ELIMINATED: Clark (Spiced Beef Filet and Corn with Sage Pistou and Chili Ragout)
- Guest Judges: The B-52's (Quickfire Challenge)
- Original Airdate: August 15, 2012

=== Episode 5: Holly Madison's Pool Party ===
- Quickfire Challenge: The chefs create a meat dish with a mimicking vegetarian option.
  - Top: Art, Lorena, Takashi
  - Bottom: Patricia
    - WINNER: Takashi (Agedashi Tofu and Eggplant with a Veggie Somen Noodle Roll; Agedashi Tofu and Eggplant with Pork, Ginger, and Japanese Mushrooms)
- Elimination Challenge: The chefs prepare canapé-sized dishes for an upscale poolside brunch.
  - WINNER: Lorena (Buñuelos with Fresh Berry Compote, White Chocolate, and Condensed Vanilla Sauce)
  - ELIMINATED: Thierry (Croque Madame with Béchamel Sauce and Tomato Vodka Shooter)
- Guest Judges: Amy Ray, Emily Saliers (Quickfire Challenge); Holly Madison (Elimination Challenge)
- Original Airdate: August 22, 2012

=== Episode 6: Thai One On ===
- Quickfire Challenge: The chefs create a dish using aphrodisiac ingredients.
  - Top: Kerry, Takashi
  - Bottom: Art, Lorena
    - WINNER: Takashi (Chilled Oyster and Sea Urchin with Yuzu-Truffle Vinaigrette)
- Elimination Challenge: The chefs launch their own Thai restaurant and put their own spin on classic Thai dishes.
  - WINNER: Chris (Sirloin Steak Larb Tartare)
  - ELIMINATED: Art (Cashew-Crusted Chicken, Crispy Rice Salad with Lemongrass-Lime Vinaigrette)
- Guest Judges: Dita Von Teese (Quickfire Challenge); Saipin Chutima, Penny Chutima, Alan Sytsma (Elimination Challenge)
- Original Airdate: August 29, 2012

=== Episode 7: Culinary Knock Out ===
- Quickfire Challenge: The chefs race to complete three tasks: separate 18 eggs, grate a block of parmesan cheese, and cut a beef tenderloin into four filets, weighing between 7.5 and 8.5 ounces each without using a scale. The top two contestants then prepare a dish using the three ingredients in 15 minutes.
  - Top: Kerry, Takashi
  - Bottom: Chris, Lorena, Patricia
    - WINNER: Kerry (Parmesan Crusted Beef Fillet)
- Elimination Challenge: Each chef competes in a boxing ring against another chef, preparing a dish in 20 minutes using a secret ingredient.
  - WINNER: Lorena (Chocolate Flourless Cake, Caramelized Pineapple, and Dulce de Leche Sauce)
  - ELIMINATED: Takashi (Chicken Liver with Prosciutto and Pickled Red Cabbage)
- Guest Judges: Sugar Ray Leonard, Jane Goldman (Elimination Challenge)
- Original Airdate: September 5, 2012

=== Episode 8: Foodie Flash Mob ===
- Quickfire Challenge: Paired up in teams of two, the chefs create dishes using limited kitchen space. Each team member is either assigned to the hot line or the pantry, and is not allowed to cross the taped line that divides the kitchen in half.
  - WINNER: Kerry and Lorena (Shrimp Farfalle with Herbs and Yellow Tomato Beurre Fondue; Seared Salmon Filet Over Salsa Verde and Arugula-Celery Salad)
- Elimination Challenge: Each chef prepares a three-course packable meal for Dîner en Blanc Las Vegas.
  - Chris:
    - Swordfish Conserva with Green Beans, Tomatoes, and Olives
    - Marinated Wild Mushrooms with Toasted Pine Nuts
    - Pork and Chicken Liver Pâté with Hazelnuts and Truffles
  - Kerry:
    - Chilled Cauliflower Soup with Saffron Coulis
    - Haricot Vert, Orzo, and Mozzarella with Pesto
    - Grilled Chicken and Kielbasa with Peppers and Paprika Coulis
  - Lorena:
    - Huancaina-Style Potato Salad with Aji Amarillo and Cilantro
    - Jerk Chicken Salad with Mango and Caramelized Pine Nuts
    - Jalapeño Chocolate Mousse with Berries and Whipped Cream
  - Patricia:
    - Daikon, Edamame, and Radish Salad with Whitebait
    - Uyghur Spiced Bison with Chili Jam
    - Sumac Dusted Flatbread with Curried Cauliflower and Red Chief Lentils
  - WINNER: Chris
  - ELIMINATED: Patricia
- Guest Judges: Johnny Avello (Quickfire Challenge); Aymeric Pasquier, Sandy Safi (Elimination Challenge)
- Original Airdate: September 12, 2012

=== Episode 9: Old School, New School ===
- Quickfire Challenge: The chefs are challenged to cook identical dishes alongside a mystery teammate while separated by a screen, unaware that their partners were the critics. The dishes are judged on how similar the dishes look and taste.
  - WINNER: Chris (Prawns with Sautéed Celery, Thyme, Pine Nuts, and Chili Threads)
- Elimination Challenge: Each chef is tasked with guiding two culinary students from Las Vegas' Southwest Career and Technical Academy. The chefs are only allowed to instruct, while the students cook and serve the dishes to the critics.
  - WINNER: Kerry (Florentine-Inspired Chicken with Orzo and Asparagus Ragout)
  - ELIMINATED: Lorena (Three Meat Lasagna and Arugula Salad with Raspberry Vinaigrette)
- Guest Judges: Felicia Nemcek, Linda Burns, Allen Asch (Elimination Challenge)
- Original Airdate: September 19, 2012

=== Episode 10: Finale ===
- Elimination Challenge: The finalists prepare four courses based on four letters: a love letter, an apology letter, a thank you letter, and a letter to themselves.
  - Chris:
    - Beef Heart Tartare, Foie Gras, and Puffed Beef Tendon
    - Scallop, Pancetta Piana, and Sea Urchin
    - Trippa Napolitana
    - Blood Sausage, Poached Oysters, and Egg
  - Kerry:
    - Scallop and Spot Prawn "Korean Jjigae"
    - Flan of Sugar Snap Peas with Prosciutto, Morels, and Chervil
    - Branzino with Clam Ragout and Mustard Greens
    - Dry Aged "Côte de Boeuf," Short Ribs with Swiss Chard and Fennel Gratin
  - WINNER: Chris
  - RUNNER-UP: Kerry
- Guest Judges: Alan Sytsma, John Curtas, Karen Brooks, Alan Richman, Jane Goldman, Lesley Bargar Suter
- Original Airdate: September 26, 2012
