= Suvir Saran =

Indian-American chef (born 1972)

- Born: 29 November 1972 (age 53); New Delhi, India
- Culinary career
- Cooking style: Indian / American
- Television show: Top Chef Season 3
- Website: http://www.suvir.com

Suvir Saran (born 29 November 1972 in New Delhi, India) is a chef, cookbook author, educator as well as a farmer who specializes in bringing Indian cooking to the American kitchen.

He studied visual arts at Sir J. J. School of Art in Bombay before leaving India in 1993 to study in New York City at the School of Visual Arts. During this time he enjoyed cooking and entertaining friends when he was not working or going to school. He quickly took what was a hobby and turned it into a catering business Rasoi, The Indian Kitchen. In 1997 joined the staff at Department of Food and Nutrition at New York University's Professional Development and Continuing Education Program. Later becoming an executive chef at Dévi on East 18th Street in New York City, appearing on Bravo's Top Chef: Masters (season 3) and writing several best selling cookbooks. On 10 November 2015, Suvir Saran hosted an evening of Indian cuisine as part of the University of Notre Dame's celebrity chef series.

== Top Chef Masters ==
Suvir appeared as a contestant on the third season of Bravo's Top Chef Masters making it to the fourth round. Eliminated during "The Biggest Loser" episode, he chose to create a vegetarian burger rather than the requested bacon cheese burger and did a monologue about the health impacts of red meat. During the exit interview on the show he stated he had no regrets about his choices and what he had said.

== Cookbooks ==
Masala Farm (Chronicle Books, 2011)

American Masala (Clarkson Potter, 2007)

Indian Home Cooking (Clarkson Potter, 2004)

== Dévi ==
Dévi, located in New York City, specialized in the flavors of Indian home cooking. The 75-seat restaurant got its name from the mother goddess. Recipient of a two star rating from New York Times, a three star rating from New York Magazine and the first Indian restaurant in the US to have earned a Michelin Star. Suvir left Devi in March 2012, and it closed 1 April 2012.

== American Masala Farm ==
Saran operated a farm, which he named American Masala Farm, in Hebron, New York for a period of time, before selling the property in order to move on to new projects.

== Resources ==
- Suvir Saran - Official Site
- Suvir Saran - Official Blog
