= Dean Neff =

American chef and restaurateur

Dean Neff is an American chef and restaurateur based in Wilmington, North Carolina. He was a finalist for the James Beard Foundation Award for Outstanding Chef in 2024 and was a semifinalist in 2026. He was a semifinalist for Best Chef: Southeast in 2019 and 2023. His work and restaurants have been featured in The Wall Street Journal, Garden & Gun, and Forbes. He is the chef-owner of Seabird and Zora’s Market & Kitchen.

== Early life and education ==
Neff was born in Columbus, Ohio and moved at the age of five to Savannah, Georgia. He was the youngest of four siblings. During his childhood, he developed an interest in cooking, often experimenting in the kitchen while his parents worked.

At the age of 18, Neff moved to Atlanta where he studied at the School of Culinary Arts. He later earned a business degree from the University of Georgia.

== Career ==
After completing his culinary training, he relocated to Athens,Georgia, where he spent approximately a decade working at Hugh Acheson’s restaurant Five & Ten. During his tenure there, he became executive chef and developed an emphasis on seasonal cooking and ingredient-driven cuisine.

In 2013, Neff moved to Asheville, where he joined John Fleer as chef de cuisine at Rhubarb, a restaurant focused on Appalachian cuisine and regional sourcing. Following a knee injury, he stepped away from full-time restaurant work and became a culinary instructor at Asheville-Buncombe Technical Community College, where he taught cooking courses and coached the institution’s competitive culinary team.

In 2015, Neff relocated to Wilmington and co-founded PinPoint Restaurant with restaurateur Jeff Duckworth. Serving as co-owner, managing partner, and executive chef, he led the restaurant to regional recognition, including being named by Southern Living among notable new restaurants in the South. He was a semifinalist for the James Beard Foundation Best Chef: Southeast award in 2019. He departed PinPoint later that year to pursue independent projects.

In 2021, Neff and his wife Lydia Clopton opened Seabird in downtown Wilmington. The restaurant received coverage in national publications including The Wall Street Journal, Garden & Gun and The Local Palate, and was named both “Essential” and “Beach Restaurant of the Year” by Eater.

He participated in the James Beard Foundation Chef Bootcamp for Policy and Change and serves on the regional council of the Food Bank of Central and Eastern North Carolina. Neff is an advocate of North Carolina’s sustainable fishing, aquaculture, and farming practices and works with cosatal foragers to access local ingredients at sustainable levels.

He is also affiliated with the North Carolina Oyster Trail and serves on the North Carolina Fish Consumption Advisory at Duke University.

In 2024, Neff acquired Zora's Market & Kitchen, where he maintained its seafood market operations including the launch of the “Zora's Fish Bank.

In 2025, he hosted the inaugural North Carolina Oyster & Seafood Festival in collaboration with The Oyster Master Guild. The two-day event marked the start of wild oyster season and focused on North Carolina's coastal food traditions, local fishermen and women, and sustainable seafood practices.

== Awards ==
Neff has been recognized multiple times by the James Beard Foundation.

He was a James Beard Foundation Award semifinalist for Best Chef: Southeast in 2019 and 2023. In 2024, he was named a finalist for the Outstanding Chef Award. He was a semifinalist for Outstanding Chef in the 2026 award cycle.

In 2026, he was awarded the Ken Conrad Award by the North Carolina Restaurant and Lodging Association.

== Personal life ==
Neff is married to pastry chef Lydia Clopton, with whom he has collaborated professionally on multiple restaurant projects. The couple met while working together at Five & Ten and later co-founded PinPoint Restaurant. Clopton also operated a bakery, Love, Lydia, in Wilmington. They have two children.
