= Jennifer Jasinski =

American chef and restaurateur

- Born: Santa Barbara, California
- Education: The Culinary Institute of America
- Culinary career
- Current restaurants: Rioja; Bistro Vendome; Euclid Hall Bar and Kitchen; Stoic & Genuine; Ultreia
- Previous restaurant: Panzano
- Television show: Top Chef Masters
- Award won: James Beard Foundation Award for Best Southwest Chef 2013
- Website: www.jenniferjasinski.com

Jennifer Jasinski is an American chef and restaurateur who has owned and operated several restaurants in Denver, Colorado. She won the James Beard Foundation Award for Best Southwest Chef in 2013.

== Early life and education ==
Jennifer Jasinski was born and raised in Santa Barbara, California. She and her two siblings took turns cooking dinner while their mother was a single parent. Jasinski played clarinet, oboe, and flute, but a high school class in culinary arts attracted her to working as a chef.

Jasinski attended culinary classes at Santa Barbara City College and then at The Culinary Institute of America at Hyde Park, graduating in 1989.

== Career ==
She worked first in kitchens in New York City, including at the Rainbow Room, before moving to Los Angeles, California, where she worked under Wolfgang Puck. In 2000, she moved to Denver, Colorado, where she became head chef at the Panzano restaurant within Hotel Monaco. She stayed for five years, until together with Beth Gruitch, she opened her own restaurant, Rioja, within the same city.

She opened several other restaurants in Denver including Euclid Hall, Bistro Vendome and Stoic & Genuine. A further location opened in late 2017 at Denver Union Station, entitled Ultreia, which was based on the Iberian pintxos style of dining. The new restaurant was located near to the existing Stoic & Genuine, which serves a seafood based menu.

In 2010 Jasinski published The Perfect Bite. In 2013 she participated in the fifth season of Top Chef Masters, reaching the finals.

In 2024 Jasinski and Gruitch closed Stoic & Genuine and stepped back from day-to-day operations of Ultreia and Bistro Vendôme.

== Recognition ==
Jasinski won the James Beard Foundation Award for Best Southwest Chef in 2013. In 2021 she was inducted into Nation's Restaurant News' MenuMasters Hall of Fame.

== Personal life ==
Jasinski married Max MacKissock.
