= Silvena Rowe =

Bulgarian-British chef

- Born: Silvena Lauta; 1964 (age 61–62); Plovdiv, Bulgaria
- Spouse: Malcolm Rowe

Silvena Rowe (née Lauta, born in Plovdiv, Bulgaria) is a Bulgarian chef, food writer, television personality and restaurateur.

== Biography ==
Rowe was born in Plovdiv to a Bulgarian mother and a Turkish father. Rowe's father, who was a newspaper editor of the largest [citation or source needed?] Bulgarian newspaper, Bulgarianised his name due to Bulgaria's communist government. He instilled in Rowe a love of cooking and passed down the traditions of the Ottoman cuisine. At the age of 19, she moved to London. Silvena cooked in the kitchen of the Notting Hill bookshop Books for Cooks, which led her to cook for Princess Michael of Kent, Ruby Wax and Tina Turner. She also met Malcolm Gluck and the two began to write a regular food column for The Guardian newspaper. In 2007, she was the food consultant on David Cronenberg’s 2007 film Eastern Promises. She has become a regular guest on the BBC's Saturday Kitchen and ITV's This Morning. In 2007, her book Feasts won the Glenfiddich Food and Drink Award. After her father's death she wanted to rediscover her heritage so she travelled through Turkey, Syria, Lebanon and Jordan tracing her Ottoman roots; this resulted in her cookbook Purple Citrus and Sweet Perfume.

On 7 June 2011, her restaurant Quince opened at The May Fair Hotel in Mayfair, London. Her restaurant is influenced by her Turkish heritage- homage to her grandfather Mehmed, who used to cook the dishes for her father. Currently Silvena shares her time between Dubai, Sofia, New York and London.

Silvena Rowe is also a Charlton Athletic Supporter.

== Awards ==
- 2007: Glenfiddich Food and Drink Award-London
- 2011: Gourmand Award - Paris
- 2017: Commitment to Healthy Eating, Time Out Dubai Restaurant Awards- Dubai

== Television appearances ==
- Food Network"Chopped" guest judge S18 Episode 225 05/13/2014
- BBC One's Saturday Kitchen, a regular guest
- BBC Two's Country Show Cook Off S01 E16-20 (2013)
- ITV This Morning
- Let's Dance for Comic Relief
- Screen expert/judge on BBC Young Chef of the Year (2009)
- Come Dine with Me
- Great Food Live
- Soapstar Superchef
- Time Machine Chefs
- A bit of salt - bTV (2013)
- Masterchef Bulgaria on bTV - Judge in Season 5 (2019), Season 6 (2020) and Season 7 (2021)

== Books ==
- Supergrub: Dinner-party Bliss on a Budget, HarperCollins, (ISBN 9780007176120, 2004)
- Feasts: Food for Sharing from Central and Eastern Europe, Mitchell Beazley, (ISBN 9781845331566, 2006)
- The Eastern and Central European Kitchen: Contemporary & Classic Recipes, Interlink, (ISBN 1566566789, 2008)
- Purple Citrus and Sweet Perfume: Cuisine of the Eastern Mediterranean, Hutchinson, (ISBN 9780091930967, 2010)
- Orient Express, Hutchinson, (ISBN 9780091930950, 2011)
- My Kitchen (Моята кухня), A&T Publishing, (ISBN 9786197430516, 2021)
