= Gray Kunz =

Singaporean-born Swiss restaurateur (1955–2020)

- Born: February 24, 1955; Singapore
- Died: March 5, 2020 (aged 65); Poughkeepsie, New York, U.S.
- Culinary career
- Cooking style: French, Fusion
- Website: graykunz.com//

Gray Kunz (February 24, 1955 – March 5, 2020) was a Singaporean-born Swiss restaurateur, chef, and cookbook writer based in New York. Kunz spent his early childhood in Singapore, which influenced his fusion style of cooking later in his life. He had a career that spanned three continents and was one of Manhattan’s most acclaimed chefs of the 1990s, when he worked for nine years at Lespinasse.

== Biography ==
Born in Singapore on February 24, 1955, Kunz was raised there as well as in Switzerland. He received his culinary education in Bern, Switzerland. He worked at the Beau Rivage Palace in Lausanne and Baur au Lac in Zürich. Then, Kunz apprenticed under Swiss chef Frédy Girardet for five years in Crissier. After that, he moved to the Regent Hotel in Hong Kong, where he learned French and Chinese cooking methods. In 1988, he moved to Adrienne at the Peninsula Hotel in New York. In 1991, he became the Executive Chef of Lespinasse, becoming the highest-paid chef in the city at the St. Regis Hotel, where he was allowed freedom of creativity and budget to attract members of the "Concorde crowd". While there, he created a special spoon used by the chefs in his kitchen, which was later cited as the favorite kitchen tool for many chefs. He eventually left the restaurant during period of success to venture out and founded his own restaurants, including Salt and Char in Saratoga Springs, New York, Cafe Gray in the Time Warner Center in Manhattan, and Grayz at 13 West 54th Street, also in Manhattan. Kunz mentored many future celebrity chefs, such as Andrew Carmellini, Floyd Cardoz, Rocco DiSpirito, and Corey Lee. He died of a stroke in March 2020 in Poughkeepsie, New York.

== Cuisine ==
Kunz's dishes reflected his travel and educational experience. They married classic French technique with Pan-Asian flavors and ingredients that he became familiar with in Singapore as a child and later in Hong Kong, where he worked as a chef for five years. He layered techniques from Europe, India, China, and Southeast Asia in his work. In 1994, Ruth Reichl, a food writer, chef, editor, and producer, awarded Kunz a four-star review in the New York Times, the first she had ever given. Aside from the Four Stars from the New York Times, his work earned him multiple James Beard nominations for "Outstanding Chef". Kunz received the Mobil 5 Diamond Award for 1996, 1997, and 1998, was inducted into the Restaurant Hall of Fame in 1998 and the Culinary Institute of America recognized him as a Master of Aesthetics in 2002. Chris Crowley writing for Grub Street in 2016 called Kunz "perhaps the closest chef New York’s modern restaurant scene has to someone like Paul Bocuse.

== Restaurants ==
- Café Gray in the Time Warner Center, New York, NY (opened in 2004, closed in 2008)
- Grayz in Midtown NYC, New York, NY (closed in 2008)
- Café Gray Deluxe Hong Kong at The Upper House hotel (opened in 2009, closed permanently on 31 December 2020)
- Salt and Char in Saratoga Springs, NY (opened in July 2016, separated by end of 2016)
- Café Gray Deluxe Shanghai at The Middle House hotel (opened in 2018)

== The Elements of Taste ==
Peter Kaminsky teamed up with Gray and the two published "The Elements of Taste" in 2001.
