= Chris Cosentino =

American celebrity chef and reality television personality

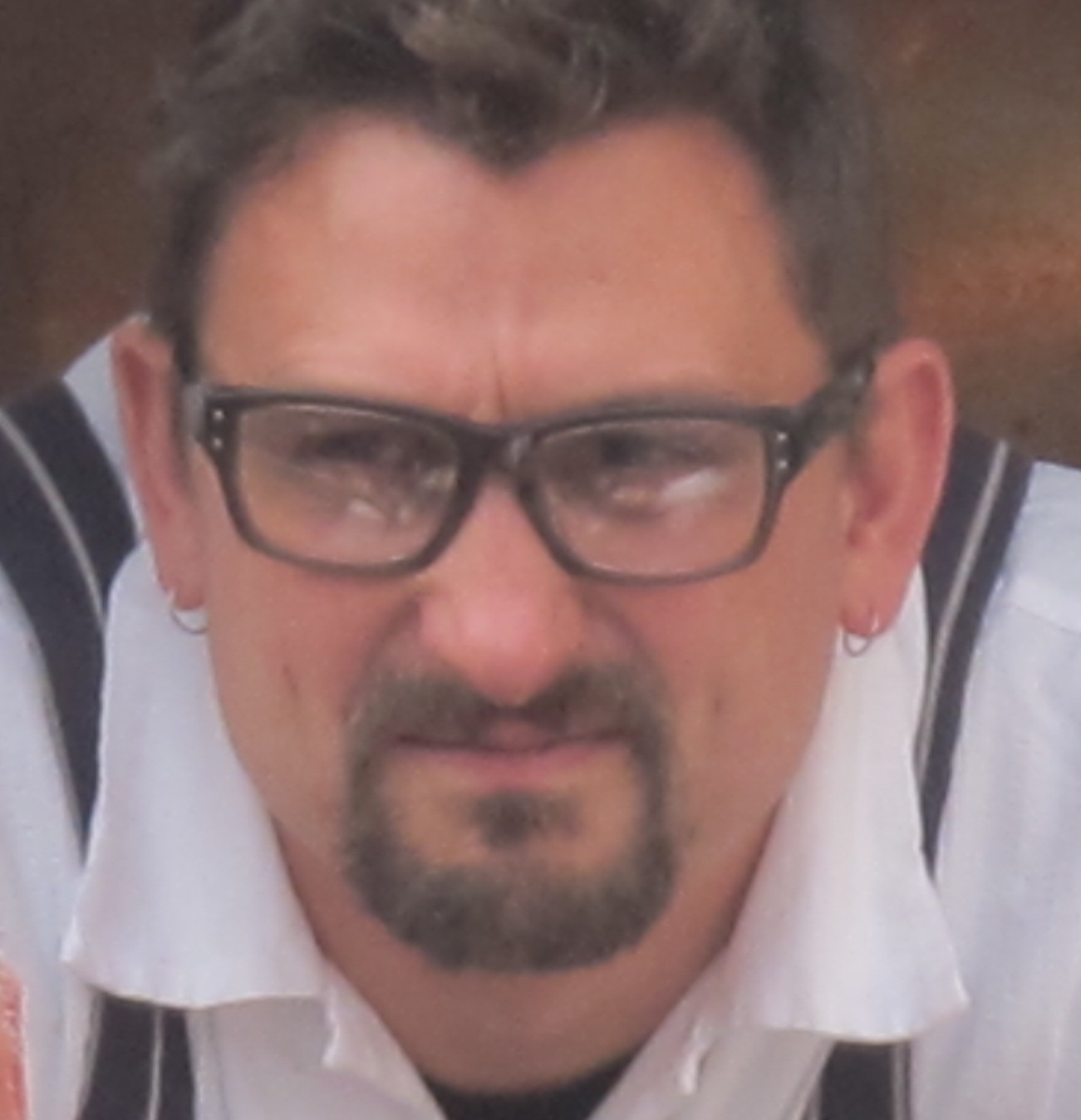
- Chris Cosentino in 2010
- Born: Rhode Island
- Culinary career
- Cooking style: Italian cuisine
- Current restaurant: Cockscomb
- Website: https://www.chefchriscosentino.com/

Chris Cosentino is an American celebrity chef and reality television personality known as the winner of Top Chef Masters, a competitor on The Next Iron Chef and for his appearances on Iron Chef America. He is known for his haute cuisine offal dishes, and was chef-partner at Incanto in San Francisco. Forbes Traveler called Incanto "perhaps America's most adventurous nose-to-tail restaurant … On offer are lamb's necks, pig trotters and a five-course nose-to-tail tasting menu perhaps including venison kidneys and chocolate-blood panna cotta." Incanto closed on March 24, 2014. In December 2014, he opened Cockscomb, a restaurant centered around his updated interpretations of classic San Francisco dishes.

In 2017 he published the cookbook Offal Good: Cooking from the Heart, with Guts, and he maintains an offal-themed website, "Offal Good".

== Early life ==
Chris Cosentino was raised in Rhode Island and is a 1994 graduate of Johnson & Wales University. In 2018, Cosentino gave a cooking demonstration to students at his alma mater, during which he offered students career advice to achieve their goals. While there, he also had a chance to thank one of his mentors, a chef, Jacques Pepin. He cited Pepin's cookbooks, La Technique and La Methode, with their detail and step-by-step illustrations as helping him deal with dyslexia and attention deficit disorder. Explaining what these books and Pepin's influence meant to him, Cosentino said that having dyslexia and attention deficit disorder prevented him from being able to read traditional textbooks and cookbooks.

Raised in an Italian American community, he has stated that he hated offal as a child, especially the tripe his Italian grandmother prepared. Since becoming a chef himself, however, he has embraced a "whole-animal ethic": "What I try to do is make people understand a whole-animal ethic. When people realize that this is a whole animal, that there is more than just the skeletal meats, sometimes that makes people step back and they might not order any meat. They might have a vegetable entrée. Putting a face on what you're eating sometimes opens your eyes a lot."

== Career ==
Cosentino worked at Mark Miller's Red Sage and later at Kinkead's, in Washington, D.C. He then moved to San Francisco's Rubicon, which was owned by Francis Ford Coppola, Robin Williams and Robert De Niro. He went on to work at several prestigious restaurants, such as the Coach House on Martha's Vineyard and Bay Area restaurants Chez Panisse and Belon. He was then hired as a consultant to the Aqua restaurant group. While working with them, he opened several restaurants, including the highly acclaimed Nobhill at the MGM Grand in Las Vegas.

After 2002, Cosentino worked at Incanto in the San Francisco neighborhood Noe Valley, serving as the executive chef. Local restaurant critics noted an upturn in food quality at Incanto after he took over. Working with co-owner Mark Pastore, Cosentino created a rustic Italian menu that included cuts of meat from whole animals and fish, including what would usually be discarded or used as an ingredient in animal feed. In 2007, Incanto held their fourth annual "Head-to-Tail Dinner."

In 2007, Cosentino opened a salumeria named Boccalone: Tasty Salted Pig Parts in San Francisco's Ferry Building. This new company was following in his family's traditions, as his mother's family ran Easton's Sausage Company in Newport, Rhode Island from 1860 to 1942. He uses many of the original recipes from Easton's for Boccalone products. Under Cosentino's direction, Incanto launched a charcuterie selection, with all products cured in-house and ranging from mortadella to fennel salume, sweetbread terrines, and salt-cured pork liver. This product line is based on the community-supported agriculture (CSA) concept in which providing locally grown produce is the focus. Cosentino credits the late chef Jean-Louis Palladin with teaching him never to cook for reviews but only for the diners and himself. Palladin was an avid hunter and taught Chris to be realistic and respectful about the fate of an animal going from the farmyard or the forest to the dinner plate.

In October 2007 Cosentino was a contestant on The Next Iron Chef, competing with his former mentor at Rubicon, Traci Des Jardins, still a close friend. On the third episode, when Michael Symon gave him squab as a secret ingredient, his first action was to check the cavities for offal. It was implied that Symon had removed the innards; when Cosentino discovered this, Symon quipped, "No guts, no glory." In episode 7, 'Lead and Inspire', he was the last chef eliminated before the final battle. In November 2007, he was featured at the end of a Modern Marvels episode about pigs, during which he showed his expertise in cooking pork brain.

In August 2009, he and fellow The Next Iron Chef contestant Aarón Sánchez began hosting Chefs vs. City on the Food Network. Each week they traveled to a different city, taking on two local chefs in a variety of food-related challenges. Repeated consumption of chili peppers resulted in Cosentino's suffering third-degree alkaline burns in his digestive system and losing intestinal motility. This injury took five years to heal.

Cosentino is regularly featured on episodes of the Food Network series The Best Thing I Ever Ate.

He considers single-varietal extra-virgin olive oils with their distinctive flavors as his culinary secret weapon. Cosentino's involvement with local farmers' markets has enabled him to develop close relationships with local food producers. These relationships are very important to him and allow him to be involved in the production of meat and other ingredients he uses in his many specialties. He has been especially dedicated to the San Francisco Ferry Plaza Farmers' Market.

In his spare time Cosentino cycles on rugged Northern California mountain-biking trails on a one-speed bicycle, participates in endurance rides, and spends time with his wife "Treat Maven" and young son.

In 2011 it was announced that Cosentino is teaming up with the publishers of Wolverine to write a comic book. In addition to helping out with the story, he'll also be featured as a character. He has authored a cookbook, Beginnings: My Way to Start a Meal, published in May 2012. Michael Harlan Turkell is the photographer for the book, and Traci Des Jardin wrote the foreword. The book contains recipes for dishes for first courses (most vegetable-based, not meat-based, despite Cosentino's specialty), but also includes philosophy and reproduced handwritten notes and sketches. It is laid out by seasons.

In March 2012, Cosentino partnered with Adam Fleischman and opened PIGG, "a tribute to all things pork around the world", at UMAMIcatessen in Los Angeles. UMAMIcatessen is a three-part cafeteria-style dining establishment on the ground floor of the Orpheum Lofts at 9th and Broadway.

On September 26, 2012, Cosentino won season four of Top Chef Masters on Bravo, raising $141,000 for the Michael J. Fox Foundation for Parkinson's Research.

Cosentino and his partner announced on March 5, 2014, that they would close Incanto to open Porcellino at the same location. It was to be a more casual neighborhood dining option/retail space. With the opening of Cockscomb, however, it was closed. Cockscomb focuses on classic San Francisco cuisine more than to Italy. Oysters and shellfish are a major aspect of what the restaurant offers.

In 2016, Cosentino announced that he would open Jackrabbit, his first restaurant outside of California, in Portland, Oregon.

On October 21, 2020, Cosentino announced "We are closing Cockscomb permanently."

== Television appearances ==
- 2005, Check Please! Bay Area
- 2005, Martha Stewart
- 2007, Iron Chef America
- 2007, The Next Iron Chef
- 2007, Modern Marvels - Episode: The Pig
- 2008, Iron Chef America
- 2008, At The Table With...
- 2009, Chefs vs. City Food Network
- 2009, No Reservations Travel Channel, August 10
- 2009, The Best Thing I Ever Ate Food Network
- 2011, Bizarre Foods with Andrew Zimmern Travel Channel, March 1
- 2012, The Layover, San Francisco, Travel Channel, January 9
- 2012, Top Chef Canada-Episode 4, Food Network Canada, April 1
- 2012, Top Chef Masters Season 4, Bravo, July 25
- 2012, Time Machine Chefs, ABC, August 16

== See also ==
- Animal husbandry
- Italian-American cuisine
- Local food
- Locavore
- Sustainable agriculture
- Sustainable food system
