= Andrew Carmellini =

American chef, writer and restaurateur

- Born: United States
- Education: The Culinary Institute of America
- Years active: 1996–present
- Spouse: Gwen Hyman
- Culinary career
- Cooking style: Italian cuisine
- Website: andrewcarmellini.com

Andrew Carmellini is an American chef and restaurateur. Carmellini is responsible for the food and drink at the 15 restaurants, bars and food stands he owns with his partners at NoHo Hospitality. He has received a place on Food & Wine’s Best New Chefs list, James Beard Rising Star Chef and Best Chef New York awards, and a Michelin star. He is the author of two cookbooks.

== Career ==
Carmellini began his cooking career at age 14 in his hometown in Seven Hills, Ohio. After a stint at San Domenico in New York City, Carmellini honed worked at restaurants in Europe, including Valentino Marcatili's two-star Michelin restaurant San Domenico in Emilia-Romagna, Gualtiero Marchesi di San Pietro all'Orto in Milan and Arpège in Paris. In New York, Carmellini then spent four years on Gray Kunz's New York Times four-star team at Lespinasse and served as sous chef at Le Cirque.

Carmellini worked as chef de cuisine at Café Boulud, where he earned three stars from The New York Times, won The James Beard Foundation's Best New Chef and Best Chef: New York awards and was named to Food & Wine’s Best New Chefs roster. As chef at A Voce, he earned a three-star New York Times review and a Michelin star.

In 2009, Carmellini opened Locanda Verde, a Tribeca Italian taverna, in Robert de Niro’s Greenwich Hotel with partners Luke Ostrom and Josh Pickard.

With his wife, Gwen Hyman, Carmellini is the author of two books of recipes and stories: Urban Italian, and American Flavor.
