= Janice Kaplan =

American novelist

- Education: Yale University
- Occupations: Novelist; Journalist; Publishing Executive

Janice Kaplan is an American novelist, magazine editor, and television producer. Kaplan served as the Editor-in-Chief of Parade magazine (2007–2010), the Sunday newspaper supplement with a circulation of 32 million. Kaplan is the author of fifteen books and hosts a podcast about gratitude.

== Early career ==
Kaplan grew up in Newton, Massachusetts and attended Yale University. She began her career as a sports reporter at CBS Radio and wrote a monthly sports column for Seventeen magazine for five years. While in college, she was selected as a Guest Editor at Mademoiselle magazine and named as one of the Top Ten College Women by Glamour magazine. She graduated Yale magna cum laude and won the Murray Fellowship to research her first book, Women and Sports, which was published by Viking Press.

== Books and television ==
Kaplan is the author and co-author of ten novels and five non-fiction books. Her inspirational memoir The Gratitude Diaries: How A Year Looking On the Bright Side Transformed My Life was published by Dutton in August 2015 and became a New York Times bestseller. She continued writing about happiness with What Your Body Knows About Happiness (2025) which explored mind-body connections.Mine Are Spectacular (2005) was a national bestseller that People magazine called “a funny, buoyant novel [with] whip-smart dialogue.” The Botox Diaries ( 2004) received attention as a breakthrough for “chick lit.” Kaplan subsequently wrote two mysteries set in Los Angeles featuring a heroine named Lacy Fields. In 2013, she-coauthored the book "I'll See You Again" (Gallery Books/Simon & Schuster) which was on the New York Times bestseller list for several weeks. Her non-fiction book "The Genius of Women: From Overlooked to Changing the World" was published by Dutton in February 2020 to strong reviews.

Kaplan published several novels early in her career, often using her experiences as a television producer as background. A Morning Affair (NAL, 1989) was set in a morning television show, and Kaplan had been a writer and producer at Good Morning America on ABC network from 1982 to 1986. She later worked as a producer at the syndicated show A Current Affair and was Executive Producer of the TV Guide Television Group, where she created 30 network television programs, including The TV Guide Awards Show on Fox and the series Celebrity Dish on Food Network.

== Bibliography ==
=== Novels ===
- A Job to Kill For (2008, Touchstone/Simon & Schuster)
- Looks to Die For (2007, Touchstone/Simon & Schuster)
- The Men I Didn’t Marry (2006, Ballantine Books/Random House)
- Mine Are Spectacular (2005, Ballantine Books/Random House)
- The Botox Diaries (2004, Ballantine Books/Random House)
- The Whole Truth (1997, NAL paperback)
- Wild Nights (1991, St. Martin's)
- A Morning Affair (1989, NAL)
- If You Believe in Me (1984, Avon Books)
- First Ride (1982, Avon Books)

=== Non-fiction ===
- What Your Body Knows About Happiness: How to Use Your Body to Change Your Mind (Sourcebooks 2025)
- The Genius of Women: From Overlooked to Changing the World (2020, Dutton Books)
- How Luck Happens (2018, Dutton Books)
- The Gratitude Diaries (2015, Dutton Books)
- I'lll See You Again (2013, Gallery Books/Simon & Schuster)
- Women and Sports (1979, Viking)
- 10 Journalists Talk About Writing (contributor)
