= Ronni Lundy =

American writer

- Born: 1949 (age 76–77); Corbin, Kentucky, U.S.
- Occupations: Author, editor
- Writing career
- Genres: Southern American cooking, Southern American music
- Notable works: Victuals: An Appalachian Journey, with Recipes (2016)
- Notable awards: James Beard Foundation Book of the Year Award (2017)

Ronni Lundy (born 1949), is an American author and editor, whose work focuses on traditional Southern American foods, Appalachian foods, and music.

Her books include Shuck Beans, Stack Cakes and Honest Fried Chicken: The Heart and Soul of Southern Country Kitchens (Atlantic, 1991), and Butter Beans to Blackberries: Recipes from the Southern Garden (North Point, 1999). Her book Victuals: An Appalachian Journey, with Recipes (Random House, 2016) won the 2017 James Beard Foundation's Book of the Year Award. She was a founding member of the Southern Foodways Alliance and, in 2005, edited Cornbread Nation 3: Foods of the Mountain South, the organization's occasional anthology of the region's best food writing.

She has lived in Albuquerque, Galisteo, Los Cerrillos, Madrid, and Santa Fe, New Mexico; and in the mountains of North Carolina.

== Biography ==
Lundy was born in Corbin, Kentucky in 1949, and grew up in the Louisville area. Her hometown of Corbin is where the Indiana native Harland Sanders developed his recipe for Kentucky Fried Chicken. In Shuck Beans (1991) Lundy wrote: "I was born in Kentucky and Colonel Harland D. Sanders was not, so you can believe me when I say that I, not the Colonel, know the secret to making honest fried chicken."

Lundy was a pop music editor at the Louisville Times and the Louisville Courier-Journal in the 1980s and early 1990s. She focused on Americana, covering the likes of John Hartford, Emmylou Harris, Sam Bush, Dwight Yoakam and Bill Monroe. She also wrote about food and became a restaurant reviewer as the Louisville restaurant scene blossomed during the early 1990s.

Lundy's first book, Shuck Beans, Stack Cakes, and Honest Fried Chicken (1991), combined her interests in music and food. It includes interviews about favorite foods with coverage of country and bluegrass performers. Lundy has written about musicians, travel, small farms, community-supported agriculture, heirloom seeds, culinary traditions, and the "joy of eating". Her work has appeared in Esquire, Gourmet, Bon Appetit, Cooking Light, Eating Well, Sunset, and Copia. Her stories have twice been finalists for the James Beard Award, and Butter Beans was a finalist for the International Association of Culinary Professionals cookbook awards.

In 2009 Lundy was the recipient of the Southern Foodways Alliance's Craig Claiborne Lifetime Achievement Award. During the award ceremony, John Egerton said she and Elizabeth Sims helped build a culinary renaissance in Asheville, North Carolina, but Lundy has noted that this is not accurate, her involvement in Asheville's dining scene has been insignificant.

She was also the editor of a short-lived online food magazine, The Zenchilada.

== Publications ==
- Lundy, Ronni (1994). Shuck Beans, Stack Cakes, and Honest Fried Chicken: The Heart and Soul of Southern Country Kitchens. Atlantic Monthly Press. ISBN 9780871136008.
- Lundy, Ronni (1995). The Festive Table: Recipes and Stories for Creating Your Own Holiday Traditions. North Point Press. ISBN 9780374249021.
- Lundy, Ronni (1999). Butter Beans to Blackberries: Recipes from the Southern Garden. North Point.
- Lundy, Ronni (ed.). Cornbread Nation 3: Foods of the Mountain South.
- Lundy, Ronni (2016). Lam, Francis (ed.). Victuals: An Appalachian Journey, with Recipes. Clarkson Potter. ISBN 9780804186742.
