= Donald Forst =

American newspaper editor

Donald H. Forst (July 3, 1932 – January 4, 2014) was an American newspaper editor who worked for a variety of newspapers, mostly in New York, and headed New York Newsday, The Village Voice, and The Boston Herald.

== Early life and education ==
Forst was born in Crown Heights and raised in Brooklyn, where his father was a lawyer. He was educated at the University of Vermont, where he started in journalism working on the college newspaper—he said in an interview because there was an attractive girl at the sign-up table. He earned a Master's degree in journalism from Columbia University. According to Wayne Barrett of The Village Voice, he had originally wanted to play professional baseball, only his mother sent away the scouts the New York Yankees sent to the house and forbade them to contact her son again.

== Career ==
Beginning in the mid-1950s, Forst worked at fourteen periodicals in total, including the Houston Press, the Newark Star-Ledger, The Burlington Free Press, and Boston magazine. He was assistant city editor and financial editor of the New York Post and was editor-in-chief of the Boston Herald when the paper almost folded and was saved by being purchased by Rupert Murdoch in 1982. He was credited there with "turning a sleepy broadsheet into [a] lively tabloid". After working at The New York Herald Tribune until it was merged into The New York World Journal Tribune in 1966, he was cultural editor of The New York Times for a number of years.

He joined Newsday in 1971 as national editor and became managing editor, overseeing the investigative series on heroin trafficking that won a Pulitzer Prize for Public Service reporting in 1974. In 1977 he was hired to head the Los Angeles Herald-Examiner, but he returned to New York in 1985 to head the newly created New York Newsday, which won two Pulitzers during his tenure, for spot news coverage of the 1991 Union Square derailment and for Jim Dwyer's commentary. After its closure in July 1995—reportedly the day after Forst met the CEO of Times-Mirror, Newsday's parent company, for the first time—he worked for a brief time for the Queens edition of Newsday, then in February 1996 became chief metropolitan editor at the New York Daily News. He left that position by midsummer, and that fall unexpectedly became editor-in-chief at The Village Voice. At the time, the New York Times called him "the oddest choice", characterizing him as "the former bad-boy editor of New York Newsday who led that paper to two Pulitzer Prizes but also reveled in front-page cheesecake photos of Marla Maples and Donna Rice", while he himself said that he took the job "[b]ecause it was insane. It's what Karl Wallenda said: 'Life is on the wire. All the rest is waiting.' " Although during his tenure there was controversy among other things over admitted insensitivity in a 1999 cover story about a trans man, during it The Village Voice won many awards, including in 2000 a Pulitzer for international reporting for Mark Schoofs' series on AIDS in Africa.

Tony Marro, editor of Newsday from 1986 to 2002, remembered him as so competitive a newspaperman, he "wanted not only to beat the competition but to burn their houses, drive off their cattle and poison their wells" but also said that he "made working in newsrooms a lot of fun."

== Retirement and personal life ==
After retiring from The Village Voice in 2005, Forst taught journalism at the University at Albany from 2007 until late in 2013. For the first year and a half he also continued to lay out a front page for himself every morning. He died in Albany from complications of colon cancer.

Forst was married twice, from 1961 until the mid-1970s to the food writer Gael Greene, whom he met at The New York Post, and secondly to the photographer and writer Starr Ockenga. At the time of his death his companion was Val Haynes.
