= Lynne Rossetto Kasper =

American food writer and radio journalist

Lynne Rossetto Kasper is an American food writer and radio journalist. She was the founding host of the American Public Media program The Splendid Table, whose targeted audience is "people who love to eat." The weekly program features a series of interviews with chefs, restaurateurs, and wine experts. Guests vary from week to week, but the show frequently included a segment with food travelers and authors Jane and Michael Stern. During her episode on February 10, 2017, Lynne announced her retirement from The Splendid Table at the end of 2017. She was replaced by former New York Times Magazine food columnist Francis Lam.

In 1993, Kasper won the James Beard Cookbook of the Year Award for her book The Splendid Table: Recipes from Emilia Romagna, The Heartland of Northern Italian Food, which led to her starting a call-in radio show on Minnesota public radio in 1995. During her 22 years of hosting the radio show, she went on to win the prestigious James Beard Award on two occasions: in 1998 for Best National Radio Show and 2008 for Best Radio Food Show.

There is also a tomato variety, a hybrid of Matt's Wild Cherry and Black Krim, named after her.

== Bibliography ==
- The Splendid Table's, How to Eat Weekends. New York: Clarkson Potter/Publishers. 2011. ISBN 978-0-307-59055-8.
- The Splendid Table's, How to Eat Supper. New York: Clarkson Potter/Publishers. 2008. ISBN 978-0-307-34671-1.
- The Italian Country Table: Home Cooking from Italy's Farmhouse Kitchens. New York: Scribner. 1999. ISBN 0-684-81325-4.
- The Splendid Table: Recipes from Emilia-Romagna, the Heartland of Northern Italian Food. New York: W. Morrow. 1992. ISBN 0-688-08963-1.
