= Lespinasse (restaurant) =

Defunct restaurant in New York City, U.S.

- Interactive map of Lespinasse

Restaurant information
- Closed: 2003
- Location: 2 East 55th Street, New York, New York, 10022, United States
- Coordinates: 40°45′40.6″N 73°58′27.8″W

Lespinasse was a fine dining establishment initially run by and primarily associated with executive chef Gray Kunz (1955–2020). It was located in the St. Regis New York hotel in Midtown Manhattan, New York City. It was celebrated for its house culinary style termed "cuisine spontanée", a variant of nouvelle cuisine first developed by Paul Bocuse and Roger Vergé, and noted for the number of future star chefs who worked under the aegis of Kunz in its kitchen, including; Andrew Carmellini, Floyd Cardoz, Rocco DiSpirito, and Corey Lee.

Kunz, a Singapore-born Swiss, directed the eatery and served up French-Asian cuisine there until 1998. The French chef Christian Delouvrier then took over culinary control of the establishment and ran its kitchen until the restaurant closed in April 2003.
