= Floyd Cardoz =

Indian-American chef (1960–2020)

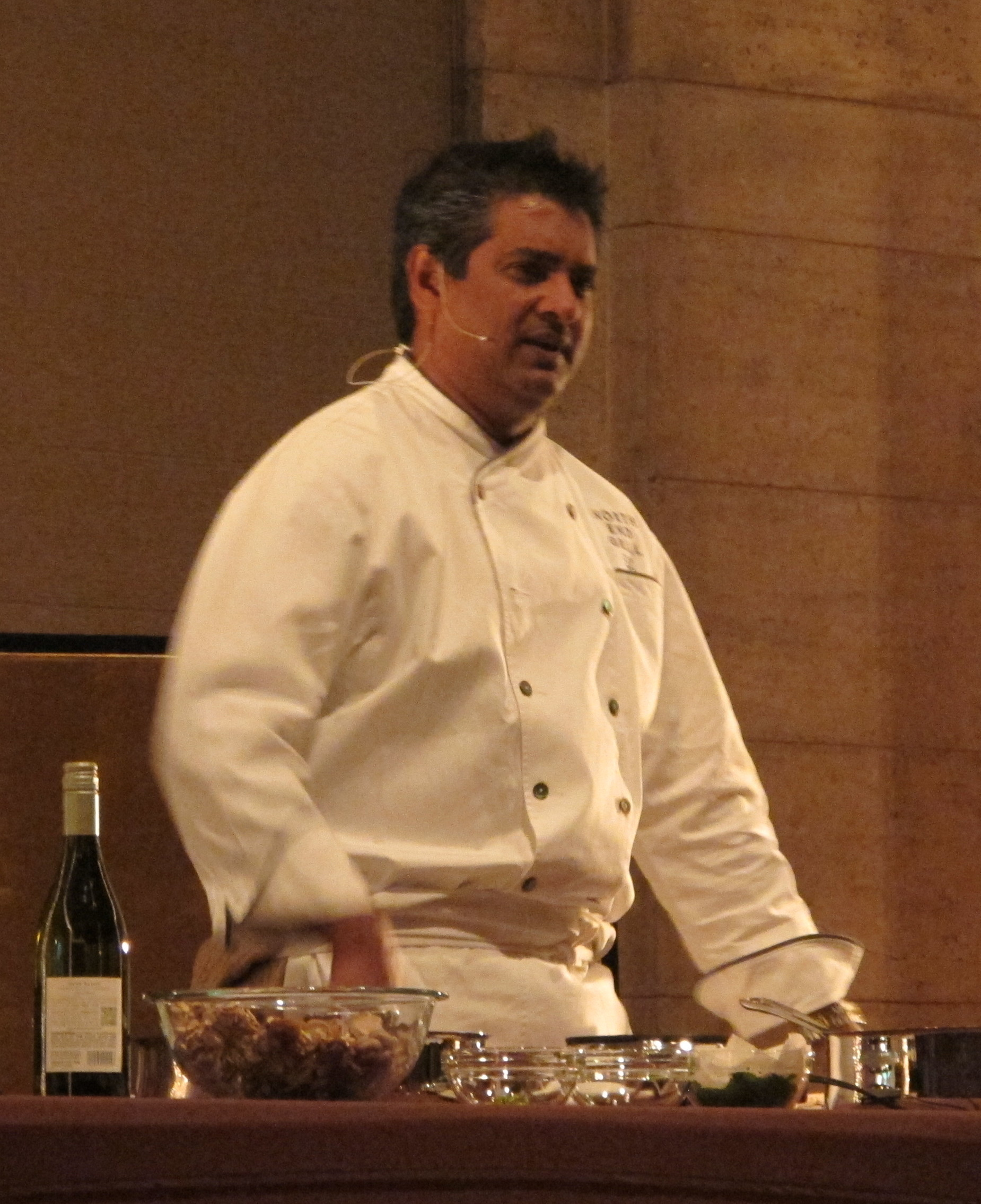
- Cardoz in 2011
- Born: October 2, 1960; Bombay, Maharashtra, India
- Died: March 25, 2020 (aged 59); Montclair, New Jersey, U.S.
- Citizenship: Indian (former); American
- Culinary career
- Cooking style: Indian

Floyd Cardoz (October 2, 1960 – March 25, 2020) was an Indian-American chef. He owned the New York City eatery Paowalla and was executive chef at Tabla, as well as victor on Top Chef Masters Season 3 in 2011. His New York restaurants were known for food melding Indian flavours and spices with western cuisine.

== Education and career ==
After attending culinary school in Mumbai, India Floyd Cardoz went to Les Roches International School of Hotel Management, Switzerland. He moved to New York in 1988. He started working under Chef Gray Kunz at Lespinasse in 1992. He worked in various roles from chef de partie to executive sous chef. In 1997, he started working with Union Square Hospitality Group where he collaborated with restaurateur Danny Meyer to open Tabla. He also opened El Verano Taqueria and North End Grill. In 2008 he launched a line of entrees with the online grocery home delivery company FreshDirect. Cardoz served as a culinary consultant to the 2014 feature film The Hundred Foot Journey, in whose storyline French and Indian cuisines fuse. In 2015 he opened The Bombay Canteen. In the summer 2016, he opened Paowalla in New York's Soho. In 2018 he closed Paowalla and redesigned it to open as Bombay Bread Bar.

== Awards and honors ==
Cardoz was a four-time James Beard Award nominee and the author of two cookbooks. He is winner of season 3 of Top Chef Masters. He donated the prize money to the Young Scientist Cancer Research Fund at Icahn School of Medicine at Mount Sinai. He was named among the "Top 50 Most Influential Global Indians" by GQ Magazine in 2011

== Personal life and death ==
Cardoz and his wife and business partner, Barkha, had two sons, Justin and Peter. Cardoz died from COVID-19 on March 25, 2020, at Mountainside Hospital in Montclair, New Jersey, at the age of 59. He had been hospitalized for a week after travelling from Mumbai to New York through Frankfurt on March 8, falling sick and testing positive for the virus.

== Legacy ==
Cardoz has been called the "godfather of modern Indian cuisine." He was the first chef born and raised in India to lead the kitchen at a prominent New York City restaurant.

New York-based food writer Priya Krishna wrote, "That Indian restaurants get to be high-end and personal and regional and cross-cultural and succeed on a large scale—we can, in large part, thank Floyd Cardoz."

Nearly a year after Cardoz's death, Andrew Rea of the BCU released an episode with Cardoz that was filmed in 2019 on cooking curry for the Basics with Babish series, which was released as its 100th episode.

== Books ==
- Floyd Cardoz: Flavorwalla: Big Flavor. Bold Spices. A New Way to Cook the Foods You Love
- One Spice, Two Spice: American Food, Indian Flavors
