= Time Machine Chefs =

- Genre: Cooking, Competition
- Presented by: Brooke Peterson
- Starring: Art Smith; Chris Cosentino; Ilan Hall; Jill Davie
- Country of origin: United States
- No. of episodes: 1

Production
- Production company: Breakfast Anytime

Original release
- Network: ABC
- Release: August 16, 2012

Time Machine Chefs is a television special that originally aired on ABC in which four celebrity chefs were challenged to cook against each other using ingredients and tools belonging to a historical era. The program was divided into two rounds; the first challenged the chefs to create a Peking duck in 16th century China during the Ming Dynasty and the second saw the chefs create a Cockentrice in 1532 in the House of Tudor.
