= Hugh Acheson =

Canadian-born chef and restaurateur (born 1971)

- Born: November 5, 1971 (age 54); Ottawa, Ontario, Canada
- Spouse: Mary Koon (div. 2017)
- Children: 2
- Culinary career
- Cooking style: Southern cuisine
- Current restaurants
- by George (Atlanta, Georgia); Ovide (Destin, Florida)
- Previous restaurants
- Five & Ten - Sold 4/2024 (Athens, Georgia); Empire State South - Closed 2/2023 (Atlanta, Georgia); The National (Athens, Georgia); The Florence (Savannah, Georgia)
- Television shows
- Top Chef; Top Chef Masters; Iron Chef Canada
- Awards
- 2 James Beard Foundation awards
- Website: www.hughacheson.com

Hugh Acheson (born November 5, 1971) is a Canadian-born chef and restaurateur. He has owned four restaurants in Georgia, and serves as a judge on the reality cooking competition show Top Chef, and as an Iron Chef on Iron Chef Canada.

== Early life ==
Acheson was born on November 5, 1971, in Ottawa, Ontario, Canada. The youngest of four children, Acheson has three older sisters. His father was a professor of economics at Ottawa's Carleton University, while his mother was a reading tutor. Acheson's parents divorced when he was young, and he was raised primarily by his father in the Manor Park and Centretown neighbourhoods of Ottawa, with the exception of two years that he spent living with his mother and stepfather in the American cities of Clemson, South Carolina, and Atlanta, Georgia.

== Career ==
Acheson took his first kitchen job when he was fifteen years old, as a dishwasher at Ottawa's Bank Street Café. He subsequently worked at other well-known Ottawa restaurants, before moving to Montreal, Quebec, to attend Concordia University. There he studied political philosophy, but he soon dropped out to work in Italian restaurants in Montreal. In 1994, Acheson moved back to Ottawa with his future wife, Mary Koon, and began working at Café Henry Burger, an iconic restaurant that closed in the 2000s after over 80 years of operation. At Henry Burger, Acheson learned about French cuisine, wine and etiquette under chef Rob McDonald. Later in the 1990s, Acheson moved with his wife from Ottawa to her hometown of Athens, Georgia so she could attend graduate school at the University of Georgia.

On the basis of his experience in French and Italian cuisine, Acheson became the head chef and manager at the Last Resort Grill upon moving to Athens. Following his wife's graduation, the couple moved to San Francisco, California, where Acheson took a job at restaurant Mecca. He subsequently worked as a sous chef for San Francisco chef Gary Danko, helping him to open his eponymous restaurant.

After approximately two years in San Francisco, Acheson and his wife returned to Athens at the request of Melissa Clegg, the owner of Last Resort, who wanted Acheson to help her open a restaurant. In turn, Acheson opened his first restaurant, Five and Ten, in Athens in 2000 and introduced Dean Neff as its executive chef in 2012. In the following years, his endeavors have included:

- A second Athens restaurant, The National, opened in 2007.
- His third eatery, Empire State South, opened in Atlanta in 2010. Empire State South closed its doors in February 2023.
- Cinco y Diez, a modern Mexican restaurant in Athens, was open from January to October 2014.
- Acheson opened The Florence in Savannah, Georgia, in Spring 2014. The Italian restaurant sourced local vegetables and seafood while serving pasta and pizza before closing in June 2017.
- In 2015, Acheson opened Spiller Park, a coffee shop in Ponce City Market, with Dale Donchey, who ran the coffee program at Empire State South. Spiller Park has continued to grow, with five locations open or in the works as of Spring 2024, though Acheson is no longer involved.
- In January 2018, Acheson opened Achie's at the Omni Hotel at The Battery Atlanta, part of the Braves stadium complex, serving "riffs on traditional Southern fare as well as dishes such as poutine, burgers, and ballpark snacks on game days." It closed in November of the same year.
- On February 2, 2021, Acheson's latest culinary business, Ovide, opened its doors as Hotel Effie's signature restaurant in Sandestin, Florida. The restaurant is a fusion of coastal cuisine with a French influence.

In April 2024, Acheson announced his was selling his only remaining Georgia restaurant, Five and Ten, to long-time partner Peter Dale.

=== Television ===
In 2011, Acheson competed on season 3 of Top Chef Masters, a reality competition show in which experienced celebrity chefs compete against each other in various challenges. He was eliminated in the first round, but subsequently returned in the second episode after another chef withdrew. He ultimately finished in fifth place out of twelve competitors. He was then invited to become a judge on season 9 of Top Chef, of which Top Chef Masters is a spin-off. Top Chef is a cooking competition show in which lesser-known chefs compete and are judged by more experienced chefs. Season 9 aired from November 2011 to February 2012. Acheson also served as a judge on season 10 of Top Chef, which ran November 2012 to February 2013. In 2013, he returned as a judge on Top Chef season 11 and as host and judge of "Battle of the Sous Chefs", a component of season 5 of Top Chef Masters.

In 2020 he appeared as a judge on the Food Network Canada competition series Wall of Chefs. In 2025, it was announced that Acheson would be one of the judges for MasterChef Canada.

=== Books ===
Acheson published his first cookbook, A New Turn in the South: Southern Flavors Reinvented for Your Kitchen, in 2011. The book was awarded the 2012 James Beard Foundation award for "Best Cookbook in American Cooking." He was also co-winner of the 2012 James Beard Award for best chef, Southeast. Hugh published his second cookbook, entitled Pick a Pickle: 50 recipes for Pickles, Relishes and Fermented Snacks, in the spring of 2014. His third cookbook was released in the spring of 2015 under the title The Broad Fork. In the fall of 2017, his fourth cookbook was published, The Chef and the Slow Cooker. In his fifth cookbook, Sous Vide: Better Home Cooking, published in October 2019, Acheson introduces many home cooks to the sous vide method of food preparation with 90 recipes to choose from.

Awards

Acheson is a James Beard Foundation award winner as both a chef and cookbook author. He has been nominated nine times, with two wins.

- Semifinalist, Outstanding Chef 2018 - Five and Ten
- Nominee, Outstanding Restaurateur 2019
- Winner, American Cooking 2012 - Best American Cookbook - A New Turn in the South: Southern Flavors Reinvented For Your Kitchen
- Nominee, Best Chefs 2007
- Nominee, Best Chefs 2008
- Nominee, Best Chefs 2009
- Nominee, Best Chefs 2010
- Nominee, Best Chefs 2011
- Winner, Best Chefs 2012 - Southeast - Five and Ten

Acheson was named one of the best new chefs in the United States by Food & Wine magazine in 2002.

== Personal life ==
Acheson was married to Mary Koon, a Georgia native who worked as an editor at the Georgia Museum of Art. They first met in middle school, when Acheson briefly lived in South Carolina with his mother. They reconnected while at university in Canada, and married two years later. They share two daughters, Beatrice and Clementine. Acheson and Koon divorced quietly in 2017, with Acheson later moving to New York City.

== Books ==
- Sous Vide: Better Home Cooking
- The Chef and the Slow Cooker
- A New Turn in the South: Southern Flavors Reinvented for Your Kitchen
- Pick a Pickle: 50 Recipes for Pickles, Relishes, and Fermented Snacks
- The Broad Fork: Recipes for the Wide World of Vegetables and Fruits
- How to Cook: Building Blocks and 100 Simple Recipes for a Lifetime of Meals
