= Gael Greene =

American restaurant critic, author, novelist (1933–2022)

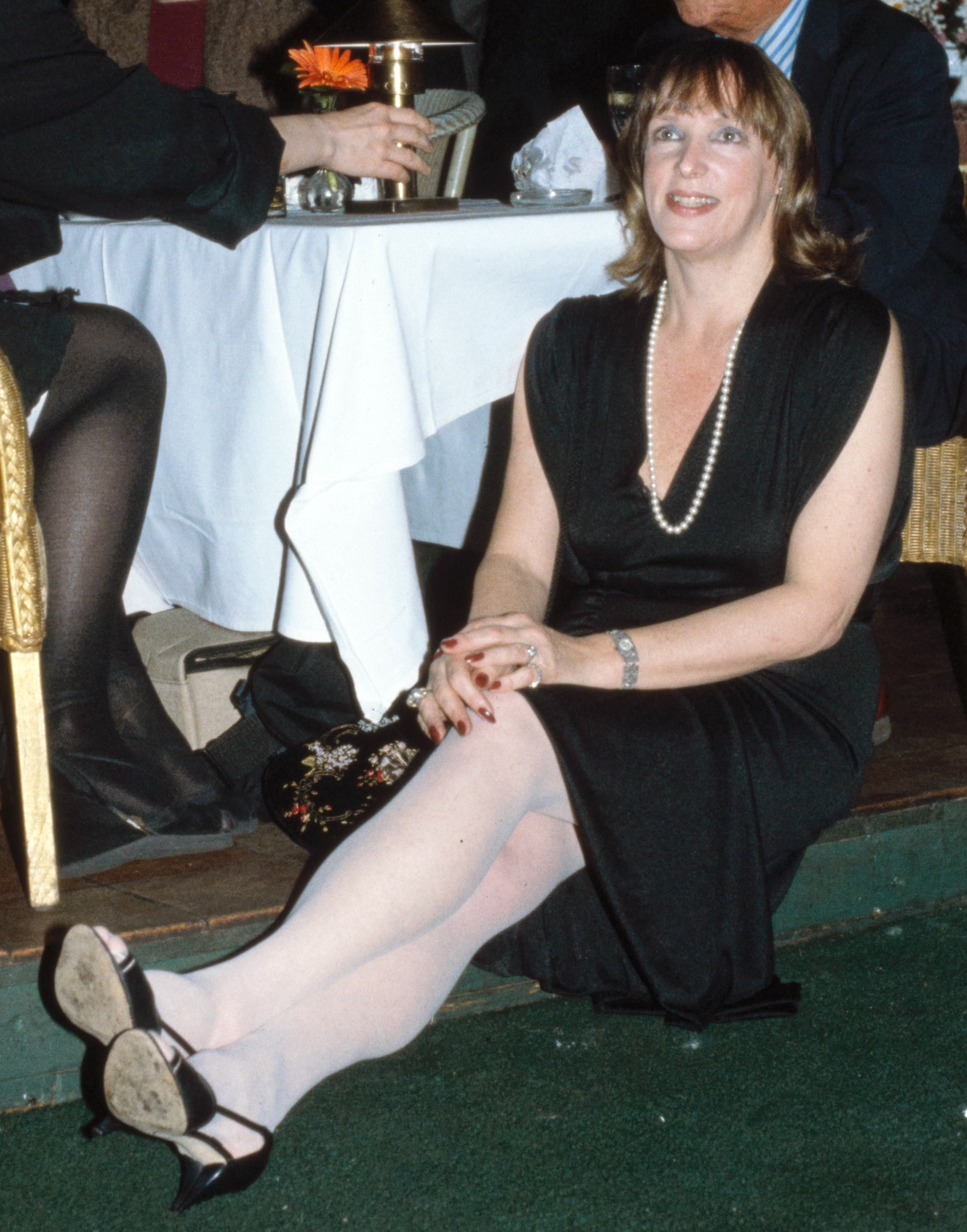
- Greene in 1982
- Born: December 22, 1933; Detroit, Michigan, U.S.
- Died: November 1, 2022 (aged 88); Manhattan, New York, U.S.
- Education: University of Michigan
- Occupation(s): Food critic, author, novelist
- Spouse: Donald H. Forst (m. 1961; div. 1974)

Gael Greene (December 22, 1933 – November 1, 2022) was an American restaurant critic, author, and novelist. She became New York magazine's restaurant critic in fall 1968, at a time when most New Yorkers were unsophisticated about food and there were few chefs anyone knew by name, and for four decades both documented and inspired the city's and America's growing obsession with food. She was a pioneering "foodie."

== Life and career ==
Greene was born in Detroit, where her father owned a clothing store, and graduated from Central High School in 1951, then from the University of Michigan. She said that her passion for food was awakened by a year abroad in Paris while she was an undergraduate. She worked as an investigative reporter for UPI then the New York Post, for example pretending to be single and pregnant for an investigation of baby trafficking, and was made a food writer after her editor liked an article she wrote about chef Henri Soulé.

Greene became food reporter at New York soon after its launch, in fall 1968. Her articles had provocative titles like "Everything You Always Wanted to Know About Ice Cream But Were Too Fat To Ask", "The Mafia Guide to Dining Out", and "Nobody Knows the Truffles I've Seen". She was a passionate early "foodie" and is sometimes credited with being the first to use the word, in the early 1980s.

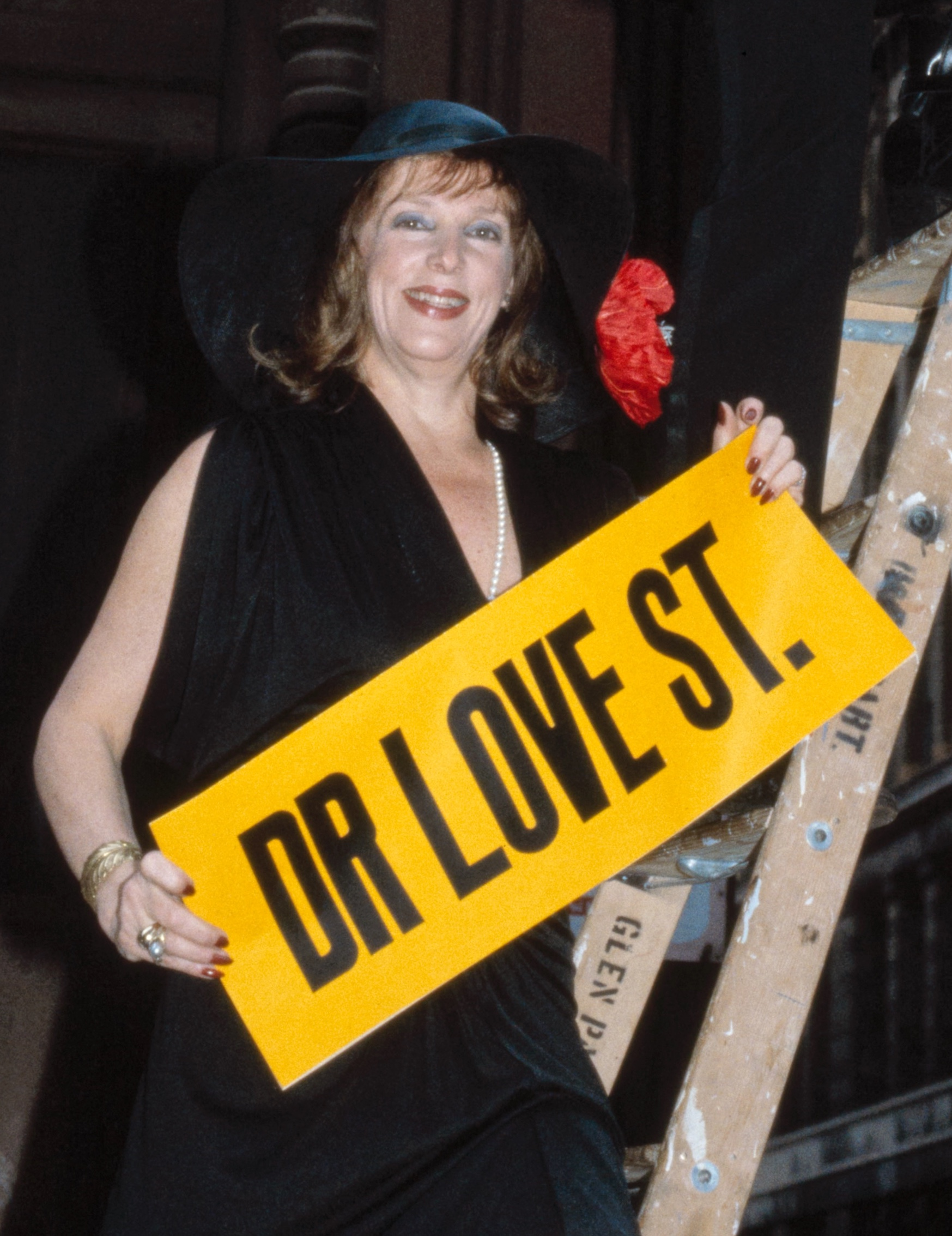
Gael Greene in large hat and with "Dr Love" street sign promoting her novel, in 1982

Greene famously went to great lengths to conceal her identity from restaurateurs, reserving and using credit cards under other names and wearing hats that covered her eyes. She both received love letters from readers and praise from chefs and was known as a "merciless" critic, "the Dorothy Parker of restaurant critics".

After more than 30 years as the magazine's "insatiable critic", Greene retired for "a more normal life" in 2000. She began her own website, InsatiableCritic.com, but continued as a columnist until her dismissal in 2008.

Glenn Collins wrote in The New York Times: "But even among those who might have seen it coming, many were taken aback at the expulsion of the sensualist who influenced the way a generation of New Yorkers ate, and who served as a lusty narrator of restaurant life in New York for decades." "It's as if they removed the lions from the library steps," said Michael Batterberry, editor and publisher of Food Arts magazine.

She then moved to Crain's New York, where she contributed reviews from 2008 to 2012, and appeared as a judge for the first two seasons of the TV show Top Chef Masters.

Greene often employed sexual metaphors in describing food, both as a way to convey the intensity of the experience and because for her "sex and food have always been deeply intertwined." She once wrote that "the two greatest discoveries of the 20th century were the Cuisinart and the clitoris". She wrote two erotic novels. The first, Blue Skies, No Candy, a best seller in both hard cover and paperback, explores the fantasies and adventures of an adulterous heroine; it was unpopular with critics and ads for it were removed from New York City Subway cars after complaints about their suggestive imagery. The second, Doctor Love, is written from the perspective of a Don Juan. Doctor Love received some negative reviews, including Jonathan Yardley's verdict of "terminal tackiness" in The Washington Post.

In 2006, Warner Books published her memoir, Insatiable: Tales from a life of Delicious Excess, about the 40-year revolution in dining, what she ate, and what she did between meals. It includes affairs with chefs and movie stars and a sexual encounter with Elvis Presley in 1957. Her other books include Delicious Sex, Bite: A New York Restaurant Strategy for Hedonists, Masochists, Selective Penny Pinchers and the Upwardly Mobile and Sex and the College Girl. She was also a major contributor to The Cosmo Girl's Guide to the New Etiquette in 1972.

In 1981 she co-founded Citymeals-on-Wheels, along with the teacher and food writer James Beard, to help fund weekend and holiday meals for homebound elderly people in New York City. She remained an active chair of the company's board, hosting an annual Power Lunch for Women. Greene received numerous awards for her work with Citymeals and in 1992 was honored as Humanitarian of the Year by the James Beard Foundation. She was the winner of the International Association of Cooking Professionals' magazine writing award (2000) and a Silver Spoon from Food Arts magazine.

== Personal life and death ==
Greene married Donald H. Forst, whom she met at The New York Post, in 1961. They divorced 13 years later. Greene died from cancer in Manhattan on November 1, 2022, at the age of 88.
