= James Oseland =

American writer, editor and television personality

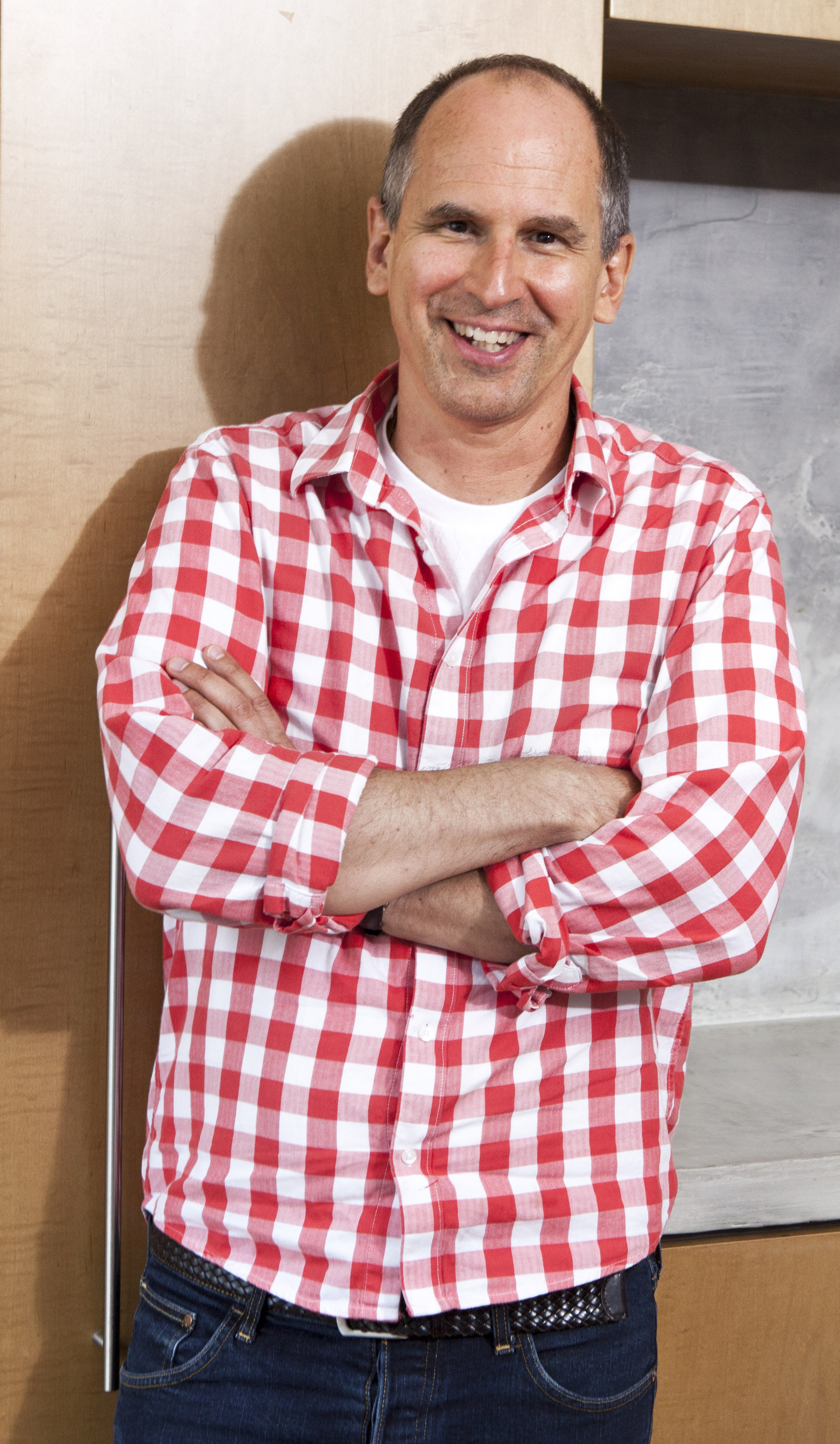
- Oseland in 2012
- Born: February 9, 1963 (age 63); Mountain View, California
- Education: San Francisco Art Institute, BFA & MFA
- Occupations: Author; Editor; Television personality
- Notable work: Publications: American Theatre, L.A. Weekly, Saveur, Time Out New York.; Books: A Fork In the Road, Cradle of Flavor, Jimmy Neurosis, Saveur: The New Classics, Saveur: The New Comfort Food
- Website: jamesoseland.com

James Oseland is an American writer, editor and television personality. He is the author and editor-in-chief of World Food, an acclaimed book series from Ten Speed Press. He served as editor-in-chief of the U.S. food magazine Saveur from 2006 to 2014. His memoir and cookbook Cradle of Flavor (2006, W.W. Norton) was named one of the best books of 2006 by The New York Times, Time Asia, and Good Morning America, among others. He has edited an array of bestselling and award-winning anthologies and cookbooks, notably Saveur: The New Comfort Food (2011, Chronicle), A Fork In the Road (2013, Lonely Planet), and Saveur: The New Classics (2014, Weldon Owen). His writing has appeared in The Wall Street Journal, Gourmet, Vogue, and dozens of other media outlets. He was a judge from 2009 to 2013 on the Bravo television series Top Chef Masters.

Oseland is the author of Jimmy Neurosis (2019, Ecco Press), a critically acclaimed coming-of-age memoir set against the California and New York City punk rock movements of the late 1970s. Out called the book "nonstop entertainment," while Rolling Stone hailed it as a "vibrant coming-of-age memoir [told] in an instantly lovable voice."

== Early life and education ==
Oseland was born on February 9, 1963, in Mountain View, California. His father, Lawrence Oseland, worked in office-products sales; his mother, Bernice Oseland, was a homemaker and secretary. As a child, he moved often. He was raised in Sunnyvale, California; Mercer Island, Washington; Yukon, Oklahoma; Buffalo Grove, Illinois; St. Paul; San Carlos, California; San Francisco; and New York City. He began attending San Carlos High School in 1977; he came out to his parents as gay the same year.

From 1978 to 1980 Oseland was a participant in the nascent punk rock musical and artistic movements taking place in San Francisco and New York City. In 1979, aged 16, he dropped out of high school and moved to New York City, where he lived with his 37 year old boyfriend. Oseland returned to the West Coast to attend the San Francisco Art Institute, where he studied filmmaking with George Kuchar and Mike Kuchar. He completed his bachelor's degree and Masters of Fine Arts in filmmaking in 1983 and 1985, respectively.

After college, Oseland lived in Los Angeles for seven years. He studied acting at the Loft Studio with the acclaimed acting coach William Traylor and was involved in Southern California's underground theater scene, including as a performer and director at the Padua Hills Playwright Festival (Padua Playwrights). He worked as a screenplay reader for Triad Artists Agency. In the early 1990s he shifted his creative focus to journalism.

== Career ==
Magazine and Book Publishing

Oseland's first journalism job was as a proofreader at the LA Weekly in 1990. In 1993, he returned to New York City, where he held editorial positions that ranged from copy editor to managing editor; between 1993 and 2006 he worked at various publications, including Vogue, Organic Style, TV Guide's Celebrity Dish, Vibe, Time Out New York, Sassy, American Theatre, The Village Voice and Mademoiselle. From 1996 to 1998 he was a theater critic for Time Out New York. In 1997, he was awarded a Jerome Foundation fellowship administered by American Theatre magazine for his theater criticism. A year later, he became managing editor of American Theatre.

From 1997 to 2006 he was a contributor as a writer and photographer to Saveur, a culinary magazine that has been called “the National Geographic of food.” In 2006, he became executive editor then editor-in-chief of the magazine. Under his editorial leadership, the publication saw unprecedented growth; subscription-renewal rates were among the highest in the American magazine industry during the period he was editor. He founded and oversaw the publication's Blog Awards as well its acclaimed video series. During his tenure, Saveur garnered more than 45 awards from numerous organizations, including the American Society of Magazine Editors, the James Beard Foundation, the International Association of Culinary Professionals, and the Society for Newspaper and Magazine Design.

In 2014 he left Saveur and became the founding editor-in-chief of Rodale's Organic Life, a lifestyle publication that was named the hottest magazine launch of 2015 by Adweek. During the time he was at the publication, he was twice named one of the “Most Intriguing People in Media” by the Media Industry News.

He departed from Rodale's Organic Life in 2016 to begin creating World Food, a book series from Ten Speed Press, an imprint of Penguin Random House. The series features multiple editions, each of which will explore the cuisine of a specific region: its restaurants and street-food cultures, markets and food stores, chefs and home cooks. It premiered in 2020 with World Food: Mexico City, which was selected as one of the best books of the year by Town and Country magazine and the Atlanta Journal-Constitution. It will be followed by World Food: Paris in October 2021.

Oseland is also the author of the memoir and cookbook called Cradle of Flavor: Home Cooking from the Spice Islands of Indonesia, Malaysia, and Singapore, which celebrates the culinary cultures of a part of the world Oseland has been traveling to since 1982. It was published by W.W. Norton in 2006 and was widely lauded. Publishers Weekly wrote, “Oseland…hopes to help people who haven’t had the benefit of a trip to West Sumatra or Kuala Lumpur to discover those places’ scents and tastes. Oseland devotes close to half the book to explaining ingredients, techniques and eating traditions as well as relating anecdotes from 20 years of roaming the islands and picking up the natives’ cooking wisdom.”

Cradle of Flavor was named one of the best books of 2006 by The New York Times, Time Asia, the San Francisco Chronicle, the Minneapolis Star-Tribune and Good Morning America, among others. It also won a James Beard Award and an International Association of Culinary Professionals cookbook award.

Oseland’s next book was a widely admired coming-of-age memoir called Jimmy Neurosis published by Ecco Press, an imprint of HarperCollins. The book chronicles Oseland’s turbulent teenage years; he was a participant in the grassroots punk rock movements that were occurring in San Francisco and New York between 1977 and 1980. Publishers Weekly called the book "stunning, heartbreaking, inspiring, wild, and thrilling." The Los Angeles Times said of the book, "What makes such a story important, after all, is not only that it happened to Oseland but also that, in the telling, it begins to echo the similar passages we all share. This is the universality of the particular, the way the writer’s experiences connect to, or enlarge, the experiences of the reader, until we are bound together in our common humanity."

Oseland has also edited numerous books, including Saveur: The New Comfort Food (2011, Chronicle); Saveur: The Way We Cook (2012, Weldon Owen); Saveur: The New Classics (2014, Weldon Owen); and A Fork In the Road: Tales of Food, Pleasure and Discovery on the Road (2013, Lonely Planet), a food-writing anthology which was a 2014 James Beard Award nominee and won a Travel Writers Foundation Lowell Thomas award. The book includes original writing from André Aciman, Francine Prose, and Michael Pollan, among others.

Oseland served two terms on the board of directors of the American Society of Magazine Editors.

Television, Film, Theater and Radio

Oseland was a judge on the hit Bravo television show Top Chef Masters from 2009 to 2013. His quirky, descriptive commentary brought humor and wit to the judges’ critiques.

He has also been a judge on NBC’s Celebrity Apprentice and the Food Network’s Iron Chef America, and has appeared frequently on NBC’s The Today Show, ABC’s Live with Kelly and Ryan (formerly The Kelly and Michael Show), and VH1’s Big Morning Buzz Live. In 2013, he starred as himself in a series of Wendy's commercials.

While a student at the San Francisco Art Institute, Oseland made eight experimental films, including Fisherisms (1980) and From a Picture of Ants (1983). His films have been screened at San Francisco's Cinematheque, among other venues. In 1984, his work earned him grants from the Jerome Foundation as well as the Western States Regional Media Fellowship, a grant program administered by the National Endowment for the Arts.

As an actor, Oseland appeared in the films Dracula’s Widow (1988, Christopher Coppola), Liquid Dreams (1991, Mark Manos), and Guncrazy (1992, Tamra Davis). He has also appeared in numerous underground films, including Agent of Paradise (1984, Mary Bellis), Ascension of the Demonoids (1985, George Kuchar), and Cupid’s Infirmary (1993, Mike Kuchar).

Oseland was involved in the Los Angeles experimental theater scene from 1987 to 1993. He appeared in numerous productions at the CAST Theater and the Padua Hills Playwright Festival (Padua Playwrights) including Taxi Dance (1989, Kelly Stuart), Place (1990, Robert Hummer), and The Interpreter of Horror (1991, Kelly Stuart).

Oseland has been a guest on more than a hundred radio programs, including PRI’s The Splendid Table and WNYC’s Leonard Lopate Show. He also hosts WHDD's program Food Traveler.
