= The Splendid Table =

Radio show and podcast

- Genre: Food and drink
- Running time: 60 minutes
- Country of origin: United States
- Language(s): English
- Home station: Minnesota Public Radio
- Syndicates: American Public Media
- Hosted by: Francis Lam
- Original release: 4 January 1997 – present
- Website: www.splendidtable.org

The Splendid Table is a weekly radio program about food hosted by Francis Lam. The program began in 1997 on Minnesota Public Radio, and was originally hosted by Lynne Rossetto Kasper until her retirement in 2017. It is produced and distributed by American Public Media and airs weekends nationwide on public radio stations. It provides listeners with information on food preparation, appreciation, and culture. The program features travel-related material on restaurants and cuisine from around the country and the world, and also features talk segments in which the host takes calls from listeners with food-related questions. Guests vary from week to week, but have longtime contributors such as food writers Jane and Michael Stern. The program's tagline is "the radio show for people who love to eat". The show served as an inspiration for the popular Saturday Night Live skit "The Delicious Dish".

== Awards ==
- Named "1998 Best National Radio Show on Food" by the James Beard Foundation
- Named "2000 Best National Syndicated Talk Show" by American Women in Radio and Television
- Named "2008 Best National Radio Show on Food" by the James Beard Foundation

== See also ==
- List of food podcasts
