= Top Chef Masters =

American reality television series

- Genre: Cooking; Reality competition
- Presented by: Kelly Choi; Curtis Stone
- Judges: James Oseland; Gail Simmons; Jay Rayner; Gael Greene; Ruth Reichl; Francis Lam; Krista Simmons; Lesley Suter
- Country of origin: United States
- Original language: English
- No. of seasons: 5
- No. of episodes: 50

Production
- Executive producers: Dan Cutforth; Jane Lipsitz
- Running time: 42 minutes
- Production company: Magical Elves Productions

Original release
- Network: Bravo
- Release: June 10, 2009 – September 25, 2013

Top Chef Masters is an American reality competition series that aired on the cable television network Bravo between June 10, 2009, and September 25, 2013. A spinoff of Bravo's hit show Top Chef, the show was produced by Magical Elves and mostly filmed in Los Angeles. Professional chefs competed to win $100,000, an amount won by Rick Bayless, Marcus Samuelsson, Floyd Cardoz, Chris Cosentino, and Douglas Keane. A combination of Stone, James Oseland, Gael Greene, Jay Rayner, Gail Simmons, Ruth Reichl, Krista Simmons, Francis Lam, and Lesley Suter judged each series, while Kelly Choi hosted the first two series and Curtis Stone hosted the final three.

== Background and history ==
Top Chef was launched on Bravo in 2006 and featured civilians called 'cheftestants' competing for $100,000, a feature in Food & Wine magazine, and a showcase at the Food & Wine Classic in Aspen. The programme frequently had guests as judges, prompting the programme's judges Tom Colicchio and Hubert Keller to consider mounting a derivative of the programme for professionals. Bravo announced Top Chef Masters in July 2008 and its lineup in April 2009; ex-model Kelly Choi was to host, while the judges comprised Saveur editor-in-chief James Oseland, New York Magazine restaurant critic Gael Greene, and British writer Jay Rayner. Rayner's participation prompted explainer articles as to who he was, as American audiences were unfamiliar with him.

Episodes were filmed in Los Angeles, with production handled by Magical Elves, and each featured a quickfire challenge scored blind out of five and an elimination challenge. Winners won $100,000 for a charity of their choice. The first season was won by Rick Bayless, who beat two runners up including Keller. Among the guest judges for that series was Colicchio and Gail Simmons, who joined the panel for season two; that series was won by Marcus Samuelsson.

Choi was replaced with Australian chef Curtis Stone in January 2011 and Greene and Rayner with Gourmet writer Ruth Reichl that March, with Stone also judging. Rayner attributed his sacking to the production company not wanting two non-American voices judging. From season three, winning a quickfire challenge won $5,000 and an elimination challenge $10,000, and chefs were no longer graded on a scale. The season was won by Floyd Cardoz.

Production moved to Las Vegas for the fourth season, which was judged by Oseland, Reichl, journalist Krista Simmons, and Gilt Taste editor Francis Lam and won by Chris Cosentino. For the fifth and final series, the series returned to Los Angeles. Chefs were paired with sous chefs, who competed in Battle of the Sous Chefs, a parallel online-only series presented by Hugh Acheson; winning and losing sous chefs won their master chefs advantages and disadvantages. Episodes were judged by Oseland, Lam, Reichl, Los Angeles Magazine editor Lesley Suter, and a returning Gail Simmons, who was head judge. Douglas Keane won the series.

== Seasons ==
Season	Winner	Charity	Air dates	Host	Judges
1	Rick Bayless	Frontera Farmer Foundation	June 10, 2009 – August 19, 2009	Kelly Choi	James Oseland; Gael Greene; Jay Rayner; Gail Simmons
2	Marcus Samuelsson	UNICEF Tap Project	April 7, 2010 – June 9, 2010	Kelly Choi	James Oseland; Gael Greene; Jay Rayner; Gail Simmons
3	Floyd Cardoz	Young Scientist Cancer Research Fund	April 6, 2011 – June 15, 2011	Curtis Stone	James Oseland; Gael Greene; Ruth Reichl
4	Chris Cosentino	The Michael J. Fox Foundation	July 25, 2012 – September 26, 2012	Curtis Stone	James Oseland; Ruth Reichl; Krista Simmons; Francis Lam
5	Douglas Keane	Green Dog Rescue Project	July 24, 2013 – September 25, 2013	Curtis Stone	James Oseland; Gail Simmons; Ruth Reichl; Lesley Suter; Francis Lam
