= Celebrity Dish =

Celebrity Dish also known as TV Guide's Celebrity Dish is a 2000 60 minute American Food Network Television cooking show which was hosted by Mark McEwen which premiered on June 22, 2000.

== Description ==
As the name implies, this series of TV specials featured television and movie celebrities cooking their favorite foods.

Yasmine Bleeth appeared in Episode SPCDSP02, TV Guide Celebrity Dish II, the 2nd edition of the series. John Spencer, Nancy O'Dell and Jack Wagner also were scheduled to appear on the 2nd edition of the specials.

The first edition of TV Guide's Celebrity Dish showcased Paul Sorvino, Michael Boatman, Catherine Hicks and Susan Lucci.

TV Guide's Celebrity Dish: Holiday Entertaining was another special hosted by McEwan which revealed holiday entertainment tips from celebrities like Jane Seymour, Julia Sweeney and Ed Bradley.

== Cast ==
- Mark McEwen .... Host
- Betsy Foldes .... narrator
- Yasmine Bleeth .... Herself
- Michael Boatman .... Himself
- Ed Bradley .... Himself
- Michael Chiklis .... Himself
- Whoopi Goldberg .... Herself
- Patricia Heaton .... Herself
- Catherine Hicks .... Herself
- Susan Lucci .... Herself
- Nancy O'Dell .... Herself
- Jane Seymour .... Herself
- Paul Sorvino .... Himself
- John Spencer .... Himself
- Julia Sweeney .... Herself
- Jack Wagner .... Himself

== Production credits ==
- Paul Shavelson (Director)
- Janice Kaplan (Executive Producer)
- Jeanne Wolf (Executive Producer)
- Paul Shavelson (Producer)
- Alicia M. Tripi {Department Head Hair Stylist and Makeup Artist}
- Doug Masla (Music Composer)
- Food Network (Production Company)
