= Le Cordon Bleu College of Culinary Arts Atlanta =

Coordinates: 33.83905°N 84.23881°W

- Type: Private, For Profit
- Active: 2003–2017
- President: Dr. Glenn R. Mack
- Address: 1927 Lakeside Parkway; Tucker, GA 30084, Tucker, Georgia, United States
- Website: Le Cordon Bleu College of Culinary Arts Atlanta

Le Cordon Bleu College of Culinary Arts Atlanta was a two-year private for-profit college in Georgia. The college was owned by Career Education Corporation under a licensing agreement with Le Cordon Bleu in Paris. The branch campus was established in April 2003 and all US Cordon Bleu College locations closed in September 2017.

== Academics ==
There were four programs offered at Le Cordon Bleu College of Culinary Arts Atlanta; both tracks focus on classical cooking methods, all facets of food preparation, and baking skills.

Associate

- Le Cordon Bleu Culinary Arts
- Le Cordon Bleu Pâtisserie and Baking

Certificate

- Le Cordon Bleu Culinary Arts
- Le Cordon Bleu Pâtisserie and Baking

== Admissions ==
Requirements for admission in Le Cordon Bleu College of Culinary Arts - Atlanta were proof of high school graduation, application, and personal interview.

== Campus ==
The school's campus featured professional kitchens with industry-current equipment and an on-site restaurant. The college library also offered an assortment of books, periodicals, videos and computer labs for student use.

== Accreditation ==
Le Cordon Bleu College of Culinary Arts Atlanta was accredited by the Accrediting Council for Independent Colleges and Schools (ACICS). Since it did not have regional accreditation, many regionally accredited schools are reluctant to accept its credits in transfer or recognize its degrees for entry into graduate programs.
