= Francis Lam =

American writer, editor, and radio host

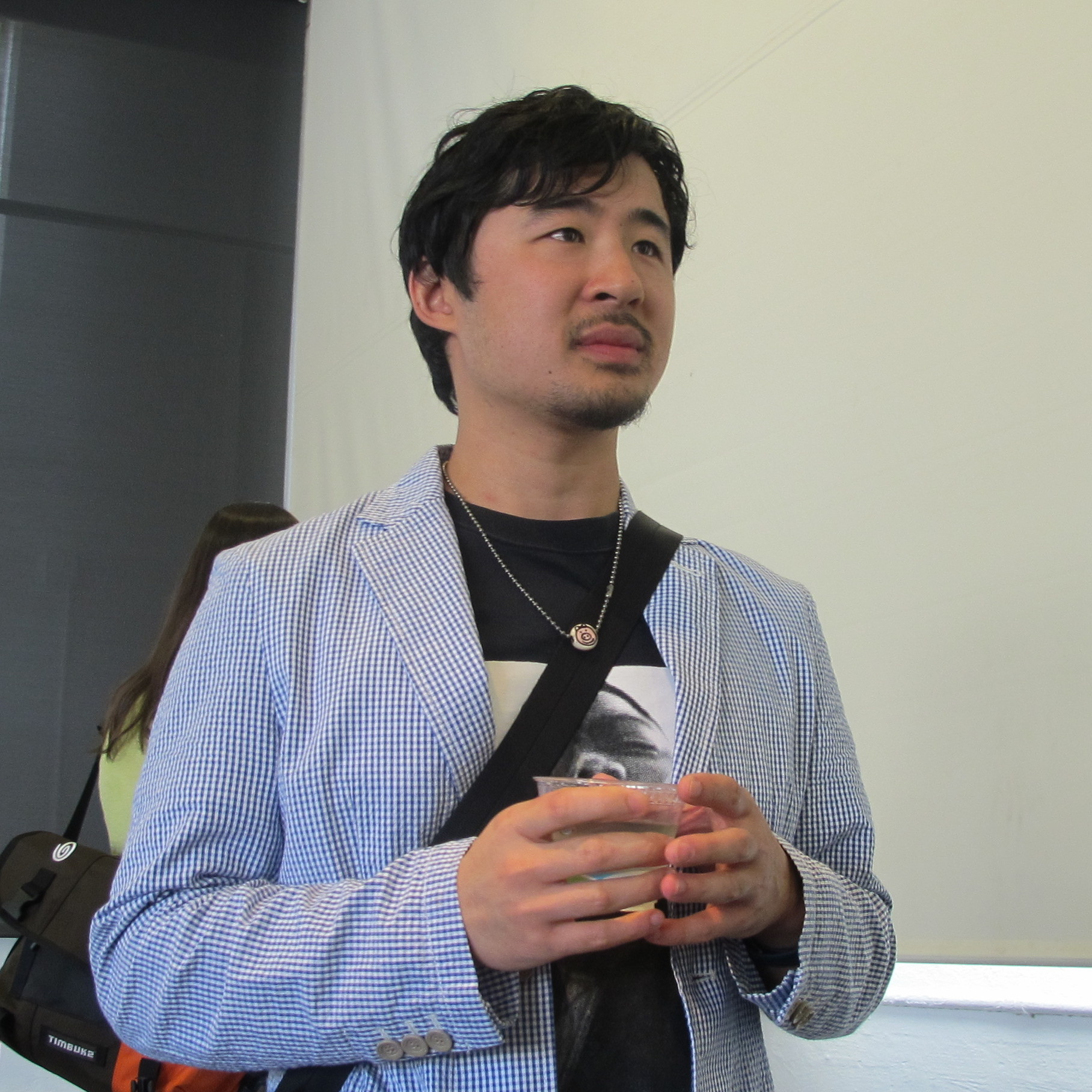
Lam in 2011

Francis Lam is an American food journalist, cookbook editor, and since 2017 the host of American Public Media's The Splendid Table.

== Early life and education ==
Lam was born to Chinese immigrant parents living in New Jersey and working in Manhattan's Chinatown, where they operated a small garment factory. His mother wanted him to go to business, dental, or medical school. Lam remembers trying to hide his "stinky lunches" from schoolmates and that he "wanted to eat what white people ate."

Lam attended the University of Michigan, where he majored in creative writing and Asian studies, graduating in 1997. He graduated first in his class from The Culinary Institute of America (CIA) in 2003.

== Career ==
After graduating from Michigan, Lam moved back to New York and worked as a grant writer for non-profit organizations before attending CIA.

While at CIA, he wrote emails to friends describing his experiences. The emails got passed around, and he was contacted by an editor at Financial Times who had read some of them and asked Lam to write for the publication. In 2004 he met Ruth Reichl, then editor of Gourmet, and started freelancing for Gourmet.

In 2007 he received a contract from Gourmet for regular work. At the time he was living in Biloxi, Mississippi, working part-time for a non-profit helping with cleanup after Hurricane Katrina. In 2009 he moved back to New York.

He has written for Food & Wine, Salon and Bon Appétit and wrote a regular column, Eat, about immigrant cooking for New York Times Magazine.

In 2013 he became editor-at-large at Clarkson Potter, editing cookbooks. One of his first acquisitions was Victuals: An Appalachian Journey by Ronni Lundy. He also acquired Tacos: Recipes and Provocations by Alex Stupak and Jordana Rothman, Food of Northern Thailand by Austin Bush, The Jemima Code by Toni Tipton-Martin, Night + Market by Kris Yenbamroong, Chrissy Teigen's Cravings, Eat a Little Better by Sam Kass, and Ryan Jacobs' Truffle Underground.

He was a contributor to and guest host for American Public Media’s The Splendid Table radio show from 2010 until being named in 2017 as the replacement for retiring host Lynne Rossetto Kasper. He served two seasons as a judge for Top Chef Masters. He is a board member for Southern Foodways Alliance.

== Personal life ==
Lam met his wife, Christine Gaspar, in Biloxi, Mississippi, while they were both working for organizations helping rebuild after Hurricane Katrina. They married in July 2013. They live in New York City and have a child.

== Awards ==
=== Writing ===
- 2017 James Beard Foundation Award for Journalism/Humor for Recipes with Roots: The True Meaning of Turkey in Cooking Light
- 2017 James Beard Foundation Award forJournalism/Column for Eat in New York Times Magazine (two awards)
- 2017 International Association of Culinary Professionals (IACP) for Food-Focused Column in New York Times Magazine
- 2016 James Beard Foundation Award forJournalism/Column for Eat in New York Times Magazine
- 2016 IACP for Narrative Food Writing for What Edna Lewis Knew in New York Times Magazine
- 2016 IACP for Food Focused Column for New York Times Magazine
- 2014 James Beard Foundation Award forJournalism/Profile for A Day on Long Island with Alex Lee in Lucky Peach

=== Editing ===
- 2018 IACP for Best Single Subject for Hello, My Name Is Ice Cream: The Art and Science of the Scoop by Dana Cree
- 2017 James Beard Award winner for both Best American Book and Book of the Year for Victuals: An Appalachian Journey by Ronni Lundy
- 2017 IACP for American Cookbook for Victuals: An Appalachian Journey by Ronni Lundy
- 2016 IACP for Best Chefs and Restaurants for Tacos: Recipes and Provocations by Alex Stupak and Jordana Rothman
