= Saveur =

American food magazine

- Cover of the Fall/Winter 2024 issue
- Editor-in-chief: Kat Craddock
- Categories: Food and wine magazines
- Frequency: Twice-yearly
- Total circulation: 329,136 (December 2012)
- Founded: 1994
- Company: Another Little Whisk LLC.
- Country: United States
- Based in: New York City
- Website: saveur.com
- ISSN: 1075-7864

Saveur is an online gourmet, food, wine, and travel magazine that publishes essays about various world cuisines. The publication was co-founded by Dorothy Kalins, Michael Grossman, Christopher Hirsheimer, and Colman Andrews. It was started by Meigher Communications in 1994.

World Publications bought Saveur and Garden Design in 2000. In October 2020, Bonnier Corporation sold Saveur, along with several other publications, to venture equity group North Equity.

In April 2023, Saveur was purchased by one of its longtime editors, Kat Craddock, and her investment partner. A popular feature has been the "Saveur 100", an annual list of "favorite restaurants, food, drink, people, places and things".

== History ==
Saveur was created by Dorothy Kalins, then editor-in-chief of Metropolitan Home magazine. Kalins launched the new food magazine with Christopher Hirsheimer (who produced food stories for Metropolitan Home) and Colman Andrews (who wrote a column for the same magazine). Kalins served as Saveur's founding editor-in-chief, with Michael Grossman as the creative director, Andrews as executive editor, and Hirsheimer as food editor. Saveur was originally published six times a year by Meigher Communications, a now-defunct publishing company.

Saveur's first issue hit the stands in the summer of 1994 with a 13-page cover story about the famed moles of Oaxaca, Mexico, complete with photos from the region's food markets and home kitchens, and a step-by-step visual guide to making chicken and mole-filled tamales. That inaugural issue also included articles on a mail-order source for freshly milled flour from Kansas, Trappist beer in Belgium and a behind-the-scenes look at a pizza trade show in Las Vegas.

Kalins departed Saveur in 2000 after the magazine was purchased by World Publications, a special interest magazine company based in Winter Park, Florida. Under World Publications, the magazine was published eight times a year. Andrews served as in editor-in-chief until 2006; he departed shortly after Bonnier, the Swedish media company, purchased a minority stake in World Publications.

James Oseland, a regular Saveur writer who was brought on by Andrews as executive editor, became editor-in-chief in 2006 and built a new editorial team. While hewing to the magazine's original mission, the new editors welcomed a growing readership with special feature packages and single-topic issues, each of which tackled a single theme in depth. Essayists, novelists, comedians, and others have discussed the subject of food in the pages of Saveur:

In 2014, the editors of Saveur published Saveur: The New Classics Cookbook. Contributors included James Oseland and Helen Rosner.

In February 2021, Saveur announced they were ceasing physical publication in favor of an online-only presence. However, in November 2023, Craddock announced that the print magazine would be returning, albeit with some changes in the interest of sustainability. The relaunched Saveur will be released in a twice-yearly format, starting with a Spring/Summer issue in March 2024.

== Blog awards ==
In 2010, Saveur opened nominations for the inaugural "Best Food Blog Awards" in nine categories. In 2011, readers voted for their favorite food blogs in 17 categories, including Best Food Photography, Best Regional Cuisine Blog, and Best Kitchen Tools and Hardware Coverage. 2014 was the first year featuring "Reader's Choice" and "Editor's Choice" winners. The 2015 awards honored 78 blogs in 13 categories. The winners of Saveur awards include David Lebovitz, Deb Perelman, Molly Yeh, Joy Wilson, and Michał Korkosz.
