= Iron Chef Gauntlet =

American cooking competition show

- Genre: Reality television Cooking show
- Directed by: Eytan Keller
- Starring: Alton Brown
- Country of origin: United States
- Original language: English
- No. of seasons: 2
- No. of episodes: 12

Production
- Executive producers: Matt Berkowitz; Eytan Keller; Stephen Kroopnick; Stu Schreiberg
- Producer: Jonathan Bourne
- Production location: New York City
- Running time: 60 minutes
- Production company: Triage Entertainment

Original release
- Network: Food Network
- Release: April 16, 2017 – May 9, 2018

Related
- Iron Chef; Iron Chef America; The Next Iron Chef; Iron Chef Showdown; Iron Chef: Quest for an Iron Legend

Iron Chef Gauntlet is a television series on Food Network that began airing on April 16, 2017. The series is a reboot of the Iron Chef and Iron Chef America series that gained popularity on Food Network and is hosted by Alton Brown, who also takes over as the series' Chairman. Seven chefs from around the country battle each other in an elimination contest, with the last chef remaining then facing a "gauntlet" challenge of defeating three other Iron Chefs in order to earn the title of Iron Chef. In the first season, the Iron Chefs forming the Gauntlet were Bobby Flay, Masaharu Morimoto, and Michael Symon. The second season of Iron Chef Gauntlet began airing April 4, 2018 and was scheduled for six episodes. The Gauntlet Iron Chefs for the second season were Alex Guarnaschelli, Gauntlet season one winner Stephanie Izard, and Michael Symon.

== Overview ==
Each regular episode consists of two challenges. The first is the Chairman's Challenge, with Brown announcing a theme in which all chefs must cook a dish for him to judge. The loser of this round is entered into the second round; the winner is safe from elimination for the week and may nominate one other chef to compete in the second round.

The second round is the Secret Ingredient Showdown, in which the two chefs have one hour to prepare three dishes featuring a mystery ingredient. The dishes are evaluated by a panel of two judges, who can each award up to 20 points (10 for taste, five each for plating and originality). The chef with the lower total is eliminated, while the winner advances to the next episode.

During the next-to-last episode of the season, which features three chefs, the loser of the Chairman's Challenge is automatically eliminated and the remaining two chefs compete in the Secret Ingredient Showdown.

In the season finale, the last remaining chef competes in three Secret Ingredient Showdowns, one against each of the three Iron Chefs. If the chef's overall score is higher than the combined total of the three, he/she is awarded the title of Iron Chef. If the chef's overall score falls short, no new Iron Chef is named for the season.

== Season 1: 2017 ==
=== Contestants ===
- Nyesha Arrington (Los Angeles, California); Former Executive Chef/Owner, Leona
- Jason Dady (San Antonio, Texas); Executive Chef/Owner, Tre Trattoria
- Sarah Grueneberg (Chicago, Illinois); Executive Chef/Owner, Monteverde
- Michael Gulotta (New Orleans, Louisiana); Executive Chef/Owner, MOPHO
- Stephanie Izard (Chicago, Illinois); Executive Chef/Owner, Girl & the Goat; Izard lost to Iron Chef Michael Symon in Battle Bread on Iron Chef America.
- Shota Nakajima (Seattle, Washington); Executive Chef/Owner, Adana
- Jonathon Sawyer (Cleveland, Ohio); Executive Chef/Owner, The Greenhouse Tavern; Sawyer was Iron Chef Michael Symon's sous chef in his early battles, and later lost to Iron Chef Geoffrey Zakarian in Battle Mint.

=== Judges ===
- Episode 1: Geoffrey Zakarian and Donatella Arpaia Stewart
- Episode 2: Jose Garces and Anne Burrell
- Episode 3: Marc Forgione and Giada De Laurentiis
- Episode 4: Cat Cora and Ali Bouzari
- Episode 5: Alex Guarnaschelli and Ching He Huang
- Episode 6: Anya Fernald and Ludo Lefebvre

=== Contestant progress ===
Contestant	Episode										
Contestant	1		2		3		4		5		6
Izard	WIN	IN	IN	IN	IN	IN	SEL	WIN	WIN	WINNER	IRON CHEF
Grueneberg	LOW	WIN	WIN	IN	WIN	IN	IN	IN	IN	OUT	
Dady	IN	IN	IN	IN	IN	IN	WIN	IN	OUT		
Nakajima	IN	IN	LOW	WIN	SEL	WIN	LOW	OUT			
Gulotta	IN	IN	IN	IN	LOW	OUT					
Sawyer	IN	IN	SEL	OUT							
Arrington	SEL	OUT									

(IRON CHEF) The final chef survived the Gauntlet and became an Iron Chef.
(WINNER) This chef won the competition.
(IN) The chef was not selected as a top or bottom entry in the Chairman's Challenge or did not compete in the Secret Ingredient Showdown.
(LOW) The chef lost the Chairman's Challenge and must compete in the Secret Ingredient Showdown.
(SEL) The chef was selected to compete in the Secret Ingredient Showdown.
(WIN) The chef won the Chairman's Challenge or Secret Ingredient Showdown.
(OUT) The chef lost the Secret Ingredient Showdown and was eliminated.

=== Results ===
==== Episode 1: Into the Wild ====
- Chairman's Challenge: The chefs are given 30 minutes to prepare a dish using various wild game meats and earthy vegetables and mushrooms.

- WINNER: Stephanie Izard
- LOSER: Sarah Grueneberg
- CHOSEN TO CHALLENGE: Nyesha Arrington

- Secret Ingredient Showdown: Lobster is the secret ingredient.

- WINNER: Sarah Grueneberg
- ELIMINATED: Nyesha Arrington

- First aired: April 16, 2017

==== Episode 2: Nose to Tail ====
- Chairman's Challenge: The chefs draw cards to select a cut of a suckling pig and must prepare a dish with their cut.

- WINNER: Sarah Grueneberg
- LOSER: Shota Nakajima
- CHOSEN TO CHALLENGE: Jonathon Sawyer

- Secret Ingredient Showdown: Bananas and plantains are the secret ingredients.

- WINNER: Shota Nakajima
- ELIMINATED: Jonathon Sawyer

- First aired: April 23, 2017

==== Episode 3: Sweet and Savory ====
- Chairman's Challenge: The chefs are presented with a selection of sweet and savory items, but can only pick one item and must make both a sweet and a savory dish with it.

- WINNER: Sarah Grueneberg
- LOSER: Michael Gulotta
- CHOSEN TO CHALLENGE: Shota Nakajima

- Secret Ingredient Showdown: Octopus is the secret ingredient.

- WINNER: Shota Nakajima
- ELIMINATED: Michael Gulotta

- First aired: April 30, 2017

==== Episode 4: Classic Combos ====
- Chairman's Challenge: The chefs are assigned a classic combination of flavors and must construct a dish around them.

- WINNER: Jason Dady
- LOSER: Shota Nakajima
- CHOSEN TO CHALLENGE: Stephanie Izard

- Secret Ingredient Showdown: Chicken is the secret ingredient.

- WINNER: Stephanie Izard
- ELIMINATED: Shota Nakajima

- First aired: May 7, 2017

==== Episode 5: Five Ingredients ====
- Chairman's Challenge: The chefs are only allowed to use five ingredients to make their dish, but they may use as much of the ingredients as they choose. In addition, the chef who loses this challenge will be automatically eliminated.

- WINNER: Stephanie Izard
- ELIMINATED: Jason Dady

- Secret Ingredient Showdown: Eggs are the secret ingredient.

- WINNER: Stephanie Izard
- ELIMINATED: Sarah Grueneberg

- First aired: May 14, 2017

==== Episode 6: The Gauntlet ====
- Stephanie Izard must now compete against Iron Chefs Flay, Morimoto, and Symon in three separate Secret Ingredient Showdowns, in an order of her choosing.
- Secret Ingredient Showdown 1: Peppers are the secret ingredient, and Izard chooses to battle Flay.
- Secret Ingredient Showdown 2: Cheese is the secret ingredient, and Izard chooses to battle Symon.
- Secret Ingredient Showdown 3: Tilefish is the secret ingredient, and by process of elimination, Izard battles Morimoto.
- RESULTS: With a final total score of 90–87, Izard defeats the Iron Chefs and earns the title of Iron Chef.

- NEW IRON CHEF: Stephanie Izard

- First aired: May 21, 2017

== Season 2: 2018 ==
=== Contestants ===
- Timon Balloo (Miami, Florida); Executive Chef/Partner, SUGARCANE raw bar grill. Balloo lost to Iron Chef Guarnaschelli in Battle Bar Food on Iron Chef Showdown.
- Nicole Gomes (Calgary, Alberta); Executive Chef/Owner, Nicole Gourmet Catering.
- David LeFevre (Manhattan Beach, California); Executive Chef/Owner, Manhattan Beach Post.
- Dale MacKay (Saskatoon, Saskatchewan); Executive Chef/Owner, Grassroots.
- Jeanie Roland (Punta Gorda, Florida); Executive Chef/Owner, The Perfect Caper and Ella's Fine Food.
- Hong Thaimee (New York, New York); Executive Chef/Owner, Thaimee Box, Thaimee Table and Thaimee Magic. Thaimee lost to Iron Chef Flay in Battle Tamarind on Iron Chef America.
- Kevin Tien (Washington, D.C.); Executive Chef/Owner, Himitsu.

=== Judges ===
- Episode 1: Geoffrey Zakarian and Ching-He Huang
- Episode 2: Marc Forgione and Judy Joo
- Episode 3: Jose Garces and Anne Burrell
- Episode 4: Alex Guarnaschelli and Simon Majumdar
- Episode 5: Cat Cora and Rocco DiSpirito
- Episode 6: Donatella Arpaia, Marcus Samuelsson and Alton Brown^{1}

^Note 1 Alton Brown was added as a third judge only for the third battle of the Gauntlet

=== Contestant progress ===
Contestant	Episode										
Contestant	1		2		3		4		5		6
LeFevre	IN	IN	SEL	WIN	IN	IN	SEL	WIN	IN	WINNER	LOST
Gomes	IN	IN	IN	IN	WIN	IN	WIN	IN	IN	OUT	
Balloo	IN	IN	IN	IN	IN	IN	IN	IN	OUT		
Thaimee	IN	IN	WIN	IN	LOW	WIN	LOW	OUT			
Tien	SEL	WIN	IN	IN	SEL	OUT					
MacKay	WIN	IN	LOW	OUT							
Roland	LOW	OUT									

(LOST) This chef lost the Gauntlet and did not become an Iron Chef.
(WINNER) This chef won the competition.
(IN) The chef was not selected as a top or bottom entry in the Chairman's Challenge or did not compete in the Secret Ingredient Showdown.
(LOW) The chef lost the Chairman's Challenge and must compete in the Secret Ingredient Showdown.
(SEL) The chef was selected to compete in the Secret Ingredient Showdown.
(WIN) The chef won the Chairman's Challenge or Secret Ingredient Showdown.
(OUT) The chef lost the Secret Ingredient Showdown and was eliminated.

=== Results ===
==== Episode 1: Resourcefulness ====
- Chairman's Challenge: The chefs are given 45 minutes to prepare a dish using as many preparations and parts of the various proteins they obtain from the altar.

- WINNER: Dale MacKay
- LOSER: Jeanie Roland
- CHOSEN TO CHALLENGE: Kevin Tien

- Secret Ingredient Showdown: Spanish mackerel is the secret ingredient.

- WINNER: Kevin Tien
- ELIMINATED: Jeanie Roland

- First aired: April 4, 2018

==== Episode 2: Innovation ====
- Chairman's Challenge: The chefs must present an innovative sandwich in 30 minutes.

- WINNER: Hong Thaimee
- LOSER: Dale MacKay
- CHOSEN TO CHALLENGE: David LeFevre

- Secret Ingredient Showdown: Beets are the secret ingredient.

- WINNER: David LeFevre
- ELIMINATED: Dale MacKay

- First aired: April 11, 2018

==== Episode 3: Versatility ====
- Chairman's Challenge: The chefs are given 30 minutes to prepare dishes with ingredients based on their assigned regional cuisine.

- WINNER: Nicole Gomes
- LOSER: Hong Thaimee
- CHOSEN TO CHALLENGE: Kevin Tien

- Secret Ingredient Showdown: Wild boar is the secret ingredient.

- WINNER: Hong Thaimee
- ELIMINATED: Kevin Tien

- First aired: April 18, 2018

==== Episode 4: Ingenuity ====
- Chairman's Challenge: The final four chefs must prepare an inventive breakfast dish in 30 minutes.

- WINNER: Nicole Gomes
- LOSER: Hong Thaimee
- CHOSEN TO CHALLENGE: David LeFevre

- Secret Ingredient Showdown: Scallops are the secret ingredient.

- WINNER: David LeFevre
- ELIMINATED: Hong Thaimee

- First aired: April 25, 2018

==== Episode 5: Adaptabiliity ====
- Chairman's Challenge: Each chef selected two ingredients that are difficult to pair, then assigned them to another chef. The chef who loses this challenge will be automatically eliminated.

- WINNER: None
- ELIMINATED: Timon Balloo

- Secret Ingredient Showdown: Chops are the secret ingredient.

- WINNER: David LeFevre
- ELIMINATED: Nicole Gomes

- First aired: May 2, 2018

==== Episode 6: The Gauntlet Finale ====
- David LeFevre must now compete against Iron Chefs Izard, Symon, and Guarnaschelli in three separate Secret Ingredient Showdowns. In each round, LeFevre must decide between two ingredients, with significance to his opponent, to use as the secret ingredient they both must use. The chefs will only prepare one dish in each showdown.
- Secret Ingredient Showdown 1: Stephanie Izard

Goat and chocolate are the options, and LeFevre chooses goat.

- Secret Ingredient Showdown 2: Michael Symon

Bacon and sturgeon are the options, and LeFevre chooses sturgeon.

- Secret Ingredient Showdown 3: Alex Guarnaschelli

Eggplant and sea urchin are the options, and LeFevre chooses sea urchin. In addition, Alton Brown is added as a judge for this third battle.

- RESULTS: With a final total score of 115–113, the Iron Chefs emerge as the victors, and LeFevre fails to become an Iron Chef.
- First aired: May 9, 2018

== Companion shows ==
=== The Legend of Iron Chef ===
The series was preceded by the special episode "The Legend of Iron Chef", an overview of Iron Chef, Iron Chef America and The Next Iron Chef on Food Network, with Alton Brown reviewing key aspects and highlights from the shows. It also previewed Iron Chef Gauntlet and Alton Brown's new role in the new show.

=== Iron Chef Eats ===
A companion series, Iron Chef Eats, has been produced to go along with Iron Chef Gauntlet. In the show, various restaurants and foods are profiled which are places where Iron Chefs and Iron Chef competitors go to eat.
