= Iron Chef Showdown =

US television program

- Genre: Reality television; Cooking show
- Starring: Alton Brown; Mark Dacascos; Jaymee Sire; Bobby Flay; Jose Garces; Alex Guarnaschelli; Stephanie Izard; Michael Symon
- Country of origin: United States
- Original language: English
- No. of seasons: 1
- No. of episodes: 10

Production
- Production location: New York City
- Camera setup: Multi-camera
- Running time: 46 minutes

Original release
- Network: Food Network
- Release: November 8, 2017 – January 18, 2018

Related
- Iron Chef; Iron Chef America; The Next Iron Chef; Iron Chef Gauntlet; Iron Chef: Quest for an Iron Legend

Iron Chef Showdown is an American cooking show based on Fuji Television's Iron Chef, and is the fourth American adaptation of the series, following Iron Chef USA and Iron Chef America and Iron Chef Gauntlet. The show is produced by Food Network, which also carried a dubbed version of the original Iron Chef. Like the original Japanese program, the program is considered to be a culinary game show. In each episode, two new challenger chefs first compete against one another with the winner competing against one of the resident "Iron Chefs" in a one-hour cooking competition based on a secret ingredient or ingredients, and sometimes theme.

The show is presented as a re-imagined take on Iron Chef America. The Chairman is once again portrayed by actor and martial artist Mark Dacascos, who was introduced as the nephew of the original Japanese chairman Takeshi Kaga on Iron Chef America. The commentary is provided by Alton Brown who also serves as the host as well as a judge, and a new floor reporter Jaymee Sire is introduced.

The series premiered on Food Network on November 8, 2017 with a Thanksgiving-themed episode, with ten episodes aired in the first season. Iron Chefs Bobby Flay, Jose Garces, Alex Guarnaschelli, and Michael Symon return for this series; they are joined by the newest Iron Chef, Iron Chef Gauntlet winner Stephanie Izard. During taping of the first season, Bobby Flay removed his chef's coat to reveal a T-shirt which read "This is my last Iron Chef battle ever"; he later confirmed that he has officially quit the Iron Chef franchise.

== Format ==
Two challengers enter Kitchen Stadium and battle one another in a Chairman's Challenge based upon a secret ingredient. Alton Brown is the sole judge of this challenge and decides which of the two challengers advance to the next stage. The winner then faces an Iron Chef in a Secret Ingredient Showdown, in the traditional Iron Chef and Iron Chef America format. A panel of two guest judges decide the winner. Unlike the original Iron Chef America, the Chairman does not dine with the judges; host Alton Brown takes his place at the judging table, but does not vote on the winner. The two parts of the show, the Chairman's Challenge and the Secret Ingredient Showdown were introduced in Iron Chef Gauntlet.

== The Iron Chefs ==
=== Iron Chef statistics ===
The win/loss data is based solely on the performance of the participant as an Iron Chef in Iron Chef Showdown and does not include win–loss records on any previous programs including Iron Chef, Iron Chef America, The Next Iron Chef, or Iron Chef Gauntlet.

Iron Chef	Specialty	Win	Loss	Total	Win % (Note: Based on weighted average (.5 victory for a draw). The win/loss data is based on the performance of the Iron Chef in Iron Chef Showdown only.)
Bobby Flay (Note: Flay's record excludes his 43-16-2 record in Iron Chef America.)	Southwestern	1	1	2	.500
Jose Garces (Note: Garces' record excludes his 16-7 record in Iron Chef America.)	Latin Fusion	1	1	2	.500
Alexandra Guarnaschelli (Note: Guarnaschelli's record excludes her 4-3 record in Iron Chef America.)	Modern American	2	0	2	1.000
Stephanie Izard (Note: Izard's record excludes her participation in Iron Chef Gauntlet, including her defeat of Symon, Flay, and Masaharu Morimoto in the Gauntlet round, as she was not an Iron Chef at the time.)	Modern American	2	0	2	1.000
Michael Symon (Note: Symon's record excludes his 34-7-1 record in Iron Chef America.)	Mediterranean	2	0	2	1.000

== Episodes ==
#	Original airdate	Title	Chairman's challenge			Secret ingredient showdown			
#	Original airdate	Title	Challengers	Ingredient	Winner	Iron Chef	Ingredient/theme	Winner	Final score
1	November 8, 2017	"Big Thanksgiving Battle"	Lindsay Autry; Matt Kerney	Corn	Matt Kerney	Bobby Flay	Thanksgiving leftovers	Bobby Flay	49-44
2	November 15, 2017	"Battle Symon Says"	Hiroo Nagamura; David Schlosser	Mushrooms	David Schlosser	Michael Symon	Holstein beef	Michael Symon	48-37
3	November 22, 2017	"Battle Beantown"	Matt Jennings; Kristen Kish	Prosciutto	Kristen Kish	Jose Garces	Parmesan cheese	Jose Garces	47-41
4	November 29, 2017	"Battle Stuffed and Savory"	Marcellus Coleman; Leah Cohen	Squash	Leah Cohen	Stephanie Izard	Sausage	Stephanie Izard	42-36
5	December 6, 2017	"Italian Holiday Battle"	Ted Hopson; Kate Williams	Gingerbread	Ted Hopson	Alex Guarnaschelli	Feast of the Seven Fishes	Alex Guarnaschelli	44-37
6	December 13, 2017	"Battle Deep Sea Duel"	Brian Landry; Ryan McCaskey	Pork belly	Brian Landry	Stephanie Izard	Yellowfin tuna	Stephanie Izard	45-37
7	December 20, 2017	"Battle Meaty Matchup"	David Bancroft; Roxanne Spruance	Apple	David Bancroft	Jose Garces	Racks and ribs	David Bancroft	42-40
8	December 27, 2017	"Battle Bar Food"	Timon Balloo; Nicholas Elmi	Wings	Timon Balloo	Alex Guarnaschelli	Shrimp	Alex Guarnaschelli	35-30
9	January 3, 2018	"Battle Fruit and Fowl"	Gregory Gourdet; Brian Redzikowski	Grapes	Gregory Gourdet	Michael Symon	Duck	Michael Symon	41-35
10	January 10, 2018 (Note: This episode was originally scheduled for December 13, 2017. It was pulled from the schedule and re-edited to remove judge John Besh from the broadcast version; Giada De Laurentiis was the only judge on screen.)	"Battle Bobby Flay All Day"	Tory Miller; Jenner Tomaska	Potato	Tory Miller	Bobby Flay	Bison	Tory Miller	41-38

== Companion shows ==
=== Iron Chef: Outside the Stadium ===
Prior to the premiere episode of Showdown, Food Network aired a one-time special, Iron Chef: Outside the Stadium, which reviewed current status of former and current Iron Chefs Bobby Flay, Alex Guarnaschelli, Geoffrey Zakarian, Stephanie Izard, Michael Symon, Jose Garces and Wolfgang Puck.

=== Iron Chef: Behind the Battle ===
After each episode of Showdown, Food Network will air an episode of the companion series Iron Chef: Behind the Battle. In this series, Alton Brown will revisit past battles from Iron Chef America and provide his unique perspective and in-depth look at these battles.
