= Judy Joo =

American chef

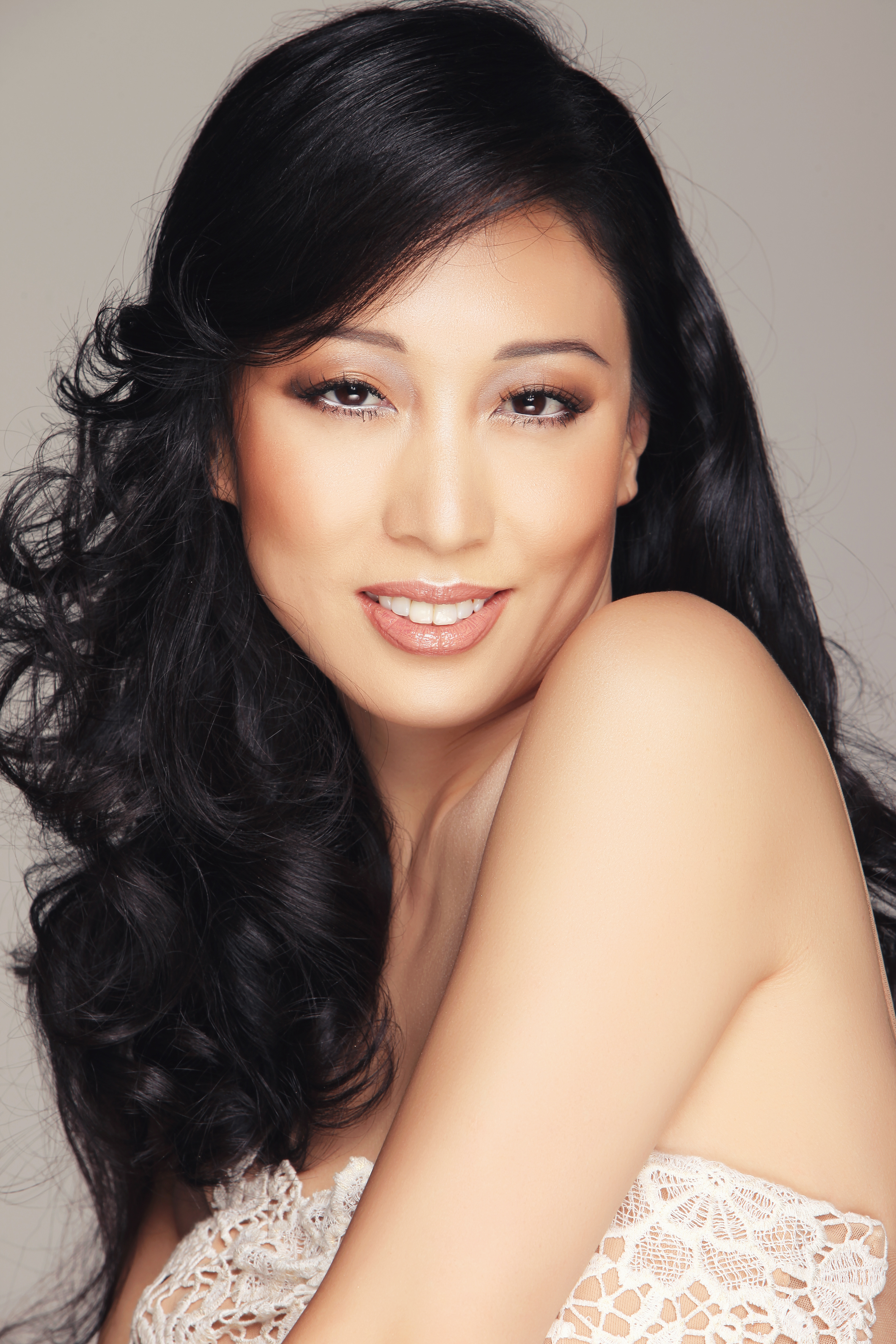
- Pictured in 2013
- Born: December 9, 1974 or 1975 (age 51–52); Summit, New Jersey, U.S.
- Education: Kent Place School, Summit, New Jersey, U.S.; Columbia University, School of Engineering and Applied Science; French Culinary Institute
- Culinary career
- Current restaurant
- Seoul Bird (2020–present)
- Previous restaurant
- Jinjuu (2015–2019)
- Television shows
- House of Knives; Cooking with the Stars; Korean Food Made Simple (host, chef); Kitchen Inferno (resident judge); Iron Chef UK (chef); Iron Chef America (judge, chef challenger); The Next Iron Chef (resident judge); Guy's Grocery Games (judge); The Best Thing I Ever Ate (chef); The Best Thing I Ever Made (chef)
- Awardss
- Official "Hansik" Food Ambassador, the Korean Food Foundation
- Website: judyjoo.com

Judy Joo (born December 9, 1974 or 1975) is an American chef, author, restaurateur, and television personality. She is best known as the host of Food Network's Korean Food Made Simple, and an Iron Chef UK and her restaurant Seoul Bird in London, Edinburgh, Las Vegas, and New York.

== Early life and education ==
Judy Joo was born in Summit, New Jersey, to first-generation Korean immigrants. Her father, Eui Don Joo, was born in Chŏngju, which became part of North Korea after the division of the Korean Peninsula. As a child, he fled south with his parents and eight siblings amid the establishment of a communist regime in the North. He later graduated from medical school in Seoul and immigrated to the United States in 1967, where he worked as a psychiatrist. Her mother, Young Nim Park, from Icheon, South Korea, moved to the U.S. in 1968 on a scholarship for a master’s degree in chemistry at Ohio State University. The couple met in Grand Rapids, Michigan before settling in New Jersey, where Park later became a real estate broker.

Joo has described her childhood as a "typical tiger mom upbringing". Raised in Berkeley Heights, New Jersey, she attended the private all-girls Kent Place School alongside her older sister, where they were the only Asian students.

She graduated from Columbia University’s School of Engineering and Applied Science in 1997 with a degree in industrial engineering and operations research. Joo has since served on the school's Board of Visitors and was the commencement speaker for the Class of 2018.

== Career ==
She began a career in the banking industry with an internship at Goldman Sachs, followed by a role at Morgan Stanley as an institutional fixed income derivatives saleswoman.

In 2004, Joo began her culinary career after completing a six-month pastry arts program at the French Culinary Institute in New York. She later worked as an editorial assistant in the test kitchen at Saveur magazine. As part of the Slow Food USA movement, Joo established a monthly workshop teaching nutrition, ingredients, and cooking at the Children's Storefront elementary school in Harlem, where she was a volunteer tutor.

A move to London led Joo to restaurants, where she experienced work at Gordon Ramsay's restaurants, including Maze, Pétrus, Restaurant Gordon Ramsay, Gordon Ramsay at Claridge's and the Boxwood Café. She has also completed "stages" at The French Laundry, Nahm (Bangkok), and The Fat Duck.

=== Playboy Club ===
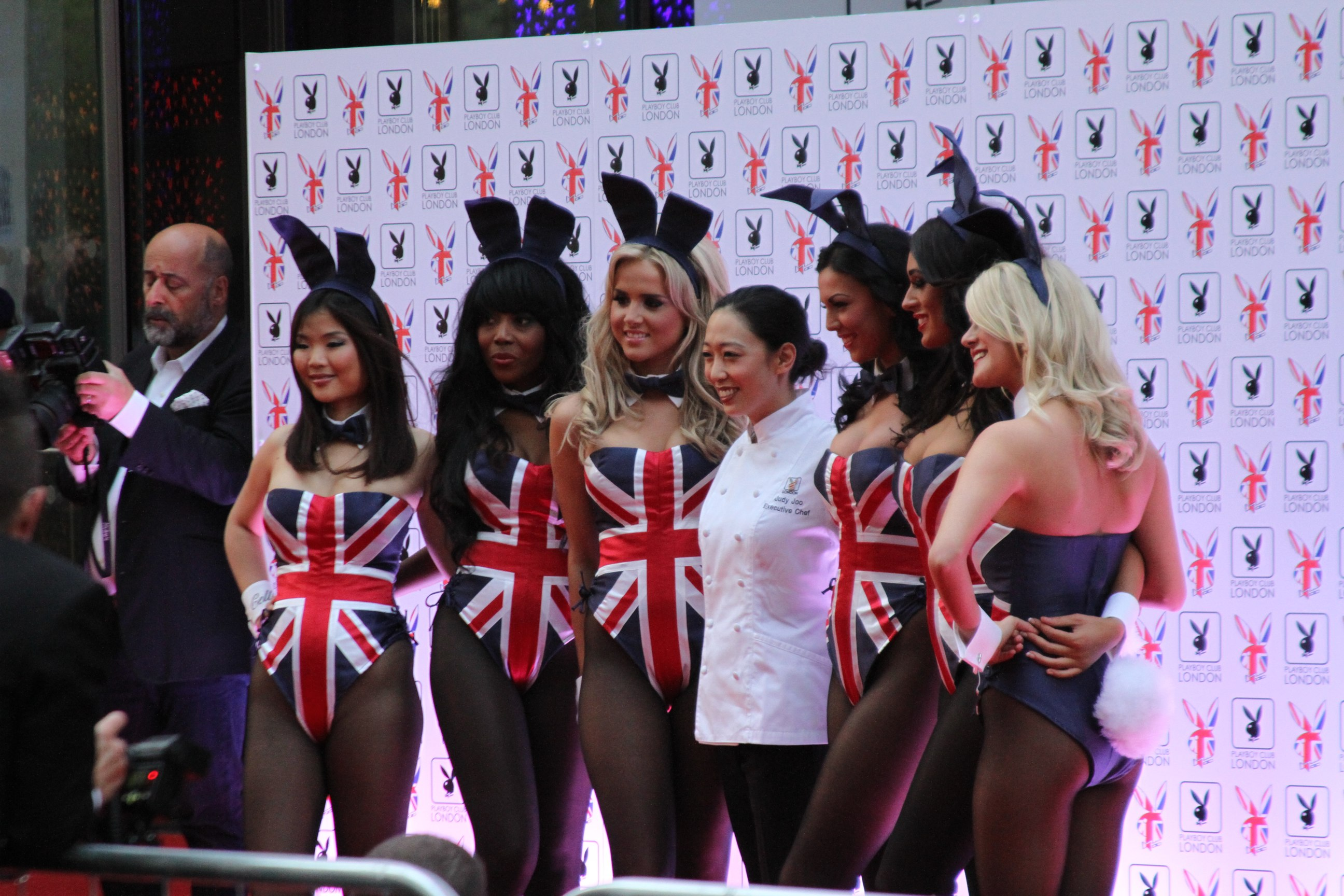
Joo at the opening of the Playboy Club London, in 2011

In 2011, at age 36, Joo was hired as executive chef at the newly reopened Playboy Club in London’s Mayfair. She was approached for the role by Caesars Entertainment after being spotted on a television cooking show. Joo said her menu was designed to reflect Playboy’s American origins, featuring steak and burgers, which she described as "big boy food." Korean-influenced starters were also offered, including japchae and kimchi tacos with bulgogi. During her time at the club, she cooked for high-profile guests, including Justin Bieber and Kate Moss.

=== Jinjuu ===
After enjoying her food at the Playboy Club, businessman Kia Joorabchian approached Joo in 2014 with an offer to open her own restaurant in Soho, London. The project was funded by Joorabchian and Ali Jassim, an adviser to Sheikh Mansour bin Zayed al Nahyan of the United Arab Emirates.

Jinjuu opened on Kingly Street in early 2015 to a mixed reception. A.A. Gill of The Times said it "teeters on the edge of being a nice restaurant," describing the Korean fried chicken as having a "thick, brown duvet crust that was like pebbledash breakfast cereal, apparently more for insulation than flavour." However, Richard Vines of Bloomberg praised the dish, as well as the "excellent" bibimbap, "authentic" japchae, and "well-judged" mandu. Jay Rayner of The Observer concluded that the restaurant was "mediocre" and the food "serviceable, if expensive." He also stated, "It seems to me that this merely proves “authentic” really is not the same as “good”."

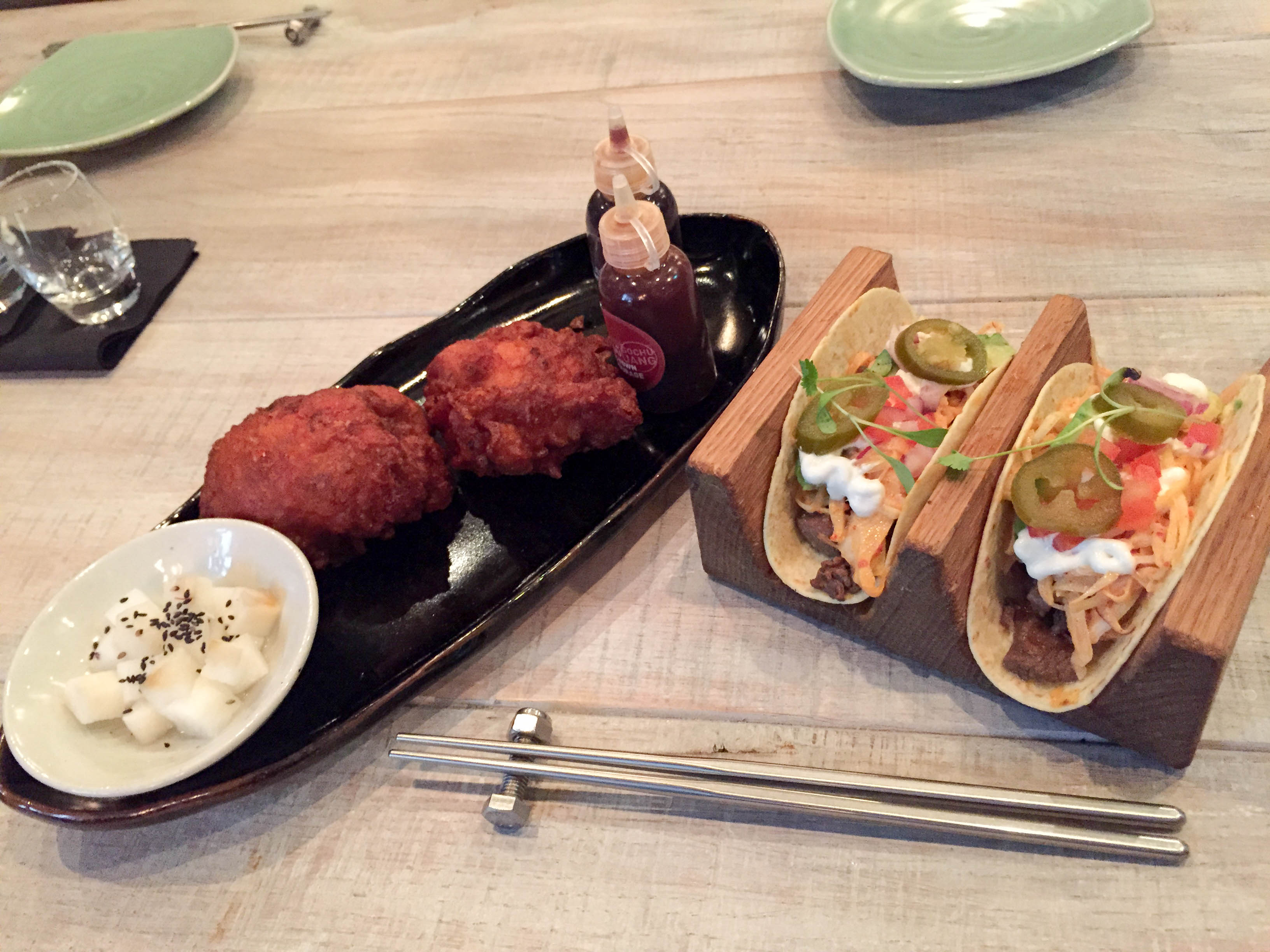
Chicken and tacos as served at Jinjuu

In a review for the Evening Standard, Fay Maschler echoed Gill’s assessment of the chicken, describing it as having a "plaster-cast coating," and also criticized "rampant" upselling. She also noted that Jinjuu's japchae was missing citrus and fish sauce, ingredients common in Southeast Asian dishes like Pad Thai but not typical of japchae. Following a complaint from Joo citing cultural and culinary ignorance, the review was removed from the newspaper's website. In a later interview, Joo said that British critics had conflated her Korean cooking with Thai cuisine, describing this as "an ignorance of the cultural differences within Asia."

Jinjuu was awarded with "Plate" status in the 2015, 2016, 2017, and 2018 Michelin Guide, and was awarded for its design at the Restaurant and Bar Design Awards.

Later in 2015, businessman Bruce Rockowitz invested in the opening of a Jinjuu restaurant in Hong Kong, following a recommendation from his daughter, who had dined at the London location. The 120-seat restaurant in Lan Kwai Fong was also backed by singer Coco Lee (Rockowitz’s wife) and Hong Kong business magnate Allan Zeman. Joo lived in Hong Kong for three months prior to the opening.

Joo opened a third site in 2016 on Albemarle Street in Mayfair, again in partnership with Joorabchian. Following the closure of the Hong Kong and Mayfair restaurants, Joo left the business in 2019. The original Soho restaurant closed in 2023.

=== Seoul Bird ===
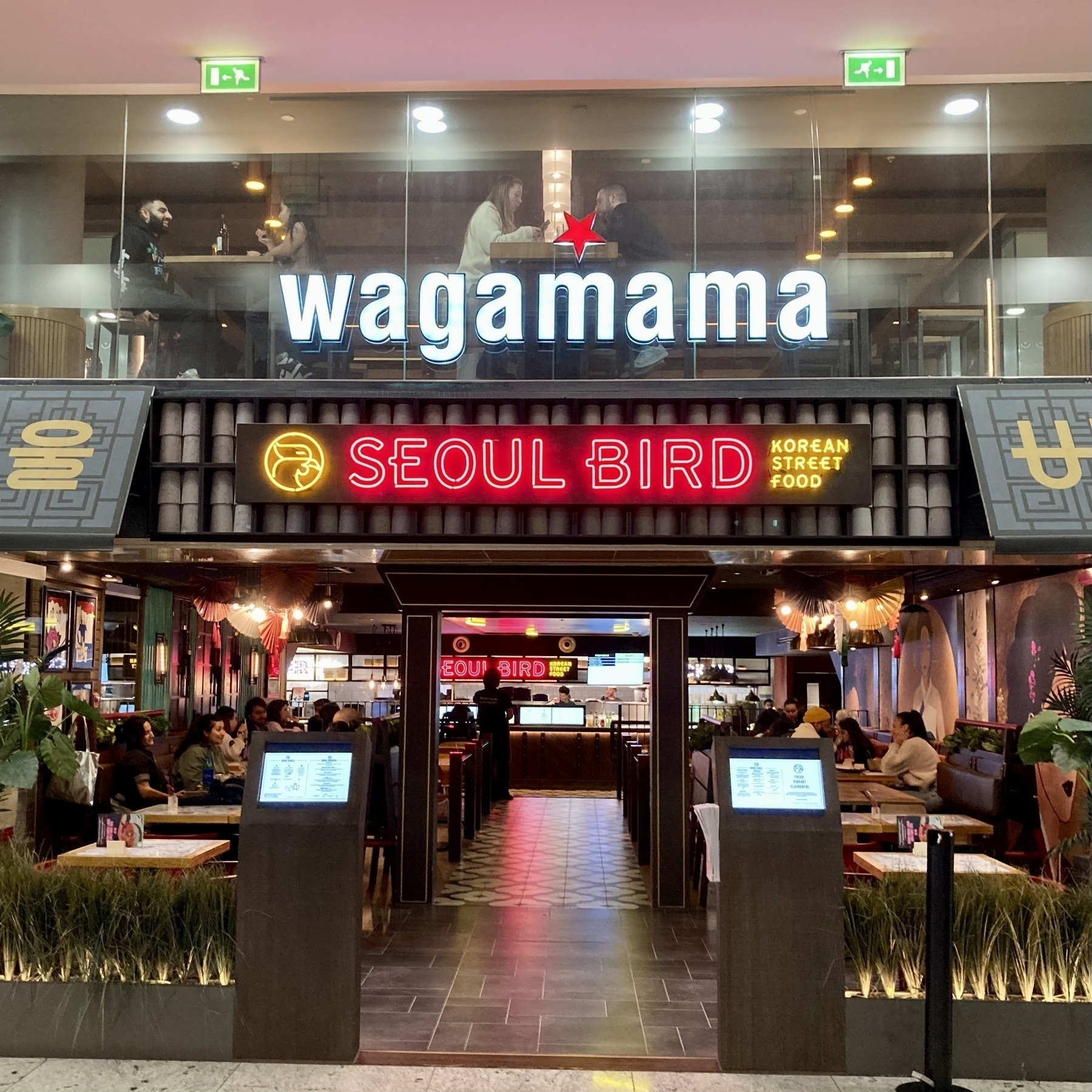
A branch of Seoul Bird

In 2020, Joo opened a fast casual concept, Seoul Bird, in the Westfield shopping mall, Shepherd's Bush, London. A second location was opened in 2021 in Canary Wharf and then Seoul Bird opened in the Aria Resort and Casino, Las Vegas in 2022. Seoul Bird opened in the Barclays Center in Brooklyn, New York in 2023. In 2024 and 2025, Joo opened in Citi Field, Edinburgh Airport, Tottenham Hotspur F.C., and Madison Square Garden.

In 2021, Joo taught Mark Flanagan, royal chef to Queen Elizabeth II, how to make kimchi at an event organized by the Embassy of South Korea in London. In 2023, Joo served British-Korean fusion canapés at 10 Downing Street during a state visit by South Korean President Yoon Suk Yeol, hosted by Prime Minister Rishi Sunak.

== Television ==
Following a chance encounter with a television producer at a party in 2008, Joo began to appear as a regular guest on cookery show Market Kitchen. She was later cast for the 2010 launch of Iron Chef UK on Channel 4, alongside Sanjay Dwivedi and Michelin-starred chefs Martin Blunos and Tom Aikens. The game show saw four contestants, each cooking one course, competing against an expert "iron chef" who must prepare four courses in the same amount of time. Despite the franchise's success in the US and Japan, the British version failed to attract an audience and was pulled from the schedules mid-season.

However, the exposure led to further opportunities. Since 2011, Joo has served as a judge on Food Network competition shows in the United States, including The Next Iron Chef, Iron Chef America, Iron Chef Gauntlet, Kitchen Inferno, Beat Bobby Flay, Guy's Grocery Games, Bobby's Triple Threat, Worst Cooks in America and House of Knives. She also competed as a global Iron Chef challenger on Iron Chef America against Alex Guarnaschelli.

In 2012, Joo hosted the documentary Judy Joo's Homecoming: Invitation to South Jeolla Cuisine (Korean: 주디 주의 귀향 - 남도음식으로의 초대) for Korean channel MBC, where she learned from masters of kimchi, octopus fishing and soy sauce. Following this, she hosted two seasons of Korean Food Made Simple, which was broadcast in the United States on the Cooking Channel, on MBC in South Korea and in 13 further countries on Food Network. Joo said she had been pitching the show for over four years before it was eventually funded by the Korea Food Foundation, a government agency.

In 2021 and 2022, Joo appeared on the ITV cooking competition Cooking with the Stars, serving as a mentor to musician Naughty Boy and comedian Joe Wilkinson. In 2023, Joo appeared as a guest judge on Top Chef: World All-Stars on Bravo. She has also appeared on shows including Today, Good Morning America, Sunday Brunch, Saturday Kitchen, The Wendy Williams Show and James Martin's Saturday Morning.

== Books ==
- Korean Food Made Simple, 2016 (ISBN 9781910254721)
- Judy Joo's Korean Soul Food, 2019 (ISBN 9780711251670)
- K-Quick: Korean Food in 30 Minutes or Less, 2025 (ISBN 9780711297586)

In addition to her cookbooks, Joo has also written for magazines and periodicals including the Financial Times, the Guardian, Forbes Travel Guide and National Geographic.

== See also ==
- Korean Americans in New York City
- List of Columbia University alumni and attendees
