= Jaymee Sire =

Sports commentator

- Education: Washington State University
- Occupation: TV Host

Jaymee Sire is an American television host and sports commentator who previously worked for ESPN. She is currently the host of "Food Network Obsessed," podcast which debuted in January 2021, and was nominated for the Webby Awards in 2022. She is best known for her work on SportsCenter:AM at ESPN, the morning installment of the network's flagship show, which aired live Monday-Friday from 7am-10am ET. She also served floor reporter for Iron Chef Showdown, which aired in the 4th quarter of 2017 on Food Network. Sire also runs her own food blog, "e is for eat".

== Career ==
After graduating from Washington State University, Sire worked at KRTV in her hometown for one year before moving to KFMB in San Diego in 2003. In 2008, she took a job with CSN Bay Area, where she worked until 2013, primarily covering the Golden State Warriors and San Francisco Giants.

Sire left CSN Bay Area in early 2013 to take a job with ESPN, where she helped launch Sports Center :AM, the network's early morning installment of Sports Center. She also served as the sideline reporter for the Little League World Series. She was one of about 100 employees to be laid off at ESPN in April 2017.

Following her layoff from ESPN, Sire made the pivot towards food television. She has appeared as a guest co-host 6 times on Beat Bobby Flay, and as a judge on Season 13 of Food Network Star on Food Network. On July 25, 2017, it was announced that she would be the new floor reporter for Iron Chef Showdown, which aired in 4th quarter of 2017 on Food Network. In 2019, she began hosting live classes on the Food Network Kitchen app. In December 2020, Food Network announced that Sire would be the host of the network's first ever podcast, Food Network Obsessed.

== Awards ==
While at KFMB in San Diego, Sire received the Pacific Southwest Emmy Award for Best Sports Story in 2007, as well as an RTNA Southern California Golden Mic Award in 2004 for Best Feature Reporting. In 2013, she was awarded a San Francisco/Northern California Emmy Award for her work on All A's: A's in Japan.
