= Roberto Treviño =

American chef

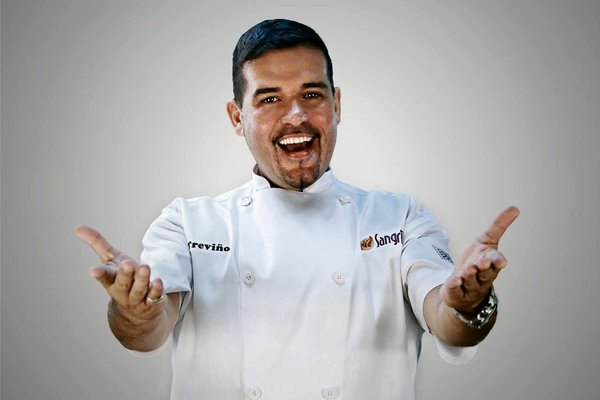
- Chef Roberto Treviño in 2015
- Born: Sunnyvale, California United States
- Culinary career
- Cooking style: Nuevo Latino, Fusion, Latin-Asian, Criollo Boricua
- Current restaurants
- Budatai, Casa Lola, Dragon Fly, Rosa Mexicana, Bar Gitano, Bar Gitano, El Buddha, Pizza La Pasta, La bodeguita de candela, all located in San Juan, Puerto Rico
- Television shows
- Iron Chef America; The Next Iron Chef; Kandela; 4 Minutos con Chef Treviño
- Website: www.patreon.com/Chefrobertotrevino

Roberto Treviño is an American chef known for his appearances on Iron Chef: America and The Next Iron Chef. He is chef and owner of three restaurants and a bar in the Condado area of San Juan, Puerto Rico.

== Career ==
Treviño moved to Puerto Rico in the early 1990s to work as a chef for the inauguration of the El Conquistador Resort in Fajardo, Puerto Rico. In 1996 he quit his job at El Conquistador to open The Parrot Club, a Nuevo Latino restaurant in Old San Juan, where he served as Executive Chef. Following the success of The Parrot Club, Treviño opened two more restaurants in Old San Juan: Dragonfly (2000), specializing in Latin-Asian Cuisine, and Aguaviva (2002), a seafood restaurant.

In 2007, Treviño stepped down as Executive Chef of the three restaurants in Old San Juan and opened the 5,000 square foot Latin-Asian Budatai in Condado as Chef / Owner. He has since opened three more locales of his own in Condado: Bar Gitano which features Spanish tapas and paellas, local watering hole El Barril, and his latest, the 16,000 square foot "criollo kitchen" Casa Lola. His fifth restaurant in Puerto Rico, Rosa Mexicano, a collaboration with NYC restaurateur Howard Greenstone, is set to open in early 2013.

Treviño has cooked dinner at the James Beard Foundation house in New York, & Orlando for their award events, is frequently featured as a guest chef in food events throughout the US and the Caribbean, including the Aspen Food & Wine Classic, Telluride Culinary Festival and the St Croix Food and Wine Festival, and has served as guest chef on Celebrity Cruise Lines ships on several occasions.

He has made numerous television appearances both in Puerto Rico and the US, including a battle against renowned Chef Mario Batali on Iron Chef: America, as a contestant on The Next Iron Chef, with Rachael Ray on her show $40 a Day, as well as on his own local shows Kandela and the currently running 4 Minutos con Chef Treviño on WIPR-TV.

In late 2011 Treviño launched CookShop, a production company specializing in television production and live events. Up to date CookShop has produced Treviño's series 4 Minutos con Chef Treviño and presented the Food & Fashion Festival, a once a year event which was attended by more than 3,000 guests on its inaugural date.

In 2026 , Chef Treviño is back with a new venue "La Tropical" located in Puerta de Tierra, San Juan, Puerto Rico.
