= Jeanie Roland =

American chef and restaurateur

- Born: 1966 (age 59–60); Waterbury, Connecticut
- Website: chefjeanieroland.com

Jeanie Roland (born c.1966), is an American chef and restaurateur.

== Early life and education ==
Jeanie Kachergis was born to Alfred Kachergis, a Marine, and grew up in a Lithuanian neighborhood in Waterbury, Connecticut, developing an early interest in cooking. She swam competitively starting at age 3.

She started working in the restaurant industry at age 14, washing dishes. She received a bachelor's degree in exercise science from Southern Connecticut State University, where she was a competitive swimmer, and in 1992 graduated from the Culinary Institute of America in Hyde Park, New York.

== Career ==
Roland's first professional position was at a private club in California, where she was verbally abused by her boss, whom she had considered a mentor but who made misogynistic comments to and about her in front of coworkers. She and her husband then worked together as private chefs for a corporation.

Roland became unemployed after a downsizing resulting from the September 11th terrorist attacks. She and her husband moved to Florida and opened The Perfect Caper in Punta Gorda in 2001. In 2012, she opened Ella's Food & Drink in Westerly, Rhode Island.

Roland has written two cookbooks, Butter, Love & Cream (2018) and The Perfect Caper Home Cooking (2022) Salon said of The Perfect Caper that "with the same relaxed elegance she brings to her restaurants...Roland imbues her writing with approachable warmth".

She defeated Bobby Flay in an episode of Beat Bobby Flay and competed on Iron Chef Gauntlet, Season 2. In 2020 she gave a private cooking lesson for Taylor Swift, a Westerly resident.

== Personal life ==
Roland is married to James Roland, a fellow chef; the two met in California. They are co-owners of the restaurants.

== Recognition ==
Roland has been nominated seven times by the James Beard foundation as a semifinalist for Best Chef-South region. CBS Boston said, "Restaurants simply don't get much better than Ella's Food and Drink in Westerly, Rhode Island."
