= Jehangir Mehta =

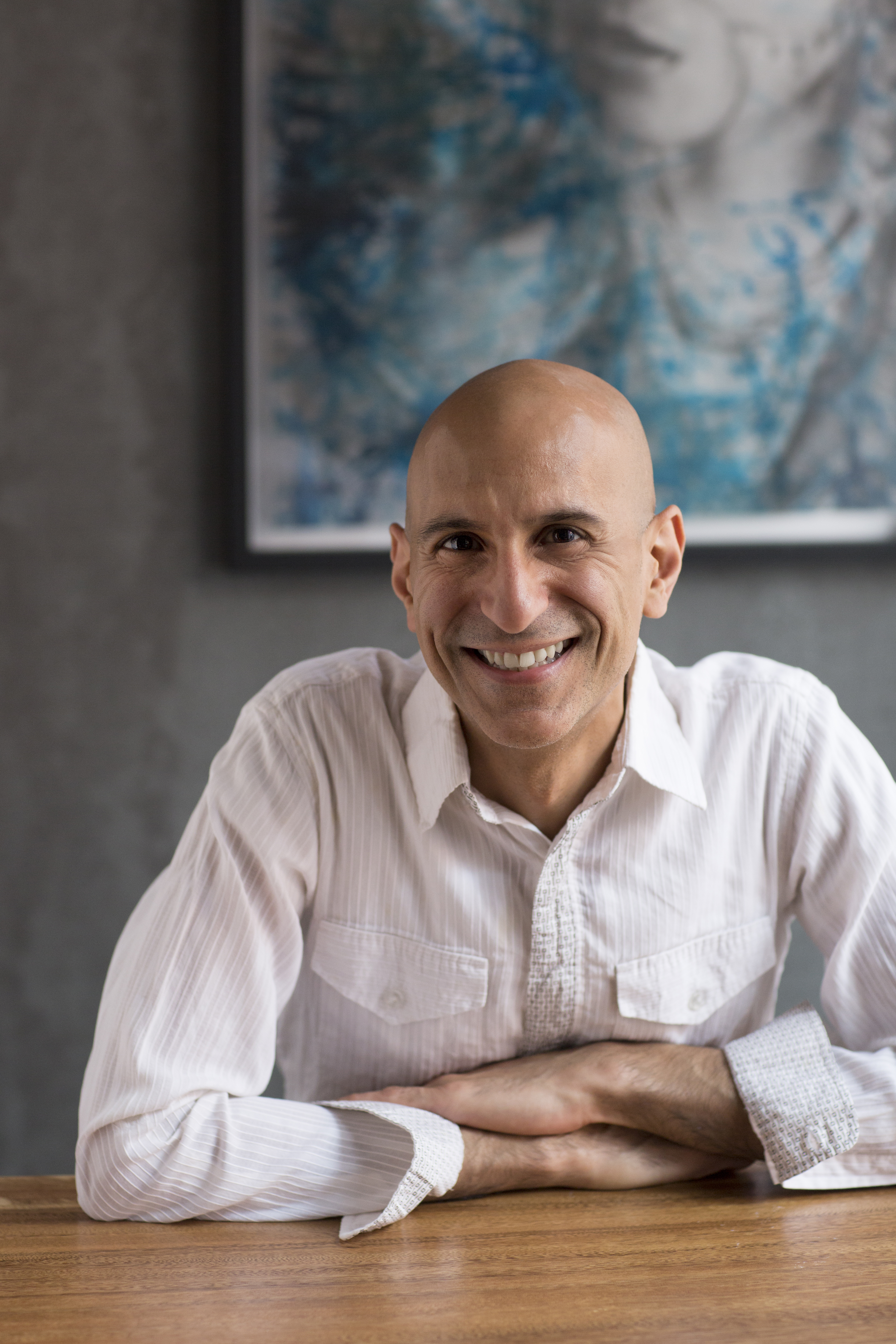
- Born: Mumbai
- Education: Culinary Institute of America
- Spouse: Hinata Jambuserwala Mehta
- Culinary career
- Current restaurant(s): Graffiti Mehtaphor Me and You
- Television show: Iron Chef America and Next Iron Chef

Jehangir Mehta (born in Mumbai, India) was the executive chef and owner of New York City restaurants Graffiti, Mehtaphor and Graffiti Earth. He is the chef and owner of the private dining experience, Me and You. He is also the author of the 2008 HarperCollins cookbook "Mantra: The Rules of Indulgence," offers a cooking class at his restaurant for children 4-14 called "Candy Camp" designed to build interest in more diverse foods, hosts exclusive in-home dinner parties and runs an event planning company.

In August 2009, Jehangir appeared on "Iron Chef America" on Food Network, and was the runner-up on the second season of "The Next Iron Chef" later in 2009.

== Personal life ==
Jehangir Mehta was born to Petras and Kolly Mehta in Mumbai, India where he was raised. He is Zoroastrian. After moving to the United States, he met and married his wife, Hinata Jambuserwala. They currently live in New York City.

== Professional life ==
Jehangir holds a bachelor of arts in sociology from the University of Mumbai. Jehangir then moved to the United States to attend The Culinary Institute of America in Hyde Park, New York and graduated from there in 1995.

After graduating from culinary school in 1995, Jehangir began his career at L'Absinthe in New York City. From there, he moved on to Typhoon Brewery where he worked as the pastry chef to James Chew, formerly of Vong fame.

Jehangir's next move was to Jean Georges. In 1998, Jean Georges Vongerichten selected him to open his new restaurant, Mercer Kitchen, quickly to become one of the hottest destinations in New York City.

In 1999 he moved on to work with Rocco DiSpirito at Union Pacific, and in 2001 joined Didier Virot, who had left Jean Georges to open the highly acclaimed although short-lived restaurant Virot. Jehangir's next move was to Compass, where he became known for unorthodox but creative and intellectually driven desserts.

In 2002, Jehangir teamed up with Didier Virot as the pastry chef at Aix, located on the Upper West Side of Manhattan, where he received acclaimed reviews for his pastry creations, while also consulting with Patricia Lo at Sapa and Michael Symon at Parea.

In 2007 Jehangir opened his first restaurant, Graffiti, where he is currently the executive chef and owner. Started consulting with Umass Amherst on food sustainability.

In 2008, he authored his first cookbook, "Mantra: The Rules of Indulgence" which was published by HarperCollins.

In 2010 Jehangir opened his second restaurant, Mehtaphor, in TriBeCa within the Duane Street Hotel. This restaurant transformed to Graffiti Earth in 2016.

In 2013, Jehangir partnered with the non-profit patient advocacy organization Beyond Celiac (then known as the National Foundation for Celiac Awareness) as a chef ambassador to help launch their Gluten-Free Chef's Table Tour. The aim of the program was to educate chefs about the gluten-free diet and the needs of customers with celiac disease.

In 2016, Graffiti Earth opened in the same spot as Mehtaphor. A renovation and rebranding, Graffiti Earth has the same cuisine as the original Graffiti with a more vegetable-forward menu and a focus on sustainability. At Graffiti Earth, Chef Mehta works with underutilized vegetables, produce and seafood.

In 2017, Chef Mehta opened Me and You, a private dining boutique concept experience. This concept also travels to different venues in cities and countries.

In 2018, Chef Mehta started his consultancy in mindfulness, culture, and impact with Gourmet Dining, Compass USA.

== Television and media coverage ==
=== Food Network ===
- In August 2009, Jehangir appeared on Iron Chef America, where he lost to Iron Chef Masaharu Morimoto in Battle Coconut by only 2 points.
- Beginning on 4 October 2009, Jehangir was a contestant on the new season of the reality show The Next Iron Chef. Jehangir finished second, losing in the final episode, telecast on 22 November, to Jose Garces.
- In 2012, Mehta competed in the 5th season of The Next Iron Chef. He was eliminated in the 6th episode.

=== Other television appearances ===
- In January 2009 Jehangir and Graffiti were featured on the Martha Stewart Show.
- In September 2009, Graffiti's beet ice cream was featured on The Dr. Oz Show as a food for preventing kidney stones.
- Jehangir, and his restaurant Graffiti, have been featured on ABC, Fox News, NBC, Martha Stewart, and NY1 LXTV.
- In December 2011, Jehangir featured on the show MasterChef India (season 2).

=== Media coverage ===
Jehangir has been featured in numerous publications in the United States, including Gourmet, Bon Appétit, Vogue, The New York Times, New York, Time Out, Gotham, Daily News, New York Post. He has also been written up on various blogs including DailyCandy, Strong Buzz, Restaurant News, and Grubb Street.

== Books ==
In 2008, Jehangir published his first cookbook:

- Mantra: The Rules of Indulgence (HarperCollins, 20 May 2008) - ISBN 978-0-06-089985-1

== Web show ==
Mehta debuted his do-it-yourself cooking web show, J Walk, in November 2009.

== Awards ==
- Timeout: Best Pastry Chef run restaurant in 2008
