= America's Best Cook =

2014 American television series

America's Best Cook was a limited run American cooking show which premiered on Food Network and Food Network Canada, April 14, 2014. It is hosted by Food Network host Ted Allen. It consisted of one six episode season.

The winner of the competition was Stephanie Goldfarb, a 29 year-old home cook from Chicago Illinois, was chosen by Bobby Flay.

== The competition ==
The competition began with 16 chefs, four from each region of the north, south, east, and west. They were each mentored by a mentor from their region. Michael Symon mentored the north, Cat Cora helped the south, Tyler Florence mentored the west, and Alexandra Guarnaschelli helped out the east. After week 1, 8 chefs were eliminated and after that they went one by one until the final four reached the finale. In each week, they had special challenges which were served by a guest judge. If the judge liked it, they were safe, if not, they moved on to the pressure cooker, where they cooked something else, and the bottom chef was eliminated. Each week (except for the finale) judges had 10 minutes to mentor the chefs and could use a SOS button once during the round to help their chefs. If both chefs from one mentor were eliminated, then the mentor was also eliminated. The winning chef, won 50 000 dollars as well the title of "America's Best Cook." These are all home cooks who are competing.
