= Jeffrey Steingarten =

Food writer and former lawyer

Jeffrey L. Steingarten
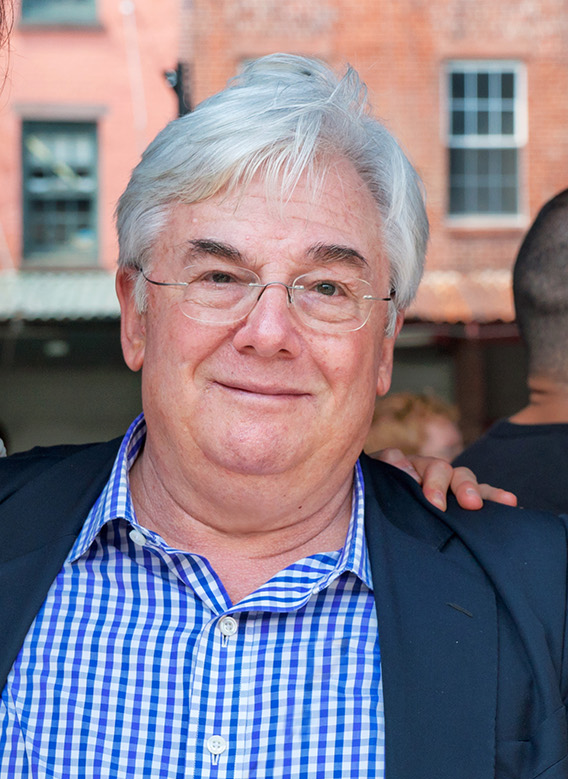
- Steingarten in 2011
- Born: May 31, 1942 (age 84)
- Education: Harvard University in 1965, and Harvard Law School in 1968
- Occupation: Food writer
- Parent: Henry Steingarten (father)
- Awards: Chevalier in the Order of Merit by the Republic of France; Julia Child Cookbook Award Winner.

Jeffrey L. Steingarten (born May 31, 1942) is a leading food writer in the United States. He has been the food critic at Vogue magazine since 1989.

== Career ==
His 1997 book of humorous food essays, titled The Man Who Ate Everything, was awarded the 1998 Borders Award for literary food writing from the International Association of Culinary Professionals. The book has been translated into Chinese, Japanese, Korean, Dutch, German, Portuguese and Czech. The New York Times Book Review said of his book: "A wonderful book…brilliant…a triumph. Part cookbook, part travelogue, part medical and scientific treatise. Steingarten writes with marvelous ease, clarity, and humor." Hendrick Hertzberg of the New Yorker observes that his writing is "so well prepared, so expertly seasoned, and so full of flavorsome surprises... that if it were a meal even Mr. Steingarten himself would have difficulty finding fault in it."

In 2002, Steingarten published a second collection of essays, which he titled It Must've Been Something I Ate: The Return Of The Man Who Ate Everything. Both books are published by Knopf and Vintage. Steingarten's pieces have also appeared in The New York Times, Men's Vogue, and Slate Magazine. Working with Ed Levine, he was co-host of the show New York Eats, which aired in 1998–2000 on a local Metro channel. Steingarten frequently serves as a judge on the Food Network program Iron Chef America, and he has also been a judge on the second season of "The Next Iron Chef." On the Iron Chef shows, Steingarten tends to be the most critical and technically specific of the three judges.

His father was attorney Henry Steingarten, who represented, among his many clients, the rock and roll pioneer Jimi Hendrix. Jeffrey Steingarten graduated from Harvard University in 1965, where he was an officer of the Harvard Lampoon Magazine, and Harvard Law School, where he was a member of the Harvard Legal Aid Bureau, in 1968. He worked as assistant to Boston mayor Kevin White with future Congressional Representative Barney Frank. Steingarten departed from his legal career in 1989, joining Vogue magazine as a food critic.

On Bastille Day, 1994, in recognition of his writings on French gastronomy, Steingarten was made a Chevalier in the Order of Merit by the Republic of France. His monthly columns in Vogue have earned him a National Magazine Award, and nearly a dozen James Beard Awards and nominations. William Rice of the Chicago Tribune named Steingarten "our most original and investigative food writer," and he has been hailed by The Wall Street Journal as "one of gastronomy's first citizens."

== Bibliography ==
- Collected in: American Food Writing: An Anthology with Classic Recipes, ed. Molly O'Neill (Library of America, 2007) ISBN 1-59853-005-4
- Collected in: Penguin Book of Food and Drink, ed. Paul Levy (Viking, 1996) ISBN 0-670-85266-X
- The Man Who Ate Everything, (Vintage, 1996) ISBN 0-375-70202-4
- It Must've Been Something I Ate, (Knopf, 2002) ISBN 0-375-41280-8
