= The Next Iron Chef =

American cooking competition show

- Genre: Reality television Cooking show
- Starring: Alton Brown; Mark Dacascos
- Judges: Michael Ruhlman; Andrew Knowlton; Donatella Arpaia; Jeffrey Steingarten; Anya Fernald; Michael Symon; Simon Majumdar; Judy Joo; Geoffrey Zakarian
- Composer: Craig Marks
- Country of origin: United States
- Original language: English
- No. of seasons: 5
- No. of episodes: 38

Production
- Production locations: New York City; Munich; Paris; Los Angeles; Tokyo; Las Vegas
- Running time: 60–90 minutes

Original release
- Network: Food Network
- Release: October 7, 2007 – December 23, 2012

Related
- Iron Chef; Iron Chef America; Iron Chef Gauntlet; Iron Chef Showdown

The Next Iron Chef is a limited-run series on the Food Network that aired its fifth season in 2012. Each season is a stand-alone competition to select a chef to be designated an Iron Chef, who will appear on the Food Network program Iron Chef America.

In Season 1, eight chefs from around the United States battled to be the next Iron Chef. The show debuted Sunday, October 7, 2007, and the hosts were Alton Brown and "The Chairman", Mark Dacascos. Challenges one through five of the competition were held at the Culinary Institute of America. Challenges six and seven took place in Munich and Paris, respectively. The final challenge took place at the Food Network studios in New York City, on the Iron Chef America set. The winner of The Next Iron Chef was Cleveland restaurant chef Michael Symon.

Season 2 premiered on October 4, 2009, and featured ten chefs battling to be the newest Iron Chef. The show was based in Los Angeles before traveling to Tokyo for two episodes, and again hosted by Alton Brown and "The Chairman" Mark Dacascos. Following a final battle in Kitchen Stadium, Chicago-born Ecuadorian-American chef Jose Garces, was selected the newest Iron Chef. Garces debuted as an Iron Chef on January 17, 2010, when he squared off against Seattle chefs Rachel Yang and Seif Chirchi.

Food Network began airing commercials for the third season of The Next Iron Chef in July 2010. It was later announced in an internet press release that Alton Brown and judge Donatella Arpaia would return for season 3. Completing the judges panel are food writer and broadcaster Simon Majumdar and current Iron Chef Michael Symon. Season 3 began airing on October 3, 2010, on Food Network. The winner of season 3 was Marc Forgione. Chef Forgione engaged in his first battle against Washington D.C. chef RJ Cooper on November 28, 2010. By November 30, 2010, Next Iron Chef's music composer Craig Marks released the soundtrack "Iron Chef America & The Next Iron Chef", which contains themes from all seasons of both shows.

During Season 4, the eliminated chefs were interviewed during the week following the episode airdate on ABC's The Chew. The first castoff was interviewed on November 1, 2011.

Season 5 aired from November 4, 2012, to December 23, 2012, and was called The Next Iron Chef: Redemption. The winner was Alexandra Guarnaschelli, who had her first battle against Iron Chef UK’s Judy Joo on December 30, 2012.

In 2017, the series was succeeded by Iron Chef Gauntlet.

== Judges ==
Judges	Seasons				
Judges	1	2	3	4	5
Donatella Arpaia	♦	♦	♦		♦
Michael Ruhlman	♦				
Andrew Knowlton	♦				
Jeffrey Steingarten		♦			
Anya Fernald		♦			
Simon Majumdar			♦	♦	♦
Michael Symon			♦	♦	
Judy Joo				♦	
Geoffrey Zakarian					♦

== Season 1: 2007 ==
=== Contestants ===
- John Besh (New Orleans, LA); defeated Mario Batali in Battle Andouille in Season 3 of Iron Chef America.
- Chris Cosentino (San Francisco, CA); lost to Batali in Battle Garlic, in Season 4.
- Jill Davie (Santa Monica, CA) Chef de Cuisine at Josie in Santa Monica, California, and co-host of Fine Living's Shopping with Chefs.
- Traci Des Jardins (San Francisco, CA); defeated Batali in Battle Shrimp in Season 2.
- Gavin Kaysen (San Diego, CA) Chef de Cuisine at El Bizcocho at the Rancho Bernardo Inn in California.
- Morou Ouattara (Washington, D.C.) who lost to Bobby Flay in Battle Peas in Season 3.
- Aarón Sanchez (New York, NY) who tied Masaharu Morimoto in Battle Black Bass in Season 2.
- Michael Symon (Cleveland, OH) who lost to Masaharu Morimoto in Battle Asparagus in Season 2.

Besh specialised in French/Cajun cuisine, Cosentino in Nose-To-Tail Rustic Italian, Davie in Seasonal Produce, Des Jardins in French-California, Kaysen in Seasonal French, Morou in French/African/Middle-Eastern fusion, Sanchez in Latin, and Symon in Mediterranean/American.

=== Judges ===
The contest was judged by food writer Michael Ruhlman, Bon Appétit restaurant editor Andrew Knowlton, and restaurateur Donatella Arpaia.

=== Contestant progress ===
Episode	1		2		3	4	5	6	Comments
Challenge	1	2	3	4	5	6	7	8	
Symon	IN	IN	WIN	IN	WIN	WIN	IN	WIN	The Next Iron Chef
Besh	IN	WIN	IN	IN	IN	IN	IN	OUT	Elimin: Attain Greatness
Cosentino	IN	IN	IN	WIN	IN	IN	OUT		Elimin: Lead and Inspire
Sanchez	WIN	IN	IN	IN	IN	OUT			Elimin: Pressure
Morou	IN	IN	IN	IN	OUT				Elimin: Resourcefulness
Kaysen	IN	IN	IN	IN	OUT				Elimin: Resourcefulness
Davie	IN	IN	IN	OUT					Elimin: Innovation
Des Jardins	IN	OUT							Elimin: Artistry

(WIN) The chef won the series
(WIN) The chef won the challenge.
(OUT) The chef lost that week's Elimination Challenge and was out of the competition.

=== Results ===
==== Episode 1 ====
- Challenge 1: Speed

- A speed challenge in which chefs are required to debone a chicken, fillet a salmon, open enough coconuts to produce two cups of coconut milk, shuck six oysters and clams, french a rack of lamb, and slice off a 4-inch (100 mm) strip of daikon thin enough to read newsprint through within 15 minutes.
- WINNER: Aarón Sanchez

- Challenge 2: Artistry

- Chefs are challenged to make desserts: one with any available ingredient and the second featuring savory ingredients. Each chef selects one of the following savory ingredients: catfish, tripe, beef shoulder, chorizo, duck confit, bacon, salmon roe, or squid based on the order of their finish in the Speed challenge. The chefs are not allowed to use butter, sugar, or cheese unless they make it themselves.
- WINNER: John Besh
- ELIMINATED: Traci Des Jardins

- First aired: October 7, 2007

==== Episode 2 ====
- Challenge 3: Simplicity

- The chefs have 30 minutes to prepare six one-bite (amuse-bouche) dishes that best exemplify their style of cooking. Because of his win in the Artistry challenge in Episode 1, Chef Besh is given the advantage of selecting his ingredients first, and also selecting the order in which the chefs present their dishes. The chefs serve as judges for each other's dishes. Chef Sanchez misunderstands the rules and fails to finish plating more than a single serving of his dish, deciding during the judging to give his dish to Chef Besh for tasting.
- WINNER: Michael Symon

- Challenge 4: Innovation

- After a brief introduction to the special ingredients and appliances (and with some tutelage by chef Wylie Dufresne in a special guest appearance), the chefs have 90 minutes to "play" with these items in order to incorporate them into their cooking style. The chefs then have 90 minutes to prepare a dish using innovative ingredients (e.g., xanthan gum, liquid nitrogen) and innovative appliances (e.g., thermal immersion circulator, Anti-griddle) to prepare a single dish for the judges. With his win in Challenge 1 of this round, Chef Symon is able to select his ingredients first and had a dedicated set of cooking equipment, while the other contestants have to share a common set.
- WINNER: Chris Cosentino
- ELIMINATED: Jill Davie

- First aired: October 14, 2007

==== Episode 3 ====
- Challenge 5: Resourcefulness (Double Elimination)

- The chefs are divided into pairs. Each chef selects ingredients for his partner and places the ingredients in a sealed cooler. The chefs are taken outdoors, where each chef has 60 minutes to prepare two dishes with the items located in his cooler and the limited ingredients at his individual station. In addition, the chefs are only able to use a single charcoal grill to cook their dishes. With his win in the previous challenge, Chris Cosentino is given the privilege of deciding the pairings of contestants.
- WINNER: Michael Symon
- ELIMINATED: Gavin Kaysen and Morou Ouattara

- First aired: October 21, 2007

==== Episode 4 ====
- Challenge 6: Creativity Under Pressure

- The remaining four chefs learn that they will be traveling to Germany for this week's challenge. At the Munich airport, the chefs are taken to Lufthansa's catering facilities where their next challenge is to create the ultimate first class meal for passengers, to be finished and presented to the first class cabin of a long-haul jet. They have 90 minutes to prepare a minimum of three dishes.
- WINNER: Michael Symon
- ELIMINATED: Aarón Sanchez

- First aired: October 28, 2007

==== Episode 5 ====
- Challenge 7: Lead and Inspire

- The remaining three chefs continue the overseas portion of the competition as they fly to Paris for the next challenge. The chefs must create a meal representing their interpretations of classic American foods, to be served at a dinner hosted by the United States Ambassador to France, with guests including a number of noted French culinary figures.
- WINNER: No winner was chosen.
- ELIMINATED: Chris Cosentino

- First aired: November 4, 2007

==== Episode 6 ====
- Challenge 8: Attain Greatness

- The final competition takes the form of a head-to-head competition in Kitchen Stadium in a traditional Iron Chef America battle. The secret ingredient was swordfish. Judges Ruhlman, Knowlton and Arpaia are replaced in the on-air tasting portion of the judging by current Iron Chefs Bobby Flay, Cat Cora and Masaharu Morimoto. The three judges and the three Iron Chefs collaborate to determine the winner, each receiving a ballot to vote for their preferred candidate.
- WINNER: Michael Symon
- ELIMINATED: John Besh

- First aired: November 11, 2007

== Season 2: 2009 ==
=== Contestants ===
- Nate Appleman (Executive Chef and partner, Pulino's Bar and Pizzeria, New York City); lost to Michael Symon in Battle Suckling Pig in Season 7
- Dominique Crenn (Chef de Cuisine, Luce at The Intercontinental Hotel, San Francisco)
- Brad Farmerie (Executive Chef, Double Crown, Madam Geneva, PUBLIC, The Monday Room, New York City); defeated Cat Cora in Battle Maple Syrup in Season 7
- Amanda Freitag (Executive Chef, The Harrison, New York City); lost to Bobby Flay in Battle Alaskan King Crab in Season 7
- Jose Garces (Executive Chef and owner, Amada, Tinto, Distrito, Chifa, Village Whiskey, Garces Trading Company, JG Domestic, Philadelphia; Mercat a la Planxa, Chicago); defeated Bobby Flay in Battle Melon in Season 6
- Eric Greenspan (Executive Chef and owner, The Foundry on Melrose, Los Angeles)
- Jehangir Mehta (Executive Chef and owner, Graffiti, New York City); lost to Masaharu Morimoto in Battle Coconut in Season 7
- Seamus Mullen (Executive Chef and partner, Boqueria Flatiron and Boqueria Soho, New York City)
- Holly Smith (Chef and owner, Cafe Juanita, Poco Carretto Gelato, Kirkland, WA)
- Roberto Treviño (Executive Chef and owner, Budatai, San Juan, Puerto Rico); lost to Mario Batali in Battle Catfish in Season 1

=== Judges ===
The judges are restaurateur Donatella Arpaia, food author and long-time Iron Chef America judge Jeffrey Steingarten and sustainable food expert Anya Fernald.

=== Contestant progress ===
Episode	1		2		3		4	5		6		7	8	Comments
Challenge	1	2	3	4	5	6	7	8	9	10	11	12	13	
Garces	WIN	IN	IN	IN	IN	IN	IN	IN	WIN	IN	WIN	IN	WIN	The Next Iron Chef
Mehta	IN	IN	WIN	IN	IN	IN	WIN	IN	IN	WIN	IN	IN	OUT	Elim: Imagination
Mullen	IN	IN	IN	WIN	IN	WIN	IN	IN	IN	IN	IN	OUT		Elim: Integrity
Freitag	IN	IN	IN	IN	WIN	IN	IN	IN	IN	IN	OUT			Elim: Umami
Appleman	IN	WIN	IN	IN	WIN	IN	IN	WIN	OUT					Elim: Pressure
Treviño	IN	IN	IN	IN	WIN	IN	IN	IN	OUT					Elim: Pressure
Crenn	IN	IN	IN	IN	WIN	IN	OUT							Elim: Adaptability
Farmerie	IN	IN	IN	IN	IN	OUT								Elim: Innovation
Smith	IN	IN	IN	OUT										Elim: Interpretation
Greenspan	IN	OUT												Elim: Fearlessness

(WIN) The chef won the series
(WIN) The chef won the challenge.
(OUT) The chef lost that week's Elimination Challenge and was out of the competition.

=== Results ===
==== Episode 1 ====
- Challenge 1: Memory

- The Chairman presents each chef with an ingredient associated with their past, and challenges them to make a dish, to be presented family-style, that represents who they are.
- WINNER: Jose Garces

- Challenge 2: Fearlessness

- The Chairman assigns each chef an exotic ingredient he or she may not have used before. Exercising his advantage, Chef Garces was allowed to exchange the ingredients of two chefs: Chef Crenn and Chef Mullen.
- WINNER: Nate Appleman (Unlaid Eggs)
- ELIMINATED: Eric Greenspan (Grasshoppers)

- First aired: October 4, 2009

==== Episode 2 ====
- Challenge 3: Simplicity

- In this challenge, the Chairman gives each chef the choice of one traditional cooking vessel from one of a variety of countries; each is designed for a one-pot style of cooking. After 45 minutes of cook time, the contestants must taste and judge their fellow competitors' dishes.
- WINNER: Jehangir Mehta

- Challenge 4: Interpretation

- In the next challenge, Alton Brown assigns each chef a specific traditional dish from one of three countries: Greece, France and Italy. Each chef is given one hour to create their own interpretation of the dish they were assigned.
- WINNER: Seamus Mullen

- ELIMINATED: Holly Smith

- First aired: October 11, 2009

==== Episode 3 ====
- Challenge 5: Innovation, Part I

- In this challenge, the chefs are sent in pairs to various restaurants in the Los Angeles area where they must taste the restaurant's signature dish, and then are tasked to duplicate the dish from scratch in 10 minutes. The owners of the restaurant determine which of the two competitors' dishes are closest to the original. The winner is allotted an additional 5 minutes in the next challenge.
- Assignments:
  - Vietnamese: Beef Pho (Chefs Crenn and Garces)
  - Korean: Dolsot-bibimbap (Chefs Appleman and Mullen)
  - Thai: Green Curry with Fish Balls (Chefs Freitag and Mehta)
  - Chinese: Pork and Vegetarian Dumplings (Chefs Treviño and Farmerie)
- WINNERS: Appleman, Crenn, Frietag and Treviño

- Challenge 6: Innovation, Part II

- The chefs must use inspiration from their visit to local restaurants to reinterpret a traditional American dish.
- WINNER: Seamus Mullen

- ELIMINATED: Brad Farmerie

- First aired: October 18, 2009

==== Episode 4 ====
- Challenge 7: Adaptability

- The Chairman presents the chefs with a challenge to test their ability to adapt: prepare two Mexican-inspired dishes, one sweet and one savory, using a surprise ingredient: tamarind imported from Mexico. Each chef has 90 minutes total to shop at Los Angeles's Grand Central Market and to cook their dishes. Late in the cooking period, host Alton Brown added a twist, when he conveyed the Chairman's wish to have a drink featuring tamarind added to the meal.
- WINNER: Jehangir Mehta

- ELIMINATED: Dominique Crenn

- First aired: October 25, 2009

==== Episode 5 ====
- Challenge 8: Pressure, Part I

- Indian chef Suvir Saran tests how well the remaining contenders perform under pressure. The chefs are to make a one-bite vegetarian representation of the taste of India. As winner of the previous challenge, Chef Mehta has first choice of ingredients.
- WINNER: Nate Appleman

- Challenge 9: Pressure, Part II

- The chefs are to make a 5 course Indian dinner. This is a double-elimination challenge. As winner of the previous challenge, Chef Appleman has first choice of the protein ingredients and takes all of the red snapper.
- WINNER: Jose Garces
- ELIMINATED: Roberto Treviño and Nate Appleman
- The remaining 4 chefs receive plane tickets to travel to Tokyo where the next episode takes place.

- First aired: November 1, 2009

==== Episode 6 ====
- Challenge 10: Umami (Deliciousness), Part I: Yakitori

- The chefs must create five yakitori, each with umami.
- Guest Judge: Iron Chef Masaharu Morimoto
- WINNER: Jehangir Mehta

- Challenge 11: Umami (Deliciousness), Part II: Five Flavors of Rice

- The chefs must create five dishes featuring five flavors: sweet, sour, salty, bitter and umami. Each dish must feature rice in some fashion, and be served in a traditional Japanese Bentō box.
- Guest Judge: Dr. Yukio Hattori, Director of the Hattori Nutrition College. Dr. Hattori was a commentator on the original Japanese Iron Chef.
- WINNER: Jose Garces
- ELIMINATED: Amanda Freitag

- First aired: November 8, 2009

==== Episode 7 ====
- Challenge 12: Integrity

- Personal expression through a multi-course seafood meal.
- Guest Judges: The Chairman, Dr. Yukio Hattori
- FINALISTS: Jose Garces, Jehangir Mehta
- ELIMINATED: Seamus Mullen

- First aired: November 15, 2009

==== Episode 8 ====
- Challenge 13: Imagination

- The final challenge was a traditional head-to-head Iron Chef battle, themed around the Imagination of Mehta and Garces, as told through the melting pot of American cuisine. The secret ingredient was ribs and racks, and featured beef, pork and buffalo meat.
- Guest Judges: The Chairman, Masaharu Morimoto, Bobby Flay, Michael Symon
- WINNER: Jose Garces
- ELIMINATED: Jehangir Mehta

- First aired: November 22, 2009

== Season 3: 2010 ==
=== Contestants ===
- Marco Canora (chef and owner of Hearth, Terroir and Terroir TriBeca in New York City)
- Bryan Caswell (chef and owner of Reef, Stella Sola and Little Bigs in Houston, Texas)
- Maneet Chauhan (chef at Vermillion in Chicago, Illinois and New York), lost to Masaharu Morimoto in Battle Leeks in Season 8
- Mary Dumont (Executive Chef at Harvest in Cambridge, Massachusetts), lost to Cat Cora in Battle Milk and Cream in Season 5
- Duskie Estes (chef and owner of Zazu Restaurant and Farm, Bovolo and Black Pig Meat Company in Sonoma County, California)
- Marc Forgione (chef and owner of Marc Forgione in New York), sous chef for Laurent Tourondel, who defeated Bobby Flay in Battle Goat Cheese in Season 3
- Andrew Kirschner (Executive chef at Wilshire in Santa Monica, California), sous chef for Govind Armstrong, who lost to Bobby Flay in Battle Squash in season 1.
- Mario Pagán (chef and owner of Mario Pagán Rest., MĀRO, and La Central in Puerto Rico / Chayote Barrio Kitchen in Winter Park)
- Celina Tio (chef and owner of Julian in Kansas City, Missouri)
- Ming Tsai (chef and owner of Blue Ginger in Wellesley, Massachusetts), defeated Bobby Flay in Battle Duck in Season 1

=== Judges ===
The judges are restaurateur Donatella Arpaia, food writer and broadcaster Simon Majumdar and current Iron Chef Michael Symon, winner of the Season 1 competition.

=== Contestant progress ===
Episode	1		2		3		4		5		6		7		8	Comments
Challenge	1	2	3	4	5	6	7	8	9	10	11	12	13	14	15	
Forgione	IN	IN	IN	WIN	WIN	IN	IN	IN	IN	IN	IN	IN	IN	IN	WIN	The Next Iron Chef
Canora	IN	IN	IN	IN	IN	WIN	IN	IN	WIN	IN	IN	WIN	WIN	WIN	OUT	Elim: Honor
Tsai	IN	WIN	IN	IN	IN	IN	IN	IN	IN	WIN	WIN	IN	IN	OUT		Elim: Seduction
Tio	IN	IN	IN	IN	IN	IN	WIN	WIN	IN	IN	IN	IN	IN	OUT		Elim: Seduction
Caswell	IN	IN	IN	IN	IN	IN	IN	IN	IN	IN	IN	OUT				Elim: Inspiration
Chauhan	IN	IN	WIN	IN	IN	IN	IN	IN	IN	OUT						Elim: Respect
Estes	WIN	IN	IN	IN	IN	IN	IN	OUT								Elim: Transformation
Dumont	IN	IN	IN	IN	IN	OUT										Elim: Resourcefulness
Pagán	IN	IN	IN	OUT												Elim: Innovation
Kirschner	IN	OUT														Elim: Ingenuity

(WIN) The chef won the series.
(WIN) The chef won the challenge.
(OUT) The chef lost that week's Elimination Challenge and was out of the competition.

=== Results ===
==== Episode 1: Ingenuity ====
- Secret Ingredient Challenge (Secret Ingredient: Bread): Each chef must make a sandwich expressing his or her culinary style

- WINNER: Duskie Estes

- Chairman's Challenge: Cook a dish on the beach, using tropical ingredients. Their dish must feature the one food they would want to have on a deserted island.

As the winner of the Secret Ingredient Challenge, Chef Estes was able to have a five-minute advantage to grab ingredients from the "pantry" and start cooking.

- WINNER: Ming Tsai
- ELIMINATED: Andrew Kirschner

- First aired: October 3, 2010

==== Episode 2: Innovation ====
- Secret Ingredient Challenge (Secret Ingredients: Coffee and Donuts): Create a breakfast transforming these two ingredients.

- WINNER: Maneet Chauhan
- DISADVANTAGE: Mary Dumont

- Chairman's Challenge: Roadside diner classics

As the winner of the previous challenge, Maneet Chauhan was able to assign the dishes to prepare to each chef. Mary Dumont, having come in last, received a one-minute penalty assessed at the beginning.

- WINNER: Marc Forgione
- ELIMINATED: Mario Pagán

- First aired: October 10, 2010

==== Episode 3: Resourcefulness ====
- Secret Ingredient Challenge (Secret Ingredient: Pickles): Create a "portable snack" expressing the ingredient's versatility.

- WINNER: Marc Forgione
- DISADVANTAGE: Duskie Estes

- Chairman's Challenge: Create two dishes that revolve around the fishes the chefs caught. Chefs who were short on fish were also allowed to use sardines as a focus ingredient too.

As the winner of the previous challenge, Marc Forgione was able to replace one of his caught fishes with someone else. He replaced one of his scorpion fishes with Celina Tio's caught snapper as a result. Duskie Estes, having come in last, received a one-minute penalty assessed at the beginning.

- WINNER: Marco Canora
- ELIMINATED: Mary Dumont

- First aired: October 17, 2010

==== Episode 4: Transformation ====
- Secret Ingredient Challenge (Secret Ingredients: Condiments): Each chef is assigned to transform a selected condiment, such as mayonnaise, ketchup, or ranch dressing, into a dish featuring the condiment.

- WINNER: Celina Tio
- DISADVANTAGE: Maneet Chauhan

- Chairman's Challenge: At the San Diego County Fair, each chef must transform ingredients found at the fair's concession stands into three dishes: one fried, one on a stick, and one grilled. All dishes must be prepared on a large outdoor grill.

As the winner of the previous challenge, Celina Tio had a five-minute head start in the 30-minute hunt for ingredients on the fair grounds. Maneet Chauhan, having come in last, received a one-minute penalty assessed at the beginning of cooking.

- WINNER: Celina Tio
- ELIMINATED: Duskie Estes

- First aired: October 24, 2010

==== Episode 5: Respect ====
- Secret Ingredient Challenge (Secret Ingredient: Potatoes)

- WINNER: Marco Canora
- DISADVANTAGE: Marc Forgione

- Chairman's Challenge: Each chef was challenged to cook four dishes; one each representing the northern, southern, eastern and western regions of the United States.

- WINNER: Ming Tsai
- ELIMINATED: Maneet Chauhan

- First aired: October 31, 2010

Note: In this episode, Iron Chef Jose Garces served as a guest judge, substituting for fellow Iron Chef Michael Symon.

==== Episode 6: Inspiration ====
Note: Following Chauhan’s elimination, Caswell, Tio, Tsai, Canora, and Forgione are flown from “The Kitchen” in southern California, to Las Vegas, Nevada for episodes 6 and 7.

- Secret Ingredient Challenge (Secret Ingredient: Chocolate): The chefs were given two hours to create a dessert display. Caswell, Tsai, and Canora produce Croquembouches, Forgione plates a brittle-themed serving, and Tio instead presents a plated dessert.

- WINNER: Ming Tsai

- Chairman's Challenge: Each chef was tasked with creating his or her own buffet display and was given 3 hours to create three hot and two cold entrees. As winner of the previous challenge, Ming Tsai was given a one-minute head start on selecting his ingredients.

- WINNER: Marco Canora
- ELIMINATED: Bryan Caswell

(This episode was originally intended to be a double elimination. However, because there was a three-way tie for the second chef to be eliminated, the remaining four chefs were all allowed to continue to the next round.)

- First aired: November 7, 2010

==== Episode 7: Seduction ====
- Secret Ingredient Challenge (Secret Ingredient: Liquor): Create a cocktail using the secret ingredient, paired with a suitable bar food snack to associate with the drink. Bartender Charlotte Voisey serves as a guest judge, alongside the remaining four chefs who judge each other’s dishes. Marco Canora and Celina Tio receives tied votes, but, according to Alton Brown, the visiting guest judge’s vote breaks a tie, and Voisey’s vote for Canora declares him the winner.

- WINNER: Marco Canora

- Chairman's Challenge: Seduce the judges by creating three luxurious dishes featuring one luxury protein. Each chef selected one of four safes containing an unknown quality ingredient in turn, before collecting additional ingredients from four fine dining restaurants in 30 minutes. Celina Tio selected first, receiving Hawaiian Moi, and Marc Forgione selected second, being given Lobster. Marco Canora had the advantage to trade his unopened safe for another chef's ingredient, along with selecting at which restaurant each chef will begin gathering ingredients. Canora traded his unopened safe for Tsai's ingredient: Wagyū beef. Tsai instead received the ingredient from the unopened safe: Mangalitsa Pork. Canora chose the Japanese restaurant for himself, Italian for Tio, American for Tsai, and Spanish for Forgione.

- WINNER: Marco Canora
- FINALIST: Marc Forgione
- ELIMINATED: Celina Tio and Ming Tsai

- First aired: November 14, 2010

==== Episode 8: Honor ====
Secret Ingredient: Thanksgiving Feast (heritage turkey, white pekin duck, venison, lobster) For the challenge, Iron Chefs Bobby Flay and Masaharu Morimoto are added to the judging panel.

- WINNER: Marc Forgione
- ELIMINATED: Marco Canora

- First aired: November 21, 2010

== Season 4: 2011: Super Chefs ==
=== Contestants ===
- Anne Burrell (Host of Secrets of a Restaurant Chef and Worst Cooks in America, also sous-chef for Mario Batali on Iron Chef America); while being partnered with Michael Symon both defeated Cat Cora and Robert Irvine in Battle Deep Freeze in Season 9
- Michael Chiarello (Owner of Bottega Restaurant, Napa Valley; host of Easy Entertaining with Michael Chiarello)
- Elizabeth Falkner (Owner of Citizen Cake and Orson, San Francisco); lost to Cat Cora in Battle Honey in Season 3. Also has appeared on Food Network Challenge
- Alex Guarnaschelli (Chef and Owner, Butter and The Darby, New York; Host, Alex’s Day Off, Judge, Chopped); lost to Cat Cora in Battle Farmers' Market in Season 5
- Chuck Hughes (Chef and Owner, Garde Manger, Montreal; Host, Chuck’s Day Off Cooking Channel); defeated Bobby Flay in Battle Canadian Lobster in Season 9
- Robert Irvine (Chef and Owner, Robert Irvine's eat!, Hilton Head Island; Host, Dinner: Impossible, Restaurant: Impossible, Worst Cooks in America); has lost twice while being partnered on special holiday episodes of Iron Chef America
- Beau MacMillan (Executive Chef, Sanctuary on Camelback Mountain, Phoenix; Host, Worst Cooks in America); defeated Bobby Flay in Battle American Kobe Beef in Season 3
- Spike Mendelsohn (Chef and Owner, Good Stuff Eatery, Washington D.C.; Host, Kelsey & Spike Cook [Food2.com]; contestant on Top Chef (season 4)); lost to Michael Symon in Battle Prosciutto in Season 8
- Marcus Samuelsson (Chef and Owner, Red Rooster Harlem, New York; Judge, 24 Hour Restaurant Battle, Chopped, Next Food Network Star); lost to Bobby Flay in Battle Corn in Season 6
- Geoffrey Zakarian (Chef and Owner, The National and The Lambs Club, New York; Judge, 24 Hour Restaurant Battle, Chopped); lost to Masaharu Morimoto in Battle Sardines in Season 8

=== Judges ===
The judges for season four were current Iron Chef Michael Symon, food writer and broadcaster Simon Majumdar, and Iron Chef Judy Joo from Iron Chef UK.

=== Contestant progress ===
Episode	1	2	3	4	5	6	7	8	Comments
Zakarian	WIN	IN	IN	CO	IN	CO	WIN	WIN	The Next Iron Chef
Falkner	IN	IN	WIN	IN	CO	WIN	CO	OUT	Elim: Pressure
Chiarello	IN	CO	IN	WIN	IN	IN	OUT		Elim: Passion
Guarnaschelli	IN	WIN	IN	IN	IN	IN	OUT		Elim: Passion
Burrell	IN	IN	IN	IN	WIN	OUT			Elim: Risk
Samuelsson	CO	IN	IN	IN	OUT				Elim: Storytelling
MacMillan	WIN	IN	CO	OUT					Elim: Improvisation
Hughes	IN	IN	OUT						Elim: Ingenuity
Irvine	IN	OUT							Elim: Transformation
Mendelsohn	OUT								Elim: Resourcefulness

(WIN) The chef won the series.
(WIN) The chef won the chairman's challenge.
(CO) The chef competed in and won the cook-off.
(OUT) The chef lost that week's elimination challenge and cook-off and was eliminated from the competition.

=== Results ===
==== Episode 1: Primal: Heat And Meat ====
- Chairman's Challenge: Resourcefulness

Chefs are paired in teams of two, with Chef Spike choosing the teams. The teams are taken to a remote wilderness location, where they must butcher a half-hog, build a fire, and make two collaborative dishes that demonstrate resourcefulness. The least successful team is sent to the Secret Ingredient Showdown.

Teams

1. Spike Mendelsohn and Marcus Samuelsson
2. Anne Burrell and Robert Irvine
3. Alex Guarnaschelli and Elizabeth Falkner
4. Beau MacMillan and Geoffrey Zakarian
5. Michael Chiarello and Chuck Hughes

- WINNERS: Beau MacMillan and Geoffrey Zakarian

- BOTTOM TWO: Spike Mendelsohn and Marcus Samuelsson

- Secret Ingredient Showdown: Scallops

With the choice of two ingredients under red and black covers, the chefs agree upon a selection. Chefs Spike and Marcus chose the ingredient under the red cover, which was large sea scallops, while the other ingredient, hidden under the black cover, was canned tuna. They are given 30 minutes to produce one dish of Iron Chef quality using the selected ingredient.

- CONTINUING IN THE COMPETITION: Marcus Samuelsson

- ELIMINATED: Spike Mendelsohn

- First aired: October 30, 2011

==== Episode 2: Transformation ====
- Chairman's Challenge: "Take Me Out to the Ballgame"

The chefs are given 15 minutes to gather necessary ingredients from ballpark vendors and 60 minutes to transform two stadium classics at Petco Park. Because they won the first Chairman's Challenge, Chefs Zakarian and MacMillan are given an additional five minutes for gathering ingredients. The two least successful chefs are sent to the Secret Ingredient Showdown.

- WINNER: Alex Guarnaschelli

- BOTTOM TWO: Robert Irvine and Michael Chiarello

- Secret Ingredient Showdown: Peanuts

- CONTINUING IN THE COMPETITION: Michael Chiarello

- ELIMINATED: Robert Irvine

- First Aired: November 6, 2011

==== Episode 3: Ingenuity ====
- Chairman's Challenge: "Let's All Go to the Lobby"

The chefs are asked to create two dishes (one sweet and one savory) demonstrating ingenuity using movie theater candy in 60 minutes. Because she won the second Chairman's Challenge, Chef Guarnaschelli is allowed to select her candy and chose the other chefs' candy. The two least successful chefs are sent to the Secret Ingredient Showdown.

Ingredient Order:

1. Chocolate Covered Raisins: Chef Guarnaschelli
2. Malt Balls: Chef Falkner
3. Popcorn: Chef Hughes
4. Gummy Candy: Chef Chiarello
5. Cinnamon Candy: Chef Zakarian
6. Root Beer: Chef Burrell
7. Chocolate Covered Caramels: Chef Samuelsson
8. Sweet and Sour Candy: Chef MacMillan

- WINNER: Elizabeth Falkner

- BOTTOM TWO: Chuck Hughes and Beau MacMillan

- Secret Ingredient Showdown: Tofu

- CONTINUING IN THE COMPETITION: Beau MacMillan

- ELIMINATED: Chuck Hughes

- First Aired: November 13, 2011

==== Episode 4: Improvisation ====
- Chairman's Challenge: "Food is Funny"

Comedian Kevin Nealon meets the chefs at the Improv Comedy Club and selects four mandatory ingredients the chefs must use: Octopus, Kumquats, Tortillas, and Marshmallows. The chefs must cook a dish using all four ingredients in 45 minutes. Because she won the third Chairman's Challenge, Chef Falkner is given five extra minutes to start the preparation of her dish. The two least successful chefs are sent to the Secret Ingredient Showdown.

- WINNER: Michael Chiarello

- BOTTOM TWO: Geoffrey Zakarian and Beau MacMillan

- Secret Ingredient Showdown: Coconuts

- CONTINUING IN THE COMPETITION: Geoffrey Zakarian

- ELIMINATED: Beau MacMillan

- First Aired: November 20, 2011

==== Episode 5: Storytelling ====
- Chairman's Challenge: "New York on a Plate"

The chefs create a culinary story based on a postcard drawing of New York City landmarks. Because he won the previous Chairman's Challenge, Chef Chiarello is given the choice of landmarks. The chefs have 20 minutes to shop at the Grand Central Market and 45 minutes to cook for six people (the original four judges, along with Iron Chef Marc Forgione and Chef Charlie Palmer) at the Grand Central Terminal. The two least successful chefs are sent to the Secret Ingredient Showdown.

Landmark Order:

1. Statue of Liberty : Chef Chiarello
2. Times Square: Chef Zakarian
3. Broadway: Chef Samuelsson
4. Empire State Building: Chef Guarnaschelli
5. Central Park : Chef Burrell
6. Brooklyn Bridge : Chef Falkner

- WINNER: Anne Burrell

- BOTTOM TWO: Marcus Samuelsson and Elizabeth Falkner

- Secret Ingredient Showdown: Bagels

- CONTINUING IN THE COMPETITION: Elizabeth Falkner

- ELIMINATED: Marcus Samuelsson

- First Aired: November 27, 2011

==== Episode 6: Risk ====
- Chairman's Challenge: "Food Auction"

The Chairman takes the chefs to an auction house in Chelsea, where they each place bids on the shortest amount of time in which they think they can create a dish with each ingredient presented. The fifth ingredient is given to the last remaining chef after all the other ingredients have been won. The chef with the last ingredient gets five minutes less than the lowest bid on any other ingredient. The lowest bid is 25 minutes by Chefs Chiarello and Falkner, therefore giving Chef Guarnaschelli 20 minutes to cook a leg of lamb. By winning the last Chairman's Challenge, Chef Burrell is allowed to be the fourth taster and the least successful chef selected by Chef Burrell (Chef Zakarian) is sent to the Secret Ingredient Showdown along with the other least successful chef chosen by the three regular judges.

Ingredient Order:

1. Canned Sardines: Chef Burrell (50 minutes)
2. Wagyu Beef: Chef Zakarian (30 minutes)
3. Maine Lobster: Chef Chiarello (25 minutes)
4. Tuna Jerky: Chef Falkner (25 minutes)
5. Leg of Lamb: Chef Guarnaschelli (20 minutes)

- WINNER: Elizabeth Falkner

- BOTTOM TWO: Anne Burrell and Geoffrey Zakarian

- Secret Ingredient Showdown: Ponzu and Panko Bread Crumb Dessert

- CONTINUING IN THE COMPETITION: Geoffrey Zakarian

- ELIMINATED: Anne Burrell

- First Aired: December 4, 2011

==== Episode 7: Passion ====
- Chairman's Challenge: "Hamptons Beach Cookout"

The competitors cater a beach cookout for 20 guests, plus the judges, at the Montauk Yacht Club. The chefs are given $500 and two hours to source their own ingredients. Once completed, each chef is given two hours to prepare a three course seafood tasting menu that demonstrates their passion for food. Because she won the previous Chairman's Challenge, Chef Falkner is given a 15 minute head start and a ride in a speedboat to her first location to gather ingredients. A winner is declared for this challenge, the least successful chef is eliminated, and the two remaining chefs go to the Secret Ingredient Showdown in Kitchen Stadium.

- WINNER (advances to the Finale): Geoffrey Zakarian

- ELIMINATED: Alex Guarnaschelli

- Secret Ingredient Showdown: Three-Bite Crackers and Wine Appetizer Course

- CONTINUING IN THE COMPETITION: Elizabeth Falkner

- ELIMINATED: Michael Chiarello

- First Aired: December 11, 2011

==== Episode 8: Pressure ====
- Chairman's Challenge: "The Ultimate Holiday Meal"

Chefs Falkner and Zakarian face a pressure-filled finale in Kitchen Stadium, where the secret ingredients are: Beef Crown Roast, Candy Canes, Clementines, Acorn & Butternut Squash, Salt Cod, Brussels Sprouts, Unfiltered Apple Cider and Parsnips. They must create three Christmas theme dishes with those ingredients for guest judges Bobby Flay and Masaharu Morimoto along with the regular three judges and the Chairman. During the course of the battle, the Chairman's first surprise forces the chefs to use cranberries as another theme ingredient they must create a dish with. Also, he gives them the choice of one former competitor to cook with for 15 minutes on each side of the kitchen, and they both choose Chef Guarnaschelli. The Chairman's second surprise given to the chefs is to create a frozen dessert using the ice cream machine. The Chairman's final surprise is for each chef to make a "holiday-themed" cocktail served in a martini glass.

- WINNER: Geoffrey Zakarian

- ELIMINATED: Elizabeth Falkner

- First Aired: December 18, 2011

== Season 5: 2012: Redemption ==
=== Contestants ===
- Duskie Estes (chef and owner of Zazu Restaurant and Farm, Bovolo and Black Pig Meat Company in Sonoma County, California); Redemption from Season 3
- Elizabeth Falkner (Owner of Citizen Cake and Orson, San Francisco); lost to Cat Cora in Battle Honey in Season 3. Also has appeared on Food Network Challenge; Redemption from Season 4
- Alex Guarnaschelli (Chef and Owner, Butter and The Darby, New York; Host, Alex's Day Off, Judge, Chopped); lost to Cat Cora in Battle Farmers' Market in Season 5; Redemption from Season 4
- Spike Mendelsohn (Chef and Owner, Good Stuff Eatery, Washington D.C.; Host, Kelsey & Spike Cook [Food2.com]); lost to Michael Symon in Battle Prosciutto in Season 8; Redemption from Season 4
- Nate Appleman (Executive Chef and partner, Pulino's Bar and Pizzeria, New York City); lost to Michael Symon in Battle Suckling Pig in Season 7; Redemption from Season 2
- Amanda Freitag (Executive Chef, The Harrison, New York City); lost to Bobby Flay in Battle Alaskan King Crab in Season 7; Judge, Chopped; Redemption from Season 2
- Eric Greenspan (Executive Chef and owner, The Foundry on Melrose, Los Angeles); beat Bobby Flay in Battle Goose in Season 8; Redemption from Season 2
- Jehangir Mehta (Executive Chef and owner, Graffiti, New York City); lost to Masaharu Morimoto in Battle Coconut in Season 7; Redemption from Season 2
- Marcel Vigneron (Owner of the catering company Modern Global Tasting, Los Angeles, California)
- Tim Love (Executive Chef and owner, The Lonesome Dove Western Bistro, Fort Worth, Texas); beat Masaharu Morimoto in Battle Chiles in Season 4

=== Judges ===
The judges for this season are: Iron Chef Geoffrey Zakarian, restaurateur Donatella Arpaia, and food writer Simon Majumdar.

=== Contestant progress ===
Episode	1	2	3	4	5	6	7	8		Comments
Challenge	1	2	3	4	5	6	7	8	9	
Guarnaschelli	WIN	IN	IN	IN	IN	IN	CO	IN	WIN	The Next Iron Chef
Freitag	IN	CO	WIN	IN	IN	WIN	WIN	IN	OUT	Elim: Respect
Appleman	IN	IN	IN	IN	CO	CO	WIN	OUT		Elim: Passion
Vigneron	IN	IN	CO	CO	WIN	IN	OUT			Elim: Transcendence
Mehta	IN	WIN	CO	IN	IN	OUT				Elim: Fusion
Falkner	IN	CO	CO	WIN	OUT					Elim: Risk
Mendelsohn	CO	IN	IN	OUT						Elim: Transformation
Greenspan	IN	IN	OUT							Elim: Simplicity
Estes	IN	OUT								Elim: Innovation
Love	OUT									Elim: Resourcefulness

(WIN) The chef won the series.
(WIN) The chef won the chairman's challenge.
(CO) The chef competed in and won the cook-off.
(OUT) The chef lost that week's elimination challenge and cook-off and was eliminated from the competition.

=== Results ===
==== Episode 1: Resourcefulness ====
- Chairman's Challenge: "Resourcefulness"

Chefs are brought to a beach and given an ingredient that they struggled with in a previous competition.

Ingredients

1. Alex Guarnaschelli: Lobster
2. Amanda Freitag: Shiitake Mushrooms
3. Duskie Estes: Calamari
4. Elizabeth Falkner: Black Garlic
5. Eric Greenspan: Grasshoppers
6. Jehangir Mehta: Buffalo
7. Marcel Vigneron: Avocado
8. Nate Appleman: Banana
9. Spike Mendelsohn: Scallops
10. Tim Love: Kale

- WINNER: Alex Guarnaschelli

- BOTTOM TWO: Spike Mendelsohn and Tim Love

- Secret Ingredient Showdown: Pineapple

The chefs have 30 minutes to create a dish featuring pineapple. Chef Love creates a dish of grilled quail, fried kale, and pickled pineapple. Chef Mendelsohn creates a Vietnamese-inspired sweet and sour branzino.

- CONTINUING IN THE COMPETITION: Spike Mendelsohn

- ELIMINATED: Tim Love

- First aired: November 4, 2012

==== Episode 2: Innovation ====
- Chairman's Challenge: "Innovation"

Chefs are divided into three groups of three, each of which has to develop an innovative version of a global dish - falafel, tacos, or banh mi. As the winning chef of the previous chairman's challenge, Chef Guarnaschelli was allowed to assign each chef to a group.

Groups

1. Tacos: Alex Guarnaschelli, Spike Mendelsohn, Duskie Estes
2. Banh Mi: Eric Greenspan, Nate Appleman, Elizabeth Falkner
3. Falafel: Jehangir Mehta, Marcel Vigneron, Amanda Freitag

- WINNER: Jehangir Mehta (Eric Greenspan and Alex Guarnaschelli were top in their respective groups)

- BOTTOM THREE: Elizabeth Falkner, Amanda Freitag, and Duskie Estes

- Secret Ingredient Showdown: White bread

The chefs have thirty minutes to make a dish highlighting plain white bread. Chef Freitag makes pork meatballs with Parmesan breadcrumbs, Chef Estes makes egg yolk ravioli with bacon brown butter croutons and Chef Falkner makes a Monte Cristo sandwich with french toast ice cream.

- CONTINUING IN THE COMPETITION: Elizabeth Falkner and Amanda Freitag

- ELIMINATED: Duskie Estes

- First aired: November 11, 2012

==== Episode 3: Simplicity ====
- Chairman's Challenge: "Simplicity"

Each chef is photographed by food/chef photographer Todd Selby. The chefs are then split up into four groups of two, with each chef making an amuse bouche that reflects the personality of their opponent. The losing chef in each pairing must cook for their life. As the winner of the previous challenge, Chef Mehta splits up the chefs.

Groups

1. Alex Guarnaschelli and Marcel Vigneron
2. Elizabeth Falkner and Amanda Freitag
3. Nate Appleman and Eric Greenspan
4. Jehangir Mehta and Spike Mendelsohn

- WINNER: Amanda Freitag (Spike Mendelsohn, Alex Guarnaschelli and Nate Appleman won their respective matchups)

- BOTTOM FOUR: Elizabeth Falkner, Jehangir Mehta, Marcel Vigneron and Eric Greenspan

- Secret Ingredient Showdown: Cereal

The chefs must create a dish containing Kellogg's Raisin Bran and Rice Krispies. Chef Vigneron makes a Rice Krispies and Raisin Bran treat with coconut ice cream, Chef Falkner makes a Rice Krispies and Raisin Bran tartufo bianco, Chef Greenspan makes a Rice Krispies crusted tuna over a Raisin Bran purée, and Chef Mehta makes a Rice Krispies crab cake and Raisin Bran chevda.

- CONTINUING IN THE COMPETITION: Elizabeth Falkner, Marcel Vigneron and Jehangir Mehta

- ELIMINATED: Eric Greenspan

- First aired: November 18, 2012

==== Episode 4: Transformation ====
- Chairman's Challenge: "Transformation"

Each chef is asked to transform a canned meat into a high-class dish. The chefs were told to choose from an assortment of cans on the table. Three of the cans only had a question mark on their labels. As the winner of the previous challenge, Chef Freitag chose last and was given the option to steal one of her opponent's cans, forcing them to choose from whatever was left on the table, but she declined.

Ingredients

1. Vigneron: Canned Clams
2. Mehta: Mystery Can (Chicken)
3. Mendelsohn: Canned Vienna Sausage
4. Guarnaschelli: Canned Spiced Ham
5. Falkner: Mystery Can (Roast Beef)
6. Appleman: Mystery Can (Tuna)
7. Freitag: Canned Corned Beef

- WINNER: Elizabeth Falkner

- BOTTOM TWO: Marcel Vigneron and Spike Mendelsohn

- Secret Ingredient Showdown: Lobster

The chefs have thirty minutes to make a dish highlighting lobster as the main ingredient. Chef Mendelsohn makes lobster laksa while Chef Vigneron makes lobster and mango salad. The chefs made the decision to plate their dishes on the same plate. This decision displeased the judges, to the point where they considered eliminating both chefs.

- CONTINUING IN THE COMPETITION: Marcel Vigneron

- ELIMINATED: Spike Mendelsohn

- First aired: November 25, 2012

==== Episode 5: Risk ====
- Chairman's Challenge: "Risk"

The chefs walk into an airplane hangar, where they each place bids on the shortest amount of time in which they think they can create a dish with each ingredient presented. The sixth ingredient is given to the last remaining chef after all the other ingredients have been won. The chef with the last ingredient gets five minutes less than the lowest bid on any other ingredient. The lowest bid is 25 minutes by Chef Mehta, therefore giving Chef Appleman 20 minutes to create a dish out of mortadella. By winning the last Chairman's Challenge, Chef Falkner is allowed to be the fourth taster and the least successful chef selected by Chef Falkner (Chef Appleman) is sent to the Secret Ingredient Showdown along with the other least successful chef chosen by the three regular judges. It is also noted here that the remaining five contestants next week will be going to Vegas.

Ingredients

1. Cow Heads: Marcel Vigneron (50 minutes)
2. Paiche: Elizabeth Falkner (50 minutes)
3. Bison Ribs: Alex Guarnaschelli (45 minutes)
4. Wheel of Parmesan: Amanda Freitag (40 minutes)
5. Ostrich Eggs: Jehangir Mehta (25 minutes)
6. Mortadella: Nate Appleman (20 minutes)

- WINNER: Marcel Vigneron

- BOTTOM TWO: Nate Appleman and Elizabeth Falkner

- Secret Ingredient Showdown: Anchovies

The chefs have thirty minutes to make a dish highlighting anchovies as the main ingredient.
- CONTINUING IN THE COMPETITION: Nate Appleman

- ELIMINATED: Elizabeth Falkner

- First aired: December 2, 2012

==== Episode 6: Fusion ====
- Chairman's Challenge: "Fusion"

The chefs arrive in Las Vegas at the MGM Grand and find out they will be attending a wedding. It is a wedding between two unlikely ingredients. As the winner of the previous challenge, Chef Vigneron gets to choose who gets what pairing he will use and decide the pairings to be used by the remaining chefs. They have 45 minutes to make a dish with the following pairings.

1. Blue Cheese and Peanut Butter: Marcel Vigneron
2. Bone Marrow and Rainbow Candies: Jehangir Mehta
3. Clams and Strawberries: Nate Appleman
4. Chicken Liver and Peppermint Candies: Alex Guarnaschelli
5. Calamari and Miniature Marshmallows: Amanda Freitag

- WINNER: Amanda Freitag

- BOTTOM TWO: Nate Appleman and Jehangir Mehta

- Secret Ingredient Showdown: Shrimp

The chefs have thirty minutes to make a dish highlighting shrimp as the main ingredient, while using a traditional Japanese teppanyaki grill.

- CONTINUING IN THE COMPETITION: Nate Appleman

- ELIMINATED: Jehangir Mehta

- First aired: December 9, 2012

==== Episode 7: Transcendence ====
- Chairman's Challenge: "Transcendence"

The chefs are tasked to prepare a buffet featuring a mystery ingredient chosen by magician David Copperfield: bacon. Chef Freitag, as the winner of the previous challenge, splits the chefs into pairs.

1. Amanda Freitag and Nate Appleman
2. Alex Guarnaschelli and Marcel Vigneron

- WINNERS: Amanda Freitag and Nate Appleman

- BOTTOM TWO: Alex Guarnaschelli and Marcel Vigneron

- Secret Ingredient Showdown: Chocolate

The chefs are asked to choose two types of Hershey's candy and make a savory dish with a holiday theme. Chef Vigneron makes roasted lamb with eggplant camponata and white chocolate curry risotto. Chef Guarnaschelli makes duck breast and white chocolate, fennel and cherry salad with a fried duck heart and dark chocolate.

- CONTINUING IN THE COMPETITION: Alex Guarnaschelli

- ELIMINATED: Marcel Vigneron

- First aired: December 16, 2012

==== Episode 8: Passion and Respect ====
- Chairman's Challenges: "Passion" and "Respect"

The season finale consists of two challenges of Passion and Respect. First in the Passion challenge, the remaining chefs are tasked to create in 45 minutes a dish using an ingredient one of the judges is passionate about. The two most successful chefs proceed to the finale in Kitchen Stadium, while the least successful chef is eliminated.

Ingredients

1. Farm-raised Chicken (Geoffrey Zakarian): Amanda Freitag
2. Haddock (Simon Majumdar): Nate Appleman
3. Sea Urchin (Donatella Arpaia): Alex Guarnaschelli

- FINALISTS: Amanda Freitag and Alex Guarnaschelli

- ELIMINATED: Nate Appleman

In Kitchen Stadium, the final Respect challenge requires Chef Guarnaschelli and Chef Freitag to create three dishes in one hour, assisted by two sous chefs each. Each of their offerings must include two ingredients per dish that are staples in the dishes of three senior Iron Chefs: Iron Chef Bobby Flay, Iron Chef Masaharu Morimoto, and Iron Chef Michael Symon. The Chefs are told to pay respect to the Iron Chefs' signature flavors, while still cooking in their own style and showcasing their own abilities. Iron Chefs Flay, Morimoto, and Symon also appear as guest judges along with the three regular judges.

Ingredients

1. Bobby Flay: Corn, Avocado, Limes, Chili Peppers
2. Masaharu Morimoto: Panko, Ponzu, Soy Sauce, Miso, Daikon Radish, Wasabi
3. Michael Symon: Eggplant, Feta Cheese, Olives, Phyllo Dough

- WINNER: Alex Guarnaschelli

- ELIMINATED: Amanda Freitag

- First aired: December 23, 2012

== Vietnamese version ==
A Vietnamese version of The Next Iron Chef premiered on November 18, 2012, on VTV3 which also broadcasts Iron Chef Vietnam. It premiered a week after Iron Chef Vietnam ended the first series.

== Thai version ==
A Thai version of The Next Iron Chef premiered on June 23, 2019, on Channel 7 (Thailand) During The Iron Chef Season 8
