= Marco Canora =

American chef

- Born: Elizabeth, New Jersey, U.S.
- Education: Pace University
- Culinary career
- Cooking style: Italian
- Current restaurants: Hearth Restaurant (New York City); Terroir wine bar (New York City)
- Television shows: The Next Iron Chef; Chopped

Marco Canora is an American chef, restaurateur and television personality. He has appeared on the Food Network on shows such as The Next Iron Chef, Chopped and Top Chef. Canora owns the Hearth Restaurant and Terroir wine bar in New York and is also the founder of Brodo, a marketer, producer and seller of bone broth.

Canora has authored three cookbooks. Salt to Taste: The Keys To Confident, Delicious Cooking was nominated for the 2010 James Beard Publishing Award.

== Career ==
=== Chef and restaurateur ===
Canora started his career working as a line cook at Gramercy Tavern, an American restaurant in New York city. In 1993, he moved to Piccolo Mondo as a chef, developing a small yet devoted following. He subsequently moved to Florence, where he worked at Cibrèo.

Canora returned to US and opened La Cucina, an Italian seasonal restaurant in Edgartown, Massachusetts. La Cucina earned rave reviews and media attention with high-profile guests including Bill Clinton. In 2001, he moved back to his home state of New York and joined Gramercy Tavern as a chef. In 2001, Gramercy Tavern's owner selected Canora to open a new restaurant, Craft, which received three stars from The New York Times. During his time at Craft, he created the menu for Craftbar.

In 2003, Canora launched his own venture, partnering with Paul Grieco to open Hearth Restaurant in Manhattan. Canora and the restaurant have won or have been nominated six times for The James Beard Foundation Award. In 2008, Grieco and Canora opened a wine bar, Terroir.

== Brodo ==
In November, 2014, Canora opened Brodo which serves hot cups of bone broth. The original location was a window attached to Hearth and has since expanded to a standalone shop and two temporary stalls in New York.

== Awards and achievements ==
Canora appeared in 2010 The Next Iron Chef series and finished as the runner-up. He was also featured as a judge on Chopped on the Food Network. Canora won the 2017 James Beard Award for Best Chef: New York City for Hearth. He had been nominated five other times.

== Cookbooks ==
- Canora, Marco (2015-12-01). Brodo: A Bone Broth Cookbook. Potter/TenSpeed/Harmony. ISBN 9780553459517.
- Canora, Marco (2009-10-13). Salt to Taste: The Key to Confident, Delicious Cooking. Rodale. ISBN 9781594867804.
- Canora, Marco; Walker, Tammy (2014-12-30). A Good Food Day: Reboot Your Health with Food That Tastes Great. Potter/TenSpeed/Harmony. ISBN 9780385344920.
