= Celina Tio =

American chef

- Born: 1970 or 1971 (age 55–56)
- Education: Drexel University
- Children: 1
- Culinary career
- Current restaurant: The Belfry
- Previous restaurants: Collection; Julian; The American Restaurant
- Television shows: Top Chef Masters; Iron Chef America; The Next Iron Chef; Bar Rescue
- Award won: James Beard Foundation Award 2007 Best Mid-West Chef

Celina Tio is an American chef. She has appeared on several Food Network television series and she owns The Belfry restaurant in Kansas City.

== Career ==
Celina Tio trained at Drexel University. Her first culinary work was in the kitchen of a Bennigan's Irish pub-themed casual dining restaurant, after convincing the manager to take her on. She then began working at the Ritz-Carlton Philadelphia. By the time she was 23, she was executive chef at the grill room within the hotel. She then moved to Florida, where she opened the Mediterranean restaurant Spoodles, the French restaurant Citricos, and the Northern Italian restaurant Palo for Walt Disney World. She then moved to Missouri, to work as executive chef at the American Restaurant in Kansas City. While there, she was named Best Chef by Chef magazine in 2005 and won the James Beard Foundation Award for Best Mid-West Chef in 2007.

She subsequently left to open her own restaurant, Julian in Brookside, Kansas City, in 2009. While at Julian, Tio appeared on several television cooking series such as Top Chef Masters, Iron Chef America and The Next Iron Chef. Julian was a change in cuisine for Tio, with a more relaxed menu instead of the fine dining she served while at the American Restaurant. She opened a second restaurant, called Collection, in 2013, and a further restaurant entitled The Belfry, during the following year.

After eight years, Tio decided not to renew the lease for Julian in 2017, saying "I’ve been very fortunate that Julian has been and remains successful and am super grateful for all the continued support of my guests over the years. But I feel like the time is right to move on and give another local restaurateur an opportunity to thrive in Brookside".

In January 2023, Tio launched a spirits company called ANNX Spirits.

== Personal life ==
Regarding her ethnicity, Tio has described herself as "half-Chinese".
