= Alex Guarnaschelli =

American chef (born 1969)

- Born: Alexandra Maria Guarnaschelli; June 20, 1969 (age 57); St. Louis, Missouri, U.S.
- Education: Barnard College
- Known for: Chef, cookbook author, television personality
- Spouse: Brandon Clark (2007–2015)
- Children: 1
- Culinary career
- Current restaurant
- Butter Midtown, New York City (2003–present)
- Previous restaurant
- The Darby, New York City (?–2013)
- Television shows
- The Best Thing I Ever Ate; The Cooking Loft with Alex Guarnaschelli; Food Network Challenge; Chopped; Iron Chef America; Alex's Day Off; All-Star Academy; Supermarket Stakeout; Worst Cooks in America; Alex vs. America; The Kitchen
- Website: www.alexguarnaschelli.com

Alexandra Maria Guarnaschelli (born June 20, 1969) is an American chef, cookbook author, and television personality. She currently serves as an executive chef at New York City's Butter restaurant and was executive chef at The Darby restaurant before its closing. Guarnaschelli studied cooking extensively in France.

She appears as a television personality on the Food Network shows The Kitchen, Chopped (as a judge), Iron Chef America, All Star Family Cook-off, Guy's Grocery Games (as both a judge and a competitor), and The Best Thing I Ever Ate. She hosts Alex's Day Off, The Cooking Loft, and Supermarket Stakeout. In 2012, she won that season of The Next Iron Chef: Redemption. In January 2022, she premiered her newest show, Alex vs. America, also on Food Network.

In 2013, Guarnaschelli's first cookbook was published. Old-School Comfort Food: The Way I Learned to Cook mixes autobiographical details with favorite recipes from her professional life that she adapted for the home.

== Early life ==
Guarnaschelli was the only child of cookbook editor, the late Maria Guarnaschelli and John Guarnaschelli. She was born in St. Louis, Missouri, but the family moved to New York City when she was just a few days old.

Guarnaschelli's culinary experience started while watching her mother test numerous recipes at home while editing cookbooks.

She graduated from Horace Mann School in 1987 and from Barnard College in 1991 with a degree in art history.

== Career ==
In 1991, she worked for minimum wage in a restaurant, An American Place, for one year.

Guarnaschelli worked under Larry Forgione (whose son is Iron Chef Marc Forgione), and then at a number of restaurants in France, New York and Los Angeles, including Guy Savoy's La Butte Chaillot. She also worked at Daniel Boulud's eponymous restaurant and Joachim Splichal's Patina, before becoming the executive chef at Butter Midtown in 2003. She was executive chef at The Darby restaurant before its closing in 2013. She chairs the Museum of Food and Drink's Culinary Council.

In 2022, it was announced that Guarnaschelli became godmother of the Discovery Princess cruise ship.

== Television appearances ==
Guarnaschelli was a competitor on The Food Network's Iron Chef America, taking on Cat Cora in the 2007 "Farmers' Market Battle." Cora won the challenge. Guarnaschelli has since appeared as a judge on the program. In 2011, she competed in the fourth season of The Next Iron Chef, where she placed as the third runner-up. She also competed on the Food Network Challenge Ultimate Thanksgiving Feast episode and lost the competition. After competing in the fourth season of The Next Iron Chef, Guarnaschelli became a sous chef to Iron Chef Geoffrey Zakarian.

In 2008, she became the host of The Food Network's The Cooking Loft with Alex Guarnaschelli, in which the chef teaches a small group of students how to construct new variations of classic dishes. Guarnaschelli has been a judge on Food Network's competition show Food Network Challenge, and frequently appears as a judge on Food Network's cooking competition show Chopped, Cooks Vs. Cons, Young and Hungry, and Guy's Grocery Games, as had appeared on the Food series The Best Thing I Ever Ate.

Guarnaschelli starred in the Food Network television show Alex's Day Off, which premiered in October 2009. It ran for three seasons and 32 episodes She competed in season 5 of The Next Iron Chef: Redemption, winning in the final Kitchen Stadium showdown against chef Amanda Freitag. Her debut challenge as an Iron Chef on Iron Chef America aired on December 30, 2012. Guarnaschelli made guest appearances on the Nickelodeon television show Nicky, Ricky, Dicky & Dawn, on the one-hour special "Go Hollywood" on November 25, 2015 and later on the ABC television show The Real O'Neals in the episode "The Real Thanksgiving" on November 15, 2016.

She later made appearances as a judge in episode five of Iron Chef Gauntlet, where chef Sarah Gruenberg was eliminated before the final showdown in episode six "The Gauntlet", and on the Food Network's Beat Bobby Flay, in which she challenged Bobby with her signature lobster dish and also won that challenge. She made a guest appearance as herself in the season 5 finale of the ABC Family sitcom Young and Hungry, in which her job offer to Emily Osment's main protagonist Gabi serves as the crux to the episode's storyline, left unresolved due to cancellation of both the show and a planned film wrap-up. She also appeared in the Showtime series Billions and as a mentor on season 20 of Worst Cooks in America as the captain of the Blue Team, opposite Anne Burrell. Alex ultimately became the winning mentor.

In 2022, she premiered Alex vs. America, also on Food Network.

== Personal life ==
On April 29, 2007, Guarnaschelli married Brandon Clark. The two met in 2006 at New York's Institute of Culinary Education while Alex was teaching a fish class. They had a daughter.

The couple's marriage eventually ended, and in June 2020, Guarnaschelli announced her engagement to chef Michael Castellon, a Chopped winner who had proposed to her on her birthday over the weekend of June 19–20. In February 2022, it was announced that the couple ended their engagement.

== Filmography ==
Television
Year	Show	Role	Notes
2007–2018	Iron Chef America	Herself / Iron Chef; Sous Chef / Judge	Was a sous chef under Geoffrey Zakarian before becoming an Iron Chef
2008	The Cooking Loft	Host	
2008	Dear Food Network: Thanksgiving	Herself	
2009	Food Detectives	Herself	Season 2 episode 1: "Tastes Like Chicken"
2009–2011	Alex's Day Off	Host	
2009–2018	Food Network Star	Host / Judge	
2009–present	Chopped	Herself / Judge / Competitor	216 episodes
2009–2019	The Best Thing I Ever Ate	Herself	45 episodes
2010	Dear Food Network	Herself	Episode: "Thanksgiving Top Ten 2"
2010	Chefography	Herself	Episode: "Alex Guarnaschelli"
2010–2020	Worst Cooks in America	Herself / Mentor	Blue Team mentor - Season 20; Critic - Season 1 episode 6: "Final Test"
2011–2012	Thanksgiving Live!	Herself	TV special
2011–2012	The Perfect 3	Herself	4 episodes
2011–2013	The Best Thing I Ever Made	Herself	10 episodes
2012–2015	Rachael vs. Guy: Celebrity Cook-Off	Herself / Judge	4 episodes
2012	Iron Chef America Countdown	Herself	6 episodes
2012	Unique Eats	Herself	3 episodes
2013	Southern Fried Everything	Herself	Episode 2: "Fair Fare"
2013–present	Beat Bobby Flay	Herself / Judge / Competitor	45 episodes
2014	America's Best Cook	Herself / Mentor	
2014	Deadliest Catch: The Bait	Herself	2 episodes
2014–2021, and since 2025	Guy's Grocery Games	Herself / Judge / Mentor; Competitor / Judge and Competitor	28 episodes
2015	Best. Ever.	Herself	Episode 3: "Best. Burger. Ever."
2015	Burgers, Brew and 'Que	Herself	Season 1 episode 3: "Finger-Licking Good"
2015	Thanksgiving at Bobby's	Herself	
2015	Christmas at Bobby's	Herself	
2015–2016	All-Star Academy	Herself / Mentor / Judge	16 episodes
2015–2016	Chopped After Hours	Herself	14 episodes - 1 episode as host
2015–2016	Guilty Pleasures	Herself	8 episodes
2016	The Real O'Neals	Herself	Season 2 episode 5: "The Real Tradition"
2016–2017	Cooks vs. Cons	Herself / Judge	15 episodes
2016–2019	Chopped Junior	Herself / Judge	11 episodes
2017	Legend of Iron Chef	Herself	
2017	Iron Chef Eats	Herself	
2017–2019	Guy's Ranch Kitchen	Herself	15 episodes
2018	Iron Chef Gauntlet	Herself	Season 2 episode 4: "Ingenuity"
2018	Ideal Home	Alex	
2018	Young & Hungry	Herself	Season 5 episode 20: "Young & Yacht'in"
2018–2019	Ultimate Thanksgiving Challenge	Herself / Judge	
2019	Bottle Service	Herself	Episode: "Sip, Savor, Spit with Alex Guarnaschelli"
2019	Martha Bakes	Herself	Season 11 episode 12: "Pantry Milks"
2019	Billions	Herself	Season 4 episode 12: "Extreme Sandbox"
2019	Family Restaurant Rivals	Herself / Judge	Episode 8: "Family Freezer Burn"
2019	Good Eats	Herself	Season 15 was dubbed on screen as Good Eats: The Return; Season 15 episode 5: "My Shakshuka"
2019–present	Supermarket Stakeout	Host	
2020	All-Star Best Thing I Ever Ate	Herself	8 episodes
2020–2024	The Kitchen	Herself / co-host	
2022–present	Alex vs. America	Herself	
2023–present	Ciao House	Herself	

== Bibliography ==
- Old School Comfort Food: The Way I Learned to Cook (Clarkson Potter, 2013) ISBN 9780307956552
- The Home Cook (Clarkson Potter, 2017) ISBN 9780307956583
- Cook With Me (Clarkson Potter, 2020) ISBN 9780593135082
