= Donatella Arpaia =

American restaurateur and television personality

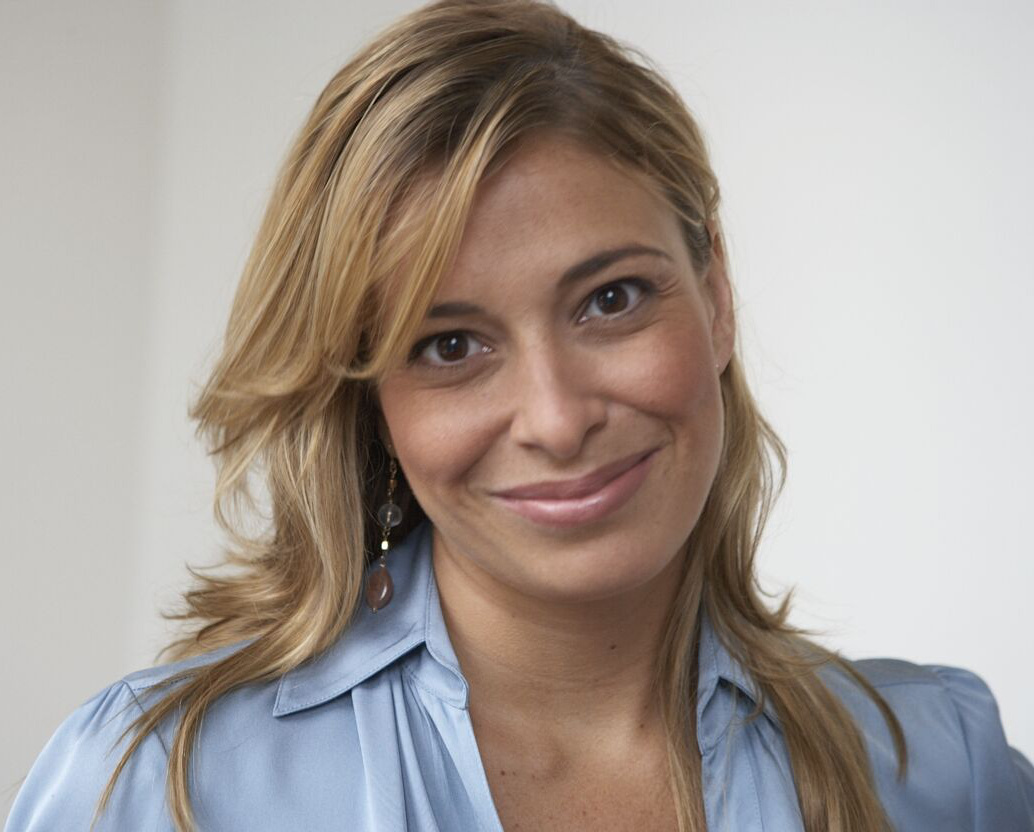
- Born: September 15, 1971 (age 55)
- Education: Fairfield, B.A.; St. John's Law, J.D.; French Culinary Institute, Le Grand Diplôme, Classic Culinary Arts
- Spouse: Allan Stewart
- Culinary career
- Ratings
- Michelin stars AAA Motor Club
- Previous restaurants
- Bellini (1998–2003); davidburke&donatella (2003–2008); kefi (2003–2018); Anthos (2007–2010); Mia Dona (2008–2013); Donatella (2010–2014)
- Television shows
- Iron Chef America; The Next Iron Chef
- Website: donatellaarpaia.com

Donatella Arpaia Stewart (born September 15, 1971) is an American restaurateur and a television personality who appears on The Food Network. Arpaia is a regular judge on The Food Network's Iron Chef America and The Next Iron Chef. She has also appeared on The Isaac Mizrahi Show, The Martha Stewart Show, The Tony Danza Show, The Today Show and iVillage.

== Career ==
Following a brief career as a corporate attorney, Arpaia opened her first restaurant, Bellini, in 1998. Her other restaurants include davidburke&donatella, which has received four stars from Forbes and the Five Diamond Award and Anthos, a Michelin Star Greek restaurant which was named Best New Restaurant by New York and Esquire in November 2007, and nominated for a James Beard Foundation Award for Best New Restaurant. The restaurant retained a Michelin star rating from 2007 to 2010. Mia Dona, another restaurant she created, opened in February 2008.

Zagat named Arpaia "The Hostess with the Mostest" in March 2006 and Crain's named her one of its "40 under 40", and the New York Post named Arpaia 31st of "The 50 Most Powerful Women in NYC".

In 2007, Arpaia and chef Michael Psilakis opened restaurant Kefi on the Upper West Side of Manhattan in New York City. Its meatballs were named as the best in the city in New York's 2007 "Best of New York" issue.

In mid-2009, Arpaia and Psilakis opened Eos in Miami's Viceroy Hotel, her first restaurant opened outside of New York.

== Education ==
Arpaia graduated from Kellenberg Memorial High School in Uniondale, Long Island in 1989. Arpaia received her bachelor's degree from Fairfield University in Fairfield, Connecticut and her juris doctor from the St. John's University School of Law in Queens, New York. She studied at the French Culinary Institute and the Italian Culinary Academy.

== Personal life ==
Arpaia was raised in Woodmere, New York, on Long Island to Maria and chef Lello Arpaia (who began his career at Delmonico's under the ownership of Oscar Tucci), who immigrated to the US from Italy. In May 2011, Arpaia married Allan Stewart, a cardiac surgeon and graduate of Rutgers New Jersey Medical School. On September 15, 2011, her 40th birthday, the couple had a son.

== Awards ==
- 2007-2010: One Michelin Star, Anthos (Greek restaurant), Michelin Guide
