= Simon Majumdar =

British-American chef

Simon Majumdar (born April 7, 1964) is a British-born food and travel author, and food television personality. He has appeared on many Food Network shows and is based in Los Angeles and London. He also judges on shows such as Iron Chef.

== Early and personal life ==
Majumdar was brought up in Rotherham, South Yorkshire, England by his Welsh mother and Indian father, a middle child out of four children. His father Pratip "Pat" Majumdar was born in Calcutta and was an Orthopedic consultant for Rotherham United F.C. His mother, Gwen John, was from South Wales and worked as a nurse; his parents met while working at the Royal Gwent Hospital in the 1950s.

Majumdar previously worked as a book publisher and started working with food after the age of 40. After his mother fell ill and eventually died, he was depressed and not enjoying his prior career in publishing so he decided in 2007 to "go everywhere, eat everything" which changed his life path.

He met his wife Sybil Villanueva while traveling in Brazil in 2010; Sybil is a Filipino American. He became a citizen of the United States on September 17, 2014.

== Writing ==
With his older brother Robin, Majumdar co-authored a UK food blog "Dos Hermanos" from 2006 until 2012, which had thousands of readers a day. Majumdar is an author and contributor to; The Guardian, The Independent, AskMen.com, The Daily Beast, and more. He has written books titled Fed, White, and Blue; Eat My Globe; and Eating For Britain.

== Television ==
He has appeared as a judge on the Food Network shows Cutthroat Kitchen (2013–2016), Iron Chef America (2010–2012), All Star Academy (2015), Beat Bobby Flay (2014–2017) and The Next Iron Chef (2010–2012). Majumdar is severely allergic to coffee and oysters, and will not taste any dish prepared by a competitor that includes either of these ingredients. He is known for a love of Indian cuisine.

He was a guest on the show The Best Thing I Ever Ate (2010–2011) with foods found in California, Louisiana and Kansas. Majumdar was a guest critic on the UK show Market Kitchen.

Majumdar is occasionally a judge on Guy's Grocery Games. He has also worked with Guy Fieri on Food Network’s Tournament of Champions as a floor reporter for the blind taste test.
