= Jose Garces =

Ecuadorian American chef and restaurateur

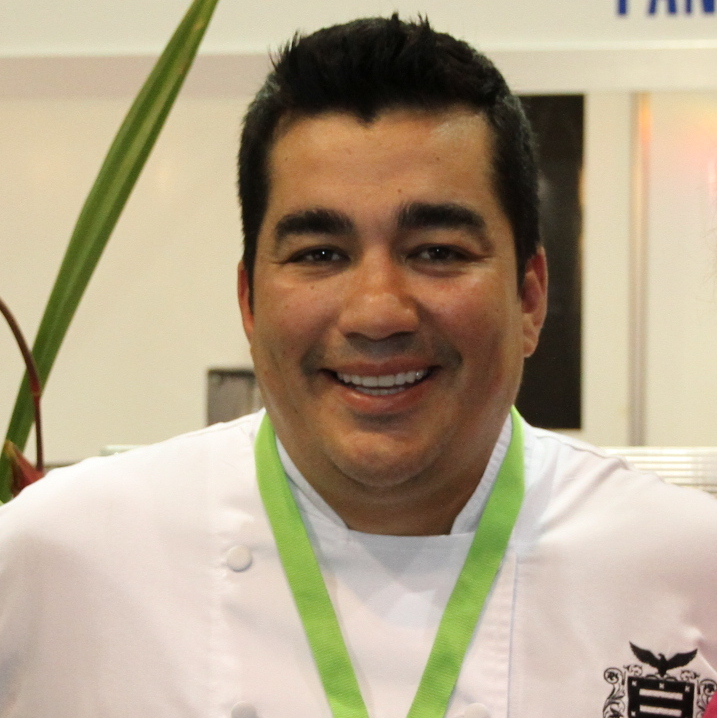
- Garces in 2011
- Education: Kendall College
- Spouse: Dr. Beatriz Garces
- Culinary career
- Cooking style: Latin cuisine
- Current restaurants: Amada (2005-); Tinto (2007 -); Mercat a la Planxa (2008 - ); Distrito Cantina (2008 - ); Village Whiskey (2009 - ); JG Domestic (2010 - ); Volvér (2014 - ); The Olde Bar (2015 - ); Buena Onda (2015 - ); Olón (2017 - ); Okatshe (2017 - )
- Previous restaurants: Hook & Master (2021 - 2023); Garces Trading Company (2008 - 2018); Chifa (2009 - 2013); Old Town Whiskey (2011 - 2013); El Jefe (2013 - 2016); Rural Society (2014 -2017); 24 (2017 -2018)
- Television shows: Iron Chef America (2008 as a challenger, 2010 - 2018 as an Iron Chef); The Next Iron Chef (2009); Tournament of Champions (2023)
- Award won: James Beard Foundation Award – 2009
- Website: www.chefgarces.com

Jose Garces is an American -Ecuadorian - Spanish chef, restaurant owner, and Iron Chef. He was born in Chicago to Ecuadorian parents. He won in the second season of The Next Iron Chef.

== Early life ==
Garces was born in the early 1970s in Chicago, Illinois. He is the second of three children born to parents Jorge and Magdalena Garces and is of Ecuadorian heritage. He played varsity football and wrestled as a student at Gordon Technical High School. Garces studied Culinary Arts at Kendall College in Chicago, graduating in 1996.

After graduating from college, Garces traveled to Spain to gain experience in European-style cooking and cuisine, returning to the United States a few years later to work in New York City.

== Career ==
Chef Douglas Rodriguez opened Alma de Cuba in Philadelphia with Garces as his executive chef in 2001.

Garces opened his first restaurant in 2005, Amada, named after his grandmother. The Spanish tapas restaurant was followed by restaurant concepts with locations in Philadelphia, Chicago, Arizona, New Jersey, Palm Springs, Washington, D.C., and New York City. Following a few years of financial and legal challenges, Garces filed for bankruptcy in 2018 and sold his restaurants to IdEATion Hospitality as part of a restructuring.

IdEATion, along with Chef Garces, now run seven restaurants in Philadelphia: Amada, Tinto, Village Whiskey, Garces Trading Company, JG Domestic, Volvér, and Buena Onda. IdEATion and Chef Garces also manage four restaurants at the Ocean Casino Resort in Atlantic City, New Jersey: Amada - Ocean, Distrito Cantina - Ocean, Olón - Tropicana, and Okatshe - Tropicana.

== Television ==
Garces has been a challenger on Iron Chef America, defeating Bobby Flay on a 2008 episode featuring melon. He also competed in the second season of The Next Iron Chef and he was selected the sixth Iron Chef after defeating opponent chef Jehangir Mehta on November 22, 2009. Garces debuted as an Iron Chef on January 17, 2010, when he defeated Seattle chef Rachel Yang in Battle Hawaiian Moi. In 2023, Garces was a competitor in season 4 of Tournament of Champions.

== Personal life ==
In 2002, he married Beatriz Garces, a dentist. The couple has a daughter, Olivia, and a son, Andres. They later divorced and he married Jill Garces.

== Awards and honors ==
- 2009: Best Chef Mid-Atlantic, James Beard Foundation
