= Marc Forgione =

American chef (born 1978)

- Born: December 16, 1978 (age 47); New York City, NY
- Education: University of Massachusetts Amherst
- Culinary career
- Current restaurant(s): Restaurant Marc Forgione, Peasant, One Fifth, Khe-Yo
- Television show(s): The Next Iron Chef Iron Chef America The Best Thing I Ever Ate
- Website: ChefMarcForgione.com

Marc Forgione (born December 16, 1978) is an American chef who competed in Food Network's Iron Chef America and is now owner of Restaurant Marc Forgione in Tribeca, New York City, Peasant in NOLITA NYC and One Fifth in NYC. He was born on December 16, 1978, and raised in Bellerose, New York. Chef Forgione won the season three of The Next Iron Chef in 2010.

== Early life ==
Marc began his career at age 16, joining his father, Larry Forgione, in the kitchen at An American Place. Marc fully embraced his father's livelihood and has built on his unique culinary foundation to carve out an identity of his own. Marc is related to Francesco Forgione, a Catholic saint, who is a great, great uncle of his father Larry.

Marc opted for a traditional four-year education at the University of Massachusetts Amherst, where he graduated from the School of Hotel and Restaurant Management. He spent his summers working the line at restaurants in New York, with chef Kazuto Matsusaka. These stints would lay the groundwork for Marc's post-collegiate toils, again alongside his father at An American Place and later under Patricia Yeo at AZ. When Yeo and celebrated chef Pino Maffeo opened Pazo, they took Marc along to serve as sous chef at the short-lived eatery. When Laurent Tourondel set out to develop his flagship, BLT Steak, he recruited Marc as his sous chef.

To diversify his experience, Marc left for France, where he secured a series of humble posts under Michel Guerard in Eugenie Les Bains. He worked at three of the region's restaurants, Le Pres D'Eugenie, Ferme aux Grives and Le Cuisine Minceur.

== Career ==
When he returned to New York, Marc reunited with Tourondel, who invited him to serve as chef de cuisine at BLT Prime. Following his role as chef de cuisine, Marc was named corporate chef for the BLT Restaurant Group, a position that enabled him to develop recipes and maintain the quality of the BLT brand as it went on to include more restaurants across the country. Marc has played a key role in the openings of BLT Fish and BLT Market, as well as the Washington, D.C., San Juan, Puerto Rico, and Dallas locations of BLT Steak.

Marc received a star in the Michelin Guide New York City 2012, making him the youngest American-born chef to receive the honor in consecutive years (2010, 2011, 2012). In addition, Marc received a two-star review from Sam Sifton of The New York Times.

The restaurant also earned the distinction of being named "Key Newcomer" by Zagat Guide 2009, "Top 25 Restaurants in NYC" by Modern Luxury magazine, and "All-Star Eatery" by Forbes. Marc was awarded the "Star Chefs Rising Star of the Year Award 2010," named "Rising Star 2008" by Restaurant Hospitality, and mentioned "New Formalist" by Esquire in 2008.

In January 2012, Marc announced he would be opening a new steakhouse at the Revel Resort & Casino in Atlantic City called American Cut.

In summer 2013 he partnered with Executive Chef Soulayphet Schwader to open Khe-Yo, a Laotian-inspired restaurant using local market ingredients.

Chef Marc Forgione opened his second outpost (and the flagship location) of American Cut in New York City in September 2013.

Chef Forgione's first cookbook, Marc Forgione: Recipes and Stories from the Acclaimed Chef and Restaurant was published in late April 2014 by Houghton Mifflin Harcourt.
