= Bobby's Triple Threat =

- Genre: Cooking
- Starring: Bobby Flay; Brooke Williamson; Michael Voltaggio; Tiffany Derry; Ayesha Nurdjaja
- Country of origin: United States
- Original language: English
- No. of seasons: 5
- No. of episodes: 48

Original release
- Network: Food Network
- Release: September 27, 2022 – present

Bobby's Triple Threat is a television series featuring chef Bobby Flay on the Food Network, in the United States.

== Format ==
Bobby Flay invites a chef to his club to compete in three culinary rounds against his handpicked "titans": Brooke Williamson, Michael Voltaggio and Ayesha Nurdjaja. Nurdjaja replaced Tiffany Derry, who participated in the first three seasons of the show. For each round, the challenger picks a different titan to cook against. In the first two rounds, Flay provides two ingredients for the chefs to cook with to make two dishes in 45 minutes. In the final round, the challenger picks the two ingredients they and the final titan will cook with; they have 40 minutes to prepare one dish. Each round is judged in a blind taste test by a single judge (who is not revealed until after the first battle), with the first two rounds worth 10 points each and the final round worth 20 points. If the challenger has a higher final score than the titans, they win $25,000 in cash and a locker at the club with their name plastered on, allowing them to return to the club whenever they want to.

The presentation of Bobby's Triple Threat has many elements of an exclusive club, with the set having a bar and bartender and the audience watching the matches at tables while having drinks. The challenger enters the club through a hidden door disguised as an enormous painting after giving Flay a password, which is always a certain food. If the challenger wins the game, they are given the cash prize by Flay in a duffel bag and enjoy a drink with him and his titans. If the challenger loses, they leave and the titans drink with Flay to celebrate their victory.

== Episodes ==
=== Season 1 ===
№	#	Original airdate	Contestant	Judge	Round 1		Round 2		Round 3		Final Result
№	#	Original airdate	Contestant	Judge	Ingredients/Titan	Result	Ingredients/Titan	Result	Ingredients/Titan	Result	Final Result
1	1	September 27, 2022	Jonathon Sawyer	Nancy Silverton	oysters & horseradish (Derry)	L; 6-8	filet mignon & blue cheese (Voltaggio)	L; 5-7	black truffles & eggs (Williamson)	T; 15-15	L; 26-30
2	2	October 4, 2022	Kevin Tien	Chris Scott	prawns & soy sauce (Voltaggio)	W; 9-7	sweet potatoes & molasses (Williamson)	L; 6-9	condensed milk & lime leaves (Derry)	L; 13-18	L; 28-34
3	3	October 11, 2022	Claudette Zepeda	Marc Forgione	pineapple & chipotle (Derry)	T; 6-6	duck & oranges (Voltaggio)	W; 9-8	huitlacoche & masa (Williamson)	W; 18-16	W; 33-30
4	4	October 18, 2022	Adriana Urbina	Michelle Bernstein	red snapper & mangoes (Voltaggio)	T; 7-7	scallops & avocado (Williamson)	L; 5-8	dry purple corn & heart of palm (Derry)	L; 15-17	L; 27-32
5	5	October 25, 2022	Viet Pham	Frank Prisinzano	pork tenderloin & apple (Voltaggio)	L; 5-9	potato & chives (Williamson)	W; 8-5	chicken thighs & red cabbage (Derry)	W; 18-10	W; 31-24
6	6	November 1, 2022	Brittanny Anderson	Michael Psilakis	chicken & paprika (Derry)	W; 8-7	zucchini & parmigiano reggiano (Voltaggio)	W; 10-7	hen-of-the-woods mushrooms & green peppercorns (Williamson)	W; 18-17	W; 36-31

=== Season 2 ===
№	#	Original airdate	Contestant	Judge	Round 1		Round 2		Round 3		Final Result
№	#	Original airdate	Contestant	Judge	Ingredients/Titan	Result	Ingredients/Titan	Result	Ingredients/Titan	Result	Final Result
7	1	August 22, 2023	Michael Symon	Naomi Pomeroy	pistachios & honey (Voltaggio)	L; 7-8	black garlic & tofu (Derry)	L; 5-6	lamb hearts & greek yogurt (Williamson)	W; 18-17	L; 30-31
8	2	August 29, 2023	Esther Choi	Francis Lam	flanken cut short ribs & Asian pear (Derry)	W; 7-6	serrano chiles & avocado (Voltaggio)	L; 7-9	pork belly & kimchi (Williamson)	W; 17-15	W; 31-30
9	3	September 5, 2023	Scott Conant	Jonathan Waxman	tomato & eggs (Williamson)	L; 7-8	lobster & butter (Voltaggio)	W; 7-6	baby goat shoulder & estratto di pomodoro (Derry)	W; 17-15	W; 31-29
10	4	September 12, 2023	Jose Garces	Aliya LeeKong	plantains & shrimp (Voltaggio)	L; 6-7	guanciale & pecorino (Derry)	T; 7-7	pigs' feet & achiote (Williamson)	L; 18-19	L; 31-33
11	5	September 19, 2023	Mei Lin	Stephanie Izard	pork tenderloin & blood orange (Voltaggio)	W; 6-5	cherry tomatoes & saffron (Williamson)	L; 7-9	rack of lamb & celery (Derry)	W; 19-16	W; 32-30
12	6	September 26, 2023	Kelvin Fernandez	Adrienne Cheatham	black beans & chicken (Voltaggio)	L; 6-7	hot Italian sausage & red bell peppers (Williamson)	L; 7-8	corn & mushrooms (Derry)	T; 18-18	L; 31-33
13	7	October 3, 2023	Byron Gomez	Ayesha Nurdjaja	skirt steak & sichuan peppercorns (Derry)	W; 7-6	peanuts & ancho chiles (Voltaggio)	W; 9-8	red snapper & yucca (Williamson)	L; 16-19	L; 32-33
14	8	October 10, 2023	Kelsey Barnard Clark	Michael Lomonaco	blue crab & okra (Voltaggio)	L; 6-7	quail eggs & bacon (Williamson)	T; 8-8	catfish & lima beans (Derry)	W; 19-17	W; 33-32
15	9	October 17, 2023	Shota Nakajima	Gavin Kaysen	salmon & red miso (Voltaggio)	L; 6-8	hanger steak & cheddar cheese (Derry)	W; 6-5	black cod & burdock root (Williamson)	W; 16-13	W; 28-26
16	10	October 24, 2023	Rashida Holmes	Cliff Crooks	goat meat & scotch bonnet (Williamson)	L; 5-7	mussels & fennel (Derry)	L; 6-9	conch & young coconut (Voltaggio)	L; 12-20	L; 23-36

=== Season 3 ===
№	#	Original airdate	Contestant	Judge	Round 1		Round 2		Round 3		Final Result
№	#	Original airdate	Contestant	Judge	Ingredients/Titan	Result	Ingredients/Titan	Result	Ingredients/Titan	Result	Final Result
17	1	July 9, 2024	Marcus Samuelsson	Ken Oringer	salmon & lime (Williamson)	W; 8-6	brioche & blackberries (Voltaggio)	T; 7-7	hen duck & geoduck (Derry)	T; 19-19	W; 34-32
18	2	July 16, 2024	Shirley Chung	Geoffrey Zakarian	king crab & mustard (Voltaggio)	W; 8-7	ground beef & shallots (Derry)	W; 8-7	pork belly & doubanjiang (Williamson)	W; 17-15	W; 33-29
19	3	July 23, 2024	Silvia Barban	Andrew Zimmern	duck breast & pomegranate (Derry)	L; 7-8	Arborio rice & gorgonzola (Voltaggio)	W; 9-7	sweetbread & colatura (Williamson)	W; 18-16	W; 34-31
20	4	August 6, 2024	Kevin Lee	Lucinda Scala Quinn	scallops & ginger (Derry)	W; 8-5	beef tenderloin & cognac (Voltaggio)	W; 9-6	sweet potatoes & kimchi (Williamson)	L; 11-18	L; 28-29
21	5	August 13, 2024	Eric Adjepong	Chris Cheung	rack of lamb & mint (Voltaggio)	T; 7-7	mussels & fresno chilies (Derry)	L; 6-9	goat leg & tamarind (Williamson)	L; 16-18	L; 29-34
22	6	August 20, 2024	Ayaka Guido	Frank Prisinzano	chorizo & clams (Voltaggio)	W; 8-4	rib eye steak & jalapeño (Williamson)	L; 6-10	savoy cabbage & lapsang tea (Derry)	W; 14-13	W; 28-27
23	7	August 27, 2024	Kaleena Bliss	Hillary Sterling	ahi tuna & capers (Derry)	T; 6-6	New York strip steak & eggs (Williamson)	L; 5-7	pork collar & Japanese eggplant (Voltaggio)	L; 14-16	L; 25-29
24	8	September 3, 2024	Katsuji Tanabe	Judy Joo	Dungeness crab & tomatillo (Voltaggio)	T; 7-7	chicken & green olives (Derry)	L; 8-9	beef tongue & shiso (Williamson)	W; 19-17	W; 34-33
25	9	September 10, 2024	Ashleigh Shanti	Wylie Dufresne	slab bacon & frisée (Voltaggio)	W; 8-7	skirt steak & piquillo peppers (Derry)	L; 6-9	chanterelles & chicken liver (Williamson)	W; 17-16	L; 31-32
26	10	September 17, 2024	Michael Jenkins	Amanda Freitag	lobster & Calabrian chilies (Derry)	L; 6-8	gruyère & potatoes (Williamson)	T; 7-7	artichokes & pistachios (Voltaggio)	L; 17-18	L; 30-33

=== Season 4 ===
№	#	Original airdate	Contestant	Judge	Round 1		Round 2		Round 3		Final Result
№	#	Original airdate	Contestant	Judge	Ingredients/Titan	Result	Ingredients/Titan	Result	Ingredients/Titan	Result	Final Result
27	1	September 2, 2025	Nini Nguyen	Daniel Boulud	crayfish & beef tenderloin (Williamson)	L; 6-8	black kale & wild mushrooms (Voltaggio)	L; 8-9	pork shoulder & rice flour (Nurdjaja)	W; 16-15	L; 30-32
28	2	September 9, 2025	Bryan Voltaggio	Michael Solomonov	pork tenderloin & bourbon (Williamson)	L; 7-9	eggs & bucheron (Nurdjaja)	L; 6-10	Maryland blue crab & pawpaw vinegar (Voltaggio)	W; 20-19	L; 33-38
29	3	September 16, 2025	Jet Tila	Lorena Garcia	duck & habanero chilies (Voltaggio)	T; 7-7	eggplant & manchego cheese (Williamson)	W; 7-6	trout & morning glory (Nurdjaja)	W; 19-15	W; 33-28
30	4	September 23, 2025	Dale Talde	Giada De Laurentiis	pork ribs & molasses (Voltaggio)	W; 7-6	piquillo peppers & goat cheese (Williamson)	W; 10-9	dungeness crab & sushi rice (Nurdjaja)	L; 10-19	L; 27-34
31	5	September 30, 2025	Maneet Chauhan	Charlie Mitchell	lamb loin & mangos (Williamson)	T; 6-6	yellowfin tuna & avocado (Nurdjaja)	W; 6-5	flattened rice & fox nuts (Voltaggio)	L; 12-17	L; 24-28
32	6	October 7, 2025	Martel Stone	Lorna Maseko	sweet potatoes & limes (Voltaggio)	T; 7-7	lobster & Ossetra caviar (Nurdjaja)	L; 7-8	suya spice & gooseberries (Williamson)	W; 18-16	W; 32-31
33	7	October 14, 2025	Avishar Barua	Leah Cohen	yellowtail & pineapple (Voltaggio)	L; 5-8	Yukon Gold potatoes & Parmigiano-Reggiano cheese (Nurdjaja)	L; 5-9	besan & baby spinach (Williamson)	T; 17-17	L; 27-34
34	8	October 21, 2025	Adrianne Calvo	Rick Bayless	octopus & sour orange (Voltaggio)	L; 5-7	slab bacon & honey (Nurdjaja)	L; 7-9	New Zealand rack of lamb & guava (Williamson)	L; 12-16	L; 24-32
35	9	October 28, 2025	Michelle Wallace	Katie Lee	whole chicken & peanuts (Williamson)	L; 7-8	heirloom carrots & Greek yogurt (Voltaggio)	W; 9-6	mussels & 'nduja (Nurdjaja)	W; 19-18	W; 35-32
36	10	November 4, 2025	Karen Akunowicz	Scott Conant	scallops & blood orange (Voltaggio)	W; 9-7	porterhouse steak & gochujang (Williamson)	L; 7-9	monkfish & prosciutto (Nurdjaja)	L; 15-19	L; 31-35

=== Season 5 ===
№	#	Original airdate	Contestant	Judge	Round 1		Round 2		Round 3		Final Result
№	#	Original airdate	Contestant	Judge	Ingredients/Titan	Result	Ingredients/Titan	Result	Ingredients/Titan	Result	Final Result
37	1	August 25, 2026	Alex Stupak	Buddha Lo	sea urchin & cherry tomatoes (Williamson)	L; 4-8	chicken & lemongrass (Voltaggio)	L; 6-7	orange blossom water & Sicilian pistachios (Nurdjaja)	W; 19-13	W; 29-28
38	2	September 1, 2026	Suchanan "Bao Bao" Aksornnan	Viet Pham	Dungeness crab & Sungold tomatoes (Voltaggio)	T; 7-7	quail & mango (Nurdjaja)	L; 6-10	pork belly & daikon (Williamson)	W; 18-17	L; 31-34
39	3	September 8, 2026	Antonia Lofaso	Stefano Secchi	red bell peppers & provolone (Voltaggio)	L; 6-7	bay scallops & yuzu (Nurdjaja)	L; 6-8	ricotta & Campari tomatoes (Williamson)	W; 14-12	L; 26-27
40	4	September 15, 2026	Danny Garcia	Cosme Aguilar	squid & squid ink (Williamson)	L; 7-8	Yukon Gold potatoes & smoked paprika (Voltaggio)	W; 8-6	hamachi collar & ají amarillo (Nurdjaja)	T; 16-16	W; 31-30
41	5	September 22, 2026	Kenny Gilbert	Nina Compton	eggs & wild mushrooms (Williamson)	L; 6-9	sweet Italian sausage & broccoli rabe (Nurdjaja)	L; 7-8	collard greens & cornmeal (Voltaggio)	T; 20-20	L; 33-37
42	6	September 29, 2026	Chris Oh	Priya Krishna	red prawns & mustard greens (Nurdjaja)	L; 5-9	skirt steak & fresh horseradish (Voltaggio)	W; 7-6	doenjang & silken tofu (Williamson)	L; 17-18	L; 29-33
43	7	October 6, 2026	Yia Vang	Michael Mina	Manila clams & Sichuan peppercorn (Voltaggio)	W; 8-7	Castelfranco & hazelnuts (Nurdjaja)	W; 9-7	pineapple & beaver (Williamson)	L; 16-17	W; 33-31
44	8	October 13, 2026	Angelo Sosa	Michael White	Spanish chorizo & pecorino romano (Voltaggio)	W; 8-6	oysters & black garlic (Williamson)	T; 6-6	cacao nibs & grasshoppers (Nurdjaja)	L; 13-16	L; 27-28
45	9	October 20, 2026	Sara Bradley	Melissa Clark	whole duck & apricot (Williamson)	W; 8-6	delicata squash & artisanal honey (Nurdjaja)	T; 8-8	pork spare ribs & benne seeds (Voltaggio)	W; 18-15	W; 34-29
46	10	October 27, 2026	Emme Ribeiro Collins	Susan Feniger	toro & green onion (Nurdjaja)	L; 6-9	eggplant & miso (Williamson)	L; 6-8	roasted peanuts & dried shrimp (Voltaggio)	L; 13-15	L; 25-32
47	11	November 3, 2026	Katianna Hong	Evan Funke	wagyu beef (Williamson)	W; 9-8	salt cod & yellow bell peppers (Voltaggio)	W; 8-7	ocean trout & white kimchi (Nurdjaja)	W; 20-18	W; 37-33
48	12	November 10, 2026	Geoffrey Zakarian	Stephen Kalt	beef tenderloin & puff pastry (Williamson)	T; 8-8	ground pork & burrata (Voltaggio)	W; 8-7	dark chocolate & French butter (Nurdjaja)	L; 16-18	L; 32-33
