= 24 in 24: Last Chef Standing series 1 =

24 in 24: Last Chef Standing
- Season 1
- Judges: Michael Symon; Esther Choi
- No. of contestants: 24
- Winner: Marcel Vigneron
- Runner-up: Carlos Anthony
- No. of episodes: 8

Release
- Original network: Food Network
- Original release: 14 April – 11 June 2024

Series chronology
- Next → Series 2

The first series of the American reality television series 24 in 24: Last Chef Standing began on 14 April 2024 and aired on Food Network, concluding on 11 June 2024 after Marcel Vigneron was named the winner. The series was hosted by Michael Symon and Esther Choi.

== Chefs ==
=== Top 24 ===
Chef	Time Completed	Status
Marcel Vigneron	24 hours, 24 challenges	Winner (Shift 8, Challenge 24)
Carlos Anthony	24 hours, 24 challenges	Runner-up (Shift 8, Challenge 24)
Chris Oh	23 hours and 15 minutes, 23 challenges	Third place (Shift 8, Challenge 23)
Mika Leon	22 hours and 12 minutes, 22 challenges	Fourth place (Shift 8, Challenge 22)
Chris Dodson	20 hours and 49 minutes, 20 challenges	Eliminated (Shift 7, Challenge 20)
Martel Stone	17 hours and 40 minutes, 17 challenges	Eliminated (Shift 6, Challenge 17)
Kess Eshun	14 hours and 45 minutes, 14 challenges	Eliminated (Shift 5, Challenges 13 and 14)
Christopher Ingram	11 hours and 55 minutes, 9 challenges	Eliminated (Shift 4, Challenge 11)
Camille La Caer	11 hours and 55 minutes, 9 challenges	Eliminated (Shift 4, Challenge 11)
Gabriella Baldwin	7 hours and 58 minutes, 9 challenges	Eliminated (Shift 3, Challenge 9)
Josie Clemens	5 hours and 48 minutes, 6 challenges	Eliminated (Shift 2, Challenges 5 and 6)
Vijay Sadhu	4 hours and 2 minutes, 3 challenges	Eliminated (Shift 2, Challenge 4)
Emilie Rose Bishop	1 hour and 45 minutes, 1 challenge	Eliminated (Shift 1, Challenge 2)
Elizabeth Falkner	1 hour and 45 minutes, 1 challenge	Eliminated (Shift 1, Challenge 2)
Declan Horgan	1 hour and 45 minutes, 1 challenge	Eliminated (Shift 1, Challenge 2)
Airis Johnson	1 hour and 45 minutes, 1 challenge	Eliminated (Shift 1, Challenge 2)
Matt Jordan	1 hour and 45 minutes, 1 challenge	Eliminated (Shift 1, Challenge 2)
Daniel Lee	1 hour and 45 minutes, 1 challenge	Eliminated (Shift 1, Challenge 2)
Viet Pham	1 hour and 45 minutes, 1 challenge	Eliminated (Shift 1, Challenge 2)
Marc Quiñones	1 hour and 45 minutes, 1 challenge	Eliminated (Shift 1, Challenge 2)
Charlie Ray	1 hour and 45 minutes, 1 challenge	Eliminated (Shift 1, Challenge 2)
Chad Rosenthal	1 hour and 45 minutes, 1 challenge	Eliminated (Shift 1, Challenge 2)
Aarthi Sampath	1 hour and 45 minutes, 1 challenge	Eliminated (Shift 1, Challenge 2)
Michael Toscano	1 hour and 45 minutes, 1 challenge	Eliminated (Shift 1, Challenge 2)

== Guest Judges ==
- Jet Tila - Shift 1, Shift 8
- Stephanie Izard - Shift 2, Shift 8
- Scott Conant - Shift 3, Shift 8
- Michael Voltaggio - Shift 4
- Bryan Voltaggio - Shift 4
- Eric Adjepong - Shift 5
- Maneet Chauhan - Shift 6
- Brooke Williamson - Shift 7

== Elimination chart ==
No.	Shift	1			2	3	4	5	6	7	8		
No.	Challenge Winner(s)	Marcel			Carlos	Camille; Chris O. Marcel	Kess; Martel; Marcel	Mika; Marcel	Carlos; Chris O. Marcel	Mika	None		
1	Marcel	7th	Top 12	$2400	IN	C. W.	$2400	$2400	$4800	Top 4	Top 3	Top 2	Winner
2	Carlos	6th	Top 12	IN	$2400	Top 6	Top 5	IN	Imm.	Top 4	Top 3	Top 2	Runner-up
3	Chris O.	11th	Top 12	IN	Top 2	C. W.	Btm 4	Btm 2	Imm.	Top 4	Top 3	3rd	Eliminated (23 hours and 15 minutes)
4	Mika	22nd	Top 12	IN	IN	Top 3	Btm 4	C. W.	IN	$5000	4th	Eliminated (22 hours and 12 minutes)	
5	Chris D.	3rd	Top 12	IN	Btm 2	Btm 3	Top 5	IN	Top 4	Elim	Eliminated (20 hours and 49 minutes)		
6	Martel	24th	Top 12	Top 2	IN	Top 6	$2400	IN	Elim	Eliminated (17 hours and 40 minutes)			
7	Kess	15th	Top 12	IN	IN	Btm 3	$2400	Elim	Eliminated (14 hours and 45 minutes)				
8-9	Christopher	13th	Top 12	IN	IN	Top 3	Elim	Eliminated (11 hours and 55 minutes)					
8-9	Camille	10th	Top 12	Btm 2	IN	C. W.	Elim	Eliminated (11 hours and 55 minutes)					
10	Gabriella	2nd	Top 12	IN	IN	Elim	Eliminated (7 hours and 58 minutes)						
11	Josie	14th	Top 12	IN	Elim	Eliminated (5 hours and 48 minutes)							
12	Vijay	17th	Top 12	Elim	Eliminated (4 hours and 2 minutes)								
13-24	Emilie	20th	Elim	Eliminated (1 hour and 45 minutes)									
13-24	Elizabeth	16th	Elim	Eliminated (1 hour and 45 minutes)									
13-24	Declan	21st	Elim	Eliminated (1 hour and 45 minutes)									
13-24	Airis	23rd	Elim	Eliminated (1 hour and 45 minutes)									
13-24	Matt	1st	Elim	Eliminated (1 hour and 45 minutes)									
13-24	Daniel	18th	Elim	Eliminated (1 hour and 45 minutes)									
13-24	Viet	5th	Elim	Eliminated (1 hour and 45 minutes)									
13-24	Marc	12th	Elim	Eliminated (1 hour and 45 minutes)									
13-24	Charlie	9th	Elim	Eliminated (1 hour and 45 minutes)									
13-24	Chad	4th	Elim	Eliminated (1 hour and 45 minutes)									
13-24	Aarthi	19th	Elim	Eliminated (1 hour and 45 minutes)									
13-24	Michael	8th	Elim	Eliminated (1 hour and 45 minutes)									

== Challenges ==
=== Shift 1: Speed ===
- Challenge #1: For the first challenge; the 24 chefs must dice eight onions, turn eight artichokes, and pit eight avocados fast where two of them are able to claim one of the twelve stations featuring an assigned protein.
- Challenge #2: The chefs who paired in their desired station are now cooking against each other where they had to cook a one bite dish with their protein. They will be decided by the guest judge who chose the winner to claim the twelve slots in the following challenges.

- Top 12: Carlos Anthony, Gabriella Baldwin, Josie Clemens, Chris Dodson, Kess Eshun, Christopher Ingram, Camille La Caer, Mika Leon, Chris Oh, Vijay Sadhu, Martel Stone, Marcel Vigneron

- Challenge #3: The 12 remaining chefs had 12 minutes to cook a dish featuring eggs with the winner will receive the cash prize of $2400.

- Challenge Winner: Marcel Vigneron ($2400)
- Bottom Two: Camille La Caer, Vijay Sadhu

=== Shift 2: Adaptability ===
- Challenge #4: In this next shift, the bottom two chefs select their choice of ingredients in three minutes to make an appetizer that highlights coffee. The chefs are told to switch stations and they now had to cook with the ingredients from their selected competitor in 27 minutes.

- Eliminated: Vijay Sandhu

- Challenge #5 and #6: The next two challenges instruct the chefs to make a burger dish for the prize money of $2400 in 30 minutes without the use of ground meat and buns alongside a fried side using only an oil spray.

- Challenge Winner: Carlos Anthony ($2400)
- Bottom Two: Josie Clemens, Chris Dodson
- Eliminated: Josie Clemens

=== Shift 3: Resourcefulness ===
- Challenge #7: The remaining ten chefs face a three-round three dish meal elimination challenge where they have to cook their dishes with the use of a single bag of groceries. The top three breakfast dishes will be saved from the first round in 25 minutes. The challenge winners with the best course in each round will receive an advantage.

- Top 3: Christopher Ingram, Camille La Caer (Challenge Winner), Mika Leon

- Challenge #8: The remaining chefs got 50 minutes to produce their lunch dishes.

- Top 6: Carlos Anthony, Chris Oh (Challenge Winner), Martel Stone

- Challenge #9: The last four chefs create their supper dishes in 90 minutes.

- Challenge Winner: Marcel Vigneron
- Bottom Three: Gabriella Baldwin, Chris Dodson, Kess Eshun
- Eliminated: Gabriella Baldwin

=== Shift 4: Teamwork ===
- Challenge #10: The three winners of the previous shift each took turns to select their two members to form groups of three. In every 12-minute round, each member produce a game day dish featuring one of the three stadium snacks (popcorn, pretzels, and beer). The winning team will each receive $2400.

- Top 3: Kess Eshun ($2400), Martel Stone ($2400), Marcel Vigneron ($2400)

- Challenge #11: The other chefs are divided into pairs to cook a paired dish in 30 minutes. In each ten minute period, one chef must prep the dish for their partner to take its turn to cook it before both chefs finish the dish in the last ten minutes.

- Top 5: Carlos Anthony, Chris Dodson
- Bottom Four: Christopher Ingram, Camille La Caer, Mika Leon, Chris Oh
- Eliminated: Christopher Ingram, Camille La Caer

=== Shift 5: Artistry ===
- Challenge #12: Centering on artistry, the chefs create a dish that was judged solely on presentation in ten minutes with the use of frozen meals and the winner will receive an advantage in the next challenge.

- Challenge Winner: Mika Leon

- Challenge #13 and #14: The challenge winner will pick their choice of color and assign the other chefs with the remaining colors to feature both their main and dessert dishes in 45 minutes for the cash prize of $2400.

- Challenge Winner: Marcel Vigneron ($2400)
- Bottom Two: Kess Eshun, Chris Oh
- Eliminated: Kess Eshun

=== Shift 6: Risk Taking ===
- Challenge #15: The six chefs got 30 minutes to cook a spiced rice dish to earn enough score points in criteria received by the guest judge. The three-round elimination challenge will send the chef home with the lowest score after the third round.

- Results: Carlos Anthony (93), Chris Dodson (89), Mika Leon (88), Chris Oh (92), Martel Stone (80), Marcel Vigneron (90)

- Challenge #16: The four chefs at the bottom of the leaderboard will have the option to retain their scoring or participate the second round for additional points against the two chefs who had the highest scores and will later grant immunity in the third round and advance to the next shift. In the second round, the chefs have to taste and identify five ingredients of a smoothie where they will receive 20 points for all five correct answers but will lose 10 points for one incorrect guess.

- Immunity: Carlos Anthony, Chris Oh
- Deduction: Chris Dodson (79)

- Challenge #17: The chefs compete in a duel battle where they had 30 minutes to make a dish with the use of one of the two selected kitchen appliances. The chef who was currently in the first rank selects the equipment and the chef who will cook against. The two chefs who won the battle will wager their choice of score points and the highest score will reward the chef with $4800.

- Challenge Winner: Marcel Vigneron (95/$4800)
- Eliminated: Martel Stone

=== Shift 7: Simplicity ===
- Challenge #18: The last five chefs have 30 minutes to cook a dish utilizing only five ingredients and the winner of this challenge will receive a cash prize of $5000.

- Challenge Winner: Mika Leon ($5000)

- Challenge #19: Each chef had 20 minutes before cooking in the third challenge. They compete in a series of trivia questions where every correct answer will earn 5 minutes each to add in their cook time.

- Results: Carlos Anthony (35 minutes), Chris Dodson (35 minutes), Mika Leon (30 minutes), Chris Oh (25 minutes), Marcel Vigneron (35 minutes)

- Challenge #20: With the use of their cook time from the previous challenge, the chefs must cook their best chicken dishes where the final four will be named and advance to the last shift.

- Top 4: Carlos Anthony, Mika Leon, Chris Oh, Marcel Vigneron
- Eliminated: Chris Dodson

=== Shift 8: Elevation ===
- Challenge #21: The final four chefs must compete in their first challenge from Shift 1 to race for their choice of proteins in the last three challenges to create their elevated three-course dishes. In each round, one chef will be eliminated in the next two challenges and leaves the last two remaining chefs to compete in the final round.
- Challenge #22: In 20 minutes, the chefs selected one of their proteins to cook a one bite dish.

- Eliminated: Mika Leon

- Challenge #23: The three remaining chefs got 25 minutes to make their appetizers with the use of one of their remaining proteins.

- Eliminated: Chris Oh

- Challenge #24: The final two chefs compete in the final round to determine the winner where they used the last of their proteins to cook a high-quality entrée meal within the remaining time during the 24-hour period. The winner will receive the grand cash prize of $50,000 and $24,000 for a trip to Hawaii.

- Winner: Marcel Vigneron
- Runner-Up: Carlos Anthony

== Reception ==
Andy Dehnart from Reality Blurred gave the show a C grade.
