= Avishar Barua =

American chef and restaurateur

- Born: 1986 or 1987; Columbus, Ohio, U.S.
- Education: Ohio State University; Columbus State Community College
- Culinary career
- Cooking style: Bengali American
- Current restaurants
- Joya's (2022–present); Agni (2023–present)
- Previous restaurant
- Service Bar (2017–2021)
- Television shows
- Top Chef: Portland; Beat Bobby Flay; Bobby's Triple Threat; 24 in 24: Last Chef Standing
- Website: avisharbarua.com

Avishar Barua (born 1986 or 1987) is an American chef and restaurateur based in Columbus, Ohio. He owns Joya's, a daytime café in Worthington, and Agni, a tasting-menu restaurant in Columbus's Brewery District. His cooking combines the Bengali food of his family with Midwestern American dishes.

Barua competed on Top Chef: Portland, the eighteenth season of the Bravo series Top Chef, in 2021. He won his episode of Food Network's Beat Bobby Flay in 2023 and reached the finale of the third season of 24 in 24: Last Chef Standing in 2026. The James Beard Foundation named him a semifinalist for Best Chef: Great Lakes in 2024 and 2025. Agni was included in Bon Appétit's list of the 20 best new restaurants of 2024 and in USA Today's Restaurants of the Year for 2025.

== Early life and education ==
Barua was born in Columbus, Ohio, to parents who emigrated from Bangladesh by way of Detroit. His father is an anesthesiologist. His mother, Jayasree, known as Joya, was a homemaker. He has an older brother, and he grew up in Delaware and later in Gahanna. Barua has credited his mother's cooking, which he describes as Bengali American, with forming his palate. He graduated from Columbus Academy in 2005.

Barua enrolled at Ohio State University, where he studied biology and psychology on a pre-medical track and took the Medical College Admission Test. He turned down a place at the Culinary Institute of America and enrolled in the culinary apprenticeship program at Columbus State Community College, from which he graduated in 2013. In an interview with Columbus Underground, Barua said his family had opposed his decision to become a cook.

== Career ==
=== Early career ===
Barua's early restaurant jobs included work as a line cook at 8 in Columbus and as sous chef at 1808 American Bistro in Delaware, under chef Josh Dalton. Dalton persuaded Barua and fellow cook Silas Caeton to remain in Ohio and help open Veritas Tavern in Delaware in 2012, where the two were listed as the restaurant's chefs. Columbus Monthly named Veritas Tavern its Best New Restaurant in 2014.

Barua then moved to New York City, where he worked for about six weeks at Mission Chinese Food and then at wd~50, the restaurant of chef Wylie Dufresne. Dufresne told Columbus Alive that Barua started in the restaurant's basement prep kitchen and was later assigned to research and development projects.

=== Service Bar ===
After returning to Columbus, Barua helped open Service Bar, the restaurant at the Middle West Spirits distillery, in October 2017. He served as its executive chef and later also as its general manager. The menu included the Cheesy Brisket Crunch, a reworking of Taco Bell's gordita made with Bengali fry bread and smoked brisket. Columbus Underground reported that the dish had drawn attention from Food & Wine. A 2019 Columbus Monthly review found the dish too dry and wrote that the kitchen's execution needed refining. Columbus Alive named Barua the city's best chef in 2019.

Service Bar paused service for renovations in June 2021, and Barua left the restaurant afterward.

=== Joya's ===
Barua opened Joya's, a café named for his mother, at 657 High Street in Old Worthington on August 31, 2022, in the former Sassafras Bakery space. He has said the space was first meant to serve as an office for Agni. The daytime menu is built on Bengali dishes and also draws on Chinese, Korean and Thai cooking and on American fast food; the café's milk chai uses his mother's recipe. Columbus Monthly included Joya's in its Best New Restaurants of 2023, and the James Beard Foundation named Barua a semifinalist for Best Chef: Great Lakes in 2024 for his work there. The café was featured on Diners, Drive-Ins and Dives in 2024.

In September 2026, the Worthington Municipal Planning Commission approved an expansion of Joya's that adds about 60 seats and dinner service.

=== Agni ===
Barua opened Agni at 716 South High Street in Columbus's Brewery District in March 2023, in the building formerly occupied by the restaurant Ambrose and Eve. The restaurant is named for Agni, the Hindu god of fire, and its kitchen centers on a wood-fired grill. Agni serves a multicourse tasting menu, which ran to as many as 14 courses in 2025. The printed menu lists the culinary influences behind each dish, with places that range from Dublin and Oaxaca to Kolkata and Gahanna.

Writing in Bon Appétit in 2024, Li Goldstein described most of Agni's dishes as tributes to people or places that had inspired members of the kitchen staff. In a 2023 review for The Columbus Dispatch, G. A. Benton ranked Agni among the best restaurants in Columbus, citing its tasting menu, wine list, cocktails and service.

Columbus Monthly named Agni its Best New Restaurant of the Year in 2024. Later that year, Bon Appétit included it in its list of the 20 best new restaurants in the United States. In 2025, the James Beard Foundation again named Barua a semifinalist for Best Chef: Great Lakes, this time for Agni. The same year, USA Today named Agni one of its Restaurants of the Year, citing its 14-course tasting menu, and Wine Spectator gave the restaurant its Best of Award of Excellence for a wine program of about 375 selections.

== Cooking style ==
Barua describes his food as Bengali American, the same term he uses for his mother's home cooking. Erin Edwards of The Infatuation wrote that Agni often gives the Bengali recipes Barua grew up with "creative and nostalgic Midwestern spins", and a 2025 Columbus Monthly review described the restaurant's food as rooted in the Midwest while drawing on international flavors. Wine Spectator noted that the menu also draws on the food traditions of Barua's staff.

Several of his dishes rework American fast food and packaged food. Examples include the Cheesy Brisket Crunch at Service Bar, an anellini pasta with kofta meatballs at Agni modeled on Chef Boyardee, and a version of a Wendy's Frosty with fries on Agni's Midwest Nostalgia menu. In a 2026 interview with Nation's Restaurant News, Barua said humor is part of how he approaches fine dining.

== Television ==
Barua's first television appearance was on Food Network's Guy's Grocery Games in 2020, where he reached the final round.

The producers of Top Chef invited Barua to apply for the show's eighteenth season, Top Chef: Portland, which was filmed in Portland, Oregon, in the fall of 2020 and premiered on April 1, 2021. In the second episode, he and Shota Nakajima won the Elimination Challenge, a team challenge that required dishes made with both beer and coffee. In the third episode, he won the Quickfire Challenge, a layered-dessert challenge, with a buckeye bonbon, which earned him immunity from elimination and US$10,000. He was eliminated in the seventh episode, broadcast on May 13, 2021, in a challenge in which the chefs cooked meals for workers at three Portland hospitals with José Andrés's World Central Kitchen. The judges criticized the flavor of his Bengali-style beef curry; Kwame Onwuachi was the episode's guest judge. He finished ninth of the 15 contestants. He then competed on the online companion series Last Chance Kitchen and was eliminated in his first challenge there, against Sasha Grumman.

On May 11, 2023, Barua appeared on Beat Bobby Flay. In the episode, titled "This Is How We (Kati) Roll", he defeated Romain Paumier of the New York restaurant Daniel in the first round and then defeated Bobby Flay with a lamb kati roll.

Joya's appeared on Diners, Drive-Ins and Dives, hosted by Columbus native Guy Fieri, in a season 40 episode broadcast in 2024. On October 14, 2025, Barua competed on Bobby's Triple Threat and lost to all three of Flay's "Titans"; chef Leah Cohen was a judge.

In 2026, Barua was one of 24 chefs on the third season of 24 in 24: Last Chef Standing, which premiered on April 26, 2026. He was one of the six chefs who reached the season finale, broadcast on May 31, 2026, which Lee Anne Wong won.

Television appearances
Year	Title	Network	Notes	Ref.
2020	Guy's Grocery Games	Food Network	Contestant; reached the final round	
2021	Top Chef: Portland	Bravo	Contestant; won one Elimination Challenge and one Quickfire Challenge; placed ninth of 15	
2023	Beat Bobby Flay	Food Network	Episode: "This Is How We (Kati) Roll"; won	
2024	Diners, Drive-Ins and Dives	Food Network	Season 40; Joya's featured	
2025	Bobby's Triple Threat	Food Network	Episode: "Titans vs Avishar Barua"; lost	
2026	24 in 24: Last Chef Standing	Food Network	Season 3 contestant; finalist	

== Recognition ==
Year	Recognition	Recipient	Ref.
2014	Columbus Monthly Best New Restaurant	Veritas Tavern, with Barua as co-chef	
2019	Best Chef, Columbus Alive	Barua	
2021–2025	First place, Columbus Underground readers' poll of Columbus chefs	Barua	
2023	Columbus Monthly Best New Restaurants	Joya's	
2024	James Beard Foundation Award semifinalist, Best Chef: Great Lakes	Barua, for Joya's	
2024	Columbus Monthly Best New Restaurant of the Year	Agni	
2024	Bon Appétit 20 Best New Restaurants	Agni	
2025	James Beard Foundation Award semifinalist, Best Chef: Great Lakes	Barua, for Agni	
2025	USA Today Restaurants of the Year	Agni	
2025	Wine Spectator Best of Award of Excellence	Agni	
2025	Columbus Monthly Best Restaurants in Columbus	Agni	
2025	Young Alumni Award, Columbus Academy	Barua	

== Other activities ==
Barua has volunteered with the Mid-Ohio Food Collective, and early in the COVID-19 pandemic he prepared boxed meals for people experiencing homelessness in Columbus. He also gives speeches, hosts food-focused travel for diners and consults for other businesses.
