= 24 in 24: Last Chef Standing series 2 =

24 in 24: Last Chef Standing
- Season 2
- Judges: Michael Symon; Esther Choi
- No. of contestants: 24
- No. of episodes: 8

Release
- Original network: Food Network
- Original release: 27 April 2025

Series chronology
- ← Previous; Series 1 Next → Series 3

The second series of the American reality television series 24 in 24: Last Chef Standing premiered on 27 April 2025 and aired on Food Network.

== Chefs ==
The 24 chefs were announced on 12 March 2025. Stephanie Izard and Bryan Voltaggio previously appeared in the first season as guest judges.

=== Top 24 ===
Chef	Time Completed	Status
Jonathon Sawyer	24 hours, 24 challenges	Winner (Shift 8, Challenge 24)
Bryan Voltaggio	24 hours, 24 challenges	Runner-Up (Shift 8, Challenge 24)
Stephanie Izard	23 hours, 23 challenges	Eliminated (Shift 8, Challenge 23)
Nini Nguyen	23 hours, 23 challenges	Eliminated (Shift 8, Challenge 23)
Kevin Lee	21 hours and 41 minutes, 22 challenges	Eliminated (Shift 8, Challenge 22)
Kelsey Murphy	20 hours and 20 minutes, 20 challenges	Eliminated (Shift 7, Challenge 20)
Kathleen O'Brien-Price	20 hours and 20 minutes, 20 challenges	Eliminated (Shift 7, Challenge 20)
Gabe Bertaccini	19 hours and 2 minutes, 17 challenges	Eliminated (Shift 7, Challenge 18)
Elia Aboumrad	15 hours and 25 minutes, 15 challenges	Eliminated (Shift 5, Challenge 15)
Damaris Phillips	12 hours and 28 minutes, 12 challenges	Eliminated (Shift 4, Challenge 12)
Brittanny Anderson	8 hours and 56 minutes, 9 challenges	Eliminated (Shift 3, Challenge 9)
Laurence Louie	6 hours and 59 minutes, 6 challenges	Eliminated (Shift 2, Challenge 5)
LT Smith	4 hours and 28 minutes, 4 challenges	Eliminated (Shift 2, Challenge 4)
Samantha Cruz	3 hours and 9 minutes, 3 challenges	Eliminated (Shift 1, Challenge 3)
Leslie Daniel	3 hours and 9 minutes, 3 challenges	Eliminated (Shift 1, Challenge 3)
Richie Farina	3 hours and 9 minutes, 3 challenges	Eliminated (Shift 1, Challenge 3)
Ilan Hall	3 hours and 9 minutes, 3 challenges	Eliminated (Shift 1, Challenge 3)
Arturo Leighton	3 hours and 9 minutes, 3 challenges	Eliminated (Shift 1, Challenge 3)
Star Maye	3 hours and 9 minutes, 3 challenges	Eliminated (Shift 1, Challenge 3)
Marc Murphy	3 hours and 9 minutes, 3 challenges	Eliminated (Shift 1, Challenge 3)
Zuri Resendiz	3 hours and 9 minutes, 3 challenges	Eliminated (Shift 1, Challenge 3)
Ashleigh Shanti	3 hours and 9 minutes, 3 challenges	Eliminated (Shift 1, Challenge 3)
Dara Yu	3 hours and 9 minutes, 3 challenges	Eliminated (Shift 1, Challenge 3)
Michele Ragussis	1 hours and 8 minutes, 1 challenge	Eliminated (Shift 1, Challenge 1)

== Guest Judges ==
- Antonia Lofaso - Shift 1 and Shift 8
- Graham Elliot - Shift 2 and Shift 8
- Jet Tila - Shift 3 and Shift 8
- Fariyal Abdullahi - Shift 4
- Brooke Williamson - Shift 5
- Brian Malarkey and Carlos Anthony - Shift 6
- Andrew Zimmern - Shift 7

== Elimination chart ==
No.	Shift	1			2		3			4		5		6		7		8
No.	Challenge Winner(s)	Brittanny			Jonathon		Elia			Jonathon		Gabe		Bryan, Jonathon, Kathleen, Kelsey		Bryan		None
1	Jonathon	Ptc.	8th	Top 13	N/A	1st/$2400	Top 4	N/A	N/A	Last	1st	Chosen	N/A	Winner/$2400	N/A	N/A	3rd	Winner
2	Bryan	Ptc.	5th	Top 13	N/A	Safe	Bottom 7	Top 4	N/A	Safe	Safe	1st	N/A	Winner/$2400	N/A	2nd	1st	Runner-Up
3-4	Stephanie	Ptc.	2nd/Imm.	Top 13	1st	Safe	Bottom 7	Top 4	N/A	Safe	Safe		Safe	Bottom 4	Top 2	N/A	2nd	Eliminated(23 hours)
3-4	Nini	Ptc.	9th	Top 13	N/A	Safe	Top 4	N/A	N/A	Safe	Safe		Safe	Bottom 4	Top 2	N/A	4th	Eliminated(23 hours)
5	Kevin	1st	WIN/Imm.	Top 13	N/A	Safe	Bottom 7	Bottom 3	Safe	Safe	Safe		Safe	Bottom 4	Bottom 2	1st	5th	Eliminated (21 hours and 41 minutes)
6–7	Kathleen	Ptc.	23rd	Top 13	N/A	Safe	Top 4	N/A	N/A	Safe	Bottom 2	Chosen	N/A	Winner/$2400	N/A	N/A	Elim	Eliminated (20 hours and 20 minutes)
6–7	Kelsey	Ptc.	14th	Top 13	N/A	Safe	Bottom 7	Top 4	N/A	Safe	Safe	Chosen	N/A	Winner/$2400	N/A	N/A	Elim	Eliminated (20 hours and 20 minutes)
8	Gabe	Ptc.	16th	Top 13	N/A	Safe	Top 4	N/A	N/A	Safe	Safe		Winner/$2400	Bottom 4	Bottom 2	Elim	Eliminated (19 hours and 2 minutes)	
9	Elia	Ptc.	20th	Top 13	N/A	Safe	Bottom 7	Winner	N/A	1st/$2400	Safe		Elim	Eliminated (19 hours and 2 minutes)				
10	Damaris	Ptc.	12th	Top 13	N/A	Bottom 3	Bottom 7	Bottom 3	Top 1	Safe	Elim	Eliminated (12 hours and 28 minutes)						
11	Brittanny	Ptc.	19th	Top 13/$2400	N/A	Bottom 3	Bottom 7	Bottom 3	Elim	Eliminated (8 hours and 56 minutes)								
12	Laurence	Ptc.	7th	Top 13	N/A	Elim	Eliminated (6 hours and 59 minutes)											
13	LT	Ptc.	3rd/Imm.	Top 13	Elim	Eliminated (4 hours and 28 minutes)												
14-23	Samantha	Ptc.	6th	Elim	Eliminated (3 hours and 9 minutes)													
14-23	Leslie	Ptc.	13th	Elim	Eliminated (3 hours and 9 minutes)													
14-23	Richie	Ptc.	10th	Elim	Eliminated (3 hours and 9 minutes)													
14-23	Ilan	Ptc.	11th	Elim	Eliminated (3 hours and 9 minutes)													
14-23	Arturo	Ptc.	15th	Elim	Eliminated (3 hours and 9 minutes)													
14-23	Star	Ptc.	21st	Elim	Eliminated (3 hours and 9 minutes)													
14-23	Marc	Ptc.	4th	Elim	Eliminated (3 hours and 9 minutes)													
14-23	Zuri	Ptc.	18th	Elim	Eliminated (3 hours and 9 minutes)													
14-23	Ashleigh	Ptc.	22nd	Elim	Eliminated (3 hours and 9 minutes)													
14-23	Dara	Ptc.	17th	Elim	Eliminated (3 hours and 9 minutes)													
24	Michele	Sel.	Elim	Eliminated (1 hour and 8 minutes)														

== Challenges ==
=== Shift 1: Speed ===
- Challenge #1: The first challenge saw the 24 chefs whisk eight egg whites, tournee eight potatoes, and juice enough lemons to fill an 8-ounce glass. The chef who completed these tasks in the shortest time earned the right to challenge one other chef to a head-to-head cook-off, with the loser being eliminated and the winner going to the breakroom until the start of Shift 2.

Winner: Kevin Lee
Eliminated: Michele Ragussis

- Challenge #2: The chefs continue their speed prep test. As each chef finishes, they choose an open spot at one of 11 two-person stations. Ten of these are arranged into five pairs, each with a different assigned protein, while the last one allows its occupants to go to the breakroom for the rest of the shift.
- Challenge #3: The chefs must create a dish using the protein at their station and the three ingredients from the prep challenge. One chef per protein has a red cutting board, and must decide whether to compete against their station-mate or team up with them to face the pair with the same protein.

Chicken: Jonathon vs Star; Damaris vs Ashleigh
Shellfish: Nini & Gabe vs Richie & Ilan
Pork: Laurence vs Arturo; Kelsey vs Dara
Lamb: Marc vs Kathleen; Brittanny vs Zuri
Fish: Bryan & Elia vs Samantha & Leslie

=== Shift 2: Simplicity ===
- Challenge #4: The two chefs, LT Smith and Stephanie Izard, that chose the breakroom instead of a protein in Challenge #2 (subsequently letting them sit out of Challenge #3) must cook head to head making a fancy peanut butter & jelly lunch, using peanut butter, jelly, bread, and three ingredients of their choosing.

Winner: Stephanie (Green apple, onion, cheddar cheese)
Eliminated: LT (Miso, anchovies, gem lettuce)

- Challenge #5: The chefs must determine ingredients in a pasta dish by taste only. The amount of correct ingredients they identify determines the amount of ingredients they get to cook with in the next challenge.
  7 ingredients: arugula, basil, garlic, sun-dried tomatoes, lemon, pistachios, Parmesan
- Challenge #6: The chefs must cook their best noodle dish using the number of ingredients they earned in the last round.

5 ingredients: Nini, Kathleen, Kelsey
4 ingredients: Britanny,
3 ingredients: Laurence, Damaris, Bryan, Kevin*, Jonathon, Stephanie*
2 ingredients: Gabe, Elia
*As the holder of the Golden Knife for this challenge, Stephanie gained the advantage to add an ingredient to her count and take one away from another chef.
Golden Knife Winner: Jonathon
Eliminated: Laurence

=== Shift 3: Resourcefulness ===
Golden Knife Winner Jonathon was selected to choose 6 ingredients out of 10 to incorporate into a 60-minute fine dining challenge that required the chefs to plate an appetizer (by 20 minutes), main course (by 40 minutes), and dessert (by 60 minutes). He chose carrot tops, strawberry milk, dried scallops, shell-on pistachios, pimento cheese, and Carolina Reaper peppers. Chef Jet Tila was the judge for this episode. The top 4 chefs for challenge 7 and 8 were allowed to sit out the next course(s).

Ingredients: carrot tops, bitter melon, cocktail weenies, truffle oil, dried scallops, Carolina Reaper peppers, fermented black beans, shell on pistachios, pimento cheese, strawberry milk

- Challenge #7: Appetizer

Appetizer Top 4: Kathleen, Jonathon, Gabe, and Nini

- Challenge #8: Main Course

Main course Top 4: Kelsey, Elia, Stephanie, Bryan

- Challenge #9: Dessert

Dessert Top 2: Kevin, Damaris
Eliminated: Britanny
Golden Knife Winner: Elia

=== Shift 4: Artistry ===
- Challenge #10: This challenge was to create a beautiful work-of-art with produce in 10 minutes.

Golden Knife Winner: Elia
Least beautiful plate: Jonathon (loses 5 minutes in the next challenge)

- Challenge #11: The chefs must take inspiration from well-known works of art and will be graded out of 50 visually. Elia advantage as the Golden Knife Winner was to choose her work of art and to distribute the rest of the paintings. She chose Water Lilies by Monet.
- Challenge #12: The chefs must take inspiration from well-known works of art and will be graded out of 50 based on taste.

Golden Knife Winner: Jonathon (Score of 90)
Bottom 2: Kathleen (Score of 78) and Damaris
Eliminated: Damaris (Score of 70)

=== Shift 5: Adaptability ===
- Challenge #13: This challenge was to create the best dessert with ice cream and items from the break room and items on their station within a 20-minute time frame.

Golden Knife Winner: Bryan (with tiramisu)
Three competitors chosen to join Bryan in the break room and go straight to Shift 6: Jonathon, Kelsey, Kathleen

- Challenge #14: Competitors must shop for 2 minutes to cook a lumberjack breakfast. Then, host Michael told the competitors that they should turn these ingredients into a five-star entrée.
- Challenge #15: The competitors must cook without gas.

Winner + $2400: Gabe
Eliminated: Elia

=== Shift 6: Teamwork ===
- Challenge #16: The competitors were split in groups of 4 to make a soup and sandwich combo in 28 minutes. One team had Bryan as captain with Jonathon, Kathleen, and Kelsey as members. Bryan chose Gabe has the captain of the other team with Nini, Stephanie, and Kevin as members.

Winner: Bryan, Jonathon, Kathleen, Kelsey - Each team member won $2400 and moved onto Shift 7.

- Challenge #17: As the Golden Knife winner, Bryan had to divide the losing team into two teams. He chose to ask the losing team to draw for their teams. Team 1 was Kevin and Gabe while team 2 was Stephanie and Nini. The challenge was to make 3 hors d'oeuvres - fried, cheesy, and sweet.

Fried Winner: Nini and Stephanie
Cheesy Winner: Gabe and Kevin
Sweet Winner: Nini and Stephanie

=== Shift 7: Risk Taking ===
- Challenge #18: This challenge was to create a spicy street food dish in 30 minutes. Bryan was given the choice to choose a 3rd chef to go against Kevin and Gabe. Bryan picked himself; if he won, he would receive $10,000 and automatically advance to the final shift. Whoever comes in last would be eliminated.

Winner: Kevin
Eliminated: Gabe

- Challenge #19: This challenge was to make a finale-worthy fish dish, with a base time of 20 minutes. The competitors only have whole fish to work with. Five competitors were to make it to the finale, and two competitors were to be eliminated.
- Challenge #20: Each chef must wager 1–10 minutes on a trivia question before starting challenge #19 above. A correct answer adds the wager to the chef's time, while a miss deducts it. Jonathon, Stephanie, Kelsey, and Nini answered correctly.

Winner: Bryan (18 mins)
2nd Place: Stephanie (22 mins)
3rd Place: Jonathon (22 mins)
4th Place: Nini (30 mins)
5th Place: Kevin (10 mins)
Eliminated: Kathleen (18 mins), Kelsey (30 mins)

=== Shift 8: Elevate ===
- Challenge #21: The last 5 contestants will redo Challenge #1, but they only need to whisk five egg whites, tournée five potatoes, and juice enough lemons to fill a 5-ounce glass. The winner will get The Golden Knife.

Golden Knife Winner: Kevin

Golden Knife Advantage: For winning the Golden Knife, Kevin gets to decide which type of protein each chef will have to work with in Challenge #22, and the style of dish that every chef needs to prepare in the next challenge, as follows:

Kevin: Shellfish
Nini: Lamb
Stephanie: Pork
Bryan: Chicken
Jonathon: Beef
Style Of Dish In The Next Challenge: Classic Breakfast.

- Challenge #22: Each chef must do an elevated Classic Breakfast in 24 Minutes.

The version of the protein that each chef used in this challenge is as follows:

Nini: Ground Lamb
Kevin: Lobster
Jonathon: Hanger Steak
Stephanie: Iberico Presa
Bryan: Chicken Thighs

The dishes will then be ranked. The chef with the lowest-ranked dish will be eliminated. The ranks are as follows:

1st (Golden Knife Winner): Bryan
2nd: Stephanie
3rd: Jonathon
4th : Nini
Eliminated: Kevin

Golden Knife Advantage: Just like Kevin in the previous challenge, as the winner of the challenge, Bryan gets to decide which type of protein each chef will have to work with in the next challenge, and the style of dish that every chef needs to prepare in the next challenge, as follows:

Nini: Lamb
Stephanie: Pork
Bryan: Chicken
Jonathon: Beef
Style Of Dish In The Next Challenge: Fusion Lunch.

- Challenge #23: Each chef must do an elevated Fusion Lunch in 24 Minutes.

The version of the protein that each chef used in this challenge is as follows:

Nini: Lamb Shoulder
Stephanie: Pork Chops
Bryan: Chicken Wings
Jonathon: Japanese Wagyu Steak

Once again, the dishes will then be ranked. The 2 chefs with the lowest-ranked dish will be eliminated. The ranks are as follows:

Winner: Jonathon
2nd: Bryan
Eliminated: Nini and Stephanie

- Challenge #24: For the final challenge, Jonathon and Bryan can pick from any version of any type of protein (Lamb, Beef, Chicken, Shellfish, and Pork) that haven't been used in the previous 2 challenges to cook their final dish. The version of the protein that each chef used in the final challenge is as follows:

Jonathon: Rack Of Lamb
Bryan: Blue Foot Chicken

After picking their proteins, Jonathon and Bryan will use the rest of their time until the clock reaches 24 hours to make an elevated Modern Dinner.

Winner: Jonathon
Runner-Up: Bryan
