= Ayesha Nurdjaja =

American chef

- Nurdjaja in 2026
- Born: Brooklyn, N.Y
- Culinary career
- Current restaurants
- Shuka; Shukette
- Previous restaurants
- Il Bordelo; Red Gravy
- Television shows
- Bobby's Triple Threat; Beat Bobby Flay; Chopped; The Kitchen

Ayesha Nurdjaja is an American chef. She is the executive chef of both Shuka in SoHo and Shukette in Chelsea, Manhattan. Nurdjaja is currently one of the "Titans" on the TV show Bobby's Triple Threat on Food Network. She has made multiple appearances on other Food Network shows, the Today Show, and Vice Munchies. She has been featured as executive chef in The New York Times "Top 100 Restaurants in New York City" list twice, once in 2023 and again in 2024. Nurdjaja was also a finalist nominee for the James Beard Foundation Award "Best Chef: New York State" in 2022.

== Biography ==
Nurdjaja is from Gravesend, Brooklyn, born 1 November; she has an Italian mother and Indonesian father, who was a chef. She began pursuing cooking as a career while getting a business degree at Pace University; after receiving her BA in 2000, she attended law school and began a job at a law firm. While at the firm, Nurdjaja attended the Institute of Culinary Education, graduating in 2006.

After seeing Lidia Bastianich cook on PBS, Nurdjaja did an externship at her restaurant Felidia, where she was hired and eventually promoted to sous-chef. She later worked at Bar Artisanal and Picholine, with Chef Terrance Brennan, and A Voce, under fellow Missy Robbins. She also served as the executive chef at the now-defunct Il Bordello and Red Gravy. In 2015, Nurdjaja joined Vicki Freeman and Marc Meyer at the restaurant Hundred Acres. The three collaborated to replace the location with Shuka, a Middle Eastern restaurant, which opened in September 2017; Nurdjaja is its executive chef. She originally intended to open a sister restaurant, Shukette, in 2019 or 2020, but it was delayed until opening in July 2021.

Her first television appearance on Food Network was on the third episode of the second season of Chopped in 2009, where she was eliminated after the entrée challenge. Around 15 years later, chef Bobby Flay invited her to become a "Titan" on Bobby's Triple Threat, which she eventually accepted, replacing Tiffany Derry in 2025 and working alongside Brooke Williamson and Michael Voltaggio. She also has served as a judge on Beat Bobby Flay and Chopped, and was a guest on The Kitchen and a challenger on Wildcard Kitchen.

Nurdjaja was a 2022 James Beard Foundation Award finalist (Best Chef: New York State), and a semifinalist in 2023 and 2026. She was also on Food Network's Hot List for 2025, and received the 2025 International Association of Culinary Professionals Trailblazer Award. Her first cookbook, Mediterranean All The Way, was published by Penguin Random House on October 20, 2026.
