= Stephanie Izard =

American chef

- Born: Evanston, Illinois, U.S.
- Education: University of Michigan; Scottsdale Culinary Institute
- Culinary career
- Current restaurant(s): Girl & the Goat Little Goat Diner Duck Duck Goat Cabra Girl & the Goat L.A. Cabra L.A. Valley Goat
- Television show(s): Top Chef Iron Chef Gauntlet Iron Chef America 24 in 24: Last Chef Standing

Stephanie Izard is an American chef and television personality best known as the first female chef to win Bravo's Top Chef, taking the title during its fourth season. She is the co-owner and executive chef of three award-winning Chicago restaurants, Girl and the Goat, Little Goat, and Duck Duck Goat, and opened her first restaurant, Scylla (now closed) as chef-owner at the age of 27. Valley Goat is the newest iteration, in Sunnyvale, California. Izard received a James Beard Foundation Award for "Best Chef: Great Lakes" in 2013 for her work at Girl and the Goat. She has made a number of appearances on Top Chef since her win, both as a guest judge on subsequent seasons and as a participant in Top Chef Duels. In 2017, Izard competed in the Food Network series Iron Chef Gauntlet, where she overall defeated chefs Bobby Flay, Michael Symon, and Masaharu Morimoto to obtain the title of Iron Chef.

== Early life and education ==
Stephanie Izard was born in the Chicago suburb of Evanston, Illinois and grew up in Stamford, Connecticut, where she developed an interest in food from her parents. She earned a degree in sociology from the University of Michigan in 1998 before attending the Le Cordon Bleu College of Culinary Arts Scottsdale, graduating in 1999.

== Career ==
After graduating with a culinary arts degree, Izard worked in the Phoenix, Arizona area at the Camelback Inn Resort & Spa and Christopher Gross's Fermier Brasserie. Izard returned to the Chicago area in 2001, with a job as garde manger at Jean-Georges Vongerichten's Vong. While working at Vong, Izard met future Top Chef contestant Dale Talde and Heather Shouse, with whom she would later co-author the cookbook Girl in the Kitchen: How a Top Chef Cooks, Thinks, Shops, Eats, and Drinks.

After leaving Vong, Izard worked as tournant at Shawn McClain's Spring, and then as sous chef at Dale Levitski's La Tache.

=== Restaurants ===
In 2004, at 27, Izard opened her first restaurant, Scylla, in the Bucktown neighborhood of Chicago. The 50-seat restaurant, named for the Greek mythological creature Scylla, offered a menu emphasizing seafood and a sweet-savory interplay with dishes like lobster-stuffed profiteroles and grouper with sweet corn risotto and lobster sauce Reviews and awards included three stars from the Chicago Tribune, "Best New Restaurants 2005" from Chicago Magazine, and "Ten Best Small U.S. Restaurants" from Bon Appétit. Izard closed Scylla in August 2007.

In the wake of her Top Chef win, Izard met future business partners Kevin Boehm and Rob Katz of the BOKA Restaurant Group, and the trio eventually opened Girl & the Goat in Chicago's West Loop in the summer of 2010. The 130-seat restaurant features an eclectic menu showcasing Mediterranean influences and "nose-to-tail" cooking, emphasizing the use of offal alongside traditional cuts of meat.

Saveur magazine dubbed Girl & the Goat "America’s Best New Restaurant" in their first-ever restaurant review. Girl & the Goat was nominated for the James Beard Award (Best New Restaurant) in 2011, the same year that Food & Wine magazine named Izard, a "Best New Chef."

In March 2011, Izard announced that she would be teaming up with the BOKA restaurant group to open a second restaurant, Little Goat. Little Goat was an opportunity for Izard to expand the Girl & the Goat's burgeoning bread program. The restaurant offers upscale diner food and an all-day breakfast.

In February 2015, Izard announced the opening of a third restaurant in Chicago's Fulton-Randolph Market District, called Duck Duck Goat.

In July 2021, Izard opened her second Girl & the Goat location in Los Angeles, the first of her restaurants outside Chicago.

In April 2023, Little Goat moved from the West Loop to Lake View, hoping to stick more closely to a traditional diner format. Izard plans to potentially open a speakeasy-styled bar attached to the restaurant in the future.

Valley Goat opened in March 2025 at Treehouse Hotel Silicon Valley in Sunnyvale, California.

=== Television ===
==== Top Chef ====
Around the time of Scylla's closing, Izard signed on to the Chicago-based fourth season of Bravo's Top Chef, which she ultimately won, becoming the show's first female winner and claiming a $100,000 prize. Throughout the season, Izard won two "Quickfire" challenges and five elimination challenges and was on the top eleven out of fourteen episodes. In the Puerto Rico-based finale, she chose Eric Ripert to assist with her prep work in preparing a four-course tasting menu for judging, which prevailed over the menus offered by fellow contestants Richard Blais and Lisa Fernandes.

On the Top Chef Season 4 Reunion Special, Izard won the "Fan Favorite," receiving a $10,000 prize in addition to her Top Chef title and prizes. Until Kelsey Barnard Clark of season 16 and Melissa King of season 17, she was the only Top Chef winner also to win Fan Favorite.

==== Other appearances ====
In April 2012, Stephanie Izard was featured in an episode of Hulu's A Day in the Life TV series. The episode followed Izard for an entire day while she worked at her restaurant. About halfway through the episode, there is a planning meeting to discuss the development of Izard's new restaurant, Little Goat.

Izard also appeared on Food Network's Iron Chef America, where she competed against, and ultimately lost to, Iron Chef Michael Symon in a head-to-head bread competition. In 2017, in the first season of Iron Chef Gauntlet, she won through the final round and defeated Iron Chefs Bobby Flay, Masaharu Morimoto, and Michael Symon, earning the title Iron Chef in the process.

In April 2024, Izard was a guest judge in the first season of the Food Network show 24 in 24: Last Chef Standing. She returned as a contestant in the second season in April 2025, finishing in third place.

Chef Izard is occasionally seen on Guy's Grocery Games, either as a judge or as a competing chef. She has also been featured as a guest judge on Hell's Kitchen in the twenty-first, twenty-third, and twenty-fourth seasons.

=== Other projects ===
In October 2011, Izard published her first cookbook, Girl in the Kitchen. Following its release, Izard and her team went on a national "Goat Tour" to promote the book. While in each city on tour, Izard teamed up with a chef friend in town to co-host a collaboration dinner to benefit Share Our Strength, an organization dedicated to feeding hungry children, of which Izard has been a supporter.

In 2016, Izard launched This Little Goat, a line of bottled sauces and spice mixes inspired by international cuisines.

In 2023, she was one of the chefs who cooked for World Central Kitchen's Feeding Hope dinner in Los Angeles.

Izard currently resides in Los Angeles with her son, Ernie (born in 2016).Chef Izard references being a single mom on shows, but no confirmation of a divorce has been made.

== Awards, nominations and accolades ==
- 2013 James Beard Foundation Award "Best Chef: Great Lakes" Winner
- 2012 James Beard Foundation Award "Best Chef: Great Lakes" Nominee
- Listed as one of the "Top 10 Chefs to Follow on Twitter" by Bon Appétit Magazine
