= Wildlife WayStation =

Former animal sanctuary in Los Angeles County, California

- Interactive map of Wildlife WayStation
- 34°19′53″N 118°20′40″W
- Date opened: 1976
- Date closed: 2019
- Location: Angeles National Forest, Los Angeles County, United States
- Land area: 160 acres (65 ha)
- No. of animals: 400
- Website: www.wildlifewaystation.org

The Wildlife WayStation was a 160-acre animal sanctuary (65 ha) in Sylmar, California in northern Los Angeles County dedicated to rescuing and rehabilitating wild and exotic animals. A charitable corporation located within the boundaries of Angeles National Forest, the facility was founded in 1976 by animal activist Martine Colette, who resigned in May 2019 as president and chief operating officer.

== History ==
Martine Colette came to Hollywood in 1965 and built a costume design business. She founded the Wildlife WayStation in 1976 as she saw the need for a refuge for wild and exotic animals. In addition to large animals such as big cats and bears, it at one time housed the largest group of chimpanzees in the Western United States. Although the intent was to rehabilitate the animals, many remained for the rest of their lives.

A distemper epidemic in 1992 closed the sanctuary for almost a year. The sanctuary had been treating a large number of raccoons and skunks with canine distemper, which crossed over to the big cats. 18 big cats died in this epidemic.

In September 1995, the Waystation was contacted after some big cats escaped from Ligertown in Lava Hot Springs, Idaho. They rescued 27 lions and ligers from "filthy, feces-filled tunnels and pens," many of them in poor health and ranging from cubs to full-grown adults, but 19 others were killed by authorities in the roundup. The rescued animals were taken to the Waystation and cared for. The owners of Ligertown were charged with cruelty to animals.

The Wildlife WayStation was seeking to move from its mountain location, possibly to the northern edge of Palm Springs, in 2007. It was looking to create an 80-acre facility (32 ha) outside the Angeles National Forest and downsize the original location to about 20 acres (8.1 ha). Suzanne Somers was said to have been considering donating the land.

In August 2009, a forest fire in the Angeles National Forest threatened the facility, and many of the animals were evacuated. In May 2016 numerous employees and volunteers were fired. In December 2017, the Creek Fire burned part of the facility, and animals were evacuated.

State officials announced in 2019 that the facility had surrendered its state permits. The California Department of Fish and Wildlife took charge of the facility and responsibility for finding acceptable new homes for the animals. The use of chimps in research ended in 2015, making it difficult to find room for those in the refuge. They were the last animals left when they were able to move to Chimp Haven in Louisiana.

After 2019, the total number of wildlife rehabilitation facilities in Southern California decreased. Changes to the regulations were expected to bring a new era of professionalism to the possession of native animals for rehabilitation purposes.

== Animals ==
The Wildlife WayStation housed about 400 wild and exotic animals, including lions, tigers, leopards, mountain lions, jaguars, bobcats, bears, primates, deer, coyotes, and wolves. Many animals in the facility were the property of people who found they were unwilling or unable to continue to keep their so-called exotic pets and either abandoned the animals, which were later found and rescued by Colette and the staff or surrendered them to the WayStation, escaping further responsibility for the animals. The animals often arrived at the WayStation in poor health and were cared for by veterinarians.

== In popular culture ==
Martine Colette AKA Martine Dawson appeared as herself in the Samuel Fuller movie White Dog. Part of the film was shot on the premises.

The Wildlife WayStation was the focus of the first episode "Walk on the Wild Side" of Marcel's Quantum Kitchen on the SyFy channel.

Martine Colette appeared as herself in S10E6 of Storage Wars (“I Learned it From Watching You!") on April 26th, 2017. She appraised the value of a vintage bear trap after the seller confirmed that he would only be offering it to collectors. While onscreen, she mentioned that the refuge was mainly funded by generous visitors and donors.
