= Le Cordon Bleu College of Culinary Arts Scottsdale =

Vocational school in Arizona

Coordinates: 33°30′10″N 111°54′23″W

Le Cordon Bleu College of Culinary Arts- Scottsdale
- Type: Private, for-profit
- Active: 1986; 40 years ago – 2017; 9 years ago
- President: Jacob C. Elsen
- Executive Chef: JonPaul Hutchins
- Location: Scottsdale, Arizona, USA
- Website: http://www.chefs.edu/

Le Cordon Bleu College of Culinary Arts- Scottsdale formerly Scottsdale Culinary Institute (SCI) was a career-focused school in Arizona specializing in culinary and hospitality education. Elizabeth Sherman Leite started Scottsdale Culinary Institute in 1986. The college is owned by Career Education Corporation under a licensing agreement with Le Cordon Bleu in Paris. The institute was located in a former country club on a golf course and lakefront overlooking Camelback Mountain. It closed in 2017.

== History ==
The school, generally known as the Scottsdale Culinary Institute was one of the largest culinary programs in the area. It was founded by Elizabeth Leite in 1986 and under Jon-Paul Hutchins, more than one hundred thousand students went through the program in twenty five years and earned associates or bachelor's degrees. It closed in 2017 along with the remaining Cordon Bleu schools in the United States.

== Notable faculty and alumni ==
- Kevin Binkley, James Beard winner
- Stephanie Izard, winner of Top Chef, Season 4
- Bernie Kantak
- Fife Symington, former governor of Arizona
