= Marcel's Quantum Kitchen =

- Starring: Marcel Vigneron
- Country of origin: United States
- Original language: English
- No. of seasons: 1
- No. of episodes: 6

Production
- Executive producers: Michael Agbabian; Dana Leiken; Andrew Scheer; Dwight D. Smith
- Production locations: Hollywood; Los Angeles
- Editors: Kabir Akhtar; Mark Bement; Amiee Durrant; Kevin Finn; Jason Groothuis; David Harris; Mark Edward Hornish; Mike Rysavy; Ian Spencer
- Running time: 60 minutes
- Production company: Mission Control Media

Original release
- Network: Syfy
- Release: March 22 – April 26, 2011

Marcel's Quantum Kitchen is an American television program broadcast by the Syfy channel. The first episode premiered on March 22, 2011, at 10 pm EST. The series follows Marcel Vigneron of Top Chef fame in his new molecular gastronomy catering company, where each episode features the development of unique dishes for a client's event and the event itself. In the creation of dishes, Vigneron draws inspiration from the client and the purpose of the event which has resulted in dishes such as a hash brown bird's nest with tomato foam egg and liquor-filled bonbon engagement rings in a passionfruit marshmallow pillow box. Due to low ratings, the show was cancelled after 6 episodes.

== Team ==
- Marcel Vigneron - Executive chef and molecular gastronomist.
- Jarrid Masse - Sous chef and fabricator for Vigneron's serving displays.
- Devon Espinosa - Sous chef and mixologist; friend of Marcel's from culinary school.
- Robyn Wilson - Prep cook with experience in the catering industry.
- Sally Camacho - (additional member called in for complex desserts) Pastry chef specializing in chocolate and sugar works, wedding cakes, bonbons, and plate desserts.
- Katsuya Fukushima - (additional member called in for extra help) Chef and protégé of José Andrés, as well as Marcel's friend. Specializing in avant-garde cooking techniques.

== Episodes ==
No.	Title	Event	Client	Original release date	Viewers (millions)	HH rating
1	"Walk on the Wild Side"	Wildlife Waystation; Safari Dinner Party	Carlton (Los Angeles Philanthropist)	March 22, 2011	0.602	0.4
Dishes: Edible Map made out of fruit leather, Snakes in the Grass (snake skin made with pork rinds, and edible tree made with pulled short ribs fused to a beef tenderloin), Bird's Eye Surprise (fried hash browns next with tomato foam egg including poached yellow cherry tomato as egg yolk), Tiger's Breath (puffed caramel wild rice tablets salt sugar coconut milk powder in liquid nitrogen).
2	"Rules of Engagement"	Engagement Party	High School Sweethearts	March 29, 2011	0.610	0.4
Dishes: Hearts of Palm Salad, 30-inch Wine Noodles, Three-Tiered Surf & Turf (1st tier: Heart-Beet Ravioli, 2nd tier: Fois Gras Jus over Spot Prawn Ravioli, 3rd tier: Sous-vide Flat Iron Steak and Alaskan King Crab with pinot noir veil), Edible Diamond Rings (liquor-filled bonbon engagement rings in a passionfruit marshmallow pillow box)
3	"All Revved Up"	Clothing-Line Launch Party	Yaniv Evan of Power Plant Motorcycle Company	April 5, 2011	0.483	0.3
Dishes: Ginger Root Beer Float with whiskey and a beer sphere, Mac 'n Chains (cheddar cheese noodles with cheese foam and croutons), Animal-style Fries (potatoes, and beef tongue with "beefonaise" sauce), Chicken Fried Steak with chicken skin wrapping and BBQ sauce squeeze shooter, S'mores with marshmallow "hot" ice cream.
4	"Sink or Swim"	Surfing Luau	Steve Walden of Walden Surf Co. (surfboard maker)	April 12, 2011	0.470	?
Dishes: Walden Surfboard-shaped Taro Chips with Spam Puree (poi), Tuna Shaved Ice Poke/Tartare on Edible Opihi Shell-shaped crackers with ponzu fluid gel, Lomi Lomi Amadai (tomato concasse, and scallion fluid gel), Pork Short Ribs on Hot Rocks (served tableside with shoyu and pineapple sauce and duo of Maui onions: fried & puree) accompanied by active "sauce volcanoes" (which failed to operate), "Fauxconut" - coconut cream and chocolate sponge cake with macadamia "soil" dusted on top, coconut fluid gel and hazelnut praline.
5	"The Heat Is On"	L.A. Firemen's Relief Association Dinner (Engine No. 27)	Los Angeles Fire Department Museum	April 19, 2011	0.562	0.3
Dishes: Langoustine Cocktail under celery salad with three types of cocktail sauce (cocktail caviar, cocktail powder, and cocktail foam), Four Alarm Chili - a deconstructed chili under beans and carrots, oxtail and ham hocks stuffed inside a meatball chili croquette, with a "heat tester" of four chili gel cubes (4 alarms of chilies: Alarm 1: Mild - yellow bell peppers, Alarm 2: Hot - green Serrano chilies, Alarm 3: Hotter - red Thai bird's eye chilies, and Alarm 4: Hottest - orange habaneros) with a milk & honey "cool-down" in a mini faux fire extinguisher, Apple Smoked Baby Back Ribs (apple butter gelatin bones, apple chips, popcorn, and black trumpet mushrooms, infused with an apple smoke under a cloche), and Carrot Cake (cream cheese snow, blackberry and white chocolate ambers, cinnamon stick twigs, and carrot puree shaped flames with golden raisin caramel).
6	"Race to the Finish"	Chrysler College of Creative Studies/Future Designers Dinner	Chrysler Company (Walter P. Chrysler Museum) (Detroit)	April 26, 2011	0.331	0.3
Dishes: Deep Dish Pizza: air bread pizza with spicy pepperoni sauce and freeze-dried tomato topped with mozzarella sphere on opal basil served on a levitating hovercraft for a special delivery. Cryo-Seared Duck with Gnocchi: rendered muscovy duck breast with (calcium chloride) potato puree gnocchi, bing cherries, Brussels sprouts, and orange honey windshield. Full Spectrum Turbot: turbot fish, Italian cardoons, cippolini onions, sous-vide artichokes & crispy choke chips served under a plate filled with milk and food coloring causing a reaction from soap beads into a spectrum of colors. Chocolate Track & Tire: dark chocolate ganache tire with sugar crouquant wheel rims inspired by the Chrysler 200, cashew salt cookie crumble, creme fraiche snow, passion fruit vanilla cream, and stark caramel cremue gravel for the tire tracks.
