= Fariyal Abdullahi =

American chef

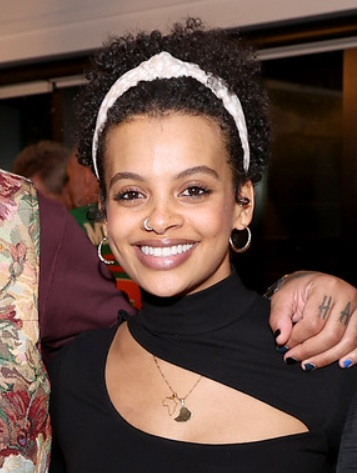
- Fariyal in 2023
- Born: 27 September 1986 (age 39); Addis Ababa, Ethiopia
- Education: Culinary Institute of America
- Occupations: Chef, restaurateur, and TV personality

Fariyal Abdullahi (born 27 September 1986) is an American chef, television personality, and restaurateur.

== Early life ==
Fariyal Abdullahi was born in Addis Ababa, Ethiopia. She is the youngest child to her parents. Fariyal states that her mother was the greatest cook and an inspiration. Later, when she was a teenager, she would relocate to the United States. Fariyal Abdullahi initially received a B.A. in Psychology at California State University, Long Beach before transitioning to culinary studies. She studied at the Culinary Institute of America and subsequently worked at Noma restaurant in Denmark.

== Career ==
In 2021 Fariyal was among the chefs who prepared meals for the Met Gala held in New York City. In 2025 she was nominated for the prestigious James Beard Foundation Award.

She is currently executive chef of Hav & Mar, a restaurant owned by Marcus Samuelsson in New York City.

== Television and other media ==
She is a regular on the Food Network appearing in Beat Bobby Flay, Supermarket Stakeout, Chopped & 24 in 24: Last Chef Standing series 2.

Fariyal has also appeared on CBS Mornings and ABC's Tamron Hall.

== Personal life ==
Abdullahi is of Harari background. Abdullahi is also Muslim.
