= Marcel Vigneron =

American chef

- Born: Wichita, Kansas
- Education: Culinary Institute of America
- Culinary career
- Cooking style: California
- Current restaurants
- Joël Robuchon (Las Vegas, Nevada) Wolf  (Los Angeles, California)  Lemon Grove (Los Angeles, California)
- Television shows
- Top Chef on Bravo Marcel's Quantum Kitchen on SyFy; The Next Iron Chef on Food Network; Cutthroat Kitchen on Food Network 24 in 24 on Food Network

Marcel Vigneron is an American chef. He was the winner of the first season of 24 in 24: Last Chef Standing in 2024, and he was the runner-up of the second season of Top Chef, which aired in 2006–2007. From 2011 on, he has made multiple other television appearances and has opened several hotels and restaurants in the Los Angeles area, such as The Bazaar at SLS Beverly Hills, Wolf, The Chateau Marmont, The Beverly Hilton, and Lemon Grove at The Aster. He is now the CEO & Executive Chef of his own event and production company, Modern California Cuisine.

== Early life ==
Vigneron is originally from Wichita, Kansas but moved to Los Angeles with his family at a young age and went to elementary school in Burbank, California. His family moved to Washington state in 1994 and he attended high school on Bainbridge Island.

Vigneron later went on to study at the Culinary Institute of America (CIA) in New York and achieved his associate degree in Culinary Arts as well as a bachelor's degree in Hospitality Management. There, Vigneron met fellow chef Spike Mendelsohn. The two played a lot of frisbee together and became best friends; they would later compete together on the 5th and 8th seasons of The Next Iron Chef. At the CIA, Vigneron enrolled in the teaching assistant program, where he served as the sous chef to Dwayne Lipuma at the school's Ristorante Caterina de’ Medici.

== Top Chef ==
Vigneron appeared in season two of Bravo's reality series Top Chef, which was filmed in 2006, and aired in late 2006 and early 2007. At the time of his appearance on Top Chef, he was a Master Cook at Joël Robuchon in Las Vegas, Nevada.

On the show, he became known for his molecular gastronomy techniques, especially his use of foams. He was assaulted on the show in an incident in which several of the show's contestants egged on contestant Cliff Crooks to pin down Vigneron while they all tried to shave his head. This led to Cliff being kicked off the show.

Several Top Chef viewers blogged about discrepancies in the sequence of events relating to the hair-shaving incident, including one clip that shows contestant Elia Aboumrad during the shave attempt with all of her hair intact, despite being shown shaving her head earlier in the sequence. Activity in the blogosphere eventually attracted the attention of entertainment news outlets, some of which commented that the creative editing was done in an attempt to downplay interpersonal conflicts. Vigneron characterized the event as more like a drunken assault, and confirmed that the attack on him came before the other contestants shaved their heads, contrary to how the footage was edited.

Vigneron made it to the finals, finishing as runner-up behind the winner Ilan Hall.

== Post-Top Chef ==
In 2008, he was an Executive Sous Chef at The Bazaar in the SLS Hotel in Beverly Hills, California.

In March 2010 it was announced that Vigneron would star in Marcel's Quantum Kitchen, a reality television show that aired on the Syfy cable network. In each episode, Marcel and his new catering and event company were hired by a demanding client to produce an extraordinary celebration or event. Marcel dreamed up a theme and cuisine for the event based on the client's requests. The show was a production of Mission Control Media with Executive Producers Michael Agbabian and Dwight Smith. The show lasted six episodes.

He returned to the Top Chef series in Top Chef: All-Stars. On the episode that aired on January 19, 2011, he was eliminated from the competition after the Restaurant Wars challenge. In April 2024, Vigneron won the first season of the Food Network show 24 in 24: Last Chef Standing, earning $50,000 cash and a trip to Hawaii valued at $24,000.

As of 2024, Vigneron serves as the executive chef and CEO of his own event production and catering company Modern California Cuisine.

== Personal life ==
As of 2024, Vigneron lives in the Malibu area. He is the owner of the restaurant Wolf on Melrose Ave. His most recent (as of 31 March 2026) restaurant, Beefsteak, opened in August 2016. Vigneron closed both restaurants in February 2019 to pursue catering.

He wed entrepreneur Lauren Rae Levy on November 9, 2019, in Santa Susana, California. They welcomed son Kingston in 2020.
