= Hav & Mar =

Restaurant in New York City

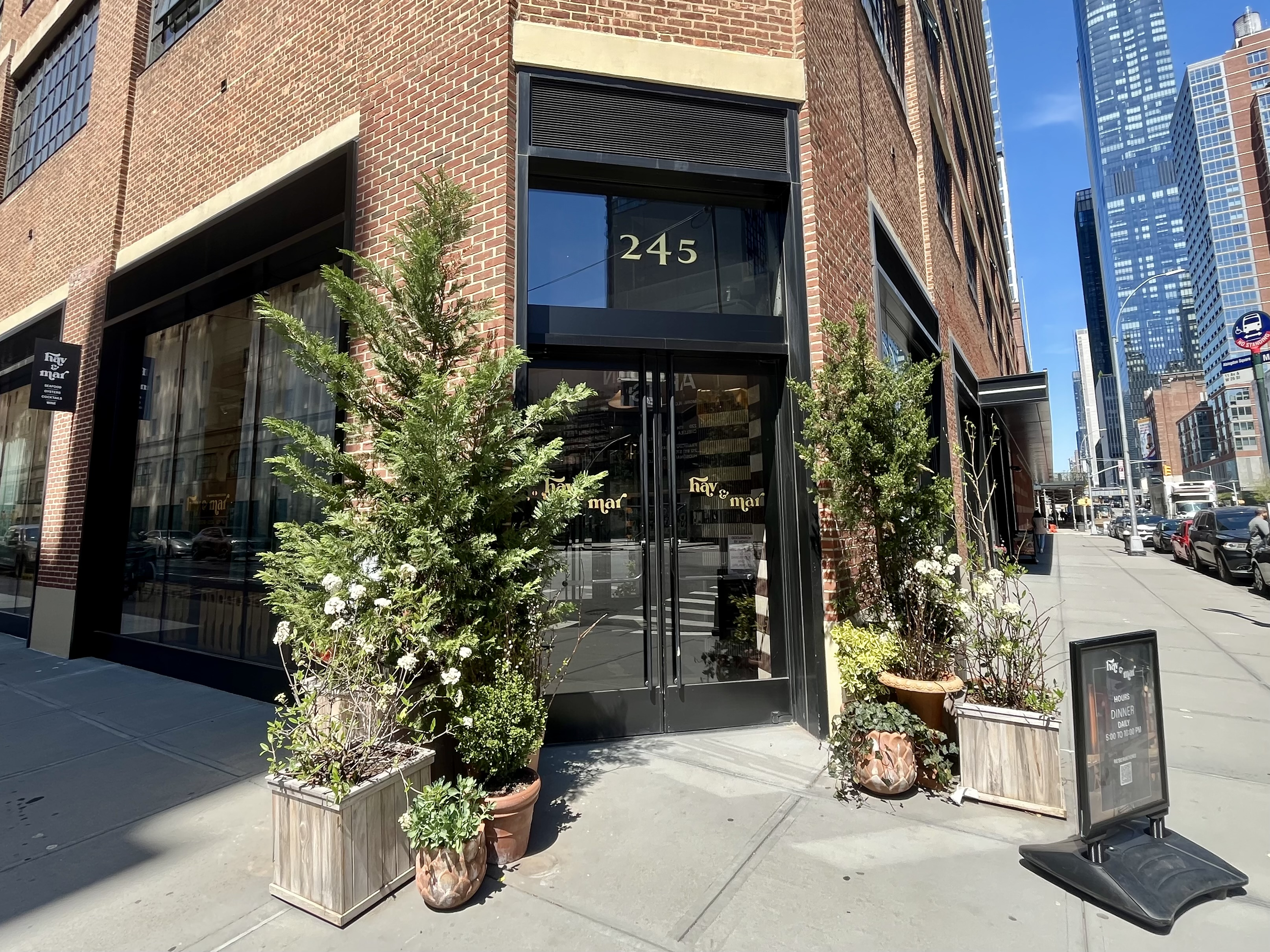
- The restaurant's exterior in April 2024
- Interactive map of Hav & Mar

Restaurant information
- Owner: Marcus Samuelsson
- Head chef: Fariyal Abdullahi
- Food type: Seafood with "Swediopian" or Swedish and Ethiopian influences
- Location: 245 Eleventh Avenue, New York City, New York, 10001, United States
- Coordinates: 40°45′04″N 74°00′21″W

Hav & Mar is a restaurant in Chelsea, New York City opened by Marcus Samuelsson. The food is described as "Swediopian," a mix of Swedish and Ethiopian primarily serving seafood. The restaurant opened in the Starrett–Lehigh Building in 2022. Its head chef is Fariyal Abdullahi.

== Reception ==
The New York Times included Hav & Mar in a list of the city's twelve best new restaurants in 2023.
