= Michael Voltaggio =

American celebrity chef (born 1978)

- Voltaggio in 2026
- Born: September 29, 1978 (age 48); Frederick, Maryland, U.S.
- Education: The Greenbrier Hotel Culinary Apprenticeship Program
- Spouse: Bria Vinaite (m. 2022)
- Culinary career
- Cooking style: Modern American
- Current restaurants
- Voltaggio Brothers Steakhouse, National Harbor, MD (2016-present)
- Previous restaurants
- ink., West Hollywood, CA (2011–2017), ink.sack, West Hollywood, CA (2011–2018), ink.well, Los Angeles, CA (2017–2018), STRFSH, Santa Monica, CA (2017–2021), Estuary, Washington D.C. (2019–2022), Thacher & Rye, Frederick, MD (2020–2024),

Michael Voltaggio (born September 29, 1978) is an American chef, restaurateur, and author. He is a Top Chef alum and the winner of season 6. His brother Bryan Voltaggio is also a celebrity chef. He resides in Los Angeles, California.

== Early life and early career ==
Voltaggio is one of three children born to parents Sharon and John Voltaggio. At age 5, his parents divorced and the children initially lived with their mother, and later moved to their father's house. Starting in childhood, brothers Michael and Bryan were very close.

Voltaggio did not have support or money to attend culinary school. Instead, he did a long apprenticeship in The Greenbrier's prestigious culinary apprenticeship program. Michael completed his Greenbrier apprenticeship under Certified Master Chef Peter Timmins at the age of 21. He later held jobs at the Ritz Carlton Hotel Naples, Florida under chef Peter Timmins and Charlie Palmer's Dry Creek Kitchen in Healdsburg. During his tenure as Chef de Cuisine at The Bazaar by Jose Andres, the restaurant was nominated for the James Beard Foundation Award for Best New Restaurant in 2008.

Voltaggio was the chef de cuisine at The Dining Room, Ritz Carlton (now Langham) Huntington Hotel & Spa in Pasadena, which received several culinary awards, including the AAA Five Diamond Award, the Mobil Five-Star Award, and a Michelin Star, one of the few held by restaurants in the US.

== Restaurants ==
Voltaggio left The Dining Room in 2010 and announced plans to open his own restaurant in West Hollywood, California, in a space owned by former Hollywood super agent Michael Ovitz. After several delays, the restaurant ink. opened on September 21, 2011. Voltaggio's goal with the restaurant was to create what he called "modern Los Angeles cuisine." The restaurant seated 60 people in the dining room with a private room that could accommodate an additional 10 guests. It was named "America's best new restaurant" by GQ Magazine in March 2012.

Voltaggio was quietly planning a smaller restaurant around the corner, a sandwich shop called ink.sack, while publicly developing and readying ink. Voltaggio designed and built the shop himself and surprised the culinary world when he opened the small restaurant with little notice or fanfare. From August 11, 2011, until 2018, he owned and ran the ink.sack, a sandwich shop which had two locations, including one on Melrose Avenue (in West Hollywood) and one on Sunset Boulevard.

Michael, along with brother Bryan, opened STRFSH, a fast-casual fish sandwich shop in Santa Monica, open from October 2017 to 2021. The Voltaggio brothers opened Estuary in Washington D.C., which operated under their leadership from 2019 until March 2022.

== Television appearances ==
Voltaggio was the winner of the sixth season of Top Chef, Bravo's cooking competition reality show, where he competed with his brother, Bryan Voltaggio. The two ended in the finale, alongside Kevin Gillespie, with Michael winning the contest. Top Chef judge Tom Colicchio said of Voltaggio, “Out of all the cooks that have come through the show, Michael is the most talented—both from a sensibility and technical standpoint. He has the chops to pull off what he’s trying to do.”

Voltaggio appeared in September 2010 on the finale of season seven of Top Chef and as a guest judge in Season 3 of Top Chef Canada. His sous-chef, Mei Lin, won Top Chef, season 12.

Voltaggio appeared twice on the American sitcom Young & Hungry as himself, in the 2014 pilot episode and in the episode "Young & Amnesia". He also made a cameo as chef Julio Proust on the sitcom Suburgatory in 2013. He has appeared as himself in a season 5 story arc in the TV series Lucifer.

Voltaggio competed against Bobby Flay on Iron Chef America in Battle Iberico. He has appeared on Tournament of Champions, competing against his brother, Bryan Voltaggio.

He was a guest judge in the Season 3 finale of Vice's Bong Appétit. On March 14, 2022, a new show started airing on the Food Network called The Julia Child Challenge, on which he's a judge along with Antonia Lofaso. He also periodically judges and competes on Guy's Grocery Games.

In 2022, Voltaggio was handpicked by Bobby Flay to be one of his three culinary Titans on Bobby's Triple Threat.

In April 2024, Voltaggio and his brother were guest judges in the first season of the Food Network show 24 in 24: Last Chef Standing.

In September 2025, Voltaggio appeared on Celebrity Family Feud on Bobby Flay's team.

In December 2025, Voltaggio and his brother competed as a team in the first season of the Food Network show Tournament of Champions: All-Star Christmas and won.

== Personal life ==
Voltaggio has three daughters; two with ex-wife Kerri Adams, and one with wife Bria Vinaite. The older two children reside in West Virginia with their mother.

From mid-2019 to mid-2021, Voltaggio was in a relationship with fashion designer and entrepreneur, Sami Miro. Voltaggio married actress Bria Vinaite on November 18, 2022, in Hawai'i.

In 2023, he was one of the chefs who cooked for World Central Kitchen's Feeding Hope dinner in Los Angeles.

== Publications ==
- Voltaggio, Bryan; Voltaggio, Michael (2011). VOLT ink.: Recipes, Stories, Brothers. Ed Anderson (photographer), Charlie Palmer (foreword). Weldon Owen. ISBN 978-1616281618.
