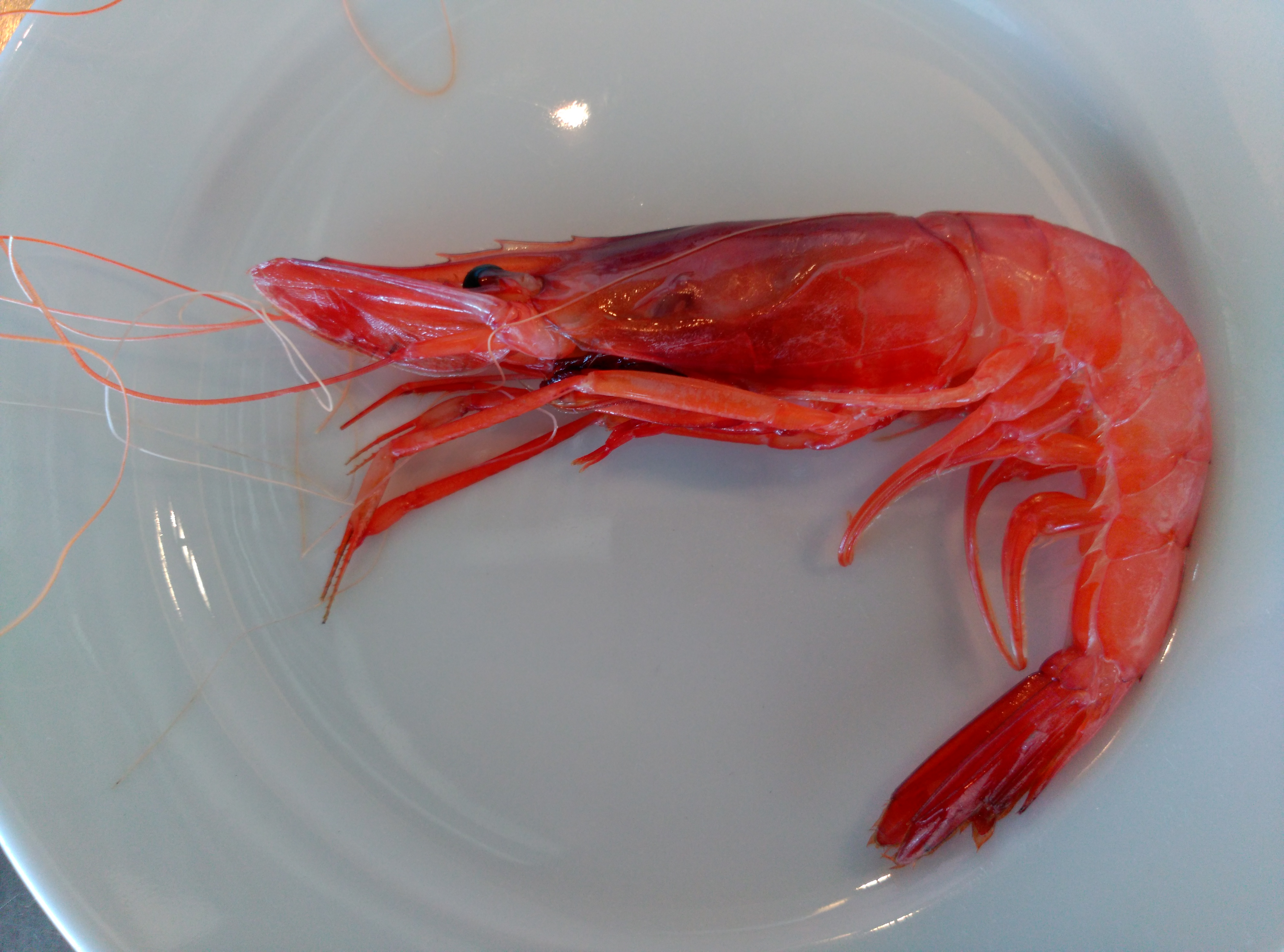
- Aristeus antennatus prepared as food

Scientific classification
- Domain: Eukaryota
- Kingdom: Animalia
- Phylum: Arthropoda
- Class: Malacostraca
- Order: Decapoda
- Suborder: Dendrobranchiata
- Family: Aristeidae
- Genus: Aristeus; Duvernoy, 1840

Synonyms
- Aristaeus Duvernoy, 1840

= Aristeus (crustacean) =

Genus of crustaceans

Aristeus is a genus of dendrobranchiate decapod crustaceans. Some species are subject to commercial fisheries.

== Taxonomy ==
The genus was described in 1840. The following species are classified in this genus:

- Aristeus alcocki Ramadan, 1938
- Aristeus antennatus (Risso, 1816)
- Aristeus antillensis A. Milne-Edwards & Bouvier, 1909
- Aristeus mabahissae Ramadan, 1938
- Aristeus pallidicauda Komai, 1993
- Aristeus semidentatus Spence Bate, 1881
- Aristeus varidens Holthuis, 1952
- Aristeus virilis (Spence Bate, 1881)
