= Fish collar =

Seafood delicacy

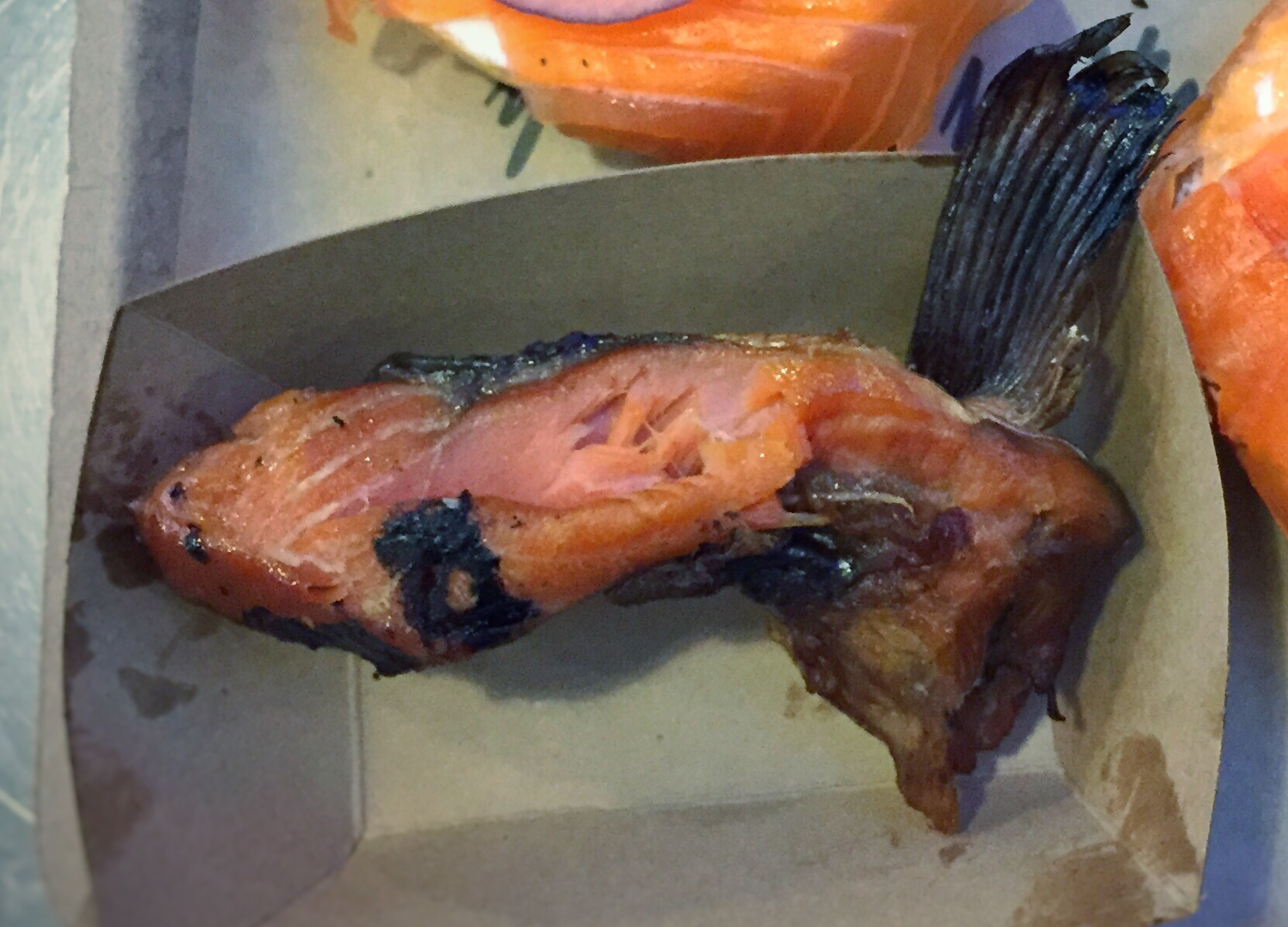
Lox collar

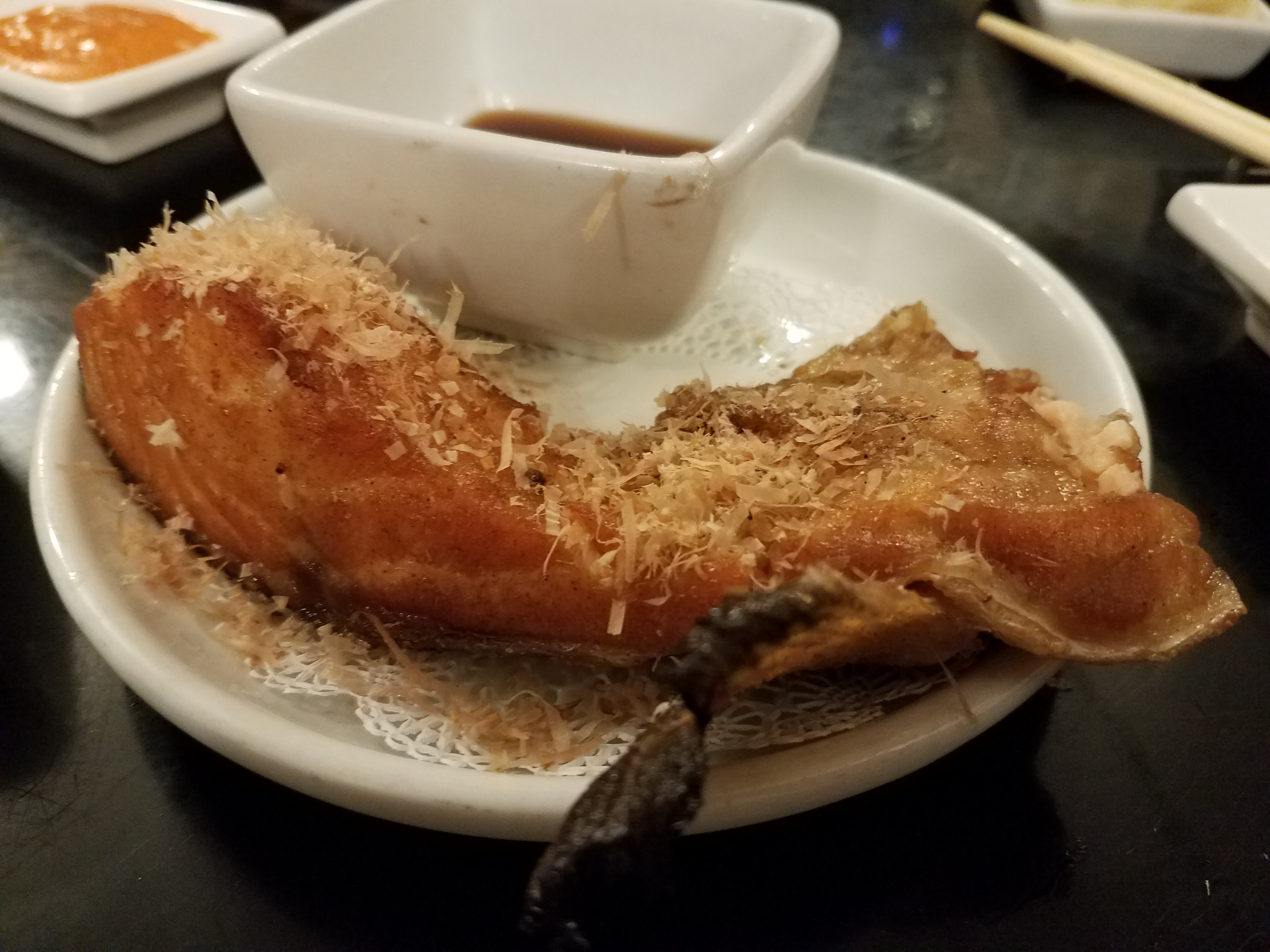
Sake kama (サーモンの首肉)

The fish collar, a cut from a fish's clavicle, is a seafood delicacy.

== Summary ==
Fish collars are popular in Asian countries and are mostly found in Asian fish markets. Collars come in chunks of fins, skin, and bones and are difficult to clean.
