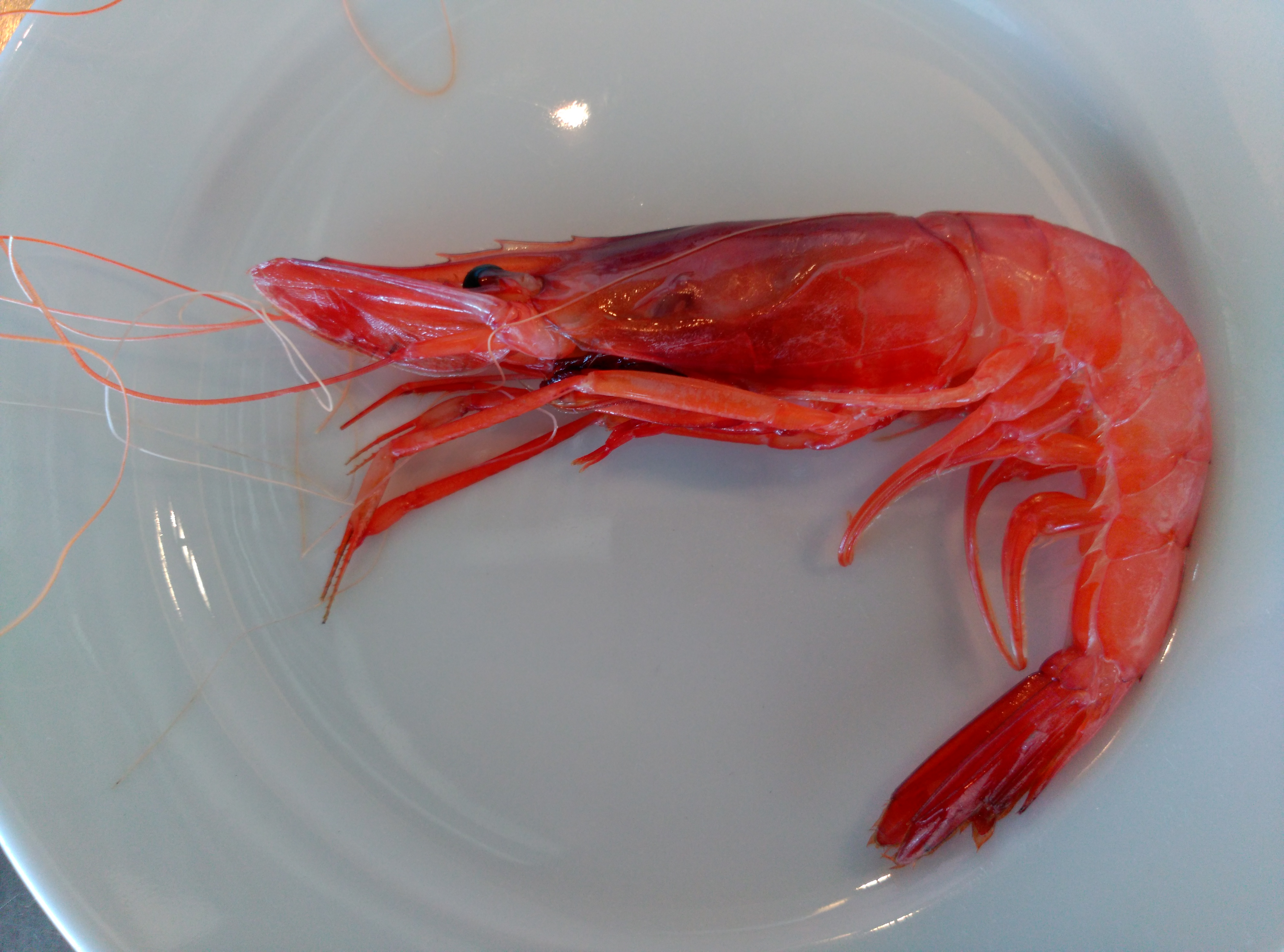

Scientific classification
- Kingdom: Animalia
- Phylum: Arthropoda
- Clade: Pancrustacea
- Class: Malacostraca
- Order: Decapoda
- Suborder: Dendrobranchiata
- Family: Aristeidae
- Genus: Aristeus
- Species: A. antennatus

Binomial name
- Aristeus antennatus Risso, 1816

Synonyms
- Penaeus antemarius Costes, 1890; Penaeus antennatus Risso, 1816; Sicyonia duvernoii Risso, 1844

= Aristeus antennatus =

Species of crustacean

Aristeus antennatus is a species of deep-water prawn, commonly known as red prawn or prawns from Palamós. The same crustacean is also fished in the Mediterranean Spanish towns of Dénia, Garrucha and Huelva. It has a very intense red color and it is valued for its firm meat. It is fished with the technique of bottom trawling and in the summer they are usually more abundant and larger in size.

== History ==
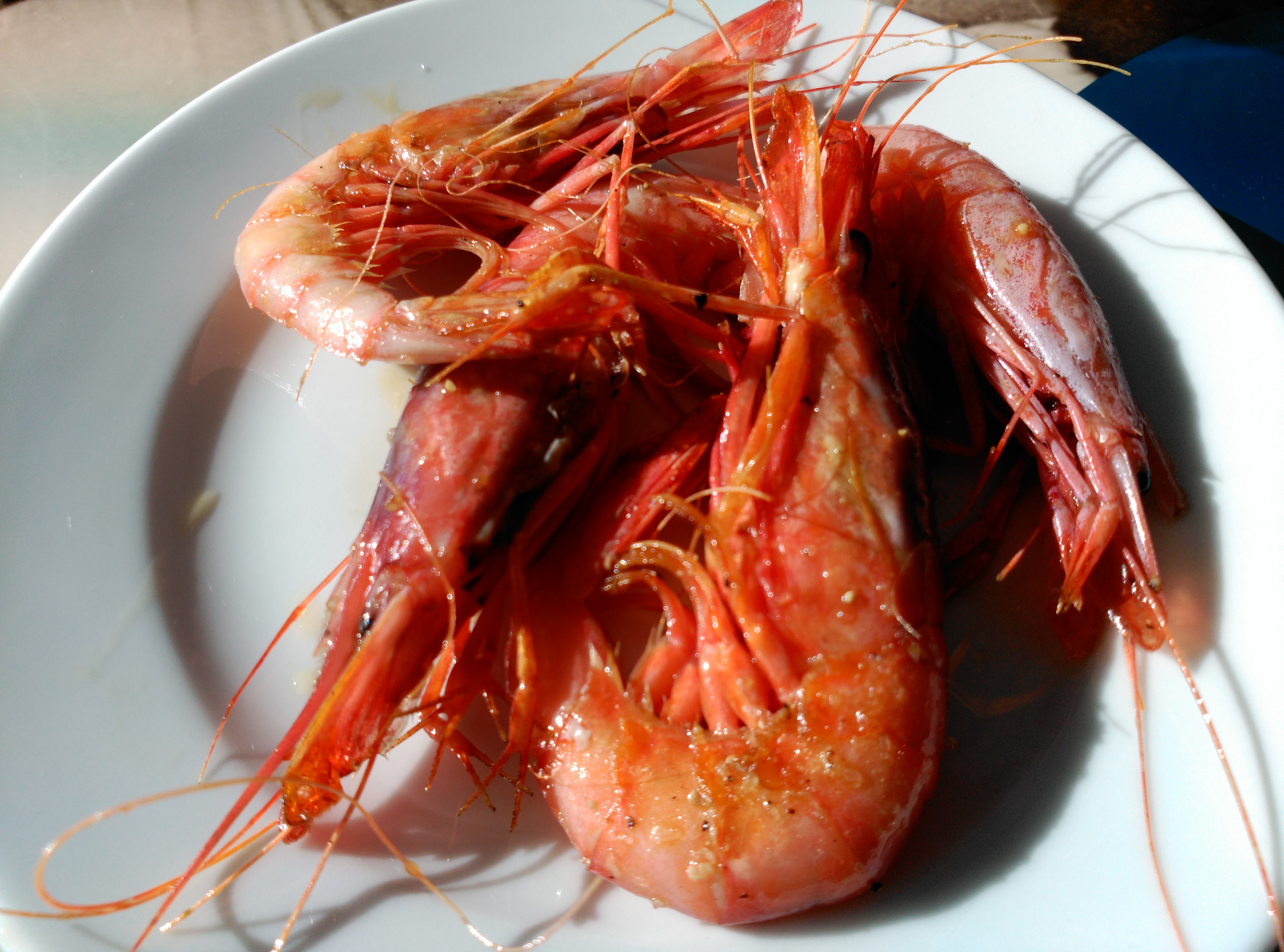
Grilled Palamós prawn

The prawn historically has been fished off the Palamós coasts and in other Catalan coastal towns as by example Blanes, Arenys, Roses or of the coast of Tarragona. Towards 1950 fishermen came from the south of Catalonia and of the Valencian Country. They introduced the technology of fish trawling in Palamós and fishing-grounds of shrimp were discovered.

Since then it has gained importance in the Confraria de Pescadors de Palamós (Palamós's Fishermen Guild).
