= 24 in 24: Last Chef Standing =

- Genre: Cooking
- Starring: Michael Symon; Esther Choi
- Judges: Various
- Country of origin: United States
- Original language: English
- No. of seasons: 3
- No. of episodes: 18

Production
- Production company: Lando Entertainment

Original release
- Network: Food Network
- Release: April 14, 2024 – present

24 in 24: Last Chef Standing is an American cooking competition show on the Food Network, hosted by Michael Symon and Esther Choi. It features 24 chefs who compete during a 24-hour period in eight shifts with 24 challenges.

The show was renewed for a second season, which premiered in April 2025.

The show was renewed for a third season, which is currently running in April 2026.

== Format ==
The show features 24 chefs competing in eight 3-hour shifts to undertake a total of 24 challenges. The challenges cover a wide range of culinary skills, and the order in which these skills are tested varies from one season to the next.

Some challenges award a cash prize to the winner, while others confer an advantage to be used later or allow one or more chefs to sit out in a "Break Room" for part or all of the current shift. The winner of the final challenge receives $50,000 cash and a trip to Hawaii valued at $24,000 (season 1), $75,000 cash (season 2), or $100,000 cash (season 3).

== Winners ==
Series	Placement	Contestant	Time completion	Date
1	Winner	Marcel Vigneron	24 hours	June 11, 2024
1	Runner-up	Carlos Anthony	24 hours	June 11, 2024
1	Third Place	Chris Oh	23 hours and 15 minutes	June 11, 2024
1	Fourth Place	Mika Leon	22 hours and 12 minutes	June 11, 2024
2	Winner	Jonathon Sawyer	24 hours	May 25, 2025
2	Runner-up	Bryan Voltaggio	24 hours	May 25, 2025
2	Third Place	Stephanie Izard	23 hours	May 25, 2025
2	Fourth Place	Nini Nguyen	23 hours	May 25, 2025
3	Winner	Lee Anne Wong	24 hours	May 31, 2026
3	Runner-Up	Alex Stupak	24 hours	May 31, 2026
3	Third Place	Christina Miros	23 hours and 15 minutes	May 31, 2026
3	Fourth Place	Viet Pham	21 hours and 55 minutes	May 31, 2026

== Reception ==
Andy Dehnart from Reality Blurred gave the show a C grade.
