= Bryan Voltaggio =

American chef (born 1976)

- Born: 1976 (age 49–50); Frederick, Maryland, U.S.
- Education: Culinary Institute of America
- Spouse: Jennifer Covell
- Culinary career
- Cooking style: Modern American
- Current restaurants: Wye Oak, Frederick, MD (2024), Voltaggio Brothers Steakhouse, National Harbor, MD (2016), Showroom, Frederick, MD (2020)
- Previous restaurants: VOLT, Frederick, MD (2008–2020), Aggio, Baltimore, MD (2014–2018), Family Meal, Frederick, MD (2013–2020), STRFSH, Santa Monica, CA (2017–2021), Estuary, Washington, DC (2019–2022), Thacher & Rye, Frederick, MD (2020–2024),
- Television shows: Top Chef: Las Vegas; Top Chef: All-Stars L.A.; Top Chef: Masters; Tournament of Champions; 24 in 24: Last Chef Standing

Bryan Voltaggio (born 1976) is an American celebrity chef, restaurateur, and author. He is a Top Chef television series alum; and he was a semi-finalist for the James Beard award. His brother is celebrity chef Michael Voltaggio. He resides in Frederick, Maryland and is known for Mid-Atlantic cuisine.

== Early life and education ==
Bryan Voltaggio was the oldest of three children, born to Sharon and John Voltaggio. At age 7, his parents divorced and the children initially lived with their mother, and later moved to their father's house. Starting in childhood, brothers Bryan and Michael were very close. He attended Governor Thomas Johnson High School. He is married to Jennifer Covell, whom he met in high school; and together they have three children.

His first job was as a busboy at a Holiday Inn in Frederick, Maryland. He took a vocational culinary program at Frederick Community College while attending Governor Thomas Johnson High School and by age 15, he was given the role of cook.

Voltaggio received an AOS degree in culinary arts in 1999 from The Culinary Institute of America. He was mentored by chef Charlie Palmer and Gerry Hayden, while working at restaurant Aureole.

== Restaurant career ==
In 2003, Voltaggio worked as the head chef at Charlie Palmer Steak.

Bryan, along with brother Michael, opened STRFSH, a fast-casual fish sandwich shop in Santa Monica, open from October 2017 to 2021. The Voltaggio brothers had co-owned Estuary in Washington D.C., which operated under their leadership from 2019 until March 2022.

=== Restaurants ===
==== Active ====
- Voltaggio Brothers Steak House, MGM National Harbor, Oxon Hill (December 2016–present)
- Showroom, Frederick (2020–present)
- Wye Oak Tavern at Visitation Hotel, Frederick (2024–present)

==== Closed ====
- Thacher & Rye, Frederick (2020–2024)
- VOLT, Frederick (2008–2020)
- Aggio, Baltimore (2014–2018)
- Family Meal, Baltimore (2015–August 2016)
- STRFSH, Santa Monica (2017–2021)
- Estuary, Washington D.C. (2019–March 2022)
- Lunchbox, Frederick, MD

== Television appearances ==
Voltaggio was the runner-up of the sixth season of Top Chef, Bravo's cooking competition show, placing second to his brother, Michael Voltaggio; subsequently he was also the runner-up on the fifth season of Top Chef Masters, and again runner-up to Melissa King on the seventeenth season of Top Chef: All-Stars L.A. He was the first chef to compete on both Top Chef and Top Chef Masters.

In 2022, both Voltaggio brothers appeared on season three of Guy Fieri's Tournament of Champions on Food Network.

In April 2024, Voltaggio and his brother were guest judges in the first season of the Food Network show 24 in 24: Last Chef Standing. He returned as a contestant in the second season in April 2025, finishing as the runner-up.

In December 2025, Voltaggio and his brother competed as a team in the first season of the Food Network show Tournament of Champions: All-Star Christmas and won.

In April 2026, Bryan Voltaggio became the first male chef to win Tournament of Champions in its seventh season.

== Awards, nominations and accolades ==
- 2010 James Beard Foundation Award "Best Chef: Mid-Atlantic" Nominee
- 2012 James Beard Foundation Award "Best Chef: Mid-Atlantic" Semi-finalist

== Personal life ==
Voltaggio lives in Maryland with his wife Jennifer and their three children.

== Publications ==
- Voltaggio, Bryan; Voltaggio, Michael (2011). VOLT ink.: Recipes, Stories, Brothers. Ed Anderson (photographer), Charlie Palmer (foreword). Weldon Owen. ISBN 978-1616281618.
- Voltaggio, Bryan (2015). Home: Recipes to Cook with Family and Friends. Little, Brown and Company. ISBN 978-0316323888.
- D'Agostino, Ryan, ed. (2015). The Eat Like a Man Guide to Feeding a Crowd: How to Cook for Family, Friends, and Spontaneous Parties. David Granger (introduction), Bryan Voltaggio (foreword), Mario Batali (foreword). Chronicle Books. ISBN 978-1452131849.
