= Agni (restaurant) =

Restaurant in Columbus, Ohio, U.S.

- Interactive map of Agni

Restaurant information
- Location: 716 South High Street, Columbus, Ohio, 43206, United States
- Coordinates: 39°56′51″N 82°59′51″W

Agni is a restaurant in Columbus, Ohio. It was named one of the twenty best new restaurants of 2024 by Bon Appétit.

== See also ==
- Restaurants in Columbus
