= Esther Choi =

American chef (born 1985)

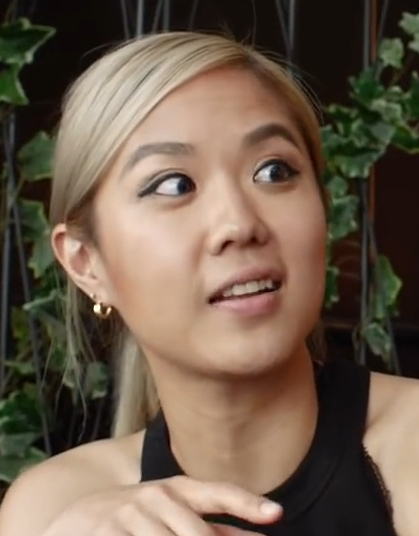
- Choi in 2018
- Born: Esther Choi; November 20, 1985 (age 40); New Jersey, U.S.
- Education: Rutgers University; Institute of Culinary Education
- Years active: 2006–present
- Children: 1
- Culinary career
- Cooking style: Korean
- Current restaurants: Mokbar (New York); Ms. Yoo (New York)
- Television shows: Heat Eaters (2023 - present); 24 in 24: Last Chef Standing (2024 - present)
- Website: www.estherchoi.com

Esther Choi (born November 20, 1985) is an American chef and television personality. She is best known for her appearances on Food Network shows and her contributions to the culinary scene in New York City.

== Early life ==
Choi was born in New Jersey and raised in Egg Harbor Township; she attended Egg Harbor Township High School, where she enjoyed classes in home economics. Her Korean grandmother would often cook Korean dishes, and taught Choi to make kimchi. Choi and her parents lived in South Korea for three years during her childhood. Back in the United States, Choi began working in restaurants at age 14.

Choi graduated from Rutgers University and the Institute of Culinary Education in New York.

== Career ==
Choi has made a name for herself through television appearances on shows like Bobby's Triple Threat, Throwdown! with Michael Symon, Chopped, Battle of the Brothers, and Iron Chef: Quest for an Iron Legend. Choi served as the host of the Hot Ones spinoff Heat Eaters. In April 2024, she began co-hosting Food Network series 24 in 24: Last Chef Standing with Symon. The series was renewed for a second season, which premiered in April 2025.

Choi opened her first restaurant, mŏkbar, of which she is a chef and owner, in 2014. The restaurant serves dumplings made from her grandmother's recipe. She later opened a second location in Brooklyn. She is a chef and a partner at Ms. Yoo in Manhattan, which is named after her grandmother.

== Personal life ==
As of 2024, Choi lives in New York City with her partner Joshua Griffiths. She has one son born in February 2024.
