= Viet Pham =

American chef (born 1979)

- Born: 1979 (age 46–47)
- Education: California Culinary Academy
- Occupation: Chef
- Website: www.foodnetwork.com/profiles/contestants/viet-pham/bio

Viet Pham is a chef and a previous winner of Iron Chef America.

== Early life ==
Pham was born in a Malaysian refugee camp in 1979. His parents are Vietnamese but he is Malaysian and he fled the country during the Vietnam War. The family moved to the United States when he was five months old and has lived in the U.S. ever since.

Pham was teased often as a young child, and has said that he began to "resent being Asian" because of this bullying. He often avoided traditional Asian food while growing up, opting for McDonald's hamburgers, because he thought "if I could eat American food, it would make me feel more American.”

== Career ==
Pham attended culinary school in San Francisco but began his career in software. His first chef job was at Casey's Irish Pub Downtown where he was hired in 2006 upon graduating from Le Cordon Bleu. After working in San Francisco, owner Blake Ballard convinced Chef Pham to join Spark Restaurant and Lounge in Provo, Utah. In 2009, Pham opened his own restaurant, Forage, in Utah with co-Chef Bowman Brown. In 2011 Pham received the Best New Chef Award from Food & Wine Magazine. In 2012, Pham was an Iron Chef America winner by beating Chef Bobby Flay. He also appeared on the second season of Extreme Chef. In 2018, he faced off against Chef Bobby Flay again on Beat Bobby Flay, securing a second victory against him.

In 2016 Forage closed, with Pham and Brown parting ways. Pham's next project was the fast-casual fried chicken restaurant, Pretty Bird Hot Chicken. Starting in downtown Salt Lake City, the Pretty Bird brand has expanded to four locations as of the end of 2022. These include the original downtown location as well as Sugar House, Midvale, and Park City.
