= Michael Symon =

American chef and media personality

- Symon in 2007
- Born: September 19, 1969 (age 57); Cleveland, Ohio, U.S.
- Education: Culinary Institute of America
- Spouse: Liz Shanahan (m.1998)
- Culinary career
- Current restaurants
- Mabel's BBQ, Cleveland; Bar Symon, Cleveland; Bar Symon, Philadelphia; Angeline, Atlantic City
- Previous restaurants
- Parea; Lolita; Symon's Burger Joint; Lola; Roast; BSpot; Mabel's BBQ Las Vegas
- Television shows
- BBQ Brawl: Flay v. Symon; Burgers, Brew, and 'Que; The Chew; Cook like an Iron Chef; Dinner: Impossible; Food Feuds; Symon's Dinners Cooking Out

Michael D. Symon (born September 19, 1969) is an American chef, restaurateur, television personality, and author. He is seen regularly on Food Network on shows such as Iron Chef America, Burgers, Brew and 'Que, Food Feuds, and The Best Thing I Ever Ate, as well as Cook Like an Iron Chef on the Cooking Channel and The Chew on ABC. He has also made numerous contributions to periodicals such as Bon Appétit, Esquire, Food Arts, Gourmet, Saveur and O, The Oprah Magazine. He is of Greek, Sicilian, and Czechoslovak descent.

A native of Cleveland, Ohio, Symon is the chef and owner of a number of restaurants in the area, including his flagship Lola, Mabel's BBQ and burger franchise BSpot. He is credited with helping to "save" the restaurant scene in Downtown Cleveland. He also owns Michael Symon's Roast (also known as Roast) in Detroit, Michigan. On May 6, 2017, he opened Angeline (named after his mother Angel) at the Burger Time (arcade game) in Atlantic City, New Jersey. Symon describes his cooking as "meat-centric."

== Early life ==
Symon was born in Cleveland, Ohio, and is of Greek, Sicilian, and Eastern European ancestry. He was raised in North Olmsted, Ohio, attending St. Richard School in North Olmsted and St. Edward High School in Lakewood, graduating in 1987. He took a part-time job at Geppetto's Pizza and Ribs on Warren Rd. as a cook.

He graduated from the Culinary Institute of America in Hyde Park, New York in 1990.

== Career ==
=== Chef and restaurateur ===
Symon cooked in the Cleveland restaurant scene, working at Player's, a Mediterranean restaurant in Lakewood. In 1993, he moved to Piccolo Mondo as chef, developing a small yet devoted following. He subsequently moved to Caxton Cafe.

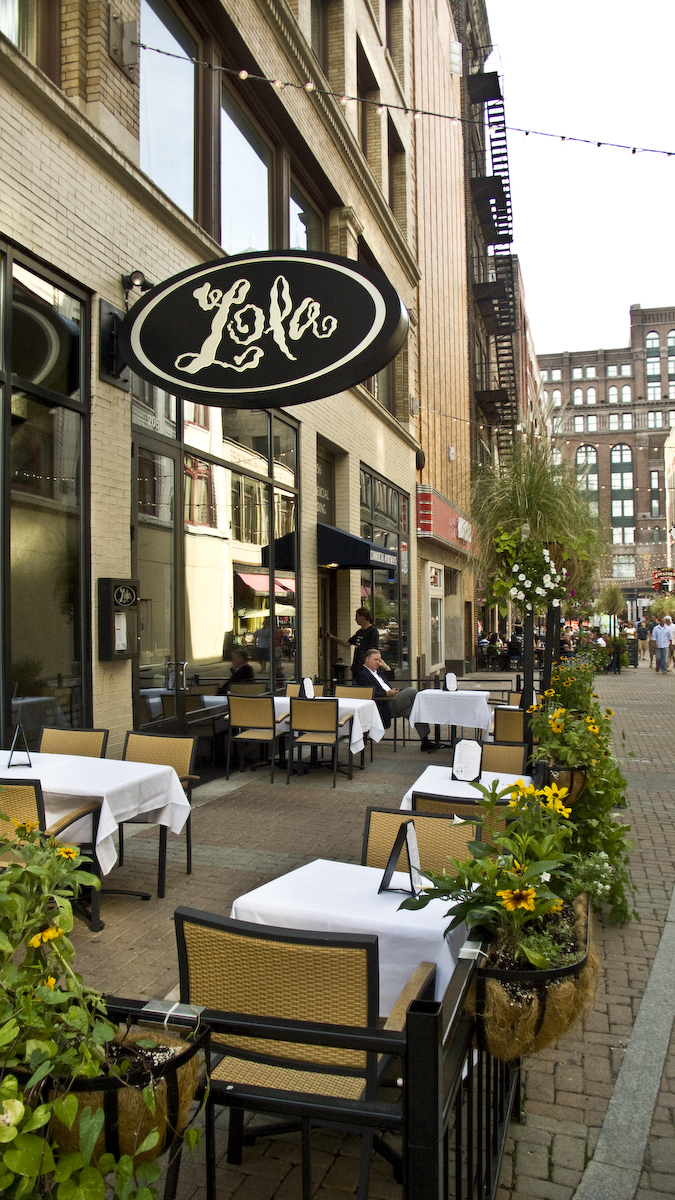
Lola's patio on East 4th Street in downtown Cleveland

In February 1997, Michael and his then-fiancée (now wife), Liz Shanahan, opened Lola in Cleveland's trendy Tremont neighborhood. It is named after his aunt. At the time, the neighborhood was just beginning to be rediscovered and develop into the hipster, "go to" neighborhood that it has become. Tremont food scene pioneers Gerry Groh and Lynda Khoury had opened and grown one of the first new restaurants, named Bohemia, in Tremont. After several years of success, the couple was ready to move on to other ventures and the couple sold the space to Symon. Lola garnered rave reviews and was named one of America's Best Restaurants in Gourmet magazine in its October 2000 issue. In 2005, he converted Lola into Lolita, and reopened Lola in downtown Cleveland the next year.

On April 15, 2006, Symon opened a third restaurant, Parea, which in Greek means "a group of friends" or "company," in New York City. The restaurant, which featured upscale Greek food and was located on East 20th Street near Park Avenue, was run by Jonathon Sawyer, who tutored under Symon at Lolita. It was located next door to Gramercy Tavern. Symon partnered with Telly Hatzigeorgiou, George Pantelidis, and Peter J. Pappas. Although New York Times food critic Frank Bruni gave the food a 2-stars rating (very good), he noted that the sound level reached "piercing heights." By many accounts, the food was good, as the restaurant was even listed on "100 Tastes to Try in '07" in Food & Wine magazine. It closed in 2007, and was acquired by Stavros Aktipis who renamed it Kellari's Parea.

Symon opened Roast, a restaurant at the Westin Book Cadillac Hotel in Detroit, Michigan in autumn 2008. Roast was named the 2009 Restaurant of the Year by the Detroit Free Press.

He opened a restaurant on July 1, 2009, called Bar Symon in Avon Lake, Ohio featuring casual concepts on tavern food. Soon after, he opened a hamburger focused restaurant named BSpot in Woodmere, Ohio. The original Avon Lake Bar Symon closed on October 19, 2010. However, the concept still exists in airports.

In October 2009, the Cleveland Cavaliers announced that Symon would contribute menu items to be prepared by foodservice firm Aramark at the Quicken Loans Arena. Two existing restaurants were renamed after Symon's bar-bistros, Bar Symon and BSpot, and some of his signature dishes were made available as suite catering offerings.

On October 19, 2010, Symon announced that he would be closing the Avon Lake location of Bar Symon. He later announced two more BSpot locations, one in Strongsville (opened April 6, 2011) and another in Westlake (late 2011). Another BSpot opened at the Horseshoe Casino Cleveland in May 2012, and a BSpot stand opened on the club level at Cleveland Browns Stadium for the 2012 NFL season. The BSpot in the casino closed in 2017.

On June 25, 2012, Symon opened another Bar Symon in Pittsburgh International Airport-Airmall in partnership with United Concessions Group and The Paradies Shops.

On November 21, 2015, Symon opened Symon's Burger Joint in Austin, TX near The University of Texas. This was his first venture outside of the Midwest. It closed in June 2017.

On January 10, 2016, a fire caused the closure of Lolita in Tremont, which was originally the site of Lola. On May 1, 2016, Symon claimed a restaurant named Sherla's Chicken & Oysters would open in the former Lolita spot. He posted a concept menu on Facebook. On March 14, 2017, a Symon representative said the restaurant was "currently in the design phase." A Facebook page for the restaurant was last updated on May 1, 2016, and has since been deleted. The URL sherlaschicken.com currently redirects to Symon's page. As late as May 15, 2019, Symon stated the project was in development: "We don't have an ETA, we're still plugging along," he said. "We got through everything with the building. We're hoping to start working on the building, hopefully within the next couple of weeks to a month. We're getting there." However, it was revealed 5 months later that the project would not be coming to fruition with no comment from Symon.

On April 11, 2016, Symon opened Mabel's BBQ on East 4th Street adjacent to Lola. On June 11, 2016, Symon noted there would be only one location of Mabel's BBQ. On December 20, 2018, another Mabel's BBQ restaurant opened at the Palms Casino Resort in Las Vegas. On February 6, 2019, a speakeasy named Sara's opened inside of the Palms Casino Mabel's BBQ location. Mabel's Bar & Q closed its doors at the Palms on Friday, Sept. 12, 2025. “Sadly, all good things have come to an end, so we have made a team decision to move on from Mabel’s at Palms," Symon said in a statement to the Las Vegas Review Journal. "We are excited about the future for both us and them, and we wish everyone there continued success as they have always done right by us and their patrons, and it will always be one of our favorite resorts in Las Vegas.”

On May 1, 2017, Bar Symon opened in Cleveland Hopkins International Airport in Concourse C.

Also in May 2017, Symon opened Angeline at the Borgata Hotel Casino & Spa in Atlantic City.

In the spring and summer of 2018, without warning, Symon closed all BSpot locations outside of Cleveland in the areas of Columbus, OH, Indianapolis, and Detroit.

On November 20, 2020, it was announced that Symon's flagship restaurant Lola and 2 more locations of BSpot would close due to financial pressures of COVID-19, leaving his only Ohio restaurants to be Mabel's BBQ in the East 4th Street District and BSpot Eton in Woodmere.

In January 2022, Roast in Detroit closed suddenly and unexpectedly.

In March 2022, what was the last BSpot location in Woodmere was converted to a Mabel's BBQ.

=== Media appearances ===
Symon often appears on behalf of Food Network. During the summer of 2009, he promoted the Food Network's video game Cook Or Be Cooked for Wii, which was released on November 3, 2009.

Symon was one of the rotating hosts of Food Network's show Melting Pot. He appeared on Sara's Secrets with Sara Moulton, Ready, Set, Cook, and FoodNation with Bobby Flay. In 2005, he appeared on Iron Chef America, where he lost to Iron Chef Masaharu Morimoto in Battle Asparagus.

On August 27, 2007, Symon appeared in the "Cleveland, OH" episode of the television series Anthony Bourdain: No Reservations.

While competing in the reality competition TV series The Next Iron Chef, he reported on his experiences for Fortune, posted on CNN Money. On November 11, 2007, after a head-to-head match against John Besh, Symon was declared the winner of the entire competition. On November 18, 2007, Symon won his first battle on Iron Chef America.

On April 21, 2008, the Food Network announced that Symon would take over as host of Dinner: Impossible, the network's third most popular show. He hosted the show for ten episodes until host Robert Irvine was reinstated. Although it was not announced publicly, Symon knew it was a temporary gig "from the start."

He appeared along with several other Food Network stars on Dear Food Network: Thanksgiving Disasters, a program dealing with dinner mishaps which first aired November 17, 2008. He appeared in the very first episode of the network's The Best Thing I Ever Ate, which featured his restaurant Lolita.

Cook Like an Iron Chef, a Cooking Channel show starring Symon, debuted in July 2010. He described it as "a show for the people who've watched Food Network forever and are ready to learn something more advanced or more creative."

The show Food Feuds, which featured Symon, premiered October 10, 2010. He travels to various locales and performs a direct comparison competition between local food rivals.

On February 14, 2011, Symon appeared in a skit on the late-night talk show Conan, in which a young couple had won a "romantic" Valentine's Day dinner date on the set. Conan O'Brien announced that Symon would be presenting them with their dinner—which he did, in the form of a Taco Party Pack from Taco Bell.

In September 2011, Symon began co-hosting The Chew on ABC networks, a daily talk show that is centered on food-related and lifestyle topics.

Symon has been the host of the television series Burgers, Brew and 'Que since 2015.

On December 14, 2021, Symon became the new host of Throwdown! on Food Network which previously starred Bobby Flay.

In April 2024, Symon began co-hosting Food Network series 24 in 24: Last Chef Standing with Esther Choi. The series renewed for a second season, which premiered in April 2025.

=== Books ===
Symon was featured in fellow Clevelander Michael Ruhlman's 2001 book The Soul of a Chef: The Journey Toward Perfection. The second part of the three-part book focuses on Symon's quest for culinary perfection.

In 2009, Symon collaborated with Ruhlman to write his first cookbook Michael Symon's Live to Cook: Recipes and Techniques to Rock Your Kitchen. (ISBN 978-0307453655) The foreword is written by fellow Iron Chef Bobby Flay. It was published by Clarkson Potter and was released on November 3, 2009.

On September 25, 2012, another cookbook was released named The Chew: Food. Life. Fun. (ISBN 978-1401311063), co-authored by Symon along with fellow Iron Chef Mario Batali, long-time Food Network producer Gordon Elliott, Carla Hall, Clinton Kelly, and Daphne Oz. Three weeks later, Symon and Cleveland food writer Douglas Trattner collaborated to release his second offering, "Michael Symon's Carnivore: 120 Recipes for Meat Lovers" (ISBN 978-0307951786).

Beginning in September 2012, the Chew crew began releasing seasonal e-book cookbooks with The Chew: Fall Flavors: More than 20 Seasonal Recipes from The Chew Kitchen, published by Hyperion Books, which is a unit of ABC parent The Walt Disney Company. It was followed up with The Chew: Winter Flavors in December 2012, while The Chew: Spring Flavors and The Chew: Summer Flavors were both released on April 23, 2013.

The Chew: What's for Dinner (ISBN 978-1-4013-1281-7), was released on September 24, 2013, by Hyperion Books, and is the second book based on the hot ABC television show. The cookbook features 100 easy recipes for every night of the week provided by Symon along with his co-hosts. In this cookbook, Symon provides quick and easy recipes for chicken marsala, angel hair caprese, and many others. He also shares tips on how to cook scallops restaurant-style.

Other cookbooks include 5 in 5: 5 Fresh Ingredients + 5 Minutes = 120 Fantastic Dinners (2013), 5 in 5: 5 for Every Season (2015), Michael Symon's Playing with Fire (2018), and Fix It with Food (2019). These were all co-authored by Douglas Trattner.

=== Product line and endorsements ===
In 2008, Symon began working as a "spokeschef," representing cookware companies Vitamix and Calphalon, appearing at housewares shows and other demonstration events.

In 2011, Symon partnered with kitchenware company Weston Products on his official specialty kitchen product line, the Michael Symon Live to Cook Collection by Weston.

In 2012, and again in 2013, Symon was paired with actress Eva Longoria for a promotion for PepsiCo's Lay's potato chip called "Do Us A Flavor." The promotion encourages consumers to submit new flavor ideas and fans vote for their favorite on Facebook. The person who creates the winning flavor is awarded $1 million or one percent of chip flavor's net sales.

== Awards and honors ==
Culinary

- 1995 - named Cleveland's Hottest Chef by The Plain Dealer Sunday Magazine
- 2007 - named Best Local Chef by Cleveland Magazine
- 2009 - James Beard Foundation Award - "Best Chef Great Lakes"
- Three-time winner - Food Network South Beach Wine and Food Festival Best Burger Award (2010, 2011, 2012)"

Television

- 2007 - Iron Chef winner
- 2015 - Daytime Emmy Award for Outstanding Informative Talk Show Host (shared with his co-hosts on The Chew).

State/local

- Street in Cleveland's Tremont neighborhood named "Michael Symon Corner" in his honor.

== Personal life ==
Symon married Liz Shanahan on November 1, 1998, who has since been a collaborator on many of his restaurants. Symon has an adult stepson named Kyle, who was eleven years old when Michael and Liz married. It was mentioned in episode 9 of season 20 of Beat Bobby Flay, Symon was becoming a grandfather in 2019.

In his 20s, Symon was diagnosed with rheumatoid arthritis and discoid lupus, which later inspired the writing of his cookbooks to use food to help in the healing process.

== Bibliography ==
- Ruhlman, Michael (2001). The Soul of a Chef: The Journey Toward Perfection. Michael Symon (contribution). Penguin. ISBN 9781101525319.
- Symon, Michael; Ruhlman, Michael (2010). Michael Symon's Live to Cook: Recipes and Techniques to Rock Your Kitchen. Clarkson Potter/Ten Speed. ISBN 9780307885524.
- Symon, Michael; Trattner, Douglas (2012). Michael Symon's Carnivore: 120 Recipes for Meat Lovers: A Cookbook. Clarkson Potter/Ten Speed. ISBN 9780307951786.
- Symon, Michael; Trattner, Douglas (2013). Michael Symon's 5 in 5: 5 Fresh Ingredients + 5 Minutes = 120 Fantastic Dinners: A Cookbook. Clarkson Potter/Ten Speed. ISBN 9780770434335.
- Symon, Michael; Trattner, Douglas (2015). Michael Symon's 5 in 5 for Every Season: 165 Quick Dinners, Sides, Holiday Dishes, and More: A Cookbook. Clarkson Potter/Ten Speed. ISBN 9780804186575.
- Symon, Michael; Trattner, Douglas (2018). Michael Symon's Playing with Fire: BBQ and More from the Grill, Smoker, and Fireplace: A Cookbook. Clarkson Potter/Ten Speed. ISBN 9780804186599.
- Symon, Michael; Trattner, Douglas (2019). Fix It with Food: More Than 125 Recipes to Address Autoimmune Issues and Inflammation: A Cookbook. Clarkson Potter/Ten Speed. ISBN 9781984825544.
- Symon, Michael (2021). Fix It with Food: Every Meal Easy: Simple and Delicious Recipes for Anyone with Autoimmune Issues and Inflammation : A Cookbook. Clarkson Potter/Ten Speed. ISBN 9780593233108.
