= List of Iron Chef America episodes =

This is the list of the episodes for the American cooking television series and competition Iron Chef America, produced by Food Network. The series is based on the Japanese series Iron Chef and is a cooking competition in which a challenger chef "battles" one of the resident "Iron Chefs" by cooking five or more dishes in a one-hour time slot based around a secret ingredient or ingredients, and sometimes theme. In most episodes, three judges score the meal in three categories, with 10 points available to each judge for taste, 5 points for creativity, and 5 points for presentation, for a possible total of 60 points. Exceptions are noted for individual episodes.

== Episodes ==
=== Battle of the Masters: 2004 ===
Iron Chef America was first aired as a mini-series entitled Iron Chef America: Battle of the Masters. For Battle of the Masters, two of the original Iron Chefs competed along with three Food Network personalities in various match ups with one another.

Episode	Show #	Iron Chef	Challenger Iron Chef	Secret ingredient	Winner	Final score
0	IASP05	A special behind-the-scenes preview episode. No battles took place.				
1	IANS01	Bobby Flay	Hiroyuki Sakai	Trout	Bobby Flay	55–51
2	IANS02	Mario Batali	Masaharu Morimoto	Spiny lobster	Mario Batali	57–51
3	IANS03	Wolfgang Puck	Masaharu Morimoto	Eggs	Wolfgang Puck	52–47
4	IANS04	Bobby Flay & Masaharu Morimoto	Mario Batali & Hiroyuki Sakai	Fruits de mer (scallops, langoustine, and sea urchin)	Bobby Flay & Masaharu Morimoto	71–55

^1 This is Wolfgang Puck's only battle as an Iron Chef.
^102 The secret ingredient selection was composed of white and brown Chicken eggs, Ostrich eggs, Salmon roe, Flying Fish roe, and Caviar.
^2 This episode had four judges, and thus a maximum possible score of 80.

=== Season 1: 2005 ===
Episode	Show #	Iron Chef	Challenger	Challenger specialty	Secret ingredient(s) or theme	Winner	Final score
1	IA1A09	Bobby Flay	Rick Bayless	Traditional Mexican	Buffalo	Bobby Flay	50–49
2	IA1A07	Mario Batali	Roberto Treviño	Nuevo Latino	Catfish	Mario Batali	52–43
3	IA1A06	Bobby Flay	Ming Tsai	East-West	Duck	Ming Tsai	48–43
4	IA1A10	Mario Batali	Michael Laiskonis	Dessert	Chocolate and Coconut	Mario Batali	50–45
5	IA1A03	Masaharu Morimoto	Rob Feenie	French-Asian	Crab	Rob Feenie	45–39
6	IA1A05	Bobby Flay	Govind Armstrong	Seasonal Californian	Squash	Bobby Flay	48–36
7	IA1A01	Masaharu Morimoto	Roberto Donna	Northern Italian	Scallops	Masaharu Morimoto	50–33
8	IA1A04	Mario Batali	Scott Q. Campbell	New American	Cheese	Mario Batali	53–40
9	IA1A02	Mario Batali	Anita Lo	Asian Fusion	Mushrooms	Anita Lo	54–45
10	IA1A08	Cat Cora	Alex Lee	Contemporary French	Potatoes	Cat Cora	47–46

^3 Roberto Donna completed only two of the required five dishes.
^4 The cheeses in this battle consisted of five traditional Italian cheeses: mascarpone, ricotta, Parmigiano-Reggiano, gorgonzola and mozzarella.

=== Season 2: 2005 ===
Episode	Show #	Iron Chef	Challenger	Challenger specialty	Secret ingredient(s) or theme	Winner	Final score
1	IA0204	Mario Batali	Todd English	Mediterranean	Pizza dough	Mario Batali	47–45
2	IA0213	Cat Cora	Kerry Simon	Modern American	Hamburger	Kerry Simon	49.1–49
3	IA0201	Bobby Flay	Adam Perry Lang	Barbecue	Chicken	Bobby Flay	49–48
4	IA0203	Masaharu Morimoto	Aarón Sanchez	Latin American	Black bass	Draw	45–45
5	IA0202	Mario Batali	Traci Des Jardins	French-California	Shrimp	Traci Des Jardins	47–41
6	IA0211	Cat Cora	Sam Choy	Hawaiian/Chinese	Clams	Cat Cora	51.5–45.75
7	IA0207	Bobby Flay	Michelle Bernstein	Nuevo Latin/Fusion	Sweet onion	Michelle Bernstein	47–41
8	IA0214	Masaharu Morimoto	Michael Symon	American/Mediterranean	Asparagus	Masaharu Morimoto	53.5–44
9	IA0208	Mario Batali	Tamara Murphy	Pan-Mediterranean	Crawfish	Mario Batali	50–48
10	IA0206	Masaharu Morimoto	Tom Douglas	Northwest Pan Pacific	Wild Chinook salmon	Tom Douglas	48–45
11	IA0205	Bobby Flay	Mary Sue Milliken & Susan Feniger	Southwestern	Turkey	Draw	42–42
12	IA0212	Mario Batali	Wylie Dufresne	Molecular gastronomy	Tilapia	Mario Batali	46–43.5
13	IA0209	Bobby Flay	David Burke	Contemporary American/French	Lamb	Bobby Flay	51–48
14	IA0210	Cat Cora	Neal Fraser	New American	Pork	Neal Fraser	47–41

^110 Kerry Simon is the first judge to compete as a challenger on Iron Chef America, having judged battle Trout and battle Spiny Lobster, though this episode does not mention him being a judge.
^112 Consisted of ground chuck and sirloin beef, eighty-percent lean and twenty-percent fat.
^111 Simon’s win over Cora is the thinnest margin of victory in all of Iron Chef America.
^5 Tamara Murphy is the first female challenger to lose to the Iron Chef. The three previous female competitors won their respective battles.
^6 In this match Milliken and Feniger only had one sous-chef to adhere to the three-to-a-kitchen rule.

=== Season 3: 2006–2007 ===
Episode	Show #	Iron Chef	Challenger	Challenger specialty	Secret ingredient(s) or theme	Winner	Final score
1	IA0301	Mario Batali	John Besh	French/Cajun	Andouille	John Besh	55–49
2	IA0302	Bobby Flay	Beau MacMillan	Organic Contemporary American	American Kobe beef	Beau MacMillan	49–46
3	IA0303	Cat Cora	Jon Shook & Vinny Dotolo	Eclectic	Eggplant	Cat Cora	51–50
4	IA0304	Bobby Flay	Ralph Pagano	New American	Barramundi	Bobby Flay	56–42
5	IA0310	Masaharu Morimoto	Roberto Donna	Northern Italian	Squid	Roberto Donna	54–48
6	IA0306	Bobby Flay	Laurent Tourondel	French	Goat cheese	Laurent Tourondel	52–43
7	IA0305	Mario Batali	Ludovic Lefebvre	French	Bigeye tuna	Mario Batali	53–47
8	IA0312	Bobby Flay	Susur Lee	Chinese Fusion	Bacon	Draw	46–46
9	IA0307	Masaharu Morimoto	Christophe Eme	French	Lobster	Masaharu Morimoto	53–40
10	IA0315	Bobby Flay	Morou Ouattara	African / Middle Eastern / French Fusion	Frozen peas	Bobby Flay	54–47
11	IA0308	Cat Cora	Walter Scheib	American	Dungeness crab	Walter Scheib	55–49
12	IA0309	Bobby Flay	Josh Dechellis	Asian	Chicken eggs	Bobby Flay	47–43
13	IA0311	Cat Cora	Michael Psilakis	Greek	Puff pastry	Cat Cora	50–48
14	IA0314	Mario Batali	Rick Tramonto & Gale Gand	French (Tramonto), Pastry (Gand)	Fennel	Mario Batali	54–46
15	IA0316	Masaharu Morimoto	Patricia Yeo	Asian Fusion	Tofu	Masaharu Morimoto	59–55
16	IA0322	Bobby Flay	David Bull	American Regional	Wild boar	Bobby Flay	49–43
17	IA0317	Cat Cora	Elizabeth Falkner	Desserts	Honey	Cat Cora	39–38
18	IA0313	Cat Cora	Joey Campanaro	American/Mediterranean	Venison	Cat Cora	45–42
19	IA0319	Giada De Laurentiis & Bobby Flay	Rachael Ray & Mario Batali	Italian (De Laurentiis), Quick and Easy (Ray)	Cranberries	Rachael Ray & Mario Batali	53–46
20	IA0318	Mario Batali	Richard Blais	Modern American	Chickpeas	Mario Batali	51–48
21	IA0320	Cat Cora	Walter Royal	Southern Regional	Ostrich	Walter Royal	51–43
22	IA0324	Bobby Flay	Johnny Vinczencz	Caribbean cuisine	Citrus fruit	Bobby Flay	50–46
23	IA0321	Mario Batali	Ian Chalermkittichai	Modern Thai	Lentils	Mario Batali	53–48
24	IA0323	Masaharu Morimoto	Homaro Cantu	Molecular gastronomy	Beets	Homaro Cantu	52–51

^7 Roberto Donna is the first chef to request a re-match.
^8 First aired on Food Network Canada on May 3, 2006.
^9 Eme brought only one sous-chef to the competition; his other sous-chef was needed to operate his restaurant in his absence. Eme is married to actress Jeri Ryan, who later served as a judge on ICA.
^10 Chef Morou won a Washington D.C. preliminary competition in December, 2005 for the chance to compete on the show.
^11 Patricia Yeo is the first former ICA sous chef (under Bobby Flay) to compete against an Iron Chef.
^12 Elizabeth Falkner was a sous chef under Cat Cora for several ICA episodes.
^13 This was a special 90-minute episode that pitted two guest Food Network personalities against each other. Each personality was paired with an Iron Chef.
^14 Walter Royal had a third sous chef for the first five minutes of the competition. This sous chef, who primarily participated by peeling potatoes, was a 12-year-old working in a mentor program with Chef Royal.
^15 This first aired on the Throwdown! with Bobby Flay Marathon on January 1, 2007.

=== Season 4: 2007 ===
Episode	Show #	Iron Chef	Challenger	Challenger specialty	Secret ingredient(s) or theme	Winner	Final score
1	IA0403	Bobby Flay	Graham Bowles	Progressive	Chocolate	Bobby Flay	49–47
2	IA0404	Bobby Flay	Lynn Crawford	Contemporary Canadian	Peanuts	Bobby Flay	51–48
3	IA0409	Mario Batali & Tony Abou-Ganim	Robert Gadsby & Bridget Albert	Progressive American (Gadsby), Cocktails (Abou-Ganim & Albert)	Mango	Mario Batali & Tony Abou-Ganim	80–63
4	IA0410	Bobby Flay	Marc Murphy	French-Italian	Breakfast	Bobby Flay	54–45
5	IA0405	Bobby Flay	José Andrés	Modern Spanish	Goat	José Andrés	55–48
6	IA0406	Masaharu Morimoto	Linton Hopkins	Southern	Sablefish	Masaharu Morimoto	45–40
7	IA0401	Mario Batali	Chris Cosentino	Italian	Garlic	Mario Batali	46–44
8	IA0402	Cat Cora	David Myers	Modern French	Oysters	Cat Cora	55–54
9	IA0408	Masaharu Morimoto	Tim Love	Urban Southwestern	Chiles	Tim Love	48–47
10	IA0407	Bobby Flay	Peter Kelly	Modern American	Cowboy ribeye	Peter Kelly	51–48

^16 First aired on Food Network Canada on February 11, 2007.
^17 Lynn Crawford is the first Canadian woman to compete in Kitchen Stadium. She is a Food Network Canada personality as part of the series Restaurant Makeover.
^18 This episode featured a guest mixologist paired with each competing chef. The mixologists were required to prepare a drink to accompany each dish that also highlighted the secret ingredient. The drinks were judged on a 10-point scale (6 for taste, two each for presentation and creativity) which was added to the chef's score for the final score, thus giving a total possible score of 90 points per team.
^19 Consisted of bacon, various breads, chicken eggs, maple syrup, orange juice, and pork sausage.
^20 Chosen to highlight grilling as a cooking method as part of Food Network's "Grillin' & Chillin'" Week. Peter Kelly’s brother James served as one of his sous chefs.

=== Season 5: 2007 ===
Episode	Show #	Iron Chef	Challenger	Challenger specialty	Secret ingredient(s) or theme	Winner	Final score
1	IA0502	Bobby Flay	Ben Ford	Regional American	Blue foot chicken	Bobby Flay	44–35
2	IA0508	Mario Batali	Tony Liu	Pan-European	Opah	Mario Batali	55–47
3	IA0509	Cat Cora	Alex Guarnaschelli	French-American	Farmers' Market	Cat Cora	45–41
4	IA0501	Mario Batali	Andrew Carmellini	Urban Italian	Parmigiano-Reggiano	Mario Batali	56–55
5	IA0504	Cat Cora	Mark Tarbell	Seasonal Organic	Apples	Mark Tarbell	50–44
6	IA0506	Bobby Flay	Kurt Boucher	French-American	Arctic char	Bobby Flay	46–39
7	IA0510	Mario Batali	Charles Clark	New American	Halibut	Mario Batali	51–50
8	IA0507	Cat Cora	Mary Dumont	French-American	Milk and cream	Cat Cora	51–46
9	IASP07	Michael Symon	Ricky Moore	Contemporary American	Traditional Thanksgiving	Michael Symon	51–43
10	IASP08	Cat Cora & Paula Deen	Tyler Florence & Robert Irvine	Southern (Deen), Contemporary American (Florence), International (Irvine)	Sugar	Cat Cora & Paula Deen	49–47
11	IA0503	Cat Cora	Todd Richards	Modern Southern	Carrots	Cat Cora	48–46
12	IA0505	Masaharu Morimoto	Fortunato Nicotra	Seasonal Italian	Kampachi	Masaharu Morimoto	59–50

^21Consisted of fresh ingredients purchased from the Green Market at Union Square in New York City, including a variety of winter vegetables, fruit and guinea fowl.
^22An ICA special based around Symon's debut battle as an Iron Chef.
^23Other than his preference for farm-fresh ingredients, no formal specialty was announced for Moore. This is the cuisine style attributed to Agraria in Washington, D.C., where Moore is executive chef.
^24Consisted of traditional American Thanksgiving staples: turkey, sweet potatoes, cranberries, corn, and pumpkin.
^25An ICA special which featured two teams of Food Network personalities facing off in a holiday dessert battle, with each team having one sous chef instead of the usual two.
^26First aired on Food Network on January 20, 2008, after the first two episodes of Season 6 were broadcast.

=== Season 6: 2008 ===
Episode	Show #	Iron Chef	Challenger	Challenger specialty	Secret ingredient(s) or theme	Winner	Final score
1	IA0601	Mario Batali	Jamie Oliver	Organic	Cobia	Mario Batali	50–47
2	IA0602	Michael Symon	Guy Rubino	Asian Fusion	Rabbit	Michael Symon	52–46
3	IA0603	Cat Cora	Alex Stupak	Pastry	Chocolate	Alex Stupak	49–46
4	IA0605	Bobby Flay	Kent & Kevin Rathbun	Contemporary Global (Kent) Steak (Kevin)	Elk	Kent & Kevin Rathbun	50–46
5	IA0607	Cat Cora	Lee Hillson	Mediterranean	Ham	Cat Cora	51–50
6	IA0608	Bobby Flay	Akira Back	Asian	Spinach	Bobby Flay	45–38
7	IA0604	Masaharu Morimoto	Tyson Cole	Contemporary Japanese	Ginger	Masaharu Morimoto	49–43
8	IA0610	Cat Cora	Ken Oringer	Contemporary Euro-Asian	Coffee	Ken Oringer	56–52
9	IA0612	Bobby Flay	Martin Rios	Traditional Southwestern	Tomato	Bobby Flay	52–41
10	IA0609	Bobby Flay	Bob Iacovone	Continental Creole	Langoustine	Bobby Flay	51–42
11	IA0611	Mario Batali	Paul Bartolotta	Mediterranean	Rice	Mario Batali	57–54
12	IA0606	Bobby Flay	Marcus Samuelsson	Scandinavian/Ethiopian	Corn	Bobby Flay	53–42
13	IA0616	Michael Symon	April Bloomfield	Seasonal British and Italian	Olive	April Bloomfield	56–53
14	IA0613	Masaharu Morimoto	Michael Cimarusti	French and Seafood	Blackfish	Michael Cimarusti	45–41
15	IA0614	Bobby Flay	Gabrielle Hamilton	Contemporary American	Zucchini	Gabrielle Hamilton	53–49
16	IA0617	Masaharu Morimoto	Tyson Wong Ophaso	Chinese	Curry	Masaharu Morimoto	53–44
17	IA0618	Bobby Flay	Jose Garces	Latin Spanish	Melon	Jose Garces	50–49
18	IA0615	Bobby Flay	Floyd Cardoz	New Indian	Snails	Bobby Flay	51–45

^27Oliver's sous chefs were Gennaro Contaldo, his mentor at London's Neal Street Restaurant and his "mate" Andrew Parkinson, also a trained chef, both of whom have previously appeared with him on his television programs.
^28First aired on Food Network on January 1, 2008, following a marathon replay of The Next Iron Chef.
^29First aired on Food Network Canada on February 10, 2008 as part of a chocolate-themed program marathon.
^30First aired during "Brain Freeze Week". In keeping with the theme, the Chairman stipulated each dish must include a frozen element.

=== Season 7: 2008–2009 ===
Episode	Show #	Iron Chef	Challenger	Challenger specialty	Secret ingredient(s) or theme	Winner	Final score
1	IA0703	Michael Symon	David Adjey	European	Sturgeon	Draw	47–47
2	IA0701	Bobby Flay	Daniel Angerer	European	Beer	Daniel Angerer	47–45
3	IA0702	Cat Cora	Art Smith	American organic with Southern influences	Cheddar cheese	Cat Cora	49–44
4	IA0704	Michael Symon	Chris Cosentino	"Nose-to-tail" rustic Italian	Offal	Michael Symon	46–38
5	IASP09	Bobby Flay and Michael Symon	Cat Cora and Masaharu Morimoto	Iron Chef	First Thanksgiving	Bobby Flay and Michael Symon	55–54
6	IASP10	Michael Symon	Cat Cora	Iron Chef	Chocolate	Michael Symon	52–45
7	IA0710	Michael Symon	Nate Appleman	Regional Italian/Pizza	Suckling pig	Michael Symon	52–50
8	IA0705	Bobby Flay	Sabrina Tinsley	Italian	Fresh beans	Bobby Flay	46–37
9	IA0711	Michael Symon	Fabio Trabocchi	Italian	Basil	Michael Symon	46–45
10	IA0714	Bobby Flay	Amanda Freitag	American	Alaskan king crab	Bobby Flay	50–49
11	IA0709	Cat Cora	Mourad Lahlou	Moroccan	Redfish	Mourad Lahlou	52–45
12	IA0708	Bobby Flay	David Kinch	Contemporary French	Cabbage	David Kinch	52–42
13	IA0712	Cat Cora	Koren Grieveson	Mediterranean	Butter	Draw	54–54
14	IA0707	Masaharu Morimoto	Sam Mason	Sweet/savory	Skirt steak	Masaharu Morimoto	53–46
15	IA0713	Michael Symon	Gavin Kaysen	Seasonal French	Octopus	Gavin Kaysen	55–50
16	IA0706	Bobby Flay	Phillipe Excoffier	French	Dorade	Bobby Flay	48–46
17	IA0723	Bobby Flay	Sue Torres	Mexican	Bananas	Bobby Flay	52–48
18	IA0717	Michael Symon	Akhtar Nawab	New American	Pineapple	Michael Symon	50–41
19	IA0716	Michael Symon	Francois Kwaku-Dongo	African/French	Artichoke	Michael Symon	50–45
20	IA0720	Cat Cora	Brad Farmerie	Freestyle Fusion	Maple syrup	Brad Farmerie	52–45
21	IA0715	Masaharu Morimoto	Jehangir Mehta	Indian	Coconut	Masaharu Morimoto	54–52
22	IASP12H	Michael Symon; Emily Tillman and Jacob Micale (apprentices)	Katelyn Remick (lead chef); Tyler Burke and Julie Fiedler (sous chefs)	World cuisines	Balsamic vinegar	Michael Symon; Emily Tillman and Jacob Micale	54–44
23	IA0722	Bobby Flay	Daisley Gordon	Contemporary French	Berries	Bobby Flay	56–50
24	IA0719	Masaharu Morimoto	Anthony Amoroso	Seafood	Branzino	Anthony Amoroso	49–47
25	IA0718	Cat Cora	David Walzog	Steak	Cherries	Cat Cora	48–45
26	IA0721	Masaharu Morimoto	Paul Virant	New American	Pheasant	Masaharu Morimoto	51–50
27	IA0724	Cat Cora	Charles Phan	Vietnamese	Almonds	Cat Cora	45–41
28	IASP13H	Bobby Flay & Shintaro Okamoto	Masaharu Morimoto & Takeo Okamoto	Iron Chef; Ice Sculpture	Eggnog with service on ice sculptures	Masaharu Morimoto & Takeo Okamoto	53–52

^31According to the program notes, Adjey and Symon were roommates at the Culinary Institute of America. Adjey is also a Food Network Canada personality as part of the series Restaurant Makeover.
^32Art Smith is the second Iron Chef America judge to later appear as a challenger, after Kerry Simon in season 2.
^33Cosentino was a competitor with Symon on the first The Next Iron Chef, and was previously defeated by Mario Batali in Battle Garlic.
^34A special Halloween episode, featuring organ meats (heart, kidney, sweetbreads, tripe, liver) from a variety of animals along with off-cuts such as pig's trotters and coxcomb. The episode also featured appearances by Igor and The Monster from the Broadway production of "Young Frankenstein."
^35This is the first episode in which the new Iron Chef jackets are worn.
^36Secret ingredients included duck, heritage turkey, venison, walnuts, Indian corn, lobster and leeks.
^37One of Amanda Freitag's sous chefs was Ariane Duarte, a contestant on the fifth season of Top Chef. Duarte is not a chef at Freitag's restaurant.
^38Kaysen was a former competitor on The Next Iron Chef; this was his first battle in Kitchen Stadium.
^39Takeo and Shintaro Okamoto previously appeared on Will Work for Food, training Adam Gertler to sculpt ice for an event.

=== Season 8: 2010 ===
Episode	Show #	Iron Chef	Challenger	Challenger specialty	Secret ingredient(s) or theme	Winner	Final score
1	IA0815H	Michael Symon & Michael Psilakis	Nicola & Fabrizio Carro	Greek (Psilakis), Classic Italian (Carro)	Lemons	Michael Symon & Michael Psilakis	77–70
2	IASP14H	Mario Batali & Emeril Lagasse	Bobby Flay & Cristeta Comerford	New Orleans (Lagasse), American (Comerford)	White House garden produce	Bobby Flay & Cristeta Comerford	55–50
3	IA0802H	Masaharu Morimoto	Dena Marino	Mediterranean	Figs	Masaharu Morimoto	49–41
4	IA0827H	Jose Garces	Rachel Yang and Seif Chirchi	Modern Korean/French/American	Hawaiian Moi	Jose Garces	51–50
5	IA0812H	Masaharu Morimoto	Sameh Wadi	Modern Middle Eastern	Mackerel	Masaharu Morimoto	57–52
6	IA0811H	Bobby Flay	Michael Smith	Regional Canadian	Avocado	Bobby Flay	54–40
7	IA0829H	Michael Symon	Duff Goldman	Cake	Chocolate and chiles	Michael Symon	56–48
8	IA0814H	Michael Symon	Spike Mendelsohn	Eclectic	Prosciutto	Michael Symon	55–45
9	IA0822H	Cat Cora	Julieta Ballesteros	French influenced Mexican	Ricotta	Cat Cora	55–46
10	IA0804H	Masaharu Morimoto	Maneet Chauhan	Latin/Indian fusion	Leeks	Masaharu Morimoto	56–40
11	IA0819H	Cat Cora	Holly Smith	Pacific Northwestern Italian	Grapes	Holly Smith	50–49
12	IA0810H	Masaharu Morimoto	Geoffrey Zakarian	American	Sardines	Masaharu Morimoto	57–43
13	IA0823H	Jose Garces	Kelly Liken	Seasonal American	Blue cheese	Jose Garces	53–48
14	IA0803H	Michael Symon	John Fraser	Local Seasonal	Cauliflower	Michael Symon	49–44
15	IA0809H	Bobby Flay	Curtis Stone	Natural organic	Skipjack tuna	Bobby Flay	49–37
16	IA0813H	Bobby Flay	Pierre Thiam	West African	Papaya	Bobby Flay	59–49
17	IA0818H	Michael Symon	Ed Brown	Modern American	Wahoo	Michael Symon	46–38
18	IA0816H	Michael Symon	Makoto Okuwa	Japanese	Uni	Michael Symon	56–43
19	IA0817H	Masaharu Morimoto	Maria Hines	Natural organic	Pacific cod	Maria Hines	51–46
20	IA0808H	Michael Symon	Dominique Crenn	French	Yogurt	Dominique Crenn	53–44
21	IA0807H	Masaharu Morimoto	Amanda Cohen	Vegetarian	Broccoli	Masaharu Morimoto	54–45
22	IA0820H	Cat Cora	Christopher Kostow	Seasonal Californian	Oatmeal	Christopher Kostow	55–54
23	IA0826H	Jose Garces	Naomi Pomeroy	French	Truffles	Jose Garces	40–37
24	IA0824H	Cat Cora	Seamus Mullen	Regional Spanish	Barracuda	Cat Cora	54–47
25	IA0828H	Jose Garces	Katsuya Fukushima and Ruben Garcia	Contemporary American	Mahi-Mahi	Katsuya Fukushima and Ruben Garcia	55–50
26	IA0805H	Michael Symon	Marc Vetri	Northern Italian	Veal	Marc Vetri	51–47
27	IA0825H	Cat Cora	Paul Miranda	American	Bourbon	Cat Cora	51–47
28	IA0821H	Jose Garces	Edward Lee	New American	Tongue and cheek	Edward Lee	53–48
29	IA0801H	Bobby Flay	Eric Greenspan	Bold American	Goose	Eric Greenspan	44–39
30	IA0830H	Michael Symon	Sean Brock	Modern American	Pork fat	Michael Symon	57–51
31	IA0806H	Masaharu Morimoto	John Sedlar	Modern Southwestern	Quail	Masaharu Morimoto	56–45

^40A twin-themed battle, featuring Michael Symon lookalike Psilakis (who previously lost to Cat Cora in Battle Puff Pastry), the twin Carro brothers, and twin judges Tia and Tamera Mowry.
^41There were four judges for this battle, thus a highest possible score of 80, as compared to normal episodes which have three judges and a highest possible score of 60.
^42First Lady Michelle Obama appeared as a special guest at the beginning of this two-hour episode, where she welcomed the chefs and announced the secret ingredient. Lagasse was referred to with the title ”Super Chef Lagasse” during the battle. This is also Mario Batali’s last battle as an Iron Chef, and the last battle featuring Batali as part of the regular cast; it was announced in September 2007 that Batali's contract with Food Network was not being renewed.
^43In Kitchen Stadium, the Chairman supplemented the secret ingredient with a range of locally and sustainably grown meats and seafood, along with goat cheese, eggs, cider vinegar and honey from the White House beehive.
^44Jose Garces' debut as Iron Chef, having won the second season of The Next Iron Chef competition. Yang and Chirchi had only one sous chef to adhere to the “three chefs to a kitchen” rule.
^45Michael Smith is the host of Food Network Canada's "Chef at Home".
^46Goldman is also the host of Food Network's Ace of Cakes. His experiences on ICA are included in Ace of Cakes episode DB0808L ("Charm City Throwdown"). Goldman's sous chefs were his former mentor, Jean Llapitan, and Shawn Aoki from the Palace Hotel, San Francisco.
^47Richard Blais, who previously competed against Iron Chef Batali in Battle Chickpeas, joins Cat Cora's team as a sous chef.
^48Holly Smith competed on the second season of The Next Iron Chef; this is her first battle in Kitchen Stadium
^49Zakarian appears regularly as a judge on Chopped (TV series).
^50Fraser requested permission to compete without sous chefs; Symon dismissed his upon learning Fraser was competing alone.
^51This battle was a special grill battle, where each dish was to include a grilled element.
^52Makoto Okuwa was a sous chef under Iron Chef Morimoto for several ICA episodes.
^53Dominique Crenn competed on the second season of The Next Iron Chef; this is her first battle in Kitchen Stadium
^54This episode was Iron Chef America's first vegetarian battle.
^55Seamus Mullen competed on the second season of The Next Iron Chef; this is his first battle in Kitchen Stadium.
^56Eric Greenspan competed on the second season of The Next Iron Chef; this is his first battle in Kitchen Stadium.

=== Season 9: 2010–2011 ===
A modification to the judging was made this season. At the end of each chef's presentation, the Chairman asked each judge to sum up their impressions of the chef's dishes, although not every episode includes this segment.

Episode	Show #	Iron Chef	Challenger	Challenger specialty	Secret ingredient(s) or theme	Winner	Final score
1	IA0916H	Marc Forgione	RJ Cooper	Mid-Atlantic regional	Bell pepper	Marc Forgione	54–45
2	IASP15H	Jose Garces	Mike Lata	Classic	Sparkling wine	Jose Garces	70–67
3	IA0910H	Michael Symon & Anne Burrell	Cat Cora & Robert Irvine	Italian (Burrell), International (Irvine)	Deep freeze (multiple courses with a specified ingredient, containing a frozen element)	Michael Symon & Anne Burrell	50–46
4	IA0902H	Bobby Flay	Chuck Hughes	Québécoise	Canadian lobster	Chuck Hughes	45–41
5	IA0914H	Marc Forgione	Nicholas Cantrel	French/Mediterranean	Gruyère cheese	Nicholas Cantrel	51–46
6	IA0917H	Jose Garces	Michael Solomonov	Israeli	Passion fruit	Jose Garces	75–59
7	IA0912H	Jose Garces	Julian Medina	Mexican	Mexican chocolate	Jose Garces	72–71
8	IA0909H	Michael Symon	Emma Hearst	Italian	Mozzarella	Michael Symon	53–48
9	IA0913H	Cat Cora	David Schneider	Greek	Leg of lamb	Cat Cora	55–46
10	IA0915H	Jose Garces	Vitaly Paley	Pacific Northwestern	Radish	Vitaly Paley	51–46
11	IA0903H	Masaharu Morimoto	David Pasternack	Italian-influenced Seafood	Wreckfish	Masaharu Morimoto	47–40
12	IA0908H	Bobby Flay	Todd Stein	Modern Italian	Mussels	Bobby Flay	49–48
13	IA0907H	Michael Symon	Roger Mooking	Mediterranean/Canadian fusion	Hot dogs	Michael Symon	74–61
14	IA0904H	Bobby Flay	Ashley Christensen	Southern	Chum salmon	Bobby Flay	45–35
15	IA0918H	Michael Symon	Wayne Johnson	Pacific Northwestern	Cucumber	Michael Symon	45–38
16	IA0905H	Masaharu Morimoto	Jet Tila	Pan-Asian	Seaweed	Masaharu Morimoto	55–51
17	IA0919H	Jose Garces	Cesare Casella	Italian	Hawaiian snapper	Jose Garces	60–54
18	IA0911H	Cat Cora	Robert Carter	Southern	Okra	Cat Cora	51–44
19	IA0901H	Bobby Flay	Walter Staib	Traditional American/Caribbean	Short ribs	Bobby Flay	69–45
20	IA0906H	Bobby Flay	Jason Knibb	"Earth-to-Table" Jamaican	Caviar	Bobby Flay	44–38

^57Marc Forgione's debut as an Iron Chef, having won season three of The Next Iron Chef. Forgione previously served as a sous chef for Laurent Tourondel in Battle Goat Cheese during Season 3.
^58^62^64^66^68There were four judges for this episode, thus a maximum possible score of 80.
^59Anne Burrell previously served as one of Mario Batali's sous chefs and hosted the Food Network series Secrets of a Restaurant Chef and Worst Cooks in America.
^60Iron Chef Cat Cora along with Paula Deen previously defeated Chef Robert Irvine along with Chef Tyler Florence in Battle Sugar.
^61Chuck Hughes is the host of the Cooking Channel's Chuck's Day Off.
^63Chef Medina's sous chef, J.C. Pavlovich, previously served as a sous chef for Iron Chef Bobby Flay in multiple battles.
^65At age 24, Hearst is the youngest challenger in series history.
^67Iron Chef Jose Garces was the first to receive a perfect score.

=== Season 10: 2011–2012 ===
Episode	Show #	Iron Chef	Challenger	Challenger specialty	Secret ingredient(s) or theme	Winner	Final score
1	IA1016H	Marc Forgione	Lee Anne Wong	Japanese	Halloween candy	Lee Anne Wong	52–51
2	IASP16H	Bobby Flay and Michael Symon	Jose Garces and Marc Forgione	Iron Chef	Thanksgiving feast	Bobby Flay and Michael Symon	59–54
3	IASP17H	Masaharu Morimoto	Michael Symon	Iron Chef	Alton Brown's fruitcake	Masaharu Morimoto	56–51
4	IA1018H	Marc Forgione	Nick Curtin	Contemporary American	Tilapia	Marc Forgione	52–49
5	IA1015H	Geoffrey Zakarian	Victor Casanova	Modern Italian	Brook trout	Geoffrey Zakarian	60–53
6	IA1006H	Bobby Flay and Marcela Valladolid	Masaharu Morimoto and Andrew Zimmern	Mexican (Valladolid), Bizarre foods (Zimmern)	Sea Whistle salmon	Bobby Flay and Marcela Valladolid	51–50
7	IA1023H	Jose Garces and Tony Abou-Ganim	Alexandra Raij and Charlotte Voisey	Contemporary Spanish	Tortillas and tequila	Jose Garces and Tony Abou-Ganim	83–66
8	IA1008H	Geoffrey Zakarian	Jonathan Sawyer	Head to tail/top to bottom	Mint	Geoffrey Zakarian	49–40
9	IASP18H	Masaharu Morimoto	Michael Symon	Iron Chef	Wild boar	Michael Symon	52–48
10	IA1017H	Masaharu Morimoto	Justin Bogle	Contemporary American	Paiche	Masaharu Morimoto	60–43
11	IA1004H	Bobby Flay	Chris Hastings	Contemporary Southern	Sausage	Chris Hastings	53–52
12	IA1012H	Forgione Brothers (Marc and Bryan)	Campanaro Brothers (Joey and Lou)	Italian American	Parmigiano-Reggiano	Forgione Brothers	53–43
13	IA1001H	Michael Symon	Takashi Yagihashi	Japanese/French	Eggs	Michael Symon	53–51
14	IA1002H	Bobby Flay	Alain Allegretti	French	Canned tuna	Bobby Flay	51–41
15	IA1003H	Jose Garces	Madison Cowan	International	Kale	Madison Cowan	53–48
16	IA1024H	Geoffrey Zakarian	Michael Ferraro	Comfort Food	Peaches	Geoffrey Zakarian	55–42
17	IA1020H	Masaharu Morimoto	Marc Forgione	Iron Chef	Mangalitsa pig	Masaharu Morimoto	50–48

Episode	Show #	Iron Chef 1	Iron Chef 2	Iron Chef 3	Secret ingredient	Winner	Final score
18	IASP19H	Cat Cora/CS1 Michael Downey, USN	Masaharu Morimoto/LCPL Eva Castillo, USMC	Michael Symon/SPC Oscar Alvarado, USA	Ahi	Michael Symon/SPC Oscar Alvarado, USA	53(S)–51(M)–48(C)

Episode	Show #	Iron Chef	Challenger	Challenger specialty	Secret ingredient(s) or theme	Winner	Final score
19	IA1010H	Jose Garces	Franklin Becker	Contemporary American	Haddock	Jose Garces	55–50
20	IA1013H	Bobby Flay	Joe Isidori	Sustainable seafood	Strip steak	Bobby Flay	55–50
21	IA1007H	Michael Symon	Jesus Nunez	Modern Spanish	Octopus	Michael Symon	69–68
22	IA1022H	Marc Forgione and Charlotte Voisey	Shawn McClain and Tony Abou-Ganim	Contemporary American	Tropical ingredients	Shawn McClain and Tony Abou-Ganim	83–78
23	IA1011H	Geoffrey Zakarian	Jesse Schenker	Modern American	Plantains	Jesse Schenker	53–52
24	IA1005H	Michael Symon	Stephanie Izard	Modern American	Bread	Michael Symon	56–52
25	IA1009H	Marc Forgione	Andrew Zimmerman	Modern American	Cream cheese	Andrew Zimmerman	49–47
26	IA1021H	Geoffrey Zakarian	Shea Gallante	Italian	Pasta	Shea Gallante	53–50
27	IA1019H	Geoffrey Zakarian	Eduard Frauneder	Contemporary Austrian	Yak	Eduard Frauneder	47–46
28	IA1014H	Jose Garces	Rebecca Weitzman	Mediterranean American	Silkie chicken	Jose Garces	57–45

^69Chef Lee Anne Wong appears on Cooking Channel's "Unique Eats".
^70The fruitcake used in the episode was Alton Brown's "Free Range Fruitcake" from the Good Eats episode "It's a Wonderful Cake".
^71Zakarian's debut as an Iron Chef, having won season four of The Next Iron Chef. Iron Chef Zakarian received a perfect score.
^72Chef Marcela Valladolid appear as the host of the Food Network show Mexican Made Easy. Chef Andrew Zimmern appears on Travel Channel's series Bizarre Foods with Andrew Zimmern and Andrew Zimmern's Bizarre World.
^73Sea Whistle salmon is sustainably farmed salmon raised off the coasts of Scotland and Ireland in the North Atlantic.
^74Each judge could award a maximum of 30 points, 20 for food and 10 for the paired cocktails, for a maximum possible score of 90 points.
^75Chef Jonathan Sawyer was a sous chef under Iron Chef Michael Symon for several ICA episodes.
^76This battle was a special Tailgate Showdown battle. Each chef prepared five dishes to be prepared and served in the manner of tailgating. The battle was held at the Marine Corps Base Hawaii at Kane'ohe Bay, Oahu.
^77Chef Joey Campanaro previously lost to Iron Chef Cat Cora in Battle Venison; his brother Lou served as one of his sous chefs in the battle.
^78Chef Madison Cowan previously appeared on Chopped, and is the first Chopped Grand Champion. His sous chefs were fellow Chopped competitor Lance Nitahara and Chopped judge Amanda Freitag, who competed against Iron Chef Jose Garces in The Next Iron Chef.
^79 A special three-way battle in which each Iron Chef was paired with a chef from a branch of the U.S. military. The battle was held at the U. S. Marine Base Hawaii at Kane'ohe Bay, Oahu. Each team made only three dishes instead of the usual five.
^80 Iron Chef Symon also battled in the previous Battle Octopus, which he lost.
^81 There were four judges for this episode, thus a maximum possible score of 80.

^82 Ingredients included whelk, hearts of palm, coconuts and drinking coconuts, pineapple and mango. Each dish was paired with a cocktail. Each judge could award a maximum of 30 points, 20 for food and 10 for the paired cocktails, for a maximum possible score of 90 points.

=== Season 11: 2012–2013 ===
Starting in Season 11, the first dish is due to the judges 20 minutes after the start of the battle. Additionally, a culinary curveball—an ingredient, piece of equipment, or plating device—is announced by the chairman part way through the battle. Each chef is required to integrate the item into at least one of their remaining dishes, and receives scoring from the judges based on the item's use. Up to 30 points are awarded for taste, 15 for plating, 15 for creativity, 15 for the first dish, and 15 for use of the culinary curveball, for a possible total of 90 points.

Episode	Show #	Iron Chef	Challenger	Challenger specialty	Secret ingredient(s) or theme	"Culinary curveball"	Winner	Final score
1	IASP20H	Michael Symon, Marc Forgione and Geoffrey Zakarian	Aarón Sanchez, Scott Conant and Marc Murphy	Mexican (Sanchez), Italian (Conant), French-American (Murphy)	Thanksgiving leftovers	Liquid nitrogen	Michael Symon, Marc Forgione and Geoffrey Zakarian	113–100
2	IASP21H	Food Network: Masaharu Morimoto, Robert Irvine and Ted Allen	The Cooking Channel: Michael Symon, Nadia G, Ben Sargent	International (Irvine), American (Allen), Contemporary (Nadia G), Seafood (Sargent)	Gingerbread	Eggnog	Food Network	82–78
3	IA1111H	Alex Guarnaschelli	Judy Joo	French	Mortadella	Ebelskiver pan	Alex Guarnaschelli	80–75
4	IA1101H	Bobby Flay	Viet Pham	Modern American	Ground meat	Shrimp	Viet Pham	80–73
5	IA1120H	Geoffrey Zakarian	Michael Chiarello	Regional Italian	Scotch whisky	Scotch bonnet chile	Geoffrey Zakarian	78–70
6	IA1114H	Marc Forgione	Ian Kittichai	Modern Thai	Tea	Coffee beans	Marc Forgione	78–69
7	IA1102H	Michael Symon	Celina Tio	Modern American	Plums	Melon baller	Michael Symon	88–75
8	IA1112H	Masaharu Morimoto	Homaru Cantu	Molecular gastronomy	Herring	Distilled white vinegar	Masaharu Morimoto	89–67
9	IA1103H	Bobby Flay	Micah Wexler	Contemporary Mediterranean	Wild striped bass	Smoking gun	Bobby Flay	79–74
10	IA1105H	Bobby Flay	Hong Thaimee	Thai	Tamarind	Almonds	Bobby Flay	72–65
11	IA1118H	Jose Garces	Russell Jackson	Subculture Cuisine	Rhubarb	Apple juice	Jose Garces	71–62

==== Iron Chef America Tournament of Champions ====
In this first ever Iron Chef vs. Iron Chef tournament, the four newest Chefs compete to take on either Iron Chef Symon or Iron Chef Morimoto, with the winners of those battles going head-to-head. Bobby Flay served as head judge in the finale.

Episode	Show#	Round	Iron Chef #1	Iron Chef #2	Secret ingredient(s) or theme	"Culinary curveball"	Winner	Final score
12	IA1106H	1	Geoffrey Zakarian	Alex Guarnaschelli	Potato chips	French press	Geoffrey Zakarian	83–76
13	IA1104H	1	Marc Forgione	Jose Garces	Peanut butter and jelly	Straws	Jose Garces	79–66
14	IA1108H	2	Geoffrey Zakarian	Michael Symon	Wings	Peanuts	Michael Symon	82–76
15	IA1107H	2	Masaharu Morimoto	Jose Garces	Liver	Electric juicer	Jose Garces	79–75
16	IA1110H	3	Michael Symon	Jose Garces	Pretzels	Blow torch	Michael Symon	79–74

==== Season 11, continued ====
Episode	Show#	Iron Chef	Challenger	Challenger specialty	Secret ingredient(s) or theme	"Culinary curveball"	Winner	Final score
17	IA1109H	Bobby Flay	Michael Voltaggio	Modern American	Iberico pork	Anti-griddle	Bobby Flay	83–77
18	IA1113H	Alex Guarnaschelli	Robert Clark	Seafood	Mascarpone	Skewers	Alex Guarnaschelli	82–78
19	IA1115H	Geoffrey Zakarian	Dale Talde	Asian American	Sesame	Pastry bags	Geoffrey Zakarian	71–62
20	IA1119H	Jose Garces	Jamie Bissonnette	Italian-Spanish	Pistachios	Beer	Jose Garces	81–73
21	IA1116H	Alex Guarnaschelli	Stephen Kalt	International	Jerky	Mason jars	Stephen Kalt	81–78
22	IA1117H	Larry & Marc Forgione	Jonathan Waxman	New American	Peas	Amaretti	Larry & Marc Forgione	74–68

^83 Chefs Aaron Sanchez, Scott Conant and Marc Murphy appear regularly as a judges on Chopped (TV series). Chef Aarón Sanchez previously tied Iron Chef Masaharu Morimoto in Battle Black Bass (Season 2), and Chef Marc Murphy previously lost to Iron Chef Bobby Flay in Battle Breakfast (Season 4).
^84This battle features three chefs representing Food Network versus three chefs representing The Cooking Channel. Chef Irvine has appeared twice previously on Iron Chef America, as well as competing in The Next Iron Chef season 4. Ted Allen is the host of Chopped, and a regular judge on Iron Chef America. Nadia G. hosts Bitchin' Kitchen, and Ben Sargent hosts Hook, Line and Dinner on The Cooking Channel.
^85This battle is Guarnaschelli's debut as an Iron Chef, having won season 5 of The Next Iron Chef. She served as a sous chef for Iron Chef Geoffrey Zakarian during season 10. Chef Judy Joo appears as an Iron Chef on Iron Chef UK and was a judge on the fourth season of "The Next Iron Chef", in which Iron Chef Guarnaschelli previously competed.
^86Chef Kittichai previously lost to Iron Chef Batali in Battle Lentils in season 3. Chef Kittichai appears as an Iron Chef on Iron Chef Thailand.
^87Chef Tio was a participant in season three of "The Next Iron Chef", in which Iron Chef Symon was a Judge.
^88This is a rematch between Iron Chef Morimoto and Chef Cantu. In Battle Beet, Chef Cantu defeated IC Morimoto by one point.
^89Iron Chef Forgione served as the sous chef for his father during this match.

=== Season 12: 2013–2014 ===
Episode	Show #	Iron Chef	Challenger	Challenger specialty	Secret ingredient(s) or theme	"Culinary curveball"	Winner	Final score
1	IA1203H	Michael Symon & Geoffrey Zakarian	Bernhard Mairinger	German and Austrian cuisine	Oktoberfest	Dried hops	Michael Symon & Geoffrey Zakarian	77–75
2	IA1211H	Geoffrey Zakarian & Alex Guarnaschelli	Spike Mendelsohn & Marcel Vigneron	French and Molecular gastronomy	Scary Halloween combinations	Trick and treat: Spaetzle press (Trick: Challengers), Black truffle (Treat: Iron Chefs)	Geoffrey Zakarian & Alex Guarnaschelli	83–78
3	IA1205H	Bobby Flay & Michael Symon	Geoffrey Zakarian & Alex Guarnaschelli	Modern American (Zakarian); American market garden (Guarneschelli)	Thanksgiving ingredients from the past and present	Escargot, grapes and parsley	Bobby Flay & Michael Symon	84–82

Episode	Show #	Iron Chef 1	Iron Chef 2	Iron Chef 3	Secret ingredient	"Culinary curveball"	Winner	Final score
4	IA1210H	Michael Symon & Ching-He Huang	Masaharu Morimoto & G. Garvin	Jose Garces & Bobby Deen	Ghosts of Holiday Ingredients Past	Holiday gifts	Jose Garces with Bobby Deen	76(G)–73(S)–70(M)

Episode	Show #	Iron Chef 1	Iron Chef 2	Secret ingredient(s) or theme	"Culinary curveball"	Winner	Final score
5	IA1201H	Bobby Flay & Jose Garces	Masaharu Morimoto & Geoffrey Zakarian	Frozen foods, served on plates made of ice	None	Bobby Flay & Jose Garces	69–62
6	IA1204H	Michael Symon & Marc Forgione	Masaharu Morimoto & Jose Garces	Game day party food	Beer helmets	Michael Symon & Marc Forgione	84–79

Episode	Show #	Iron Chef	Challenger	Challenger specialty	Secret ingredient(s) or theme	"Culinary curveball"	Winner	Final score
7	IA1206H	Bobby Flay	Angelo Sosa	Asian	Las Vegas luxury foods	Cotton candy machine	Bobby Flay	84–67
8	IA1202ZH	Bobby Flay, Marc Forgione & Alex Guarnaschelli	Adrian Richardson, Darren Robertson & Tobie Puttock	Meat, French Japanese, Italian	Surf and turf	Table top grills	Bobby Flay, Marc Forgione and Alex Guarnaschelli	84–83
9	IA1209ZH	Alex Guarnaschelli & Johnny Iuzzini	Geoffrey Zakarian & Elizabeth Falkner	Dessert	Dessert luau	Ice cream bicycles	Alex Guarnaschelli & Johnny Iuzzini	84–79
10	IA1208ZH	Bobby Flay & Anthony Anderson	Masaharu Morimoto & Simon Majumdar	Professional + amateur	Bar food	zesting machines	Masaharu Morimoto & Simon Majumdar	89–82
11	IA1207ZH	Alex Guarnaschelli & Jeremy Oertel	Mark Forgione & Natasha David	Iron Chefs + Bartenders	It's a Mad, Mad, Mad, Mad 60s Meal	powdered orange drink	Marc Forgione & Natasha David	77–76

^90 Chef Spike Mendelsohn previously lost to Iron Chef Michael Symon in Battle Prosciutto in season 8.
^91 The secret ingredient consisted of five "scary" pairs of ingredient: avocado and coffee, chile and vanilla, pickle and peanut butter, mushrooms and apricots, and marrow bones and fruit candy. The chefs were required to prepare one dish using each combination of ingredients. The Culinary Curveball consisted of one trick and one treat hidden from the chefs' view; the challengers, having won the first dish, were given first choice of ingredient and chose the trick.
^92 The secret ingredient consisted of the chairman's favorite ingredients from past holiday competitions: fruitcake, gingerbread, egg nog, and champagne.
^93 The curveball consisted of three different presents. The winning team from the first dish picked first and got apple cider. The other two teams got candy canes and popcorn.
^94 Each of the dishes prepared must be eaten with one hand. The ingredients include artificial cheese, hero rolls, and hot dogs.
^95The secret ingredient consisted of caviar, wagyu beef, oysters, Maine lobsters, champagne, chocolate and truffles.
^96The secret ingredient included shrimp, octopus, prosciutto, and beef.
^97Chef Elizabeth Falkner previously lost to Iron Chef Cat Cora in Battle Honey in season 3.
^98The secret ingredient included suckling pig, tuna, lichee, coconut, banana, pineapple, papaya, and Kona coffee from which the chefs must create five desserts. The chefs were required to use five of the ingredients from the table and no butter or sugar in the first dish.
^99 The secret ingredient includes gin, vermouth, tequila, pork rinds, cherries, and olives. It also includes anything found at a bar.
^100 The episode theme is a play on the 1960s film "It's a Mad, Mad, Mad, Mad World" and the secret ingredient includes: water chesnuts, Granny Smith apples, iceberg lettuce, kumquats and more. Each dish had to have a take on drinks from the 1960s.

=== Iron Chef Showdown ===
Iron Chef returned to Food Network on November 8, 2017 as a ten episode series called Iron Chef Showdown. Iron Chefs Bobby Flay, Jose Garces, Alex Guarnaschelli, and Michael Symon return for this series; they are joined by the newest Iron Chef, Iron Chef Gauntlet winner Stephanie Izard. Iron Chef Showdown featured several rules differences from Iron Chef America and is therefore considered a series of its own rather than the thirteenth season of Iron Chef America. Iron Chef America would return to the air six months later, in May 2018.

=== Season 13: 2018 ===
Food Network announced that Iron Chef America would return in its original format, with new episodes beginning May 20, 2018. Two format changes implemented in Iron Chef Showdown were retained: the number of judges has been reduced to two, and there is no Culinary Curveball.

Each judge can award up to 25 points: 10 for flavor, 5 for plating, 5 for creativity, and 5 for the first dish, for a total of 50 points. Alongside the judges, the Chairman sits at judge's table during judging. This season Jet Tila serves as the floor reporter, succeeding Kevin Brauch and Jaymee Sire.

Episode	Show #	Iron Chef	Challenger	Challenger specialty	Secret ingredient(s) or theme	Winner	Final score
1		Alex Guarnaschelli	Brittanny Anderson	German/American	Blue cheese	Alex Guarnaschelli	44–40
2		Stephanie Izard	Victoria Blamey	Contemporary American	Wagyu beef	Stephanie Izard	44–37
3		Geoffrey Zakarian	Ari Taymor	Coastal California	Carrots	Ari Taymor	42–39
4		Marc Forgione	Thai Dang	Progressive Vietnamese	Swordfish	Marc Forgione	47–42
5		Alex Guarnaschelli	Douglass Williams	Italian	Pea	Alex Guarnaschelli	41–32
6		Stephanie Izard	Erik Battes	French/Mediterranean	Olive	Stephanie Izard	42–41
7		Geoffrey Zakarian	Fernando Darin	Modern American	Artichoke	Geoffrey Zakarian	45–41
8		Alex Guarnaschelli	Justin Sutherland	World Cuisine	Lamb	Justin Sutherland	40–35
9		Geoffrey Zakarian	Lee Wolen	Contemporary American	Clam	Geoffrey Zakarian	44–41
10		Jose Garces	Carolynn Spence	Local Seasonal Seafood	Crab	Jose Garces	44–34

^101 As an additional requirement, at least one ingredient or element of each dish was required to be grilled.
^113 Michael Laiskonis, who lost to Batali in battle Chocolate and Coconut in Season 1, served as a sous chef for Garces in this battle.

== Win–loss records ==
The winning percentage for Iron Chefs participating on Iron Chef America is an average. The win/loss data is based solely on the performance of the participant as an Iron Chef in Iron Chef America: The Series and the Battle of the Masters but does not include the results from Iron Chef Showdown.

Iron Chef	Seasons	Specialty	Win	Loss	Draw	Total	Win %
Mario Batali (retired)	BOM, 1–6	Italian	19	5	0	24	79.2%
Cat Cora (retired)	1–10	Greek/Aegean	21	12	1	34	63.2%
Bobby Flay (semi-retired)	BOM, 1–12	Southwestern	43	16	2	61	72.1%
Marc Forgione	9–13	New American	8	7	0	15	53.3%
Jose Garces	8–13	Latin Spanish	16	7	0	23	69.6%
Alex Guarnaschelli	11–13	Modern American	7	5	0	12	58.3%
Stephanie Izard	13	Modern American	2	0	0	2	100.0%
Masaharu Morimoto	BOM, 1–13	Japanese	26	17	1	44	60.2%
Wolfgang Puck (retired)	BOM	California	1	0	0	1	100.0%
Michael Symon	5–13	Mediterranean/American	34	7	1	42	82.1%
Geoffrey Zakarian	10–13	Modern American	11	8	0	19	57.9%

^101 Based on weighted average (.5 victory for a draw). The win/loss data is based on the performance of the Iron Chef in Iron Chef America: The Series and the Battle of the Masters.
^102 Flay retired as Iron Chef at the end of Iron Chef Showdown.
^103 Forgione's record does not include his service as a sous chef to challenger Laurent Tourondel, who prevailed over Flay in Battle Goat Cheese, nor Forgione's victory over Marco Canora in the finale of The Next Iron Chef, as Forgione did not hold the title Iron Chef during either battle.
^104 Garces' record does not include his defeat of Flay in Battle Melon, or his victory over Jehangir Mehta in the finale of The Next Iron Chef, as Garces did not hold the title Iron Chef during either battle.
^105 Guarnaschelli's record does not include her loss to Cora in Battle Farmer's Market, or her victory over Amanda Freitag in the finale of The Next Iron Chef, as Guarnaschelli did not hold the title Iron Chef during either battle.
^106 Morimoto's record includes his battles against Batali, Puck, and Sakai as a competitor in the Battle of the Masters. It does not include his 16–7–1 record in the original Iron Chef during his tenure as the third Iron Chef Japanese.
^107 Symon's record does not include his loss to Morimoto in Battle Asparagus, or his victory over John Besh in the finale of The Next Iron Chef, as Symon did not hold the title Iron Chef during either battle.
^108 Zakarian's record does not include his loss to Morimoto in Battle Sardines, or his victory over Elizabeth Falkner in the finale of The Next Iron Chef, as Zakarian did not hold the title Iron Chef during either battle.
^109 Izard's record does not include her victories in Iron Chef Gauntlet, as Izard did not hold the title Iron Chef at that time, nor her 2–0 record on Iron Chef Showdown.
