= Hot and Hot Fish Club =

Restaurant in Birmingham, Alabama, U.S.

Coordinates: 33.5164°N 86.7905°W

- Interactive map of Hot and Hot Fish Club

Restaurant information
- Established: 1995
- Owners: Chris and Idie Hastings
- Chef: Chris Hastings
- Food type: California, French, and Southern
- Location: 2901 2nd Avenue South, Birmingham, Alabama, 35233, United States
- Website: www.hotandhotfishclub.com

Hot and Hot Fish Club is a restaurant in Birmingham, Alabama, United States. Founded by Chris Hastings and his wife Idie in 1995, it was relocated to another business plaza in January 2020.

== Description ==
Designed by Liz Hand Woods, the space contains a private dining room and an open kitchen.

=== Menu ===
Hot and Hot Fish Club serves California, French, and Southern cuisine. Their menu contains a tomato salad.

== History ==
In 1995, Chris Hastings and his wife, Idie, opened Hot and Hot Fish Club at 2180 11th Court South, in a space previously occupied by a dive bar named Upside Down Plaza and a burger joint named Caddell's Creamery. Due to their retail center, Highland Plaza, being purchased in 2018, the restaurant had to relocate by June 2020. In January 2020, Hot and Hot Fish Club reopened in the Pepper Place Entertainment District at 2901 Second Avenue, near the couple's second restaurant, OvenBird.
