= David Burke (chef) =

American chef and restaurateur

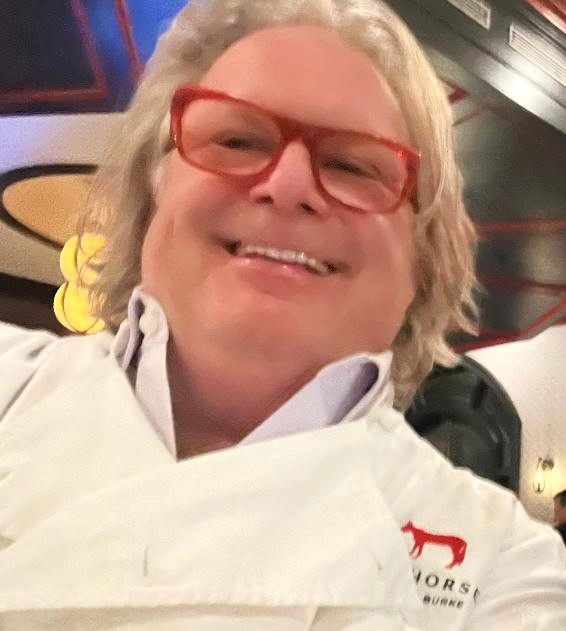
- Burke in 2023
- Born: February 27, 1962 (age 64); Brooklyn, New York, U.S.
- Education: Culinary Institute of America
- Culinary career
- Current restaurants: David Burke Tavern; Woodpecker by David Burke; Drifthouse by David Burke; The King Bar and Red Salt Room by David Burke; David Burke Kitchen; David Burke Prime Steakhouse; Burke In The Box; BLT Prime by David Burke; Grand Tavern by David Burke; Ventanas; 1776 on the Green; The GOAT; SECOND; Red Horse (Bernardsville, NJ); Red Horse (Rumson, NJ); Red Horse (White Plains, NY); Fox and Falcon by David Burke; Double Barrel Steak by Chef David Burke
- Previous restaurants: David Burke Townhouse; Fishtail; David Burke at Bloomingdale's; David Burke Modern American Cuisine; Cloudbar & Redsalt By David Burke; David Burke's Primehouse; Fromagerie; David Burke Fabrick; Grillhouse by David Burke; ONE CPS; David Burke at Orange Lawn
- Television shows: Iron Chef America; Top Chef Masters
- Awards won: Meilleurs Ouvriers de France Diplome d’Honneur; Nippon Award for Excellence; Robert Mondavi Award of Excellence; August Escoffier Award; Distinguished Visiting Chef Award (Johnson & Wales University); Menu Masters Award
- Website: www.chefdavidburke.com

David Burke (born February 27, 1962) is an American chef and restaurateur, known for his appearance on the reality TV program Iron Chef America.

== Early life ==
Born in Brooklyn NY and raised in Hazlet, New Jersey, Burke is a graduate of the Culinary Institute of America and was a student at Culinary Institute Lenôtre in Plaisir, France. When Burke was 26, he received 3 stars from the New York Times at River Café. Burke was then chosen by his peers to represent the US at The International Culinary Competition, where he won France's Meilleurs Ouvriers de France Diplome d’Honneur. Burke also won the Nippon Award for Excellence from the government of Japan, for overall skill and technique. Burke remained at The River Café until 1992.

== Career ==
In 1992, Burke opened the Park Avenue Café with Smith & Wollensky CEO Alan Stillman, becoming vice president of culinary development for the Smith & Wollensky Restaurant Group four years later. In 2003, Burke branched out on his own to start his first proprietary restaurant, davidburke & donatella. Since then, he has set up establishments in Chicago, Foxwoods Casino (CT), Las Vegas and in Rumson, NJ, as well as New York City.

As the principal of David Burke Hospitality Management, he operates or oversees the culinary direction of 20 restaurants in New York, New Jersey, North Carolina, and in Saudi Arabia. In May 2022 Burke purchased the Dixie Lee Bakery in Keansburg, NJ.

Burke has appeared on television, including two seasons of Top Chef Masters, a guest spot on the Every Day with Rachael Ray show, NBC's TODAY Show and Bloomberg's small-business television series "The Mentor". He has published two cookbooks, Cooking With David Burke (1999) and David Burke's New American Classics (2006) co-written by Judith Choate.

Burke was featured once during the second season of Iron Chef America in 2005, he lost to Bobby Flay. In 2010, he was a competitor on the second season of Top Chef Masters, but did not move on to the Champions' Rounds.

Burke also competed on Top Chef Masters Season 5. He was eliminated on Episode 9 in the Teacher Tribute challenge with his Bittersweet Chocolate Soufflé with Orange Peel & Raspberry Sauce.

At the BLT Prime in the Trump International Hotel Washington, D.C., Burke has cooked steak for President Donald Trump, and disputed allegations that the President ate his steak with ketchup. He was rumored to be under consideration for the post of White House Executive Chef, but has said that he would likely not be interested in the position.

== Restaurants ==
Burke operates twenty restaurants in New Jersey, New York and North Carolina. Those include:

- David Burke Tavern (New York City, NY)
- Drifthouse by David Burke (Seabright New Jersey)
- The King Bar and Red Salt Room by David Burke (Garden City Hotel, Garden City, NY)
- Ventanas (Fort Lee, NJ)
- 1776 on the Green by David Burke (Morristown, NJ)
- G.O.A.T. Pizza (Cornelius, NC)
- The GOAT (Union Beach, NJ)
- Red Horse by David Burke at the Bernardsville Inn (Bernardsville, New Jersey)
- Red Horse by David Burke (Rumson, NJ)
- Red Horse by David Burke (White Plains, NY)
- Fox and Falcon by David Burke (South Orange, NJ)
- Port City Club by David Burke (Cornelius, NC)
- Park Ave Kitchen by David Burke (New York, NY)
- David Burke KSA (Riyadh, Saudi Arabia)

== Awards ==
Burke has received Japan's Nippon Award of Excellence, the Robert Mondavi Award of Excellence and the CIA's August Escoffier Award. Nation's Restaurant News named Burke one of the 50 Top R&D Culinarians and Time Out New York named him the "Best Culinary Prankster" in 2003. In May 2009, the James Beard Foundation inducted Burke into the "Who's Who of Food & Beverage in America" and Nation's Restaurant News presented him with the Menu Masters award. In February 2012, Burke was honored by the culinary school at Johnson & Wales University with the Distinguished Visiting Chef Award. In November 2012, he was named Restaurateur of the Year by the New Jersey Restaurant Association. In the same month, he was honored with a Concierge Choice Award, celebrating the elite in New York City hospitality, winning the best chef award. And in 2013, the David Burke Group was described by Restaurant Hospitality magazine as having one of the "Coolest Multiconcept Companies in the Land".

Other awards include:

- 1991 Chefs in America - "Chef of the Year"
- 1995 Culinary Institute of America - "Auggie Award"
- 1996 & 1997 Robert Mondavi - "Culinary Award of Experience"
- 1998 The Vatel Club - "Chef of the Year"
- 1998 Chef Magazine - "Chef of the Year"
- 2023 Honorary Doctorate from Johnson & Wales

== Products ==
Burke is also responsible for the creation of several innovations and new techniques used by not only himself, but other restaurants. A few of those include Pastrami Salmon in 1988, flavored oils and tuna tartare and GourmetPops, ready-to-serve cheesecake lollipops. Additionally, Burke is involved with culinology, an approach to food that blends the culinary arts and food technology. In 2011, Burke received a United States patent for a process which uses pink Himalayan salt to dry-age steaks. Burke is also responsible for Burke Flavor Spray and Flavor Magic.
