= Sue Torres =

American chef and television personality (born c. 1973)

Sue Torres (born c. 1973) is an American chef and television personality.

== Early career ==
Torres studied at the Culinary Institute of America where upon graduation, she worked as a sous-chef at Arizona 206 under chef Miles Angelo. It was during this time she claims she discovered her love for chiles. As Torres' love for Mexican food flourished, she accepted the position of head chef at Rocking Horse Café Mexicano at the age of 23. Her tenure at the restaurant received rave reviews from New York Times food critic Eric Asimov, describing it as "the most exciting Mexican food in the city."

== Career ==
Torres opened her own Mexican restaurant, Sueños (literally "dreams" in Spanish) in 2003. The restaurant was critically acclaimed for its Mexican dishes and margaritas, which made Bon Appétit Magazine's "Best Cocktail List" of 2004. Suenos was listed in Vogue's "Taster's Choice" 2004 by food critic and frequent Iron Chef America judge Jeffery Steingarten as one of the "lasting four monuments of 2003." Torres says her rule of conduct that is most enforced is to "never skimp" on quality ingredients and that her most valuable kitchen tools are her hands and the tortilla press. Torres has cited her mother as a "wonderful and resourceful cook" who taught her to always "be patient," "put love into her food" and to use "nothing but the best" ingredients. Sueños closed permanently on March 23, 2014.

Torres, the daughter of a Puerto Rican father and Italian mother, has no ancestral connection to Mexico but has stated that "her heart is Mexican" regarding her interest in Mexican cuisine.

Torres's cuisine has been recognized by Food & Wine and Working Woman's list of "20 Women Under 30" to watch out for. She has made guest appearances on shows such as The Martha Stewart Show, and The Rachael Ray Show, and Iron Chef America.

Torres has also appeared on the Food Network's competition series show Chopped as a judge. Torres has also recently appeared in commercials for the Norwegian supermarket chain REMA 1000 where she advertises Mexican food along with Norwegian topchef Erling Sundal.

== See also ==
- Chef
- Mexican cuisine
- List of Chopped episodes
