= David Myers (American chef) =

American chef and television personality

David Myers is an American chef, television personality, and restaurateur. Myers is based in Los Angeles, but works in his restaurants in Tokyo, Singapore, Hong Kong, and Dubai.

== Biography ==
David Myers was born in Boston, grew up in Canton. Prior to moving to Los Angeles, Myers worked for Charlie Trotter in Chicago and Daniel Boulud in New York City.

in 2002, Myers opened his first restaurant Sona in Los Angeles, which went on to earn a Michelin star. In 2003, Food & Wine magazine awarded Myers the “Best New Chef” award. Along with accolades such as James Beard nominations for Rising Star Chef and Best Chef – Pacific in 2008 and 2009, and Restaurant of the Year by Angeleno magazine.

Myers subsequently opened Pizzeria Ortica in Costa Mesa; French bistro Comme Ҫa in Los Angeles and Las Vegas; the David Myers Café in Tokyo; Sola, a patisserie in Tokyo; and Hinoki & The Bird in Los Angeles. Myers has also opened Adrift in Singapore, Salt Water in Tokyo, AnOther Place in Hong Kong, Salt Water Kitchen in Nagoya; and 72 Degrees in Ginza. In 2017, Myers opened BASTA!, Bleu Blanc and Poppy at the Renaissance Downtown Hotel in Dubai.

Myers has made numerous television appearances on shows such as Iron Chef America, The Today Show, The Early Show, MSNBC's Your Business, Top Chef, Master Chef US, Master Chef China and Hell's Kitchen.

Myers was previously married to pastry chef Michelle Myers, who had worked at their pastry shop Boule in Los Angeles.

== Restaurants ==
=== Active ===
- Hinoki + the Bird, Century City, Los Angeles (2013– )
- Adrift by David Myers, Marina Bay Sands, Singapore (2015– )
- Adrift, Tokyo, Japan (2019– )
- Adrift Burger Bar, Venice Beach, Los Angeles (2020– )
- AnOther Place, Hong Kong (2016– )
- Salt Water by David Myers (formerly Salt Water Kitchen), Nagoya, Japan

=== Closed ===
- Sona, Los Angeles (2002–2010)
- Boule, Los Angeles (2006–2007)
- Comme Ça, West Hollywood, Los Angeles (2007–2015)
- Boule Atelier, West Hollywood, Los Angeles (2007–2009)
- Boule Beverly Hills, Beverly Hills (2007–2009)
- Pizzeria Ortica, Costa Mesa, Orange County (2009–2020)
- Comme Ça, Cosmopolitan Hotel, Las Vegas (2010–2015)
- 72 Degrees, GINZA SIX, Ginza, Tokyo
- Salt Water by David Myers, Tokyo
