= Paul Virant =

- Born: February 25, 1970 (age 55)
- Education: Culinary Institute of America
- Spouse: Jennifer Virant
- Children: Lincoln Virant; Zane Virant
- Culinary career
- Cooking style: Contemporary American Cuisine
- Current restaurant(s): Vistro Prime (Hinsdale, Illinois); Gaijin (Chicago, IL); Petite Vie (Western Springs, IL)
- Previous restaurant(s): Vie (Western Springs, Illinois)
- Award(s) won: Michelin stars
- Website: www.paulvirant.com

Paul Virant (born February 25, 1970) is the chef and owner of Vie in Western Springs, Illinois, Vistro Prime in Hinsdale, Illinois, and Gaijin in Chicago, Illinois. His contributions to cooking include introducing inventive canning and preservation recipes to the restaurant industry, which culminated into the release of his cookbook, The Preservation Kitchen: The Craft of Making and Cooking with Pickles, Preserves, and Aigre-doux (co-written with Kate Leahy and photographed by Jeff Kauck).

== Early life ==
Paul Virant's philosophy of year-round, seasonal eating stems from his childhood growing up outside of St. Louis, Missouri, on a farm. Family trips to the farmers markets, gardening, cooking and preserving were a significant part of his family's activities. These experiences helped him develop his reverence for local ingredients, an appreciation towards gastronomy and the time-honored practice of canning and preserving.

== Career ==
After graduating with a degree in nutrition from West Virginia Wesleyan College, he enrolled at the Culinary Institute of America (CIA) in Hyde Park, New York. Following culinary school, he went on to further refine his skills at March in New York City where he worked with chefs Wayne Nish and Hilary Gregg. After two years, chef Virant moved to Chicago where he worked at such restaurants as Charlie Trotter’s, Ambria, Everest and Blackbird.

In 2004, he opened Vie in a suburb of Chicago. With a focus on house-made pickles and preserves, chef Virant's contemporary American cuisine at Vie has garnered regional and national attention, including a three-star review by Phil Vettel of the Chicago Tribune and a Michelin Star. In 2011, he became partner and executive chef of Boka Restaurant Group's Perennial Virant (now closed) and helped open The J. Parker, the rooftop lounge and bar located at Hotel Lincoln in Chicago, the following year. Virant opened Vistro in Hinsdale, Illinois, in 2014. Vistro focuses on approachable, seasonal food and drinks, and serves as a staple in the community for friends and families.

In 2017, Virant launched Jar Sessions, a locally produced, small-batch line of pickled and preserved products. He collaborated with Midwest farmers to create the Jar Sessions collection of farm-to-fork products.

In 2019, Virant opened Gaijin in the West Loop neighborhood of Chicago, which focuses on Japanese okonomiyaki.

Virant is an avid supporter of local, family farms and frequents the Green City Market, Chicago's outdoor farmers market providing local, sustainably grown food with a mission to connect farmers and local producers directly with chefs and the community. He also serves on SAVEUR's chef advisory board as a SAVEUR Tastemaker™.

== Participation in Iron Chef America ==
Paul Virant competed in season seven of Iron Chef America against Iron Chef Masaharu Morimoto. Virant lost to Morimoto with a final score of 51–50. The secret ingredient was pheasant.

== Books ==
The Preservation Kitchen: The Craft of Making and Cooking with Pickles, Preserves, and Aigre-doux by Paul Virant with Kate Leahy. Published by Ten Speed Press, a division of Random House, Inc.

== Awards ==
- Michelin Star
- 2013 Gayot Top 40 Restaurants in the U.S.
- 2013 James Beard Foundation Awards Finalist, Best Chef: Great Lakes
- 2013 James Beard Foundation Awards Semifinalist, Best Chef: Great Lakes
- 2011 James Beard Foundation Awards Nominee, Best Chef: Great Lakes
- 2007 Jean Banchet Award for Culinary Excellence; Top Celebrity Chef
- 2007 Food & Wine Magazine Best New Chefs
- 2006 Jean Banchet Award for Culinary Excellence; Rising Star Chef
- 2005 Chicago Magazine Best New Chef
- 2005 Restaurant Hospitality Rising Star Chef
- 2005 StarChefs.com Rising Star Chef
