= Govind Armstrong =

American chef

- Born: Encino, California, U.S.
- Education: Culinary training under Wolfgang Puck, Mark Peel, and Juan Mari Arzak
- Works: Small Bites, Big Nights: Seductive Little Plates for Intimate Occasions and Lavish Parties
- Culinary career
- Cooking style: California cuisine
- Current restaurants: * Post & Beam (Los Angeles) * The Lobster (Santa Monica Pier) * 8 Oz. Burger Bar (former locations in Los Angeles and Miami; current locations in Seattle and Horseshoe Casinos)
- Television shows: * Top Chef (guest judge) * Iron Chef America (contestant)

Govind Armstrong is an American chef who specializes in California cuisine. He has appeared on the Bravo series Top Chef as a guest judge as well as the Food Network series Iron Chef America as a contestant. He is also the author of the cookbook Small Bites, Big Nights: Seductive Little Plates for Intimate Occasions and Lavish Parties.

== Early life ==
Armstrong grew up Encino, California (in a home originally owned by F. Scott Fitzgerald) with one older brother, an older sister, and two younger sisters. His mother is from Costa Rica, his father was African American, and his grandfather was from India.

== Career ==
Armstrong began his culinary training at the age of 13 at Wolfgang Puck's Spago restaurant in West Hollywood. He also worked under Mark Peel of Campanile in Los Angeles, and Juan Mari Arzak of Arzak in San Sebastián, Spain.

Currently, Armstrong is the chef and co-owner of Post & Beam restaurant in Los Angeles while also serving as Executive Chef for The Lobster on the Santa Monica Pier.

== Restaurants ==
- Post & Beam in Los Angeles
- 8 Oz. Although the Los Angeles and Miami locations are closed, there are 8 Oz. Burger Bars in Seattle, and within Horseshoe Casinos in Mississippi and Louisiana.
