= Mary Dumont =

American chef

- Born: Lowell, Massachusetts, U.S.
- Education: Simmons College
- Spouse: Emily French-Dumont
- Culinary career
- Television show(s): The Today Show; Iron Chef America

Mary Dumont is an American chef based in Boston, Massachusetts.

== Biography ==
Dumont has made appearances on The Today Show and Iron Chef America (competing against Cat Cora) and is the former chef of Harvest in Cambridge, Massachusetts, where she is known for creating innovative dishes.

Before joining the kitchen at Harvest, Dumont was the founder and executive chef of The Dunaway Restaurant at Strawbery Banke in Portsmouth, New Hampshire and was named Best New Chef by Food & Wine magazine in 2006 while there.

In 2017 Dumont opened Cultivar at the Ames Boston Hotel. Cultivar closed in 2019.

In September 2021, Dumont, along with craft beer entrepreneur Pat McAuley, opened PlantPub with locations in Cambridge and Boston, where the motto was “Eat. plants. Drink. Beer.” PlantPub closed in 2023.

As of 2025, Dumont is the executive chef at the White Barn Inn in Kennebunkport, ME.

== Early life ==
Born in Lowell, Massachusetts, she grew up in Hampton Falls, New Hampshire in the historic Governor Weare home. Dumont's training included working in the kitchens of Tracy Des Jardins of Jardinière, Laurent Manrique of Campton Place and Daniel Patterson of Elizabeth Daniel, all in San Francisco.

As of 2025, Dumont is the executive chef at the White Barn Inn in Kennebunkport, Maine.

== Personal life ==
Dumont is openly lesbian, and has 4 step daughters with her wife, Emily French-Dumont. Dumont graduated from Simmons College.
