= Peter X. Kelly =

American restaurateur and chef

- Born: June 3, 1959 (age 67); Yonkers, New York
- Occupations: Restaurateur, chef
- Years active: 1983- present
- Known for: Running Freelance Cafe in Piermont, New York, Restaurant X and Bully Boy Bar in Congers and previously Xaviars X2O on the Hudson in Yonkers

Peter X. Kelly (born June 3, 1959) is a restaurateur and chef. He runs the Xaviars Restaurant Group, which owns and manages Xaviars and Freelance Cafe in Piermont, New York, Restaurant X and Bully Boy Bar in Congers and Xaviars X2O on the Hudson in Yonkers. The name of the group is based on Peter Kelly's middle name, Xavier. He is a self-taught chef, and as of 2015, has spent about 30 years cooking professionally in the Hudson Valley.

== Early life and family ==
He was born and grew up in Yonkers and Croton-on-Hudson, New York, in an Irish Catholic family where he was the tenth of twelve children. He had worked nearly full-time since he was twelve, working to deliver newspapers, shovel snow, stock shelves, or mow lawns.

He studied business at Marist College in Poughkeepsie, and started out in the food industry by washing dishes at a small German restaurant where everything was made in-house. He worked in numerous restaurants in New York including top restaurants such as Laurent in New York City and Plumbush in Cold Spring before going to France to pursue his interest in cuisine. He ate at Michelin three-star restaurants for inspiration.

== Career ==
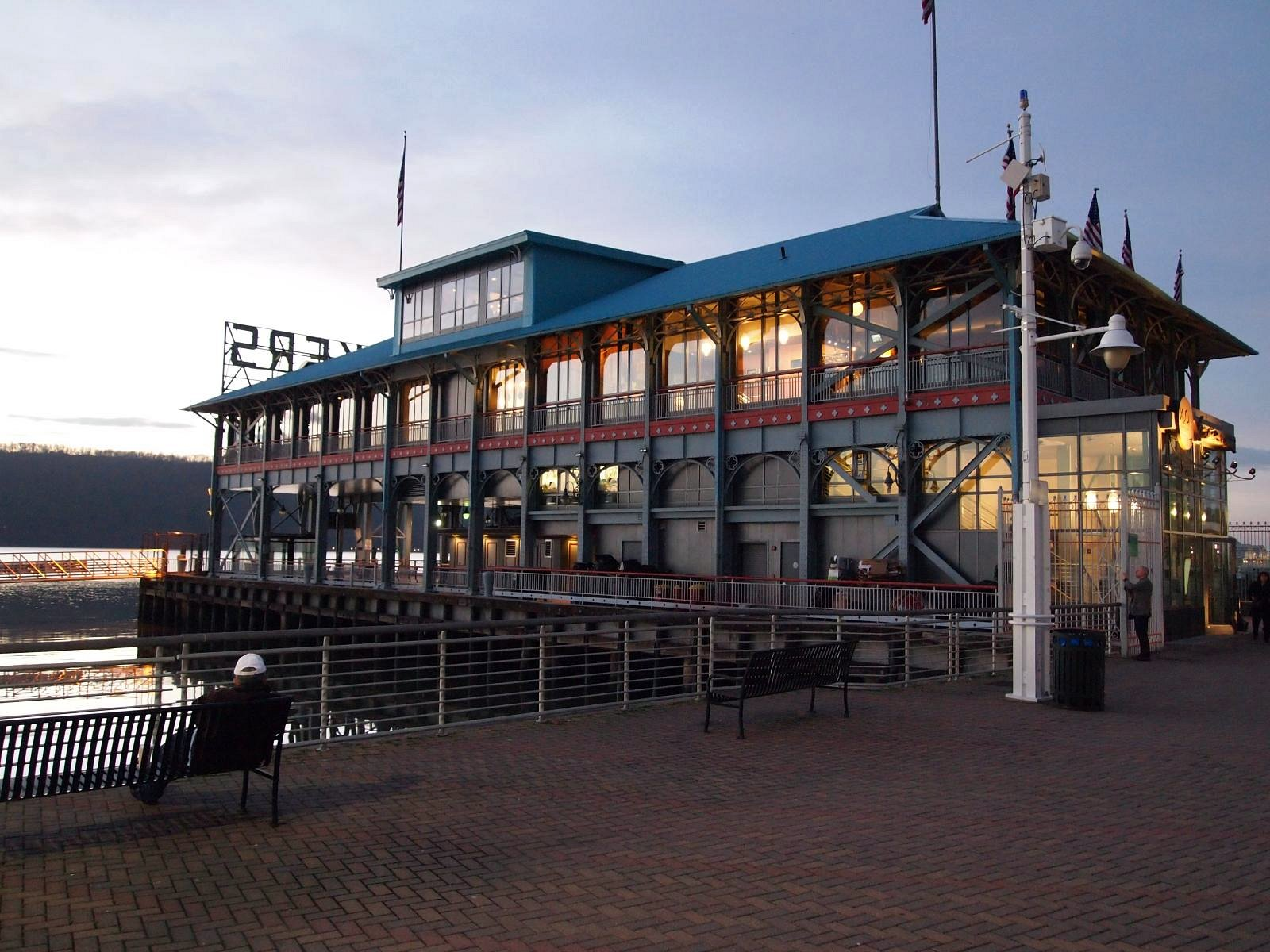
X2O - Xaviars on the Hudson, Kelly's restaurant from 2008-2024.

In 1983, when he was 23 years old, he opened his first restaurant, Xaviars at Garrison, where he served as the head chef; he had no kitchen training or culinary school education. He closed that location in 2002. He has opened other restaurants as his business has grown, including Xaviars in Piermont in 1987 and Freelance Cafe in 1989.

His restaurants have received high praise; Xaviars has received a 29 out of 30 by Zagat. Other ratings and awards include The New York Times's highest rating (Extraordinary), The Mobil Travel Guide Four Star Award, The Dirona Award, Restaurant News Dining Hall of Fame, the Wine Spectator "Best of Award of Excellence", and New York State Restaurateur of The Year 1998. In 2003 Westchester Magazine awarded him the Best Chef award. In 2010 he won a James Beard Award for Best Chef: Northeast for his Xaviars at Piermont. Kelly is in Nation's Restaurant News Fine dining Hall of Fame. He has given a commencement address at the Culinary Institute of America.

Kelly has appeared on television, radio and print media, including an appearance on Iron Chef America (Season 4: (2007) episode 10) where he beat Bobby Flay. He was also a host in Anthony Bourdain's "No Reservations" program's profile of the Hudson Valley with Bill Murray. In the 1990s he became a vintner, his wine is known as "Silenus" (after the tutor of Bacchus in Greek mythology). In 1999, became the founding chef and culinary director for Impromptu Gourmet. He is one of few to receive a New York Times four-star "review outside of Manhattan over the last 40 years. Kelly plans to sell Xaviars and Freelance Cafe, effective late 2016.

In 2008, he opened X20 – Xaviar’s on the Hudson in Yonkers. After years of financial instability, it filed for bankruptcy and was seized by the New York State Tax Department in 2023. The restaurant would later reopen after filing for bankruptcy protection, his second since 2019. Kelly closed X2O - Xaviars on the Hudson on September 29, 2024.

In 2025, he became the chef for two "by PXK" restaurants: Basso by PXK in Chappaqua, New York and The Waveny Tavern by PXK in New Canaan, Connecticut
