= Natasha David =

German bartender (born 1985) known for cocktail recipes

- Born: 1985 (age 40–41); Germany
- Occupations: Bartender; Author
- Known for: Nitecap bar Cocktail recipes

Natasha David is a German-born American bartender, mixologist, and author. In 2014, David opened the critically acclaimed cocktail bar Nitecap on New York's Lower East Side. David has also competed on Iron Chef America. In 2022, David authored the cocktail recipe book Drink Lightly. Her cocktail recipes have been featured in many publications and books, such as New York Times, Bon Appetit, and The Essential Cocktail Book. David has also been awarded as Zagat's 30 under 30, Eater's Bartender of the Year, StarChef's Rising Star, and Imbibe Bartender of the Year. Her consultancy company You & Me Cocktail is responsible for notable projects such as Paul Sevigny's Baby Grand and the revamp of Pravda‘s cocktail program.

== Early career ==
Born in Germany, David moved to New York City at 18 and began bartending. She took on bartending roles at Woodsen & Ford, Danny Meyers’ Maialino, Keith McNally's Pullino's, Maison Premiere, Mayahuel, and Donna before opening Nitecap with Alex Day and David Kaplan.

== Publications featuring her recipes ==
=== Journals ===
- New York Times
- Wine & Spirits Magazine
- Bon Appetit
- Nylon
- Vogue
- PUNCH
- Playboy
- Food & Wine
- Imbibe
- GQ
- Details and Travel & Leisure

=== Books ===
- Sherry: A Modern Guide to the Wine World's Best-Kept Secret, with Cocktails and Recipes by Talia Baiocchi (2014)
- Spritz: Italy's Most Iconic Aperitivo Cocktail, with Recipes by Talia Baiocchi and Leslie Pariseau (2016)
- Amaro: The Spirited World of Bittersweet, Herbal Liqueurs, with Cocktails, Recipes, and Formulas by Brad Thomas Parsons (2016)
- The Essential Cocktail Book: A Complete Guide to Modern Drinks with 150 Recipes by Megan Krigbaum (2017)
- Cocktail Codex: Fundamentals, Formulas, Evolutions by Alex Day, Nick Fauchald, and David Kaplan (2018)
- Session Cocktails: Low-Alcohol Drinks for Any Occasion by Drew Lazor (2018)
- Nightcap: More than 40 Cocktails to Close Out Any Evening by Kara Newman (2018)
- Last Call: Bartenders on Their Final Drink and the Wisdom and Rituals of Closing Time by Brad Thomas Parsons (2019)
- The Japanese Art Of The Cocktail by Masahiro Urushido (2021)
- Mezcal and Tequila Cocktails: Mixed Drinks for the Golden Age of Agave by Robert Simonson (2021)
- Drink Lightly by Natasha David (2022)

== Awards and recognitions ==
- Zagat’s 2014 30 Under 30
- Eaters 2014 New York Bartender of the Year
- Eaters 2014 National Bartender of the Year
- 2015 Star Chefs Rising Star
- Imbibe Magazine’s 2020 Bartender of the Year
