= Kevin Rathbun =

American chef

Chef Kevin Rathbun
- Born: Kansas City, Missouri
- Culinary career
- Current restaurant(s): Kevin Rathbun Steak, Rathbun's, KR Steakbar, Krog Bar
- Previous restaurant(s): NAVA, Bluepointe
- Television show: Iron Chef America
- Award won: James Beard
- Website: www.kevinrathbun.com

Kevin Rathbun is an American chef active in Atlanta though originally from Kansas City, Missouri.

== Restaurants ==
His signature restaurant, Rathbun's is housed in a 19th-century warehouse space, Stoveworks, formerly a potbelly stove factory near the Old Fourth Ward in Atlanta. Other Rathbun restaurants include Kevin Rathbun Steak a few blocks from Rathbun's with a patio on the BeltLine, Krog Bar (Mediterranean tapas bar) also in Stoveworks, and KR Steakbar opened in 2012 in Peachtree Hills area of Buckhead.

== Notoriety and awards ==
Rathbun's was noted as one of Travel and Leisure's best new American restaurants of 2004.

His three Atlanta restaurants were noted in The New York Times.

Other awards include:

- “Best New Restaurant 2004”, Esquire Magazine
- “Best New Restaurant” and "Restaurant of the Year", Atlanta magazine
- “Best New Restaurant” by Creative Loafing
- USA TODAY, “New Gourmet Selection of Restaurants”
- Bon Appetit Magazine: “Where to Eat Now”
- Every Day with Rachael Ray: 2009 top eight U.S. steakhouses

== Biography ==
Rathbun is from Kansas City and attended Johnson County Community College. He began working in restaurants as a dishwasher at Sambo's. Over his lifetime, Rathbun worked with well-known chefs such as Bradley Ogden, Emeril Lagasse, and Stephen Pyles. He was nominated for the James Beard “Rising Star Chef” of 1994. He brought Southwestern cuisine to Atlanta with the restaurant NAVA. Later he introduced fusion cuisine to the city in his position as the opening Executive Chef of Bluepointe. From 1999 until 2003, Rathbun was the Corporate Executive Chef for Buckhead Life Restaurant Group, overseeing a number of the group's restaurants.

In February 2008 he and his brother, fellow chef Kent Rathbun, appeared as contestants on Iron Chef America.
