= Eduard Frauneder =

Austrian chef and restaurateur

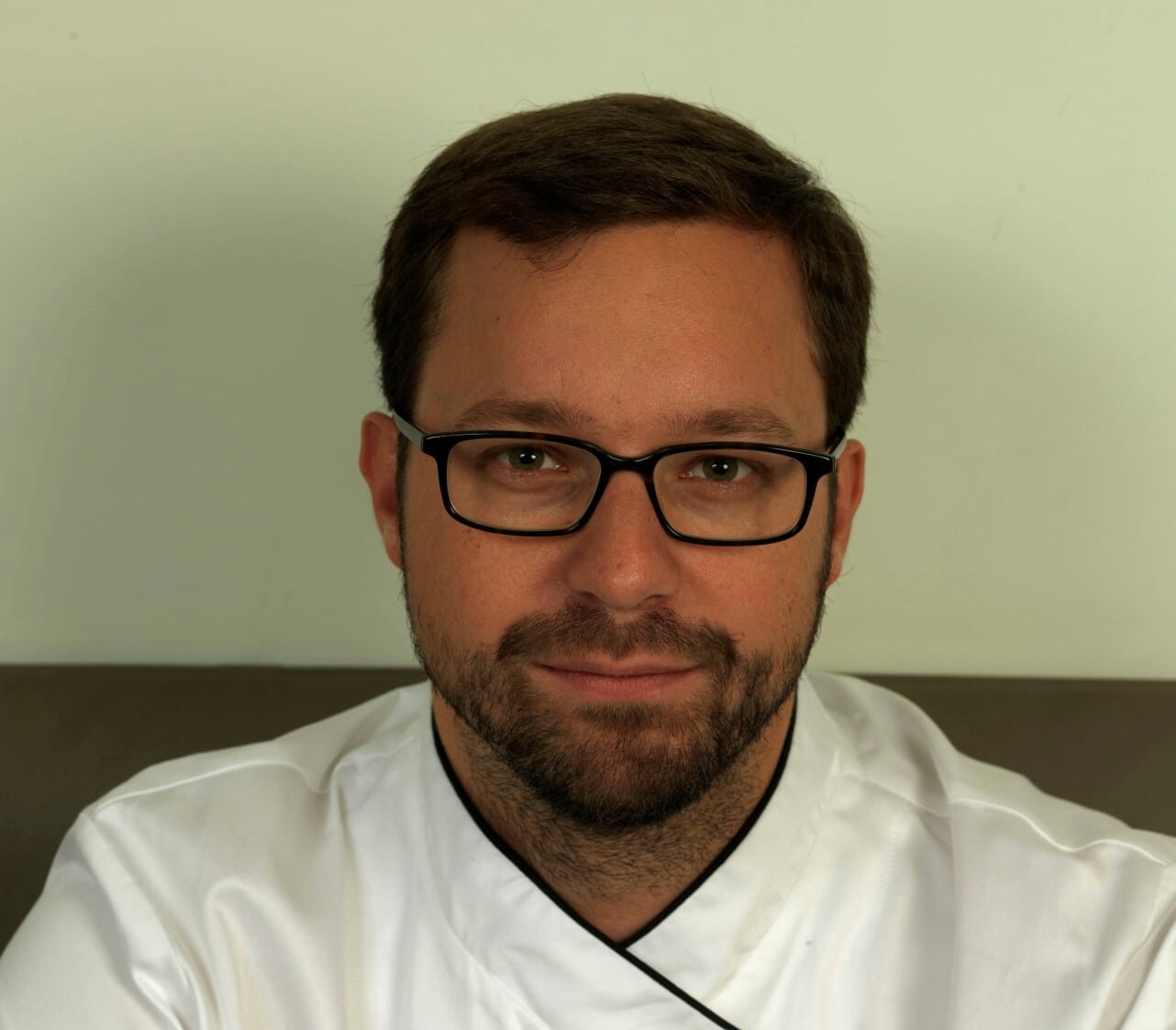
Eduard Frauneder in 2013

Eduard (Edi) Peter Frauneder (born 1977) is an Austrian chef known for his promotion of Austrian cuisine in New York City, where he started multiple restaurants. He earned his first Michelin Star in 2010 and became "one of the world's youngest Michelin Starred chefs".

== Early life ==
Eduard (Edi) Frauneder was born in Vienna, Austria in 1977 to Maria and Eduard Frauneder. He grew up in the bakery/pastry shop of his parents where he worked with his father. The elder Frauneder was the second generation owner of Backerei Frauneder in Vienna. Frauneder trained as a baker and pastry chef in the family business before attending culinary school in Vienna at Gastgewerbefachschule Wien am Judenplatz.

== Career ==
At the age of 19 Frauneder moved to London where he worked as the personal chef to the Austrian Ambassador. In 2001, he moved to New York where he became the personal chef to the German Ambassador to the United Nations. He opened four restaurants in New York City (Seasonal, Edi and The Wolf, Bar Freud, Schilling) and bar The Third Man.

== Personal life ==
In 2017 Frauneder married Dr. Tracy-Ann Moo, a breast surgical oncologist. They have 2 children Eduard and Vienna. Frauneder is an avid Kite surfer.

== Awards and honors ==
Awards

- 2018 - Goldene Cloche, Austrian trade commission for his promotion of Austria cuisine abroad.

Media honors

- 2010 - Michelin Star for the restaurant Seasonal
- 2012 - Winner, Iron Chef America
- 2014 - Winner, Knife Fight, third season

== Television credits ==
Show Name/Network	Year	Role	Citation
Iron Chef America/Food Network	10/07/12	Himself, chef	
Fox Business	10/02/12	Himself, guest	
Lebe Deinen Traum	03/13/13	Himself, guest	
CBS The Dish	02/13/13	Himself, guest	
Knife Fight Season 2/Esquire Network	10/07/14	Himself, chef	
Chopped/ Food Network	10/15/15	Guest Judge	
Knife Fight Season 3/Esquire Network	02/06/15	Himself, chef	
Knife Fight Season 4/Esquire Network	12/29/15	Guest Judge	
USA Today	12/06/16	Himself, guest	
AZ Central	12/14/16	Himself, guest	
The Food Seen	09/25/18	Himself, guest	
