= Kent Rathbun =

American chef and restaurateur

Chef Kent Rathbun
- Born: April 17, 1961 (age 64); Kansas City, Missouri
- Culinary career
- Current restaurant(s): Abacus, Jasper's
- Previous restaurant(s): The Mansion on Turtle Creek

Kent Rathbun (born William Kent Rathbun on April 17, 1961, in Kansas City, Missouri) is a four-time Beard Award-nominated American chef and restaurateur. His restaurants included Abacus, in Dallas, Texas, an upscale restaurant chosen as most popular in Dallas by the 2007 edition of the Zagat Survey; Jasper's, in the Texas cities of Dallas, Plano(closed), Richardson, The Woodlands, and Austin(closed); and Hickory (closed), his upscale burger and bbq concept in Plano. He also catered in Dallas/Ft Worth, Houston and Austin with his entity Kent Rathbun Catering.

In February 2008 he and his brother, fellow chef Kevin Rathbun, appeared as contestants on Iron Chef America. They beat Bobby Flay on the "elk" episode. The scene where Chef Kent carries the elk appeared on Iron Chef's Greatest Moments.

== Career ==
Rathbun entered the food industry at age 14, washing dishes at a local Sambo's, a job for which he had lied about his age, claiming to be one year older. By the end of his first day as a dishwasher, he had asked to help the night cook, who within three weeks recommended that Rathbun be promoted to the cooking station. At age 17, he was working as an apprentice in the 5-star dining room of Kansas City's La Bonne Auberge restaurant, where his mother worked as a maitre d'. The fine dining experience changed his culinary tastes, causing him to come home determined to educate the experienced cooks in his household: "When I started learning how to work with fresh vegetables and snails and foie gras, that's when my taste just exploded. I told my mother, `I can't believe it. All those things you and Grandma have been cooking all these years - you've been overcookin' 'em.'"

After running a catering service for the Dallas Museum of Art and serving as sous chef in Dallas' The Mansion on Turtle Creek, Rathbun decided in 1999 to open his own restaurant Abacus. Shortly thereafter, in 2003 he opened Jasper's in Plano. Both establishments were opened as smoke-free restaurants prior to Dallas' enacting a ban on public smoking, and Rathbun has been active in efforts to ban smoking in restaurants statewide. Zagat rated Abacus highly in 2008 as well as in 2007, granting the restaurant a rating of 28 points (on a scale of 30) for its food and 27 for its decor and service — a rating range that the guide describes as denoting "extraordinary to perfection" — and quoting survey respondents who called Rathbun a "genius." Abacus has been awarded the Forbes Four-Star and the AAA Four Diamonds for over 14 years. Jasper's was awarded NRN Hot Concept Award and was named as having some of the top ribs in America by Bon Appetit.

== Personal life ==
Rathbun is currently married to fellow restaurateur Tracy Rathbun, co-owner of Dallas' Lovers Seafood and Shinsei restaurant with Lynne Fearing. The close ties among the four restaurateurs were highlighted in media coverage when chefs Tre Wilcox of Abacus and Casey Thompson of Shinsei were selected as contestants in the third season of the reality television program Top Chef.
