= Chris Hastings (chef) =

American chef

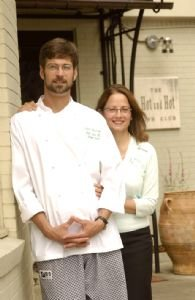

Chris Hastings is the owner and executive chef of Hot & Hot Fish Club, a restaurant in Birmingham, Alabama, and was twice a finalist for the James Beard Award "Best Chef in the South" award. In 2012, Chef Hastings was the winner of this award.

In 2010 he started a side business, based on his experience making woodcock feather pins as gifts, and began producing these and other custom pins in his garage "out of materials gleaned during his hunts in Nova Scotia."

== Childhood ==
Chris Hastings grew up in Charlotte, North Carolina. He spent family vacations in South Carolina where he gathered or caught oysters, clams, shrimp, flounder, crab, and spot tail bass for his family to cook. He has two brothers, David and Steven, and one sister Angelica.

== Education ==
Hastings graduated from the culinary arts program at Johnson & Wales University in Providence, Rhode Island.

== Career ==
Hastings moved to Atlanta in 1984 where he worked as a sous chef at the Ritz Carlton. In 1989, he and his wife moved to San Francisco and helped open the Lark Creek Inn where Hastings served as sous chef.

Hastings and his wife Idie opened Hot & Hot Fish Club, named for the Murrells Inlet, South Carolina epicurean club of which his great-great-great-great-grandfather was a member. In the restaurant's early days, while Hastings focused on the dinner menu, Idie used her pastry experience to develop the dessert menu. Although the menus change daily, highlighting the best seasonal products available, several signature items remain: the Hot and Hot Shrimp and Grits made with Country Ham, Fresh Thyme, Tomatoes and Ver Jus is always a favorite among the locals and Elton's Chocolate Soufflé with Fresh Cream continues to be a favorite ending to many meals at the restaurant.

Hastings also teamed up with Russell Lands On Lake Martin and executive chef, Rob McDaniel, as the culinary advisor of the SpringHouse Restaurant located in the Lake Martin development Russell Crossroads in Alexander City, Alabama.

Hastings opened The Side by Side restaurant in the Embassy Suites in Tuscaloosa, AL in 2015.

Hastings opened his second Birmingham restaurant, Ovenbird, in The Pepper Place development. The food is inspired by open fire cooking from the regions of Spain, Uruguay, Argentina, Portugal, and the American South.

Chef Hastings competed and won against Bobby Flay in Iron Chef America which aired on Food Network on February 26, 2012. The secret ingredient was sausage.

== Pins ==
Hastings' lapel and hat pins have been described as "rugged designs" that "bring casual elegance to a tweed lapel or the brim of a hat."

Garden & Gun magazine honored Hastings as a "Best of Made in the South" style runner up for his hat and lapel pins.

== Awards ==
- 2012 James Beard "Best Chef in the South" Winner
- Two Time James Beard "Best Chef in the South" Finalist
- "Bright-flavored seafood still stars," Gourmet Magazine Jane and Michael Stern
- Four Stars and "personal favorite" Birmingham News Susan Swagler
- Robert Mondavi Culinary Award for Excellence
- 2000 and 2001 "Best Chef in Birmingham" Birmingham Magazine.
- 1985 Atlanta Culinary Show, gold medal.
- Featured in publications such as The New York Times, The Wall Street Journal, Bon Appetit, Gourmet, Food Arts, Nation's Restaurant News, Santé Magazine, Coastal Living, Metropolitan Home, Executive Traveler, Cooking Light Magazine and Delta's Sky magazine as well as “Good Day Atlanta,” “Good Day Alabama,” the Food Network's “Best Of”, Top 5 and NBC's “Roker on the Road.”

== Publications ==
- Author of Hot and Hot Fish Club Cookbook
