= Roberto Donna =

Italian chef

- Born: 1961 (age 63–64); Turin, Italy
- Culinary career
- Current restaurant(s): Alba Osteria, Al Dente
- Previous restaurant(s): Galileo
- Award(s) won: 1996 James Beard Foundation Award, Best Chef: Mid-Atlantic

Roberto Donna is an Italian chef and restaurateur in Washington D.C.

Donna was born in Turin, Italy, where he enrolled in culinary school at the age of 13. He came to the United States at the age of 19, working in an Italian restaurant on K Street in Washington, D.C.

In 1984, Donna opened Galileo in Dupont Circle, which was an immediate success. The restaurant only seated 50, and in the early days, even Vice-President George H. W. Bush could not secure a last-minute reservation. Donna and his partner Savino Recine opened more casual trattorias, Primi Piatti, and then I Matti, serving pizza and pasta. By the end of the 1990s, Donna's empire grew to 12 restaurants, including Il Radicchio, Pesce, and Barolo. In 1999, he expanded Galileo into a neighboring space and opened a restaurant-within-a-restaurant, Il Laboratorio del Galileo, serving multi-course meals in a small (25-30 seats) dining room, with a glass-walled "showcase" kitchen.

Donna published a cookbook, Cooking in Piedmont, in 1996.

Donna won the 1996 James Beard Foundation Award for Best Chef: Mid-Atlantic. The next year, Galileo was named one of the "10 Best Italian Restaurants in America" by Wine Spectator. The Restaurant Association of Metropolitan Washington recognized Donna as the "Chef of the Year" in 1990, and the "Restaurateur of the Year" in 1995. Donna was invited to Rome in 1996 to receive the Insegna del Ristorante Italiano, awarded by the Italian Government in recognition of serving the best authentic Italian food outside Italy.

In 2005, Donna competed on Iron Chef America, losing to Masaharu Morimoto after failing to plate a sufficient number of dishes. He requested a rematch and bested Morimoto in 2006.

In 2004, Donna's company declared bankruptcy and his restaurants began to close; Galileo closed in 2006, and he had no restaurants to his name when Bebo Trattoria closed in 2009. Donna was prosecuted for failing to pay taxes at Bebo, and in 2010, Donna pled guilty to felony embezzlement, receiving a five-year suspended sentence on condition of probation, good behavior, and restitution. Donna and his business partners still faced several civil lawsuits when he returned to the kitchen with the opening of Galileo III in October 2010. The restaurant closed abruptly after less than one year.

In 2012, Donna opened Al Dente in Embassy Row, and Esquire magazine named him its "Chef of the Year." In February 2013, a four-seat counter, Roberto's 4, opened within Al Dente. At the end of 2013, Donna opened a second restaurant, Alba Osteria, in Mount Vernon Triangle. Alba Osteria closed in 2019, citing rent disagreements with its landlord.

In February, 2022, Roberto’s opened in Vienna, Virginia, with Donna as chef, doing what he does best. The restaurant is solely owned by Donna’s wife, Nancy Sabbagh.
