= Iron Chef America =

American cooking competition television series

- Also known as: Iron Chef America: The Series
- Genre: Reality television; Cooking show
- Presented by: Alton Brown; Kevin Brauch; Mark Dacascos; Jet Tila
- Starring: Mario Batali; Bobby Flay; Wolfgang Puck; Masaharu Morimoto; Cat Cora; Michael Symon; Jose Garces; Marc Forgione; Geoffrey Zakarian; Alex Guarnaschelli; Stephanie Izard
- Composer: Craig Marks
- Country of origin: United States
- Original language: English
- No. of seasons: 13
- No. of episodes: 205 (list of episodes)

Production
- Executive producer: Stu Schreiberg
- Producers: John Bravakis; Steve Kroopnick
- Production locations: Los Angeles, California; New York City
- Editor: Morgen Kassel
- Camera setup: Multi-camera
- Running time: 46 minutes

Original release
- Network: Food Network
- Release: March 6, 2005 – July 22, 2018

Related
- Iron Chef; Iron Chef UK; Iron Chef Canada; The Next Iron Chef; Iron Chef Gauntlet; Iron Chef Showdown; Iron Chef: Quest for an Iron Legend

Iron Chef America is an American cooking show based on Fuji Television's Iron Chef, and is the second American adaptation of the series, following the failed Iron Chef USA that aired in 2001. The show is produced by Food Network, which also carried a dubbed version of the original Iron Chef. Like the original Japanese program, the program is a culinary game show. In each episode, a new challenger chef competes against one of the resident "Iron Chefs" in a one-hour cooking competition based on a secret ingredient or ingredients, and sometimes theme.

The Chairman is played by actor and martial artist Mark Dacascos. The commentary is provided solely by Alton Brown and Kevin Brauch is the floor reporter. The music is written by composer Craig Marks, who released the soundtrack titled "Iron Chef America & The Next Iron Chef" by the end of 2010. In addition, regular ICA judge and Chopped host Ted Allen provided additional floor commentary for two special battles: Battle First Thanksgiving (Symon/Flay v. Cora/Morimoto) and Battle White House Produce (Batali/Lagasse v. Flay/Comerford).

The show is a sequel to the original Iron Chef storyline. The introduction of the Battle of the Masters miniseries establishes the story: Chairman Kaga (played in the Japanese show by Takeshi Kaga) has decided to open an American Kitchen Stadium, assigning his nephew to take the position of the Chairman. The series was initially in Los Angeles, where the Battle of the Masters took place; later, the permanent Kitchen Stadium was established in New York's Chelsea Market. For the Battle of the Masters, the elder Chairman dispatched two Iron Chefs: Hiroyuki Sakai and Masaharu Morimoto.

(This backstory contradicts story elements from the 2002 Iron Chef Japan Cup Special, in which Chairman Kaga had died from mis-prepared fugu.)

In Season 11, the show's fiction expanded to include international Iron Chefs, spread by the Chairman "like Johnny Appleseed". In the first episode of that season, Iron Chef UK chef Judy Joo competed on the US show against Iron Chef Guarnaschelli as an Iron Chef.

Unlike the original Iron Chef or Iron Chef USA, Alton Brown, rather than the chairman, is credited as the show's host.

In 2017, Iron Chef Showdown premiered as the spiritual successor to Iron Chef America, with a revised format and returning Iron Chefs Bobby Flay, Jose Garces, Alex Guarnaschelli, and Michael Symon joined by Iron Chef Gauntlet winner Stephanie Izard. On April 5, 2018, Food Network announced Iron Chef America returning under its original name, with Jet Tila serving as floor reporter.

== The Iron Chefs ==
On this version of Iron Chef, the Iron Chefs have either been previous Food Network personalities, are current personalities, were part of the original Iron Chef, or earned their position on The Next Iron Chef.

The winning percentage for Iron Chefs participating on Iron Chef America is an average. The win/loss data is based solely on the performance of the participant as an Iron Chef in Iron Chef America: The Series and the Battle of the Masters but does not include the results from Iron Chef Showdown.

Iron Chef	Seasons	Specialty	Win	Loss	Draw	Total	Win %
Mario Batali	BOM, 1–6	Italian	19	5	0	24	79.2%
Cat Cora	1–10	Greek/Mediterranean	21	12	1	34	63.2%
Bobby Flay	BOM, 1–12	Southwestern	43	16	2	61	72.1%
Marc Forgione	9–13	Modern American	8	7	0	15	53.0%
Jose Garces	8–13	Latin Fusion	16	7	0	23	69.6%
Alex Guarnaschelli	11–13	Modern American	7	4	0	11	63.6%
Stephanie Izard	13	Modern American	2	0	0	2	100.0%
Masaharu Morimoto	BOM, 1–13	Japanese	26	17	1	44	60.2%
Wolfgang Puck	BOM	California cuisine	1	0	0	1	100.0%
Michael Symon	5–13	Mediterranean	34	7	1	42	82.1%
Geoffrey Zakarian	10–13	Modern American	9	5	0	14	64.3%

^101 Based on weighted average (.5 victory for a draw). The win/loss data is based on the performance of the Iron Chef in Iron Chef America: The Series and the Battle of the Masters (BOM).
^102 Flay retired as Iron Chef at the end of Iron Chef Showdown.
^103 Forgione's record does not include his victory over Marco Canora in the finale of The Next Iron Chef as Forgione did not hold the title Iron Chef during that battle.
^104 Garces' record does not include his defeat of Flay in Battle Melon, or his victory over Jehangir Mehta in the finale of The Next Iron Chef as Garces did not hold the title Iron Chef during either battle.
^105 Guarnaschelli's record does not include her loss to Cora in Battle Farmer's Market, or her victory over Amanda Freitag in the finale of The Next Iron Chef as Guarnaschelli did not hold the title Iron Chef during either battle.
^106 Morimoto's record includes his battle as a competitor in the Battle of the Masters. It does not include his 16–7–1 record in the original Iron Chef during his tenure as the third Iron Chef Japanese.
^107 Symon's record does not include his loss to Morimoto in Battle Asparagus, or his victory over John Besh in the finale of The Next Iron Chef as Symon did not hold the title Iron Chef during either battle.
^108 Zakarian's record does not include his loss to Morimoto in Battle Sardines, or his victory over Elizabeth Falkner in the finale of The Next Iron Chef as Zakarian did not hold the title Iron Chef during either battle.
^109 Izard's record does not include her victories in Iron Chef Gauntlet as Izard did not hold the title Iron Chef at that time, nor her 2–0 record on Iron Chef Showdown.

=== Jackets ===
Each Iron Chef wears a specially designed chef's jacket, a simplified version of the more stylized attire worn by the Japanese Iron Chefs, along with an apron and trousers of their choice for each battle. Through the Battle of the Masters and the show's first six seasons, the Iron Chefs wore contemporary denim chef's jackets with individualized solid-colored patches and trim: Batali's jacket trim was red, Cora's pink, Flay's blue, Morimoto's white, Puck's green and Symon's black. On the left shoulder of each jacket was a flag representing the Chef's country of origin.

During the show's sixth season, designer and Iron Chef America judge Marc Ecko designed new jackets for the Iron Chefs, which were first worn on the 2008 "Thanksgiving Showdown" episode. The jackets are individualized for each chef and include features such as short sleeves for Symon's jacket that make it resemble the black shirts he wears at his restaurant, Lola, or men's kimono styling and colors for Morimoto's jacket that suggest the costume he wore on the original Iron Chef. With the exception of Symon and Garces (whose long sleeves were shortened for his second season on ICA), the jackets have long, turn-back sleeves. Colors differ by chef: charcoal grey (Flay), black (Symon), light blue (Cora), silver with a red undershirt (Morimoto), white with light brown trim (Batali), white with green trim (Lagasse, for Battle White House produce), brown with wide red edging (Garces), black with red trim, later grey with white trim (Forgione), white with dark red trim, later grey with black trim (Zakarian), black with white trim, later dark maroon (Guarnaschelli), and black with grey collar (Izard). "Iron Chef" with the chef's last name underneath is embroidered in the font from the show's logo on the left front side of the jacket, in the manner of a traditional chef's coat. The jackets also include a large embroidered Iron Chef patch on the right arm also bearing the chef's name, and an American flag on the left sleeve.

== History ==
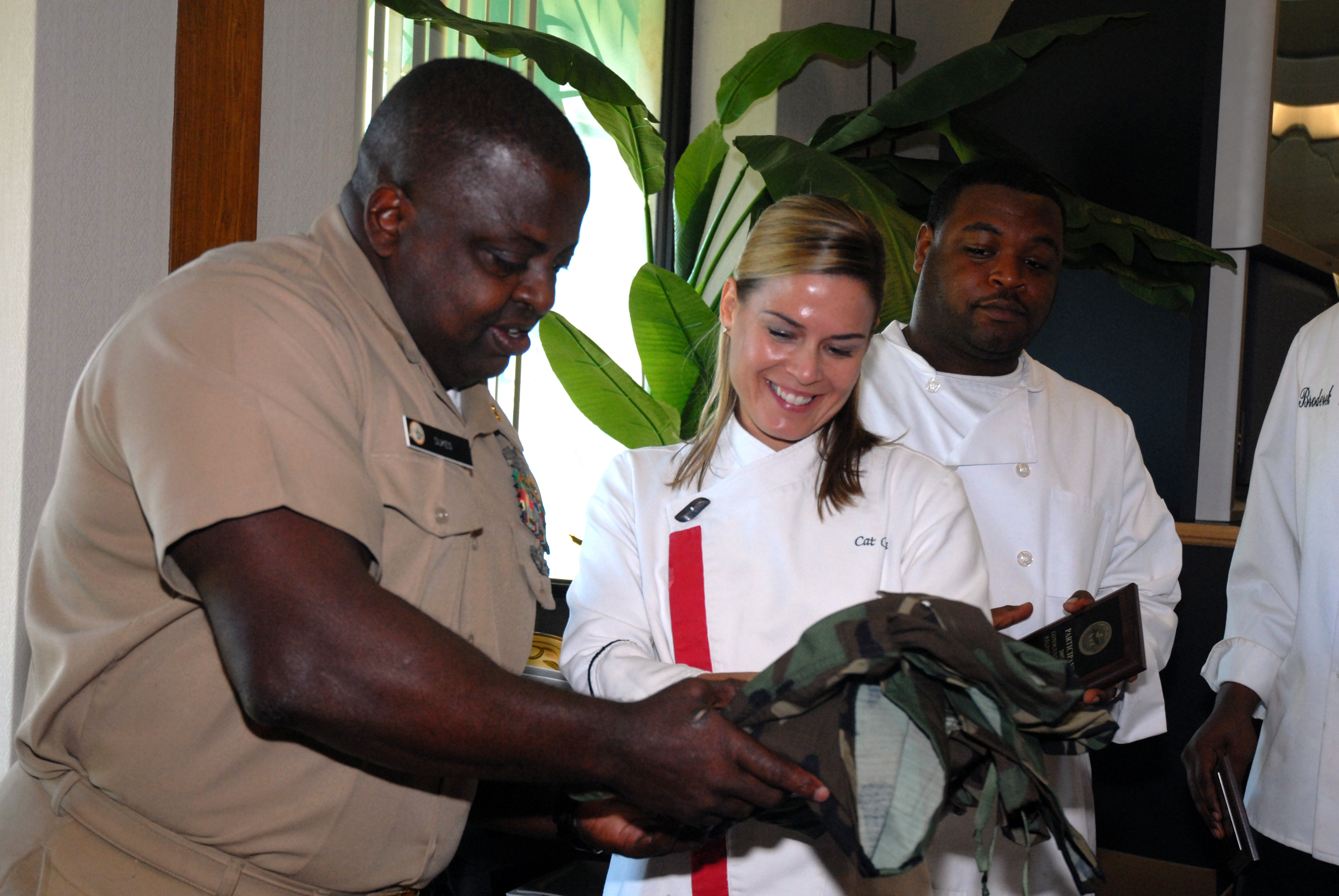
Team members assigned to Naval Mobile Construction Battalion, Gulfport, Miss., give a BDU with her name it to Chef Cat Cora

Iron Chef America first aired as a special titled Iron Chef America: Battle of the Masters. Unlike Iron Chef USA, Iron Chef America quickly earned legitimacy with the appearance of Iron Chefs Hiroyuki Sakai and Masaharu Morimoto. (Chen Kenichi was also originally slated to appear, but he was absent due to a scheduling conflict.) The first Battle of the Masters involved Sakai and Flay, with the theme of trout. There, Sakai had made two dishes of note: one was gift-wrapped to commemorate the opening of Kitchen Stadium America, while the other was trout ice cream, a dish that would be repeatedly recalled and referred to later on when anyone used the ice cream maker. Other battles in Battle of the Masters were Morimoto taking on Batali, Morimoto taking on Wolfgang Puck in Puck’s only battle, and a tag team battle where Morimoto and Flay teamed up against Sakai and Batali. Battle of the Masters was largely successful and a regular series was commissioned.

The regular series is taped in New York, while Battle of the Masters took place in Los Angeles at Los Angeles Center Studios. Because of his other interests, Puck was forced to decline to appear in the regular series, and Morimoto took his place. Later that season, in the final episode of the listed order, Cat Cora debuted as an Iron Chef during "Battle Potato", becoming the first female chef to hold that rank.

The second season of Iron Chef America began airing in July 2005. This season saw its first and second ties on the American show: the first aired on July 31, 2005, with both challenger and Iron Chef receiving 45 points. In this case, unlike Iron Chef, there is no overtime, although a rematch was suggested by Alton Brown. The third such tied result occurred in Season Three, when Susur Lee challenged Bobby Flay in Battle Bacon.

Starting November 2006, Australia's SBS, the domestic rights holder to the original Iron Chef program, started airing Iron Chef America: The Battle Of The Masters, replacing the original Japanese incarnation of the program. On December 9, Season 1 of Iron Chef America began airing. The show was scheduled to run until February 17, 2007, but due to viewer feedback, SBS ended broadcast of Iron Chef America three weeks early and resumed showing the original Iron Chef on February 3, 2007.

Starting in Season 8, Mario Batali was dropped from the show's opening sequence, though he continued to appear in on-air promos for the show. Despite his appearance during the special battle in which he was teamed up with Emeril Lagasse against Flay and White House Chef Cristeta Comerford, for a time it was not clear if he would return to compete in Iron Chef America on a regular basis. In a July 2010 interview with Slashfood's Allen Salkin, Batali explained that his absence from the series was due to travel conflicts with the show's summer shooting schedule and expressed a desire to appear in 2 to 3 battles for Season 9. However, in a May 2012 interview with The Atlantic, Batali later explained that he resented the decision to move away from serious food critics to "skinny little actresses" and other personalities he felt weren't credible enough to judge his cuisine.

After the 2014 season, the show was put on temporary hiatus, but on July 25, 2017, Alton Brown tweeted and Food Network announced that Iron Chef America would be returning in last quarter of 2017 as "Iron Chef Showdown".

== Format ==
After the active Iron Chefs are introduced by Alton Brown, the challenger chef is introduced. The Iron Chef introduction sequence is sometimes skipped in the holiday shows and other specials. In the first two seasons, the chairman announced the challenger's Iron Chef opponent. Starting with Season 3, the show returned to the format of its predecessor, where the challenger chef selects the Iron Chef they will battle. In reality, the match-ups are determined well in advance in all three incarnations of the show, which is not to say that the challengers have no influence on the selection of their opponent.

An ingredient or group of ingredients (referred to as the "secret ingredient(s)") is revealed, and the cooking begins. On occasion, the ingredients are actually a 'theme meal;' for example, eggs, bacon, potatoes, etc. are revealed and thus the "secret ingredient" is breakfast. Just as with the original Iron Chef, the "secret" ingredient is not truly secret. Both the competitor and the Iron Chef are given a list of three to five ingredients before the battle, of which one will be the secret ingredient.

Unlike Iron Chef, where chefs had roughly 5 minutes to discuss their strategy before the battle begins, the revelation of the theme ingredient occurs 45 minutes before the start of the battle. However, this segment is not shown on television, and it is a common assumption that the battle starts immediately after the secret ingredient is revealed. This practice was described on an episode of Unwrapped.

The chairman announces the start of each battle with:

"So now America, with an open heart and empty stomach, I say unto you in the words of my uncle: 'Allez cuisine!'"

"There's the Chairman's familiar "Allez Cuisine!" the French phrase that calls the Iron Chefs to culinary battle."

— Alton Brown (Flay v. Tsai)

"Allez cuisine!" (loosely translated as "Go cook!" or "Start cooking!") is the phrase that started battles in the original Japanese series (hence the reference to his uncle, Chairman Kaga).

On Iron Chef America, both the challenger and the Iron Chef have 60 minutes to prepare a minimum of five dishes based on a theme ingredient. Starting with Season 11 (2012–13), the first course is due to the judges 20 minutes after the start. After that point, a "culinary curveball" is announced by the chairman. It can be an ingredient, piece of equipment, or plating device. Each chef is required to integrate the item into at least one of their remaining dishes, and receives scoring from the judges based on their use.

After the first commercial break, Brown typically asks Kevin Brauch to introduce the judges. Unlike the original series, none of the judges participate in the running commentary, although Brown or Brauch visit with them roughly mid-battle for their comments on the ongoing action and the secret ingredient. Over the course of the cooking hour, Brown may also provide further information on the theme ingredient, using visual aids as required.

The dishes are tasted by the chairman and a panel of three judges, two of whom are professional food critics (a contrast to the original Iron Chef, which typically had one professional food critic as a judge). Like the original Iron Chef, each chef can be awarded up to 20 points by each judge, consisting of ten points for taste, five for plating (the appearance or presentation of the dishes), and five for originality. The rules are explained by Brauch before the judging. The chef with the higher score is declared the winner. If there is a tie, it remains as the final result, unlike Iron Chef, where an overtime battle was immediately called with a new theme ingredient; however, if the overtime battle also resulted in a tie, that would be the final result. (Also in contrast with the original, the final scores are subdivided by category, rather than by individual judge.) Starting with Season 11 (2012–2013), an additional ten points per judge is also available: up to five points for the first dish presentation, and up to five points for the use of the "culinary curveball". The scoring for the first dish is revealed shortly after the dishes are presented to and tasted by the judges, and the total score (including the "culinary curveball" points) is reserved for the judgment and revelation of the winner.

Iron Chef America is not affiliated with any culinary institution, unlike Iron Chef, which was associated with Hattori Nutrition College. Chefs also bring in their own sous-chefs. Like Iron Chef, each chef is allowed two sous-chefs. In tag-team or two-on-one battles, both chefs on one side each bring one sous-chef. On the original Iron Chef, early episodes had two chefs without sous-chefs, while later episodes had two chefs and one sous-chef per side. The sous-chefs employed by the Iron Chefs are as follows:

- Batali – Anne Burrell and Mark Ladner
- Cora – Lorilynn Bauer, David Schimmel, Ed Cotton, Richard Blais (other sous-chefs have been employed on occasion)
- Flay – Flay employs a rotating staff of sous-chefs from his restaurants
- Morimoto – Ariki Omae, Makoto Okuwa, and Jamison Blankenship (other sous-chefs have been employed on occasion)
- Symon – Cory Barrett and Derek Clayton
- Garces – Dave Conn, MacGregor Mann, Jessica Mogardo
- Forgione – rotating staff of sous-chefs from Forgione's restaurants
- Zakarian – Paul Corsentino, Eric Haugen, Alex Guarnaschelli (before her promotion to Iron Chef)
- Guarnaschelli – Ashley Merriman and Wirt Cook

All of the sous-chefs for both the Iron Chef and challenger are informally introduced at some point in the contest, unlike the original Iron Chef. Sous-chefs have occasionally entered into battle against Iron Chefs, including the Iron Chef under whom they worked.

The rules in Iron Chef America are thought to favor the Iron Chef less than the original program; however, some challengers have noted favoritism in the selection of theme ingredients. On Iron Chef, the Iron Chef's food was always tasted second, while on Iron Chef America, the chef whose food is tasted first is determined by a coin toss before the show (Flay allowed his competitor to pick).

Since the tasting and judgment take upwards of 45 minutes to complete (although it is edited down in post-production), the chef serving second is allowed to reheat his or her dishes, as was allowed on Iron Chef.

Several of the secrets to how the show is taped were revealed in an episode of Unwrapped entitled "Food Network Unwrapped 2." It was stated that the chefs find out what the secret ingredient is about 15 minutes before the battle begins because the opening sequence is recorded many times. It is only the final taping of this sequence where the words "Allez cuisine!" are said and the battle begins. Moreover, at the end of the one-hour battle, the chefs must still prepare four plates of each of their five dishes for the judges and the chairman. This is done during a 45-minute period after the battle ends and before tasting begins. They consider this to be part of the competition, and it is timed, but it is not recorded or shown to the viewers. The plates which the audience sees prepared during the one-hour battle are the plates used to obtain close-up footage of the dish for use in the final episode. Usually, on taping days, two different battles will be taped, one beginning at about 10 a.m. and the second at about 4 p.m. A Food Network crew has about 90 minutes between each show to clean the set and prepare for the second show.

Chefs provide the producers with shopping lists for each of the possible secret ingredients. Consequently, they can surmise what the secret ingredient will be just before it is officially revealed, based on which of their items were purchased.

=== Special battles ===
ICA will occasionally stage special themed battles, generally during the holiday period. The first of these was held on November 12, 2006. A special 90-minute episode of Iron Chef America pitted two guest Food Network personalities, Giada De Laurentiis and Rachael Ray, the latter of whom does not consider herself a chef due to lack of formal training, against each other after they each received tips and training from Iron Chefs Bobby Flay and Mario Batali, respectively. While the early part of the episode made it appear as though it would be a head-to-head battle, the chairman announced just prior to the secret ingredient reveal that it would in fact be a tag-team battle, with each of the women joined by the Iron Chef who trained her. The secret ingredient for the special was cranberries. The expanded timeframe allowed for longer cuts of the competition hour and the tasting segments to be presented. The battle was won by Iron Chef Batali and guest chef Ray.

A second special holiday episode premiered on Sunday, November 25, 2007. This special, titled Iron Chef America: All Star Holiday Dessert Battle, paired Iron Chef Cat Cora and popular Food Network personality Paula Deen against fellow Food Network chefs Tyler Florence and Robert Irvine, with sugar as the secret ingredient. Iron Chef Cora and guest chef Deen's team emerged victorious.

On October 26, 2008, a Halloween battle took place between Iron Chef Michael Symon and former Next Iron Chef competitor Chris Cosentino. The theme ingredient was offal (organ meats, pig trotters, coxcombs, and others), an ingredient with which each of the chefs is known to cook routinely. Igor and the Monster from the Broadway production of Young Frankenstein also made a special appearance, assisting with the presentation of the secret ingredient. The victory went to Iron Chef Symon.

A 90-minute "Thanksgiving Showdown" premiered on November 16, 2008. The secret ingredients were foods that might have been used at the first Thanksgiving feast: duck, lobster, heritage turkey, venison, leeks and walnuts. This battle marked the first time that the American Iron Chefs competed against each other, with Flay and Symon battling Cora and Morimoto. There were two floor reporters for this special: Brauch covered Flay and Symon while ICA judge Ted Allen covered Cora and Morimoto. Mark Ecko appeared early in the episode to present the new Iron Chef jackets and describe the design process. Iron Chefs Flay and Symon defeated Iron Chefs Cora and Morimoto by one point.

First Lady Michelle Obama's White House Kitchen Garden was featured in a new special episode on January 3, 2010. "The Super Chef Battle", featured Iron Chef Batali and Super Chef Emeril Lagasse against Iron Chef Flay and White House Executive Chef Cristeta Comerford in a battle to create an American meal, with the produce from the White House garden as the secret ingredient. First Lady Obama made a special appearance, welcoming the chefs to the White House, and announcing the secret ingredient. The chairman was not present in Kitchen Stadium; although the chairman appeared on video, and presented a supplemental range of sustainable foods to be used in the battle, Brown started the battle with the traditional "Allez cuisine!" This battle was also the first that carried a prize: $25,000 was donated to City Meals, a New York charity similar to Meals on Wheels in the names of the winning team. Iron Chef Flay and Chef Comerford defeated Iron Chefs Batali and Lagasse.

On January 2, 2011, "Battle Deep Freeze" aired. The show featured Iron Chef Symon and Chef Anne Burrell facing off against Iron Chef Cora and Chef Robert Irvine. There was no formal secret ingredient; the theme was "deep freeze." The chefs had to prepare five dishes, each with a frozen component, on five themes: fruits and vegetables, meat, aromatics, seafood, and alcohol. The dishes were either served in or accented by ice carvings.

=== Greatest moments ===
On November 16, 2008, the Food Network preceded its "Thanksgiving Showdown" ICA special with a half-hour retrospective of the 10 "best" ICA moments:

Number	Title	Battle	Competitors	Moment
1	"It's Alive!"	Cobia	Batali v. Jamie Oliver	Sous-chef Gennaro Contaldo's distraction antics
2	"Sugar Smack"	Sugar	Cora/Paula Deen v. Tyler Florence/Robert Irvine	Deen's verbal warfare
3	"The Bird is the Word"	Garlic	Batali v. Chris Cosentino	Chef Cosentino presents squab brains and talons.
4	"Better Dining Through Science"	Beets	Morimoto v. Homaro Cantu	In an upset, the molecular gastronomists take the battle.
5	"Trout in the Machine"	Trout	Flay v. Hiroyuki Sakai	Trout ice cream
6	"Edible Art"	Asparagus	Morimoto v. Symon	Morimoto's "stained glass" sushi
7	"I Fought the Clock and the Clock Won"	Scallops	Morimoto v. Roberto Donna	Donna fails to complete his five dishes.
8	"The Wheel's on Fire"	Parmigiano Reggiano	Batali v. Andrew Carmellini	Batali's Parmesan bowl filled with flaming grappa
9	"Smokin' Hot"	Chiles	Morimoto v. Tim Love	Morimoto struggles with an unfamiliar ingredient: a jalapeño chile.
10	"Size Matters"	Elk	Flay v. Kent and Kevin Rathbun	The chefs battle each other and the largest secret ingredient ever.

== Production details ==
=== Kitchen Stadium ===
Located at the Chelsea Market in New York City, Iron Chef America's version of Kitchen Stadium has a more modern appearance than the one featured in Iron Chef. Much of the equipment in the kitchen is top-of-the line; appliances include six-burner stove tops, an infrared grill, blast chillers, convection ovens, deep fryers, cutting boards, a plethora of small electrical appliances like blenders and food processors, as well as pantry stations. Both kitchens in Kitchen Stadium are set up with the same appliances, and each pantry station has the same food items including expensive items like saffron. Challengers may bring their own equipment to their sections; postmodern chef Homaro Cantu brought a Class 4 laser, liquid nitrogen, and an inkjet printer with edible inks and paper for his signature dishes. One of the most infamous appliances in the kitchen is the ice cream machine (dubbed the "Ice Cream Machine of Doom" by the commentators), which is often used to create unusual and abstract flavors of ice cream when chefs attempt to make a dessert course with the theme ingredient.

The commentator's station features Alton Brown standing in front of two large monitors feeding him camera angles from both sides of Kitchen Stadium. To stay informed, he also keeps his laptop open to reference an extensive food database and, in later seasons, an iPad to look up ingredients on the fly. An earbud allows him to be fed information from the culinary producer, who in turn is fed information from two culinary spotters on the floor. The station is much closer to and on the same level as the cooking stations, allowing Brown to converse with the competitors and ask brief questions.

There is a small section in the back of the stadium reserved for the studio audience, which is mostly composed of guests of the chefs. During the first two seasons, the audience is almost never mentioned or shown on camera unless there is a special guest in the audience. Starting with season 3, the show again takes a cue from its predecessor and gives a little more attention to the audience, particularly when someone close to the challenger or special guests are present. The audience is also now sometimes heard applauding the chefs, although they are ignored by cameras.

Despite Kitchen Stadium America's state-of-the-art appearance, problems arose during the first season. In her battle against Mario Batali, Chef Anita Lo had trouble getting her burners hot enough to cook her food. At one point, one of Lo's assistants took a pot over to Mario Batali's side of the kitchen to use his stove, to which Batali happily agreed. In several battles contestants have experienced technical problems with the ice cream machine. Though there have not been serious injuries in Kitchen Stadium America, several contestants have suffered minor cuts from knife slips.

In the Behind the Scenes: Iron Chef America special, Iron Chef Hiroyuki Sakai voices his distaste for the modern look of the American Kitchen Stadium. Sakai referred to the kitchen as "cold."

=== Subtitles and dubbing ===
Morimoto speaks English with a thick Japanese accent, and he sometimes speaks in Japanese when describing his dishes. Consequently, his voice is at times dubbed by Joe Cipriano. Cipriano, a veteran TV announcer and Los Angeles radio personality, also provided the voice for Hiroyuki Sakai in Battle of the Masters. When his voice is not dubbed, subtitles may be provided to help viewers understand what Morimoto is saying.

== Companion shows ==
=== Countdown ===
Iron Chef America Countdown premiered in 2012. Each half-hour episode features a countdown of five moments on a theme from the television series. The show uses clips from Iron Chef America, as well as commentary from people who participated in the featured moments.

=== The Next Iron Chef ===
In 2007, a competition was held to determine who among eight chefs would become the next Iron Chef. The show ran for six episodes, and followed the contestants through a series of eight culinary challenges taking place in the United States, France, and Germany. Contestants were eliminated by a panel of judges at the end of each episode, until the final two chefs returned to the United States to compete in Kitchen Stadium. The final battle featured swordfish as the secret ingredient, and was judged by Iron Chefs Flay, Cora, and Morimoto. Chef Michael Symon was declared the winner of the competition and subsequently joined Iron Chef America.

A second season of The Next Iron Chef pitted ten chefs against one another for the title of Iron Chef beginning in October 2009. This season ran for eight episodes, during which the contestants competed in culinary challenges held in the United States and Japan. Contestants were eliminated by a panel of judges at the end of each episode until the finale, in which chefs Jehangir Mehta and Jose Garces returned to the United States to compete in Kitchen Stadium. The final battle featured various racks and ribs (pork, buffalo, and beef) as the secret ingredient, and was judged by the panel along with Iron Chefs Flay, Morimoto, and Symon. Chef Jose Garces was declared the winner of the competition, and joined Iron Chef America as its newest Iron Chef. Garces made his debut as an Iron Chef on January 17, 2010, against Seattle chefs Rachel Yang and Seif Chirchi in Battle Hawaiian Moi, with Iron Chef Garces emerging victorious. Jose Garces went on to receive the first perfect score ever in Season 9 (see List of Episodes).

Food Network launched its third season of The Next Iron Chef in October 2010. Competition took place in Los Angeles, before moving to Las Vegas. The final battle took place in Kitchen Stadium between Chefs Marco Canora and Marc Forgione, with traditional Thanksgiving proteins, such as turkey, lobster and venison as the secret ingredient. Chef Marc Forgione was declared the winner of the third season of "The Next Iron Chef" on November 21, 2010. His first battle took place on November 28, 2010, against Washington, D.C.–based Chef RJ Cooper.

In October 2011, a fourth season of The Next Iron Chef premiered featuring super chefs like Alex Guarnaschelli, Anne Burrell, Robert Irvine, among others. The December 18 battle in Kitchen Stadium featured Geoffrey Zakarian and Elizabeth Falkner. Zakarian prevailed and was named the winner. His first battle aired on December 25, 2011, during which he emerged victorious, being the second chef ever to receive a perfect overall score of 60 on Iron Chef America.

The fifth season of The Next Iron Chef in November 2012 featured eight chefs who had previously competed on the show, plus two newcomers. In the final battle, Alex Guarnaschelli defeated Amanda Freitag, becoming the second female Iron Chef, as well as the first female to win the competition. She made her debut as an Iron Chef on December 30, 2012, against Judy Joo from Iron Chef UK. Iron Chef Joo previously judged season 4 of The Next Iron Chef, in which Guarnaschelli had competed and lost. Iron Chef Guarnaschelli was ultimately declared the winner.

=== Iron Chef Gauntlet ===
In 2017 a reboot of the Iron Chef and Iron Chef America was created and is hosted by Alton Brown, who also takes over as the series' Chairman. In this Seven chefs from around the country battle each other in an elimination contest, with the last chef remaining then facing a "gauntlet" challenge of defeating three other Iron Chefs in order to earn the title of Iron Chef. There have been two seasons so far with one winner, Chef Stephanie Izard.

== Video game ==
An Iron Chef America video game, titled Iron Chef America: Supreme Cuisine, was developed for the Wii and Nintendo DS by Black Lantern Studios and published by Destineer. Both versions were released on November 6, 2008, having been delayed from the original release date of September 23, 2008.

The game features "a series of fast-paced and intense culinary challenges" and includes the voice acting and likeness of The Chairman (Mark Dacascos), commentator Alton Brown and Iron Chefs Mario Batali, Masaharu Morimoto and Cat Cora, who players can either play or compete against. The Wii version of the game has received mediocre to slightly unfavorable reviews, with an average score of 42% determined by critical score aggregator Metacritic. The DS version of the game has received overall better scores, with median review score of 62%.
