= Worst Cooks in America season 22 =

Worst Cooks in America
- Season 22
- Judges: Anne Burrell; Michael Symon
- No. of contestants: 8
- Winner: Mercedes “Sadie” Manda
- Winning mentor: Anne Burrell
- Runner-up: Domaine Javier
- No. of episodes: 6

Release
- Original network: Food Network
- Original release: April 25 – May 30, 2021

Season chronology
- ← Previous; Season 21 Next → Season 23

Worst Cooks in America 22, also known as Best of the Worst, is the twenty-second season of the American competitive reality television series Worst Cooks in America. This is the first iteration of the all-star editions. This season It premiered on Food Network on April 25, 2021 and concluded on May 30, 2021. Mercedes “Sadie” Manda was the winner of this season, with Domaine Javier as the runner-up.

== Format ==
Worst Cooks in America is an American reality television series in which former contestants (referred to as "recruits") with poor cooking skills undergo a culinary boot camp for the chance to win $25,000 and a Food Network cooking set. The recruits are trained on the various basic cooking techniques including baking, knife skills, temperature, seasoning and preparation. Each episode features two core challenges: the Skills Drill, which tests their grasp of basic techniques demonstrated by the chef mentors, and the Main Dish Challenge, where they must apply those skills to recreate or invent a more complex dish under specific guidelines. The weakest performer is eliminated at the end of each episode. The final two contestants prepare a restaurant-quality, three-course meal for a panel of food critics, who evaluate the dishes based on taste, presentation, and overall improvement.

== Judges ==
Michael Symon joins Anne Burrell for the first time to host a new Best of the Worst season where fan-favorite recruits from past seasons return for another chance at redemption. The season premiered on April 25, 2021.

== Recruits ==
Contestant	Hometown	Occupation	Team	Status
Mercedes “Sadie” Manda; Season 17	Pittsburgh, Pennsylvania	Non-Profit Associate	Anne	Winner on May 30, 2021
Domaine Javier; Season 20	San Gabriel, California	Trans Actress, Writer, Nurse	Michael	Runner-up on May 30, 2021
Stephanie James; Season 21	Chicago, Illinois	Postal Clerk	Anne	Finalist on May 30, 2021
Dr. Lulu Boykin; Season 18	Pittsboro, North Carolina	Teaching Artist	Michael	Finalist on May 30, 2021
Jefferson Goldie; Season 18	Chicago, Illinois	Musician	Michael	Eliminated on May 23, 2021
Jonathan Beyer; Season 17	New York, New York	Opera Singer	Anne	Eliminated May 16, 2021
Eric Smart; Season 20	Los Angeles, California	Special Investigator	Michael	Eliminated on May 9, 2021
Joey Kinsley; Season 21	Cleveland, Ohio	Digital Marketing Specialist	Anne	Eliminated on May 2, 2021

== Elimination Chart ==
Team Anne
Team Michael

Rank	Contestant	Episode					
Rank	Contestant	1	2	3	4	5	6
1	Sadie	WIN	IN	WIN	IN	WIN	WINNER
2	Domaine	WIN	IN	IN	IN	WIN	RUNNER-UP
3	Stephanie	IN	WIN	BTM	WIN	BTM	FINALIST
4	Lulu	IN	IN	WIN	WIN	IN	FINALIST
5	Jefferson	BTM	BTM	IN	BTM	OUT	
6	Jonathan	BTM	IN	IMM	OUT		
7	Eric	IN	WIN	OUT			
8	Joey	IN	OUT				

Key
(WINNER) This contestant won the competition and was crowned "Best of the Worst".
(RUNNER-UP) The contestant was the runner-up in the finals of the competition.
(FINALIST) The contestant was a finalist in the finals of the competition.
(IMM) The contestant won immunity and was safe from elimination in the week's Main Dish Challenge.
(WIN) The contestant did the best on their team in the week's Main Dish challenge or Skill Drill and was considered the winner.
(BTM) The contestant was selected as one of the bottom entries in the Main Dish challenge but was not eliminated.
(OUT) The contestant lost that week's Main Dish challenge and was out of the competition.

== Episodes ==
No. overall	No. in season	Title	Original release date
161	1	"Best of the Worst: Ready for Redemption"	April 25, 2021
162	2	"Best of the Worst: Viva Las Boot Camp"	May 2, 2021
163	3	"Best of the Worst: Happy Campers"	May 9, 2021
164	4	"Best of the Worst: Fly Me to the Flavor"	May 16, 2021
165	5	"Best of the Worst: Choux Ready for This?"	May 23, 2021
166	6	"Best of the Worst: No Cuts, No Glory"	May 30, 2021
