= Worst Cooks in America =

American reality television series

- Genre: Reality television; Cooking show
- Country of origin: United States
- No. of seasons: 30
- No. of episodes: 226

Production
- Executive producers: Rowena DeLaRosa; Bob Kirsh; Nicola Moody; Pip Wells
- Production location: New York City
- Running time: 60–90 minutes
- Production company: Optomen Productions, Inc.

Original release
- Network: Food Network
- Release: January 3, 2010 – present

Related
- Worst Bakers in America

Worst Cooks in America is an American reality television series that premiered on January 3, 2010, on Food Network. The show takes 12 to 16 contestants (referred to as "recruits") with very poor cooking skills through a culinary boot camp, to earn a cash prize of $25,000 and a Food Network cooking set. In the celebrity edition of the show, the winning celebrity gets a $50,000 prize to donate to the charity of their choice. The recruits are trained on the various basic cooking techniques including baking, knife skills, temperature, seasoning and preparation. The final challenge is to cook a restaurant-quality, three-course meal for three food critics.

== Mentors ==
Worst Cooks in America mentors
Mentor	Seasons																													
Mentor	1	2	3	4	5	6	7	8	9	10	11	12	13	14	15	16	17	18	19	20	21	22	23	24	25	26	27	28	29	30
Anne Burrell																														
Beau MacMillan																														
Robert Irvine																														
Bobby Flay																														
Tyler Florence																														
Rachael Ray																														
Alton Brown																														
Alex Guarnaschelli																														
Carla Hall																														
Michael Symon																														
Cliff Crooks																														
Jeff Mauro																														
Darnell Ferguson																														
Tiffany Derry																														
Antonia Lofaso																														
Gabriele Bertaccini																														

== Series overview ==
Season	Episodes	Originally released			Recruits	Winner	Runner–up	Winning Mentor
Season	Episodes	First released	Last released	Network	Recruits	Winner	Runner–up	Winning Mentor
1	6	January 3, 2010	February 1, 2010	Food Network	12	Rachel Coleman	Jennifer "Jenny" Cross	Anne Burrell (1/15)
2	8	January 2, 2011	February 20, 2011	Food Network	16	Joshua "Joshie" Berger	Georgann "Georg" Coleman	Anne Burrell (2/15)
3	8	February 12, 2012	April 1, 2012	Food Network	16	Kelli Powers	Vinnie Caligiuri	Anne Burrell (3/15)
4	7	February 17, 2013	March 31, 2013	Food Network	14	Alina Bolshakova	Rasheeda Brown	Bobby Flay (1/3)
5	7	February 17, 2014	March 31, 2014	Food Network	14	Amber Brauner	Jamie Thomas	Bobby Flay (2/3)
6	7	January 4, 2015	February 15, 2015	Food Network	14	Kristen Redmond	Genique Freeman	Anne Burrell (4/15)
7	6	September 23, 2015	October 28, 2015	Food Network	7	Jenni "JWoww" Farley	Kendra Wilkinson	Anne Burrell (5/15)
8	7	January 4, 2016	February 16, 2016	Food Network	14	Nick Slater	Lawrence Crawford	Anne Burrell (6/15)
9	8	September 14, 2016	November 2, 2016	Food Network	9	Loni Love	Nicole Sullivan	Rachael Ray (1/2)
10	10	January 1, 2017	March 5, 2017	Food Network	16	Daniel Mar	Ann Odogwu	Anne Burrell (7/15)
11	8	September 23, 2017	October 11, 2017	Food Network	8	Perez Hilton	Melissa Peterman	Rachael Ray (2/2)
12	10	January 7, 2018	March 11, 2018	Food Network	16	Hazell Mckenzie	Steven Crowley	Anne Burrell (8/15)
13	6	April 15, 2018	May 20, 2018	Food Network	7	La Toya Jackson	Ian Ziering	Tyler Florence (1/1)
14	7	August 12, 2018	September 24, 2018	Food Network	14	Bradley Garcia	Sarah Harris	Robert Irvine (1/1)
15	9	January 6, 2019	March 3, 2019	Food Network	15	Allison Wolfe	Brittany Carel	Anne Burrell (9/15)
16	7	April 21, 2019	June 2, 2019	Food Network	8	Tonya Harding	Alec Mapa	Anne Burrell (10/15)
17	8	August 4, 2019	September 22, 2019	Food Network	14	Adrian Read	Juliann Sheldon	Bobby Flay (3/3)
18	10	January 5, 2020	March 8, 2020	Food Network	16	Shannon Akins	Leo Lech	Anne Burrell (11/15)
19	7	May 10, 2020	June 14, 2020	Food Network	7	Wells Adams	Johnny Bananas	Anne Burrell (12/15)
20	8	June 21, 2020	September 2, 2020	Food Network	14	Ariel "Ari" Robinson	Zack Ignoffo	Alex Guarnaschelli (1/1)
21	8	January 3, 2021	February 28, 2021	Food Network	14	Amber Leverette	Cameron Bartlett	Carla Hall (1/1)
22	6	April 25, 2021	May 30, 2021	Food Network	8	Mercedes “Sadie” Manda	Domaine Javier	Anne Burrell (13/15)
23	8	January 5, 2022	February 23, 2022	Food Network	12	Peachez Iman-Cummings	Marti Cummings	Cliff Crooks (1/1)
24	7	April 24, 2022	May 29, 2022	Food Network	9	Tracey Gold	Jodie Sweetin	Anne Burrell (14/15)
25	8	January 1, 2023	February 5, 2023	Food Network	12	Nick Trawick	Michael Judson Berry	Anne Burrell (15/15)
26	8	August 6, 2023	September 10, 2023	Food Network	16	Jessica Singer	Samantha "Sami" White	Jeff Mauro (1/1)
27	6	January 7, 2024	February 4, 2024	Food Network	16	Stacey Loper	Leona McTaggart-Chapman	Tiffany Derry (1/1)
28	7	January 5, 2025	February 2, 2025	Food Network	10	Corinne Olympios	Adam Rippon	Antonia Lofaso (1/1)
29	7	July 28, 2025	September 1, 2025	Food Network	16	Todd Zimmerman	Cari Westerman	Gabriele Bertaccini (1/1)
30	7	January 4, 2026	February 1, 2026	Food Network	10	Reza Farahan	Beverley Mitchell	Tiffany Derry (2/2)

== Mentor records ==
Mentor	Wins	Losses	Win Pct.%
Tiffany Derry	2	0	100%
Carla Hall	1	0	100%
Cliff Crooks	1	0	100%
Alex Guarnaschelli	1	0	100%
Antonia Lofaso	1	0	100%
Gabriele Bertaccini	1	0	100%
Bobby Flay	3	1	75%
Anne Burrell	15	13	54%
Rachael Ray	2	2	50%
Robert Irvine	1	1	50%
Jeff Mauro	1	3	25%
Tyler Florence	1	6	14%
Alton Brown	0	1	0%
Beau MacMillan	0	1	0%
Darnell Ferguson	0	1	0%
Michael Symon	0	1	0%
