= Worst Cooks in America season 27 =

Worst Cooks in America
- Season 27
- Judges: Anne Burrell; Tiffany Derry
- No. of contestants: 16
- Winner: Stacey Loper
- Winning mentor: Tiffany Derry
- Runner-up: Leona McTaggart-Chapman
- No. of episodes: 7

Release
- Original network: Food Network
- Original release: January 7 – February 4, 2024

Season chronology
- ← Previous; Season 26 Next → Season 28

Worst Cooks in America 27, also known as Spoiled Rotten, is the twenty-seventh season of the American competitive reality television series Worst Cooks in America. It premiered on Food Network on January 7, 2024 and concluded on February 4, 2024. Stacey Loper was the winner of this season, with Leona McTaggart-Chapman as the runner-up.

== Format ==
Worst Cooks in America is an American reality television series in which contestants (referred to as "recruits") with poor cooking skills undergo a culinary boot camp for the chance to win $25,000 and a Food Network cooking set. The recruits are trained on the various basic cooking techniques including baking, knife skills, temperature, seasoning and preparation. Each episode features two core challenges: the Skills Drill, which tests their grasp of basic techniques demonstrated by the chef mentors, and the Main Dish Challenge, where they must apply those skills to recreate or invent a more complex dish under specific guidelines. The weakest performer is eliminated at the end of each episode. The final two contestants prepare a restaurant-quality, three-course meal for a panel of food critics, who evaluate the dishes based on taste, presentation, and overall improvement.

== Judges ==
Tiffany Derry joins Anne Burrell to host Spoiled Rotten. The season premiered on January 7, 2024.

== Recruits ==
Contestant	Hometown	Occupation	Team	Status
Stacey Loper	Hoover, Alabama	Grief Recovery Counselor	Tiffany	Winner on February 4, 2024
Leona McTaggart-Chapman	Cresaptown, Maryland	Day Program Manager	Anne	Runner-up on February 4, 2024
Carrington Gilbert	Houston, Texas	Stay-At-Home Daughter	Anne	Finalist on February 4, 2024
Micaela Minner	Akron, Ohio	Pro Softball Player	Tiffany	Finalist on February 4, 2024
Erika Coleman	New Orleans, Louisiana	Makeup Artist and Stylist	Anne	Eliminated on February 4, 2024
Chelsko Thompson	Seattle, Washington	Social Media Manager	Tiffany	Eliminated on February 4, 2024
Jesse Money	Malibu, California	Singer/Songwriter	Anne	Eliminated on January 28, 2024
Serious Williams	Chicago, Illinois	Psychiatric Assistant	Tiffany	Eliminated on January 28, 2024
Ebie Wright	Los Angeles, California	Pop Singer	Tiffany	Eliminated on January 28, 2024
Frankie Cena	Burbank, California	Public Speaking Academy Manager and former Mr. Canada	Anne	Eliminated on January 28, 2024
Avi Boodram	Christiana, Delaware	Investment Banker	Anne	Eliminated on January 21, 2024
Joel Alvarado	Indianapolis, Indiana	Goober TV Character Impersonator	Tiffany	Eliminated on January 21, 2024
Steve Crawford	Los Angeles, California	Magician	Anne	Eliminated on January 14, 2024
Costa Georgopoulos	San Pablo, California	Maintenance Painter	Tiffany	Eliminated on January 14, 2024
Elena Catlin	Wesley Chapel, Florida	Teacher, Piano player and Author	-	Eliminated on January 7, 2024
Cathy Jacobson	Vernon Hills, Illinois	Dance Teacher	-	Eliminated on January 7, 2024

== Episodes ==
No. overall	No. in season	Title	Original release date
199	1	"Spoiled Rotten: Spoon Fed"	January 1, 2023
200	2	"Spoiled Rotten: Culinary Cadets"	January 8, 2023
201	3	"Spoiled Rotten: Deep Dish Disasters"	January 15, 2023
202	4	"Spoiled Rotten: Supermarket Speedway"	January 22, 2023
203	5	"Spoiled Rotten: From Farm to Fumble"	January 22, 2023
204	6	"Spoiled Rotten: Bake It Till You Make"	January 29, 2023
205	7	"Spoiled Rotten: Fight for the Finale"	January 29, 2023
