= Worst Cooks in America season 7 =

Worst Cooks in America
- Season 7
- Judges: Anne Burrell; Rachael Ray
- No. of contestants: 7
- Winner: Jenni "JWoww" Farley
- Winning mentor: Anne Burrell
- Runner-up: Kendra Wilkinson
- No. of episodes: 6

Release
- Original network: Food Network
- Original release: September 23 – October 28, 2015

Season chronology
- ← Previous; Season 6 Next → Season 8

Worst Cooks in America 7, also known as Celebrity Edition, is the seventh season of the American competitive reality television series Worst Cooks in America. This is the first iteration of the celebrity editions. It premiered on Food Network on September 23, 2015 and concluded on October 28, 2015. Jenni "JWoww" Farley was the winner of this season, with Kendra Wilkinson as the runner-up.

== Format ==
Worst Cooks in America (Celebrity Edition) is an American reality television series in which celebrities (referred to as "recruits") with poor cooking skills undergo a culinary boot camp for the chance to win a $50,000 prize to donate to the charity of their choice. The recruits are trained on the various basic cooking techniques including baking, knife skills, temperature, seasoning and preparation. Each episode features two core challenges: the Skills Drill, which tests their grasp of basic techniques demonstrated by the chef mentors, and the Main Dish Challenge, where they must apply those skills to recreate or invent a more complex dish under specific guidelines. The weakest performer is eliminated at the end of each episode. The final two contestants prepare a restaurant-quality, three-course meal for a panel of food critics, who evaluate the dishes based on taste, presentation, and overall improvement.

== Judges ==
Rachael Ray joins Anne Burrell to host season 7. The winner earns a $50,000 donation for their chosen charity. Because this season had only 7 total recruits, each team's worst recruit from that week's Main Dish challenge competed head to head in a quickfire elimination challenge instead of eliminating both recruits each week. This challenge involved more basic cooking techniques (e.g. knife skills) and the winner would be decided by a blind judging from both Anne and Rachael. The winning recruit stayed in the competition while the losing recruit was eliminated.

== Recruits ==
| Contestant | Age | Occupation | Team | Status |
|---|---|---|---|---|
| Jenni "JWoww" Farley | 29 | Reality Television Star | Anne | Winner on October 28, 2015 |
| Kendra Wilkinson | 30 | Former Playboy Model & Television Personality | Rachael | Runner-up on October 28, 2015 |
| Ellen Cleghorne | 49 | Saturday Night Live Actress | Rachael | Eliminated on October 21, 2015 |
| Barry Williams | 60 | The Brady Bunch Actor | Anne | Eliminated on October 14, 2015 |
| Chris Soules | 33 | The Bachelor Star | Anne | Eliminated on October 7, 2015 |
| Jaleel White | 38 | Actor, Television Host | Rachael | Eliminated on September 30, 2015 |
| Dean Cain | 48 | Television Actor | - | Eliminated on September 23, 2015 |

== Elimination Chart ==
Team Anne
Team Rachael

| Rank | Contestant | Episode | | | | | |
| Rank | Contestant | 1 | 2 | 3 | 4 | 5 | 6 |
|---|---|---|---|---|---|---|---|
| 1 | Jenni | IN | WIN | IN | WIN | WIN | WINNER |
| 2 | Kendra | IN | WIN | BTM | WIN | BTM | RUNNER-UP |
| 3 | Ellen | IN | IN | WIN | BTM | OUT | |
| 4 | Barry | BTM | BTM | WIN | OUT | | |
| 5 | Chris | IN | IN | OUT | | | |
| 6 | Jaleel | IN | OUT | | | | |
| 7 | Dean | OUT | | | | | |

Key
(WINNER) This contestant won the competition and was crowned "Best of the Worst".
(RUNNER-UP) The contestant was the runner-up in the finals of the competition.
(WIN) The contestant did the best on their team in the week's Main Dish challenge or Skill Drill and was considered the winner.
(BTM) The contestant was selected as one of the bottom entries in the Main Dish challenge, but was not eliminated.
(OUT) The contestant lost that week's Main Dish challenge and was out of the competition.

== Episodes ==
| No. overall | No. in season | Title | Original release date |
|---|---|---|---|
| 44 | 1 | "Celebrity Pot-un-lucky" | September 23, 2015 |
| 45 | 2 | "Takeout or Get Out" | September 30, 2015 |
| 46 | 3 | "Celebrity Showdown" | October 7, 2015 |
| 47 | 4 | "Riddle Me This" | October 14, 2015 |
| 48 | 5 | "Tapas Can't Stop Us" | October 21, 2015 |
| 49 | 6 | "Final Food Fight" | October 28, 2015 |
