= Worst Cooks in America season 23 =

Worst Cooks in America
- Season 23
- Judges: Anne Burrell; Cliff Crooks
- No. of contestants: 12
- Winner: Peachez Iman-Cummings
- Winning mentor: Cliff Crooks
- Runner-up: Marti Cummings
- No. of episodes: 8

Release
- Original network: Food Network
- Original release: January 5 – February 23, 2022

Season chronology
- ← Previous; Season 22 Next → Season 24

Worst Cooks in America 23, is the twenty-third season of the American competitive reality television series Worst Cooks in America. It premiered on Food Network on January 5, 2022 and concluded on February 23, 2022. Peachez Iman-Cummings was the winner of this season, with Marti Cummings as the runner-up.

== Format ==
Worst Cooks in America is an American reality television series in which contestants (referred to as "recruits") with poor cooking skills undergo a culinary boot camp for the chance to win $25,000 and a Food Network cooking set. The recruits are trained on the various basic cooking techniques including baking, knife skills, temperature, seasoning and preparation. Each episode features two core challenges: the Skills Drill, which tests their grasp of basic techniques demonstrated by the chef mentors, and the Main Dish Challenge, where they must apply those skills to recreate or invent a more complex dish under specific guidelines. The weakest performer is eliminated at the end of each episode. The final two contestants prepare a restaurant-quality, three-course meal for a panel of food critics, who evaluate the dishes based on taste, presentation, and overall improvement.

== Judges ==
Cliff Crooks joins Anne Burrell to host season 23. The season debuted on January 5, 2022.

This season features two additional twists. First, the cast includes 5 pairs of recruits with previously established relationships: Angie & Cheyenne (long-lost cousins), Bianca & Hector (married), Deneise & Hilda (neighbors), Eddie & Kara (married), and Marti & Peachez (best friends). Second, this season features alternating elimination weeks for each team, with the winning recruit on the non-eliminating team receiving a $1,000 prize each week.

== Recruits ==
Contestant	Hometown	Occupation	Team	Status
Peachez Iman-Cummings	New York City	Drag performer	Cliff	Winner on February 23, 2022
Marti Cummings	New York City	Drag Artist	Anne	Runner-up on February 23, 2022
Kara Anderson	Leitchfield, Kentucky	English Teacher	Anne	Finalist on February 23, 2022
Cheyenne Loomis	London, Kentucky	Case Worker	Cliff	Finalist on February 23, 2022
Eddie Anderson	Leitchfield, Kentucky	Art Teacher	Cliff	Eliminated on February 16, 2022
Hilda Ike	Poinciana, Florida	Fitness Instructor	Anne	Eliminated on February 16, 2022
Bianca Bencosme	York, Pennsylvania	Stay-At-Home Mom	Cliff	Eliminated on February 9, 2022
Al Kingswriter	Tony, Wisconsin	Truck Driver	Anne	Eliminated on February 9, 2022
Angie Hartford-Padilla	San Jose, California	Executive Assistant	Anne	Eliminated on February 2, 2022
Melody Moore	Atlanta, Georgia	Beauty Bar Owner	Cliff	Withdrew on January 26, 2022
Hector Peralta	York, Pennsylvania	Data Analyst	Anne	Eliminated on January 19, 2022
Deneise White	Poinciana, Florida	IT Manager	Cliff	Eliminated on January 12, 2022

== Elimination Chart ==
Team Anne
Team Cliff

Rank	Contestant	Episode							
Rank	Contestant	1	2	3	4	5	6	7	8
1	Peachez	IN	WIN	IN	BTM	WIN	WIN	WIN	WINNER
2	Marti	IN	IN	WIN	IN	IN	WIN	BTM	RUNNER-UP
3	Kara	IN	BTM	IN	IN	WIN	IN	WIN	FINALIST
4	Cheyenne	IN	IN	IN	BTM*	IN	BTM	BTM	FINALIST
5	Eddie	IN	IN	IN	WIN	IN	IN	OUT	
6	Hilda	IN	WIN	BTM	IN	IN	BTM	OUT	
7	Bianca	IN	IN	WIN	IN	IN	OUT		
8	Al	IN	IN	IN	IN	BTM	OUT		
9	Angie	WIN	IN	IN	WIN	OUT			
10	Melody	IN	IN	IN	WDR				
11	Hector	BTM	IN	OUT					
12	Deneise	BTM	OUT						

Key
(WINNER) This contestant won the competition and was crowned "Best of the Worst".
(RUNNER-UP) The contestant was the runner-up in the finals of the competition.
(FINALIST) The contestant was a finalist in the finals of the competition.
(WIN) The contestant did the best on their team in the week's Main Dish Challenge and was considered the winner.
(BTM) The contestant was selected as one of the bottom entries in the Main Dish challenge but was not eliminated.
(OUT) The contestant lost that week's Main Dish challenge and was out of the competition.
(WDR) The contestant withdrew from the competition.

== Episodes ==
No. overall	No. in season	Title	Original release date
167	1	"Welcome to the Disaster Zone"	January 5, 2022
168	2	"Worst Cook Warriors"	January 12, 2022
169	3	"Beach Bites"	January 19, 2022
170	4	"Don't Lose Your Noodle"	January 26, 2022
171	5	"Queen of Tarts"	February 2, 2022
172	6	"The Good, The Bad and The Burnt"	February 9, 2022
173	7	"Kitchen Ballers"	February 16, 2022
174	8	"Let's Make a Meal!"	February 23, 2022
