= Worst Cooks in America season 20 =

Worst Cooks in America
- Season 20
- Judges: Anne Burrell; Alex Guarnaschelli
- No. of contestants: 14
- Winner: Ariel "Ari" Robinson
- Winning mentor: Alex Guarnaschelli
- Runner-up: Zack Ignoffo
- No. of episodes: 7

Release
- Original network: Food Network
- Original release: June 21 – August 2, 2020

Season chronology
- ← Previous; Season 19 Next → Season 21

Worst Cooks in America 20, is the twentieth season of the American competitive reality television series Worst Cooks in America. It premiered on Food Network on June 21, 2020 and concluded on August 2, 2020. Ariel "Ari" Robinson was the winner of this season, with Zack Ignoffo as the runner-up.

== Format ==
Worst Cooks in America is an American reality television series in which contestants (referred to as "recruits") with poor cooking skills undergo a culinary boot camp for the chance to win $25,000 and a Food Network cooking set. The recruits are trained on the various basic cooking techniques including baking, knife skills, temperature, seasoning and preparation. Each episode features two core challenges: the Skills Drill, which tests their grasp of basic techniques demonstrated by the chef mentors, and the Main Dish Challenge, where they must apply those skills to recreate or invent a more complex dish under specific guidelines. The weakest performer is eliminated at the end of each episode. The final two contestants prepare a restaurant-quality, three-course meal for a panel of food critics, who evaluate the dishes based on taste, presentation, and overall improvement.

== Judges ==
Alex Guarnaschelli joined Anne Burrell to host season 20. The season debuted on June 21, 2020.

== Recruits ==
Contestant	Age	Hometown	Occupation	Team	Status
Ariel "Ari" Robinson	28	Simpsonville, South Carolina	Teacher	Alex	Winner on August 2, 2020
Zack Ignoffo	26	Chicago, Illinois	Model	Anne	Runner-up on August 2, 2020
Dolores Aguilar-Fernandez	45	Cypress, Texas	Recruiter	Anne	Eliminated on July 26, 2020
Darian Barnes	40	Rahway, New Jersey	Teacher/Ex-Football Player	Alex	Eliminated on July 26, 2020
Domaine Javier (Note: Domaine Javier is the first-ever openly transgender woman featured in the history of Food Network.)	28	San Gabriel, California	Nursing Supervisor/Trans Actress-Writer	Anne	Eliminated on July 19, 2020
Eric Smart	59	Los Angeles, California	Special Investigator	Alex	Eliminated on July 19, 2020
Louisa Sharamatyan (Note: Louisa Sharamatyan previously competed on the second season of Worst Bakers in America and placed last.)	30	Glendale, California	Social Media Manager	Alex	Eliminated on July 12, 2020
Evan Baker	35	Bismarck, North Dakota	Professional Fundraiser	Anne	Eliminated on July 12, 2020
Denise Schroder	47	Oklahoma City, Oklahoma	Real Estate Agent	Anne	Eliminated on July 5, 2020
Johannes "Yo" Phelps	46	Davenport, Iowa	Realtor	Alex	Eliminated on July 5, 2020
Erin Sullivan	38	Mayfield, Kentucky	Federal Employee	Anne	Eliminated on June 28, 2020
Brianna Weidenbach	24	Martin, Tennessee	Caregiver	Alex	Eliminated on June 28, 2020
Holly Brooks	66	Lancaster, Pennsylvania	Intuitive Psychic Counselor	Alex	Eliminated on June 21, 2020
Julie "Jewels" McIlroy	50	Syracuse, New York	Community Habilitation Specialist	Anne	Eliminated on June 21, 2020

== Elimination chart ==
Team Anne
Team Alex

Rank	Contestant	Episode								
Rank	Contestant	1	2	3	4		5		6	7
1	Ari	IN	WIN	WIN	IN	WIN	WIN	BTM	WIN	WINNER
2	Zack	WIN	IN	IN	IN	WIN	IN	WIN	WIN	RUNNER-UP
3	Dolores	IN	IN	WIN	WIN	IN	WIN	BTM	OUT	
4	Darian	IN	IN	IN	IN	IN	IN	WIN	OUT	
5	Domaine	IN	WIN	IN	IN	BTM	WIN	OUT		
6	Eric	IN	IN	BTM	IN	BTM	IN	OUT		
7	Louisa	IN	IN	IN	BTM	OUT				
8	Evan	IN	BTM	BTM	IN	OUT				
9	Denise	BTM	IN	OUT						
10	Yo	WIN	BTM	OUT						
11	Erin	IN	OUT							
12	Brianna	BTM	OUT							
13	Holly	OUT								
14	Jewels	OUT								

Key
(WINNER) This contestant won the competition and was crowned "Best of the Worst".
(RUNNER-UP) The contestant was the runner-up in the finals of the competition.
(WIN) The contestant did the best on their team in the week's Main Dish challenge or Skill Drill and was considered the winner.
(BTM) The contestant was selected as one of the bottom entries in the Main Dish challenge, but was not eliminated.
(OUT) The contestant lost that week's Main Dish challenge and was out of the competition.

== Episodes ==
No. overall	No. in season	Title	Original release date
146	1	"Doomed Dinners"	June 21, 2020
147	2	"Culinary Games"	June 28, 2020
148	3	"When in Boot Camp"	July 5, 2020
149	4	"Boardwalk Bites"	July 12, 2020
150	5	"The Cost of Cooking"	July 19, 2020
151	6	"Eat Your Heart Out"	July 26, 2020
152	7	"Fight for Food Fame"	August 2, 2020

== Controversy ==
Ariel "Ari" Robinson, the winner of the season, became the subject of significant controversy after her 2021 arrest and subsequent conviction related to the death of her three-year-old foster daughter. Robinson and her husband, Jerry "Austin" Robinson, were charged in January 2021 with homicide by child abuse following the death of Victoria "Tori" Rose Smith, who was found unresponsive in the couple’s home in Simpsonville, South Carolina and later died as a result of blunt force injuries according to a medical examination. As a result of the charges, Food Network removed Worst Cooks in America season 20 – including all streaming episodes and recaps – from its platforms such as Discovery+, Hulu, and YouTube on January 23, 2021.

After a four-day trial in May 2022, Robinson was found guilty of homicide by child abuse by a jury in Greenville County and was sentenced to life in prison, while her husband pleaded guilty to aiding and abetting homicide by child abuse and faced his own sentencing. Media reports also noted that in the period before her arrest, Robinson had made controversial public remarks concerning discipline and parenting, which drew additional scrutiny following the case, though these remarks were not part of court proceedings.
