= Worst Cooks in America season 28 =

Worst Cooks in America
- Season 28
- Judges: Antonia Lofaso; Jeff Mauro
- No. of contestants: 10
- Winner: Corinne Olympios
- Winning mentor: Antonia Lofaso
- Runner-up: Adam Rippon
- No. of episodes: 7

Release
- Original network: Food Network
- Original release: January 5 – February 2, 2025

Season chronology
- ← Previous; Season 27 Next → Season 29

Worst Cooks in America 28, also known as Celebrity Edition: Heroes vs. Villains, is the twenty-eighth season of the American competitive reality television series Worst Cooks in America. The season features a celebrity cast of Heroes vs. Villains. It premiered on Food Network on January 5, 2025 and concluded on February 2, 2025. Corinne Olympios was the winner of this season, with Adam Rippon as the runner-up.

== Format ==
Worst Cooks in America is an American reality television series in which celebrities (referred to as "recruits") with poor cooking skills undergo a culinary boot camp for the chance to win a $50,000 prize to donate to the charity of their choice. The recruits are trained on the various basic cooking techniques including baking, knife skills, temperature, seasoning and preparation. Each episode features two core challenges: the Skills Drill, which tests their grasp of basic techniques demonstrated by the chef mentors, and the Main Dish Challenge, where they must apply those skills to recreate or invent a more complex dish under specific guidelines. The weakest performer is eliminated at the end of each episode. The final two contestants prepare a restaurant-quality, three-course meal for a panel of food critics, who evaluate the dishes based on taste, presentation, and overall improvement.

== Judges ==
Antonia Lofaso and Jeff Mauro are the leaders for Celebrity Edition: Heroes vs. Villains, which consists of celebrities and reality TV stars, and dividing them into teams of Heroes and Villains. This is the first season to not feature Anne Burrell. The season premiered on January 5, 2025.

== Recruits ==
Contestant	Age	Occupation	Team	Status
Corinne Olympios	32	The Bachelor star	Villains	Winner on February 2, 2025
Adam Rippon	35	Retired Olympic figure skater	Heroes	Runner-up on February 2, 2025
Frankie Grande	42	Big Brother star	Heroes	Eliminated on February 2, 2025
Wes Bergmann	40	The Challenge star	Villains	Eliminated on February 2, 2025
Tiffany Pollard	43	Flavor of Love and Celebrity Big Brother UK star	Villains	Eliminated on February 2, 2025
Bartise Bowden	29	Love Is Blind star	Villains	Eliminated on January 26, 2025
Trinity the Tuck	39	RuPaul's Drag Race star	Heroes	Eliminated on January 26, 2025
Rachel Reilly	40	Big Brother and The Amazing Race star	Villains	Eliminated on January 26, 2025
Sebastian Bach	56	Former lead singer of Skid Row	Heroes	Eliminated on January 19, 2025
Cheryl Burke	40	Dancing with the Stars dancer	Heroes	Eliminated on January 12, 2025

=== Contestant progress ===
Team Antonia/Villains
Team Jeff/Heroes

Rank	Contestant	Episode							
Rank	Contestant	1	2	3	4	5	6	7	
1	Corinne	WIN	IN	IN	IN	IN	WIN	WIN	WINNER
2	Adam	IN	WIN	IN	WIN	IN	WIN	WIN	RUNNER-UP
3	Frankie	WIN	IN	IN	BTM	BTM	BTM	OUT	
4	Wes	IN	WIN	BTM	WIN	BTM	IN	OUT	
5	Tiffany	IN	BTM	IN	IN	WIN	OUT		
6	Bartise	IN	IN	WIN	IN	OUT			
7	Trinity	IN	IN	WIN	IN	OUT			
8	Rachel	BTM	IN	IN	OUT				
9	Sebastian	IN	IN	OUT					
10	Cheryl	BTM	OUT						

Key
(WINNER) This contestant won the competition and was crowned "Best of the Worst".
(RUNNER-UP) The contestant was the runner-up in the finals of the competition.
(WIN) The contestant did the best on their team in the week's Main Dish Challenge and was considered the winner.
(BTM) The contestant was selected as one of the bottom entries in the Main Dish challenge but was not eliminated.
(OUT) The contestant lost that week's Main Dish challenge and was out of the competition.

== Episodes ==
No. overall	No. in season	Title	Original release date
206	1	"Celeb Heroes vs Villains: Real Worst Cooks of Boot Camp"	January 5, 2025
207	2	"Culinary Avengers"	January 12, 2025
208	3	"Celeb Heroes vs Villains: The Great Boot Camp Cook-Off"	January 19, 2025
209	4	"Celeb Heroes vs Villains: Taste Your Tale"	January 26, 2025
210	5	"Celeb Heroes vs Villains: Games of Scones"	January 26, 2025
211	6	"Celeb Heroes vs Villains: Reality Stars on Mars"	February 2, 2025
212	7	"Celeb Heroes vs Villains: America's New Top Cook"	February 2, 2025
