= Worst Cooks in America season 24 =

Worst Cooks in America
- Season 24
- Judges: Anne Burrell; Jeff Mauro
- No. of contestants: 9
- Winner: Tracey Gold
- Winning mentor: Anne Burrell
- Runner-up: Jodie Sweetin
- No. of episodes: 7

Release
- Original network: Food Network
- Original release: April 24 – May 29, 2022

Season chronology
- ← Previous; Season 23 Next → Season 25

Worst Cooks in America 24, also known as That's So '90s, is the twenty-fourth season of the American competitive reality television series Worst Cooks in America. This is the seventh iteration of the celebrity editions. It premiered on Food Network on April 24, 2022, and concluded on May 29, 2022. Tracey Gold was the winner of this season, with Jodie Sweetin as the runner-up.

== Format ==
Worst Cooks in America (Celebrity Edition) is an American reality television series in which celebrities (referred to as "recruits") with poor cooking skills undergo a culinary boot camp for the chance to win a $50,000 prize to donate to the charity of their choice. The recruits are trained on the various basic cooking techniques including baking, knife skills, temperature, seasoning and preparation. Each episode features two core challenges: the Skills Drill, which tests their grasp of basic techniques demonstrated by the chef mentors, and the Main Dish Challenge, where they must apply those skills to recreate or invent a more complex dish under specific guidelines. The weakest performer is eliminated at the end of each episode. The final two contestants prepare a restaurant-quality, three-course meal for a panel of food critics, who evaluate the dishes based on taste, presentation, and overall improvement.

== Judges ==
Jeff Mauro joins Anne Burrell to host the seventh run of the Celebrity Edition That's So '90s. The season premiered on April 24, 2022.

== Recruits ==
Contestant	Age	Occupation	Team	Status
Tracey Gold	52	Growing Pains star	Anne	Winner on May 29, 2022
Jodie Sweetin	40	Full House and Fuller House star	Jeff	Runner-up on May 29, 2022
Elisa Donovan	51	Clueless star	Anne	Finalist on May 29, 2022
Matthew Lawrence	42	Mrs. Doubtfire star	Jeff	Finalist on May 29, 2022
Mark Long	50	Road Rules star	Anne	Eliminated on May 22, 2022
Jennie Kwan	48	California Dreams star	Jeff	Eliminated on May 15, 2022
Lori Beth Denberg	46	All That star	Jeff	Eliminated on May 15, 2022
Nicholle Tom	43	The Nanny star	Anne	Eliminated on May 8, 2022
Curtis Williams	34	The Parent 'Hood star	Jeff	Eliminated on May 1, 2022

== Elimination chart ==
Team Anne
Team Jeff

Rank	Contestant	Episode						
Rank	Contestant	1	2	3	4	5	6	7
1	Tracey	IN	IN	IN	IMM	WIN	IN	WINNER
2	Jodie	IN	IN	IN	WIN	IN	WIN	RUNNER-UP
3	Elisa	BTM	WIN	IN	WIN	BTM	WIN	FINALIST
4	Matthew	IN	IN	WIN	IN	WIN	BTM	FINALIST
5	Mark	WIN	IN	WIN	BTM	IN	OUT	
6	Jennie	WIN	WIN	BTM	IN	OUT		
7	Lori Beth	IN	IN	IN	OUT			
8	Nicholle	IN	BTM	OUT				
9	Curtis	BTM	OUT					

Key
(WINNER) This contestant won the competition and was crowned "Best of the Worst".
(RUNNER-UP) The contestant was the runner-up in the finals of the competition.
(FINALIST) The contestant was a finalist in the finals of the competition.
(IMM) The contestant won immunity and was safe from elimination in the week's Main Dish Challenge.
(WIN) The contestant did the best on their team in the week's Main Dish Challenge and was considered the winner.
(BTM) The contestant was selected as one of the bottom entries in the Main Dish challenge but was not eliminated.
(OUT) The contestant lost that week's Main Dish challenge and was out of the competition.

== Episodes ==
No. overall	No. in season	Title	Original release date
175	1	"That's so '90s: The Fresh Chefs of Boot Camp"	April 24, 2022
176	2	"That's so '90s: Clueless in the Kitchen"	May 1, 2022
177	3	"That's so '90s: Cross-Country Cooking"	May 8, 2022
178	4	"That's so '90s: Going Coco-Nuts"	May 15, 2022
179	5	"That's so '90s: Baking Me Crazy"	May 15, 2022
180	6	"That's so '90s: Saved by the Dough"	May 22, 2022
181	7	"That's so '90s: From Worst to First"	May 29, 2022
