= Worst Cooks in America season 9 =

Worst Cooks in America
- Season 9
- Judges: Anne Burrell; Rachael Ray
- No. of contestants: 9
- Winner: Loni Love
- Winning mentor: Rachael Ray
- Runner-up: Nicole Sullivan
- No. of episodes: 8

Release
- Original network: Food Network
- Original release: September 14 – November 2, 2016

Season chronology
- ← Previous; Season 8 Next → Season 10

Worst Cooks in America 9, also known as Celebrity Edition 2, is the ninth season of the American competitive reality television series Worst Cooks in America. This is the second iteration of the celebrity editions. It premiered on Food Network on September 14, 2016 and concluded on November 2, 2016. Loni Love was the winner of this season, with Nicole Sullivan as the runner-up.

== Format ==
Worst Cooks in America (Celebrity Edition) is an American reality television series in which celebrities (referred to as "recruits") with poor cooking skills undergo a culinary boot camp for the chance to win a $50,000 prize to donate to the charity of their choice. The recruits are trained on the various basic cooking techniques including baking, knife skills, temperature, seasoning and preparation. Each episode features two core challenges: the Skills Drill, which tests their grasp of basic techniques demonstrated by the chef mentors, and the Main Dish Challenge, where they must apply those skills to recreate or invent a more complex dish under specific guidelines. The weakest performer is eliminated at the end of each episode. The final two contestants prepare a restaurant-quality, three-course meal for a panel of food critics, who evaluate the dishes based on taste, presentation, and overall improvement.

== Judges ==
Rachael Ray returns with Anne Burrell to host season 2 of the Celebrity Edition. The winner earns a $50,000 donation for their chosen charity. The season premiered on September 14, 2016, to 1,185,000 viewers.

== Recruits ==
Contestant	Age	Occupation	Team	Status
Loni Love	44	The Real Co-Host & Comedian	Rachael	Winner on November 2, 2016
Nicole Sullivan	46	Former MadTV Star, comedian, & Actress	Anne	Runner-up on November 2, 2016
John Henson	49	Former Talk Soup & Wipeout host	Rachael	Eliminated on October 26, 2016
Mike "The Situation" Sorrentino	34	Reality Television Personality	Anne	Eliminated on October 26, 2016
Matt Dallas	33	Television Actor & YouTube Personality	Anne	Eliminated on October 19, 2016
Mindy Cohn	50	The Facts of Life & Scooby-Doo Actress	Rachael	Eliminated on October 12, 2016
Tommy Davidson	52	Comedian & Actor	Anne	Eliminated on September 28, 2016
Barbara Eden	85	Film & Television Actress (I Dream of Jeannie & Harper Valley P.T.A.)	Rachael	Eliminated on September 21, 2016
Kenya Moore	45	Miss USA 1993 & The Real Housewives of Atlanta Star	-	Eliminated on September 14, 2016

== Episodes ==
No. overall	No. in season	Title	Original release date
57	1	"Celebrity: Celebrity Dish-asters"	September 14, 2016
58	2	"Celebrity: Hawaiian Pig and a Poke"	September 21, 2016
59	3	"Celebrity: Oktoberfest Feast"	September 28, 2016
60	4	"Celebrity: BOOOOT Camp!"	October 5, 2016
61	5	"Celebrity: Celebrity Cheat Meals"	October 12, 2016
62	6	"Celebrity: Hollywood Goes Bollywood"	October 19, 2016
63	7	"Celebrity: Live and Let Dough"	October 26, 2016
64	8	"Celebrity: The Final Showdown"	November 2, 2016
