= Worst Cooks in America season 25 =

Worst Cooks in America
- Season 25
- Judges: Anne Burrell; Darnell Ferguson
- No. of contestants: 12
- Winner: Nick Trawick
- Winning mentor: Anne Burrell
- Runner-up: Michael Judson Berry
- No. of episodes: 8

Release
- Original network: Food Network
- Original release: January 1 – February 5, 2023

Season chronology
- ← Previous; Season 24 Next → Season 26

Worst Cooks in America 25, also known as Viral Sensations, is the twenty-fifth season of the American competitive reality television series Worst Cooks in America. It premiered on Food Network on January 1, 2023 and concluded on February 5, 2023. Nick Trawick was the winner of this season, with Michael Judson Berry as the runner-up.

== Format ==
Worst Cooks in America is an American reality television series in which contestants (referred to as "recruits") with poor cooking skills undergo a culinary boot camp for the chance to win $25,000 and a Food Network cooking set. The recruits are trained on the various basic cooking techniques including baking, knife skills, temperature, seasoning and preparation. Each episode features two core challenges: the Skills Drill, which tests their grasp of basic techniques demonstrated by the chef mentors, and the Main Dish Challenge, where they must apply those skills to recreate or invent a more complex dish under specific guidelines. The weakest performer is eliminated at the end of each episode. The final two contestants prepare a restaurant-quality, three-course meal for a panel of food critics, who evaluate the dishes based on taste, presentation, and overall improvement.

During this season, a new gimmick to the show has been added. It is known as a Chef Like, which is a pin awarded to the winner of the Skill Drill Challenge on both teams and the Main Dish Challenge on both teams. The respective mentor of the team decides the winner. The recruit who accumulates the most will have a game-changing advantage. In episode 5, the recruit with the most Chef Likes on each team was able to choose one team member to switch to the opposite team.

== Judges ==
Darnell Ferguson joins Anne Burrell to host the first run of Viral Sensations. The season premiered on January 1, 2023.

== Recruits ==
Contestant	Hometown	Occupation	Team	Status
Nick Trawick	Los Angeles, California	Social media influencer	Anne	Winner on February 5, 2023
Michael Judson Berry	Jersey City, New Jersey	Actor	Darnell	Runner-up on February 5, 2023
Paris Nicholson	Los Angeles, California	Social media influencer	Anne	Finalist on February 5, 2023
NaJe' Elmore	Texarkana, Texas	Social media influencer	Darnell	Finalist on February 5, 2023
David Chen	Fort Lauderdale, Florida	Flight attendant	Darnell	Eliminated on January 29, 2023
Tessica Brown	Violet, Louisiana	Stay at home mom	Anne	Eliminated on January 29, 2023
Eliza Petersen	West Jordan, Utah	Amateur paleontologist	Darnell	Eliminated on January 29, 2023
Rich Aronovitch	New York City	Professional comedian	Anne	Eliminated on January 29, 2023
Mitchell Tyler Ralston	Huntington Beach, California	Ghost Hunter	Anne	Eliminated on January 22, 2023
Sabrina Rios	Los Angeles, California	Social media influencer	Darnell	Eliminated on January 22, 2023
Tina Kim	Los Angeles, California	Social media influencer	Darnell	Eliminated on January 15, 2023
Adam Kreutinger	Buffalo, New York	Puppeteer	Anne	Eliminated on January 8, 2023

== Elimination Chart ==
Team Anne
Team Darnell

*Initially a member of the other team

Rank	Contestant	Episode							
Rank	Contestant	1	2	3	4	5	6	7	8
1	Nick	IN	IN	IN	IN	BTM	BTM	BTM	WINNER
2	Michael	IN	IN	IN	WIN	WIN	BTM	BTM	RUNNER-UP
3	Paris	BTM	IN	IN	WIN	WIN	IN	WIN	FINALIST
4	NaJe'	IN	WIN	WIN	BTM	IN	WIN	WIN	FINALIST
5	David	BTM	IN	IN	IN	BTM	IN	OUT	
6	Tessica	IN	BTM	IN	BTM	BTM	WIN	OUT	
7	Eliza*	IN	WIN	WIN	IN	SWAP	OUT		
8	Rich*	IN	IN	IN	IN	SWAP	OUT		
9	Mitchell	IN	IN	IN	OUT				
10	Sabrina	IN	IN	BTM	OUT				
11	Tina	IN	IN	OUT					
12	Adam	IN	OUT						

Key
(WINNER) This contestant won the competition and was crowned "Best of the Worst".
(RUNNER-UP) The contestant was the runner-up in the finals of the competition.
(FINALIST) The contestant was a finalist in the finals of the competition.
(WIN) The contestant did the best on their team in the week's Main Dish Challenge and was considered the winner.
(BTM) The contestant was selected as one of the bottom entries in the Main Dish challenge but was not eliminated.
(SWAP) The contestant get switched by a mentor to the other team.
(OUT) The contestant lost that week's Main Dish challenge and was out of the competition.

== Episodes ==
No. overall	No. in season	Title	Original release date
182	1	"Viral Sensations: Culinary Clickbait"	January 1, 2023
184	2	"Viral Sensations: America's Next Culinary Influencer"	January 8, 2023
185	3	"Viral Sensations: My Big Fat Greek Kitchen"	January 15, 2023
186	4	"Viral Sensations: That's So Decadent"	January 22, 2023
187	5	"Viral Sensations: Surviving Worst Cooks"	January 22, 2023
188	6	"Viral Sensations: Glitch in the Culinary Matrix"	January 29, 2023
189	7	"Viral Sensations: Robo-Roast"	January 29, 2023
190	8	"Viral Sensations: Verified Chefs"	February 5, 2023
