= Worst Cooks in America season 30 =

Worst Cooks in America
- Season 30
- Judges: Tiffany Derry; Jeff Mauro
- No. of contestants: 10
- Winner: Reza Farahan
- Winning mentor: Tiffany Derry
- Runner-up: Beverley Mitchell
- No. of episodes: 7

Release
- Original network: Food Network
- Original release: January 4 – February 1, 2026

Season chronology
- ← Previous; Season 29

Worst Cooks in America 30, also known as Worst Cooks: Reality Check, is the thirtieth season of the American competitive reality television series Worst Cooks in America. The season features celebrities and reality TV stars. It premiered on Food Network on January 4, 2026 and concluded on February 1, 2026. Reza Farahan was the winner of this season, with Beverley Mitchell as the runner-up.

== Format ==
Worst Cooks in America is an American reality television series in which celebrities (referred to as "recruits") with poor cooking skills undergo a culinary boot camp for the chance to win a $50,000 prize to donate to the charity of their choice. The recruits are trained on the various basic cooking techniques including baking, knife skills, temperature, seasoning and preparation. Each episode features two core challenges: the Skills Drill, which tests their grasp of basic techniques demonstrated by the chef mentors, and the Main Dish Challenge, where they must apply those skills to recreate or invent a more complex dish under specific guidelines. The weakest performer is eliminated at the end of each episode. The final two contestants prepare a restaurant-quality, three-course meal for a panel of food critics, who evaluate the dishes based on taste, presentation, and overall improvement.

== Judges ==
Tiffany Derry and Jeff Mauro are the leaders for Worst Cooks: Reality Check, which consists of celebrities and reality TV stars. This is the first season to be filmed following the suicide of long term judge Anne Burrell, while it is also the second season not to feature her (the first one was Season 28, also hosted by Mauro). The season premiered on January 4, 2026.

== Recruits ==
Contestant	Age	Occupation	Team	Status
Reza Farahan	52	Shahs of Sunset star	Tiffany	Winner on February 1, 2026
Beverley Mitchell	44	Actress	Jeff	Runner-up on February 1, 2026
CT Tamburello	45	The Challenge star	Jeff	Eliminated on February 1, 2026
Manila Luzon	44	RuPaul's Drag Race star	Tiffany	Eliminated on February 1, 2026
Val Chmerkovskiy	39	Dancing with the Stars dancer	Tiffany	Eliminated on February 1, 2026
Downtown Julie Brown	62	Former MTV VJ	Jeff	Eliminated on January 25, 2026
Ryan Lochte	41	Former Olympic swimmer	Jeff	Withdrew (Note: Lochte chose to leave due to health reasons.) on January 25, 2026
Amara La Negra	35	Love & Hip Hop: Miami star	Tiffany	Eliminated on January 18, 2026
Lisa Barlow	50	The Real Housewives of Salt Lake City star	Jeff	Eliminated on January 11, 2026
Romeo Miller	36	Rapper and singer	Tiffany	Eliminated on January 4, 2026

== Elimination Chart ==
Team Tiffany
Team Jeff

Rank	Contestant	Episode						
Rank	Contestant	1	2	3	4	5	6	7
1	Reza	WIN	IN	WIN	WIN	BTM	WIN	WINNER
2	Beverley	WIN	IN	IN	WIN	IN	WIN	RUNNER UP
3/4	CT	IN	IN	BTM	IN	WIN	IN	OUT
3/4	Manila	IN	IN	IN	IN	IN	BTM	OUT
5	Val	IN	WIN	IN	BTM	WIN	OUT	
6	Julie	IN	IN	IN	BTM	OUT		
7	Ryan	BTM	WIN	WIN	WDR			
8	Amara	IN	BTM	OUT				
9	Lisa	IN	OUT					
10	Romeo	OUT						

Key
(WINNER) This contestant won the competition and was crowned "Best of the Worst".
(RUNNER-UP) The contestant was the runner-up in the finals of the competition.
(WIN) The contestant did the best on their team in the week's Main Dish Challenge and was considered the winner.
(BTM) The contestant was selected as one of the bottom entries in the Main Dish challenge but was not eliminated.
(OUT) The contestant lost that week's Main Dish challenge and was out of the competition.
(WDR) The contestant withdrew from the competition due to illness.

== Episodes ==
No. overall	No. in season	Title	Original release date
220	1	"Reality Check: Lights, Camera, Boot Camp"	January 4, 2026
221	2	"Reality Check: Hollywood's Next Culinary Star"	January 11, 2025
222	3	"Reality Check: The Worst Lotus"	January 18, 2026
223	4	"Reality Check: Culinary Outlaws"	January 25, 2026
224	5	"Reality Check: Glitz, Glam and Gourmet"	January 25, 2026
225	6	"Reality Check: Agents of Flavor"	February 1, 2026
226	7	"Reality Check: Bite Club"	February 1, 2026
