= Worst Cooks in America season 8 =

Worst Cooks in America
- Season 8
- Judges: Anne Burrell; Tyler Florence
- No. of contestants: 14
- Winner: Nick Slater
- Winning mentor: Anne Burrell
- Runner-up: Lawrence Crawford
- No. of episodes: 7

Release
- Original network: Food Network
- Original release: January 3 – February 14, 2016

Season chronology
- ← Previous; Season 7 Next → Season 9

Worst Cooks in America 8, is the eighth season of the American competitive reality television series Worst Cooks in America. It premiered on Food Network on January 3, 2016 and concluded on February 14, 2016. Nick Slater was the winner of this season, with Lawrence Crawford as the runner-up.

== Format ==
Worst Cooks in America is an American reality television series in which contestants (referred to as "recruits") with poor cooking skills undergo a culinary boot camp for the chance to win $25,000 and a Food Network cooking set. The recruits are trained on the various basic cooking techniques including baking, knife skills, temperature, seasoning and preparation. Each episode features two core challenges: the Skills Drill, which tests their grasp of basic techniques demonstrated by the chef mentors, and the Main Dish Challenge, where they must apply those skills to recreate or invent a more complex dish under specific guidelines. The weakest performer is eliminated at the end of each episode. The final two contestants prepare a restaurant-quality, three-course meal for a panel of food critics, who evaluate the dishes based on taste, presentation, and overall improvement.

== Judges ==
Tyler Florence returns Anne Burrell to host season 8.

== Recruits ==
Contestant	Age	Hometown	Occupation	Team	Status
Nick Slater	24	Rancho Cucamonga, California	Construction Worker	Anne	Winner on February 14, 2016
Lawrence Crawford	26	Deptford Township, New Jersey	Army Combat Medic	Tyler	Runner-up on February 14, 2016
Ginny Meerman	50	Millersville, Maryland	Project Supervisor	Tyler	Eliminated on February 7, 2016
Taylor Hooper	24	Boston, Massachusetts	Marine Veteran	Anne	Eliminated on February 7, 2016
Holgie Forrester	66	Twentynine Palms, California	Retired/Actress	Tyler	Eliminated on January 31, 2016
Chanda Havard	36	Chicago, Illinois	Real Estate Agent	Anne	Eliminated on January 31, 2016
Rachel Thomas	27	Tampa, Florida	Stay-at-Home Wife	Tyler	Eliminated on January 24, 2016
Donna Koen	60	Newburyport, Massachusetts	Lunch Lady & Hairdresser	Anne	Eliminated on January 24, 2016
Ernie Adkins	44	Mardela Springs, Maryland	Truck driver	Tyler	Eliminated on January 17, 2016
Glenda Galeano	40	Miami, Florida	Event Coordinator/Actress	Anne	Eliminated on January 17, 2016
Cindy Nguyen	28	Las Vegas, Nevada	Bartender	Tyler	Eliminated on January 10, 2016
Ty Snow	39	Pasadena, California	Special Education Teacher	Anne	Eliminated on January 10, 2016
David Fouts	42	Wales, Wisconsin	Senior Project Manager	Anne	Eliminated on January 3, 2016
Jeni Erdman	51	Dousman, Wisconsin	Group Tour Coordinator	Tyler	Eliminated on January 3, 2016

== Elimination Chart ==
Team Anne
Team Tyler

Rank	Contestant	Episode										
Rank	Contestant	1	2		3		4		5		6	7
1	Nick	WIN	WIN	IN	IN	IN	IN	IN	IN	TIE	WIN	WINNER
2	Lawrence	IN	IN	IN	IN	IN	IN	WIN	IN	BTM	WIN	RUNNER-UP
3	Ginny	WIN	BTM	WIN	IN	BTM	TIE	IN	WIN	WIN	OUT	
4	Taylor	IN	IN	IN	IN	BTM	IN	WIN	WIN	TIE	OUT	
5	Holgie	IN	WIN	IN	IN	IN	TIE	BTM	IN	OUT		
6	Chanda	BTM	IN	IN	BTM	WIN	WIN	BTM	IN	OUT		
7	Rachel	BTM	IN	BTM	WIN	WIN	BTM	OUT				
8	Donna	IN	BTM	WIN	IN	IN	BTM	OUT				
9	Ernie	IN	BTM	IN	IN	OUT						
10	Glenda	IN	BTM	BTM	BTM	OUT						
11	Cindy	IN	IN	OUT								
12	Ty	IN	IN	OUT								
13	David	OUT										
14	Jeni	OUT										

Key
(WINNER) This contestant won the competition and was crowned "Best of the Worst".
(RUNNER-UP) The contestant was the runner-up in the finals of the competition.
(WIN) The contestant did the best on their team in the week's Main Dish challenge or Skill Drill and was considered the winner.
(TIE) The contestant tied with another contestant as the best on their team in the week's Main Dish challenge or Skill Drill.
(BTM) The contestant was selected as one of the bottom entries in the Main Dish challenge, but was not eliminated.
(OUT) The contestant lost that week's Main Dish challenge and was out of the competition.

== Episodes ==
No. overall	No. in season	Title	Original release date
50	1	"Fear the Worst"	January 3, 2016
51	2	"Getting Stuffed"	January 10, 2016
52	3	"50 Shades of Flavor"	January 17, 2016
53	4	"Taking It to the Streets"	January 24, 2016
54	5	"The Cod Squad"	January 31, 2016
55	6	"Blast from the Past"	February 7, 2016
56	7	"Final Food Fight 8"	February 14, 2016
