= Worst Cooks in America season 13 =

Worst Cooks in America
- Season 13
- Judges: Anne Burrell; Tyler Florence
- No. of contestants: 7
- Winner: La Toya Jackson
- Winning mentor: Tyler Florence
- Runner-up: Ian Ziering
- No. of episodes: 6

Release
- Original network: Food Network
- Original release: April 15 – May 20, 2018

Season chronology
- ← Previous; Season 12 Next → Season 14

Worst Cooks in America 13, also known as Celebrity Edition 4, is the thirteenth season of the American competitive reality television series Worst Cooks in America. This is the fourth iteration of the celebrity editions. It premiered on Food Network on April 15, 2018 and concluded on May 20, 2018. La Toya Jackson was the winner of this season, with Ian Ziering as the runner-up.

== Format ==
Worst Cooks in America (Celebrity Edition) is an American reality television series in which celebrities (referred to as "recruits") with poor cooking skills undergo a culinary boot camp for the chance to win a $50,000 prize to donate to the charity of their choice. The recruits are trained on the various basic cooking techniques including baking, knife skills, temperature, seasoning and preparation. Each episode features two core challenges: the Skills Drill, which tests their grasp of basic techniques demonstrated by the chef mentors, and the Main Dish Challenge, where they must apply those skills to recreate or invent a more complex dish under specific guidelines. The weakest performer is eliminated at the end of each episode. The final two contestants prepare a restaurant-quality, three-course meal for a panel of food critics, who evaluate the dishes based on taste, presentation, and overall improvement.

== Judges ==
Tyler Florence returns with Anne Burrell to host season 4 of the Celebrity Edition. This is the first Celebrity Edition to not feature Rachael Ray as a judge. The season premiered on April 15, 2018.

== Recruits ==
Contestant	Age	Occupation	Team	Status
La Toya Jackson	61	Singer-songwriter	Tyler	Winner on May 20, 2018
Ian Ziering	53	Beverly Hills, 90210 star	Anne	Runner-up on May 20, 2018
Oscar Nunez	59	The Office Star	Tyler	Eliminated on May 13, 2018
Catherine Bach	64	The Dukes of Hazzard Star	Anne	Eliminated on May 13, 2018
Maria Bamford	48	Comedian	Tyler	Eliminated on May 6, 2018
Nolan Gould	19	Modern Family Star	Anne	Eliminated on April 29, 2018
Bronson Pinchot	58	Perfect Strangers star	Anne	Eliminated on April 22, 2018

== Elimination Chart ==
Team Anne
Team Tyler

Rank	Contestant	Episode					
Rank	Contestant	1	2	3	4	5	6
1	La Toya	IN	WIN	WIN	WIN	WIN	WINNER
2	Ian	IN	IN	WIN	WIN	WIN	RUNNER-UP
3	Oscar	BTM	BTM	BTM	IN	OUT	
4	Catherine	IN	WIN	IN	BTM	OUT	
5	Maria	IN	IN	IN	OUT		
6	Nolan	BTM	IN	OUT			
7	Bronson	IN	OUT				

Key
(WINNER) This contestant won the competition and was crowned "Best of the Worst".
(RUNNER-UP) The contestant was the runner-up in the finals of the competition.
(WIN) The contestant did the best on their team in the week's Main Dish challenge or Skill Drill and was considered the winner.
(BTM) The contestant was selected as one of the bottom entries in the Main Dish challenge but was not eliminated.
(OUT) The contestant lost that week's Main Dish challenge and was out of the competition.

== Episodes ==
No. overall	No. in season	Title	Original release date
93	1	"Celebrity: Hit Me With Your Best Dish"	April 15, 2018
94	2	"Celebrity: Rolling in the Deep"	April 22, 2018
95	3	"Celebrity: Mother Dough"	April 29, 2018
96	4	"Celebrity: Nutritious and Delicious"	May 6, 2018
97	5	"Celebrity: A La Cuisine!"	May 13, 2018
98	6	"Celebrity: It's All for the Fans"	May 20, 2018
