= Worst Cooks in America season 26 =

Worst Cooks in America
- Season 26
- Judges: Anne Burrell; Jeff Mauro
- No. of contestants: 16
- Winner: Jessica Singer
- Winning mentor: Jeff Mauro
- Runner-up: Samantha "Sami" White
- No. of episodes: 8

Release
- Original network: Food Network
- Original release: August 6 – September 10, 2023

Season chronology
- ← Previous; Season 25 Next → Season 27

Worst Cooks in America 26, also known as Love at First Bite, is the twenty-sixth season of the American competitive reality television series Worst Cooks in America. It premiered on Food Network on August 6, 2023 and concluded on September 10, 2023. Jessica Singer was the winner of this season, with Samantha "Sami" White as the runner-up.

== Format ==
Worst Cooks in America is an American reality television series in which contestants (referred to as "recruits") with poor cooking skills undergo a culinary boot camp for the chance to win $25,000 and a Food Network cooking set. The recruits are trained on the various basic cooking techniques including baking, knife skills, temperature, seasoning and preparation. Each episode features two core challenges: the Skills Drill, which tests their grasp of basic techniques demonstrated by the chef mentors, and the Main Dish Challenge, where they must apply those skills to recreate or invent a more complex dish under specific guidelines. The weakest performer is eliminated at the end of each episode. The final two contestants prepare a restaurant-quality, three-course meal for a panel of food critics, who evaluate the dishes based on taste, presentation, and overall improvement.

== Judges ==
Jeff Mauro joins Anne Burrell to host Love at First Bite. The season premiered on August 6, 2023.

== Recruits ==
Contestant	Hometown	Occupation	Team	Status
Jessica Singer	Los Angeles, California	Comedian/Pet Sitter	Jeff	Winner on September 10, 2023
Samantha "Sami" White	Chicago, Illinois	Drag King	Anne	Runner-up on September 10, 2023
Louisa "Lou" Tocquie	Rochester, New York	Home Health Aide	Anne	Finalist on September 10, 2023
Sterling Quinn	New York City	Fashion Designer/Content Creator	Jeff	Finalist on September 10, 2023
Etherio Noon	Chicago, Illinois	Model	Anne	Eliminated on September 10, 2023
Allegra Melton	Jonesboro, Arkansas	Personal Trainer	Jeff	Eliminated on September 10, 2023
Zach Russell	New York City	Business Development Director	Jeff	Eliminated on September 3, 2023
James Bates	Hammond, Louisiana	Content Creator	Anne	Eliminated on September 3, 2023
Kermit Moss Jr.	Costa Mesa, California	Music Producer	Jeff	Eliminated on August 27, 2023
Terri Arcelia	Atlanta, Georgia	Bartender	Anne	Eliminated on August 27, 2023
Toneata Morgan	Los Angeles, California	Actress/Model	Jeff	Eliminated on August 27, 2023
Charles Osborne	New York City	Actor/Comedian/Writer	Anne	Withdrew on August 27, 2023
Denz Mooney	Long Island, New York	Content Creator	Anne	Eliminated on August 20, 2023
Michael Kazakov	Staten Island, New York	Demolition Man	Jeff	Withdrew on August 20, 2023
Matthew Militello	Los Angeles, California	Makeup Artist	Jeff	Eliminated on August 12, 2023
Amy Solomon	Las Vegas, Nevada	Professional Organizer	Anne	Eliminated on August 12, 2023

=== Couples ===
This season features a cast of single recruits eager to learn some cooking skills to impress future dates. As a twist, recruits were selected in pairs to join the Red or Blue Team. Pairs will compete together in all Skill Drills and share a work station for all cooks.

Original Couples (Note: The winner of each team's Skill Drill cook receives the power to "recouple" by staying with their current partner or choosing a different one as his new partner.)	Team
Allegra & Michael (Note: In Episode 2, Michael recoupled with Sterling.)	Blue
Amy & Etherio (Note: In Episode 4, Etherio chose to be in the "Singles Zone".)	Red
Jessica & Kermit (Note: In Episode 4, Kermit recoupled with Toneata, thus leaving Jessica to pair up with Zach.)	Blue
Lou & Denz	Red
Sami & James	Red
Sterling & Matthew (Note: In Episode 3, Sterling was automatically paired with Allegra since Michael withdrew from the competition.)	Blue
Terri & Charles (Note: In Episode 3, Terri recoupled with Etherio, thus leaving Charles in the "Singles Zone".)	Red
Toneata & Zach	Blue

== Elimination Chart ==
Team Anne
Team Jeff

Rank	Contestant	Episode							
Rank	Contestant	1	2	3	4	5	6	7	8
1	Jessica	BTM	IN	IN	IN	IN	WIN	BTM	WINNER
2	Sami	IN	IN	BTM	WIN	WIN	IN	WIN	RUNNER-UP
3	Lou	BTM	IN	WIN	IN	IN	WIN	BTM	FINALIST
4	Sterling	IN	IN	IN	WIN	IN	BTM	WIN	FINALIST
5	Etherio	IN	IN	IN	IN	IN	BTM	OUT	
6	Allegra	IN	IN	IN	IN	WIN	IN	OUT	
7	Zach	IN	IN	WIN	IN	BTM	OUT		
8	James	IN	IN	IN	IN	BTM	OUT		
9	Kermit	BTM	BTM	IN	BTM	OUT			
10	Terri	IN	IN	IN	IN	OUT			
11	Toneata	IN	IN	IN	OUT				
12	Charles	IN	WIN	IN	WDR				
13	Denz	BTM	BTM	OUT					
14	Michael	IN	WIN	WDR					
15	Matthew	IN	OUT						
16	Amy	IN	OUT						

Key
(WINNER) This contestant won the competition and was crowned "Best of the Worst".
(RUNNER-UP) The contestant was the runner-up in the finals of the competition.
(FINALIST) The contestant was a finalist in the finals of the competition.
(WIN) The contestant did the best on their team in the week's Main Dish Challenge and was considered the winner.
(BTM) The contestant was selected as one of the bottom entries in the Main Dish challenge but was not eliminated.
(OUT) The contestant lost that week's Main Dish challenge and was out of the competition.
(WDR) The contestant withdrew from the competition due to illness.

== Episodes ==
No. overall	No. in season	Title	Original release date
191	1	"Love at First Bite: Fiery First Date"	August 6, 2023
192	2	"Love at First Bite: That's Amore"	August 12, 2023
193	3	"Love at First Bite: Double Dish of Love"	August 20, 2023
194	4	"Love at First Bite: Flavor of Love"	August 27, 2023
195	5	"Love at First Bite: Some Like It Hot"	August 27, 2023
196	6	"Love at First Bite: If the Choux Fits"	September 3, 2023
197	7	"Love at First Bite: What Happens in Boot Camp"	September 10, 2023
198	8	"Love at First Bite: All Is Fair in Love and Cooking"	September 10, 2023
