= Worst Cooks in America season 16 =

Worst Cooks in America
- Season 16
- Judges: Anne Burrell; Tyler Florence
- No. of contestants: 8
- Winner: Tonya Harding
- Winning mentor: Anne Burrell
- Runner-up: Alec Mapa
- No. of episodes: 7

Release
- Original network: Food Network
- Original release: April 21 – June 2, 2019

Season chronology
- ← Previous; Season 15 Next → Season 17

Worst Cooks in America 16, also known as Celebrity Edition 5, is the sixteenth season of the American competitive reality television series Worst Cooks in America. This is the fifth iteration of the celebrity editions. It premiered on Food Network on April 21, 2019 and concluded on June 2, 2019. Tonya Harding was the winner of this season, with Alec Mapa as the runner-up.

== Format ==
Worst Cooks in America (Celebrity Edition) is an American reality television series in which celebrities (referred to as "recruits") with poor cooking skills undergo a culinary boot camp for the chance to win a $50,000 prize to donate to the charity of their choice. The recruits are trained on the various basic cooking techniques including baking, knife skills, temperature, seasoning and preparation. Each episode features two core challenges: the Skills Drill, which tests their grasp of basic techniques demonstrated by the chef mentors, and the Main Dish Challenge, where they must apply those skills to recreate or invent a more complex dish under specific guidelines. The weakest performer is eliminated at the end of each episode. The final two contestants prepare a restaurant-quality, three-course meal for a panel of food critics, who evaluate the dishes based on taste, presentation, and overall improvement.

== Judges ==
Tyler Florence returns with Anne Burrell to host the fifth run of the Celebrity Edition. The season premiered on April 21, 2019.

== Recruits ==
Contestant	Age	Occupation	Team	Status
Tonya Harding	48	Retired Figure Skater/Reality TV Personality	Anne	Winner on June 2, 2019
Alec Mapa	53	Actor/Comedian/Writer	Tyler	Runner-up on June 2, 2019
Jim J. Bullock	64	Actor/Comedian	Anne	Eliminated on May 26, 2019
Kym Whitley	57	Comedian/Actress	Tyler	Eliminated on May 26, 2019
Jonathan Lipnicki	28	Actor/Producer	Anne	Eliminated on May 12, 2019
Morgan Fairchild	69	Actress	Tyler	Eliminated May 5, 2019
Taryn Manning	40	Actress/Singer	Anne	Withdrew on April 28, 2019
Jimmie Walker	71	Actor/Comedian	-	Eliminated on April 21, 2019

== Elimination Chart ==
Team Anne
Team Tyler

Rank	Contestant	Episode						
Rank	Contestant	1	2	3	4	5	6	7
1	Tonya	IN	IN	WIN	WIN	BTM	WIN	WINNER
2	Alec	IN	WIN	WIN	BTM	BTM	WIN	RUNNER-UP
3	Jim	WIN	WIN	IN	IN	IN	OUT	
4	Kym	WIN	BTM	IN	WIN	IN	OUT	
5	Jonathan	BTM	BTM	BTM	OUT			
6	Morgan	IN	IN	OUT				
7	Taryn	IN	WDR					
8	Jimmie	OUT						

Key
(WINNER) This contestant won the competition and was crowned "Best of the Worst".
(RUNNER-UP) The contestant was the runner-up in the finals of the competition.
(WIN) The contestant did the best on their team in the week's Main Dish challenge or Skill Drill and was considered the winner.
(BTM) The contestant was selected as one of the bottom entries in the Main Dish challenge but was not eliminated
(OUT) The contestant lost that week's Main Dish challenge and was out of the competition.
(WDR) The contestant withdrew from the competition.

== Episodes ==
No. overall	No. in season	Title	Original release date
115	1	"Celebrity: This Isn't How It Looks in the Pictures"	April 21, 2019
116	2	"Celebrity: Wheel of Misfortune"	April 28, 2019
117	3	"Celebrity: Take the Bait"	May 5, 2019
118	4	"Celebrity: Around the World in 60 Minutes"	May 12, 2019
119	5	"Celebrity: Waited on Hand and Foot"	May 19, 2019
120	6	"Celebrity: There's No "We" in Food"	May 26, 2019
121	7	"Celebrity: That's a Wrap"	June 2, 2019
