= Worst Cooks in America season 19 =

Worst Cooks in America
- Season 19
- Judges: Anne Burrell; Tyler Florence
- No. of contestants: 7
- Winner: Wells Adams
- Winning mentor: Anne Burrell
- Runner-up: Johnny Bananas
- No. of episodes: 6

Release
- Original network: Food Network
- Original release: May 10 – June 14, 2020

Season chronology
- ← Previous; Season 18 Next → Season 20

Worst Cooks in America 19, also known as Celebrity Edition 6, is the nineteenth season of the American competitive reality television series Worst Cooks in America. This is the sixth iteration of the celebrity editions. It premiered on Food Network on May 10, 2020 and concluded on June 14, 2020. Wells Adams was the winner of this season, with Johnny Bananas as the runner-up.

== Format ==
Worst Cooks in America (Celebrity Edition) is an American reality television series in which celebrities (referred to as "recruits") with poor cooking skills undergo a culinary boot camp for the chance to win a $50,000 prize to donate to the charity of their choice. The recruits are trained on the various basic cooking techniques including baking, knife skills, temperature, seasoning and preparation. Each episode features two core challenges: the Skills Drill, which tests their grasp of basic techniques demonstrated by the chef mentors, and the Main Dish Challenge, where they must apply those skills to recreate or invent a more complex dish under specific guidelines. The weakest performer is eliminated at the end of each episode. The final two contestants prepare a restaurant-quality, three-course meal for a panel of food critics, who evaluate the dishes based on taste, presentation, and overall improvement.

== Judges ==
Tyler Florence returns with Anne Burrell to host the sixth run of the Celebrity Edition. The season premiered on May 10, 2020.

== Recruits ==
Contestant	Age	Occupation	Team	Status
Wells Adams	35	Bachelor in Paradise Star	Anne	Winner on June 14, 2020
Johnny Bananas	37	The Challenge Star	Tyler	Runner-up on June 14, 2020
Dave Coulier	60	Full House Star	Tyler	Eliminated on June 7, 2020
Bridget Everett	47	Comedian & Actress	Anne	Eliminated on June 7, 2020
Robin Givens	55	Actress	Anne	Eliminated on May 31, 2020
Sonja Morgan	56	The Real Housewives of New York City Star	Anne	Eliminated on May 24, 2020
Brian Posehn	53	Comedian and Actor	Tyler	Eliminated on May 17, 2020

== Elimination Chart ==
Rank	Contestant	Episode					
Rank	Contestant	1	2	3	4	5	6
1	Wells	IN	WIN	IN	IN	WIN	WINNER
2	Johnny	BTM	WIN	BTM	WIN	WIN	RUNNER-UP
3	Dave	WIN	IN	WIN	BTM	OUT	
4	Bridget	IN	IN	IN	WIN	OUT	
5	Robin	WIN	IN	WIN	OUT		
6	Sonja	BTM	BTM	OUT			
7	Brian	IN	OUT				

Key
(WINNER) This contestant won the competition and was crimsonowned "Best of the Worst".
(RUNNER-UP) The contestant was the runner-up in the finals of the competition.
(WIN) The contestant did the best on their team in the week's Main Dish challenge or Skill Drill and was considered the winner.
(BTM) The contestant was selected as one of the bottom entries in the Main Dish challenge but was not eliminated.
(OUT) The contestant lost that week's Main Dish challenge and was out of the competition.

== Episodes ==
No. overall	No. in season	Title	Original release date
140	1	"Famous Dish-asters"	May 10, 2020
141	2	"A Day at the Races"	May 17, 2020
142	3	"Sea-List to A-List"	May 24, 2020
143	4	"Robo-Dough"	May 31, 2020
144	5	"Sweet Showdown"	June 7, 2020
145	6	"Fight for Food Fame"	June 14, 2020
