= Worst Cooks in America season 29 =

Worst Cooks in America
- Season 29
- Judges: Gabriele Bertaccini; Anne Burrell
- No. of contestants: 16
- Winner: Todd Zimmerman
- Winning mentor: Gabriele Bertaccini
- Runner-up: Cari Westerman
- No. of episodes: 7

Release
- Original network: Food Network
- Original release: July 28 – September 1, 2025

Season chronology
- ← Previous; Season 28 Next → Season 30

Worst Cooks in America 29, also known as Talented & Terrible, is the twenty-ninth season of the American competitive reality television series Worst Cooks in America. It premiered on Food Network on July 28, 2025 and concluded on September 1, 2025. Todd Zimmerman was the winner of this season, with Cari Westerman as the runner-up.

== Format ==
Worst Cooks in America is an American reality television series in which contestants (referred to as "recruits") with poor cooking skills undergo a culinary boot camp for the chance to win $25,000 and a Food Network cooking set. The recruits are trained on the various basic cooking techniques including baking, knife skills, temperature, seasoning and preparation. Each episode features two core challenges: the Skills Drill, which tests their grasp of basic techniques demonstrated by the chef mentors, and the Main Dish Challenge, where they must apply those skills to recreate or invent a more complex dish under specific guidelines. The weakest performers from each team are eliminated at the end of each episode. The final two contestants prepare a restaurant-quality, three-course meal for a panel of food critics, who evaluate the dishes based on taste, presentation, and overall improvement.

== Judges ==
Gabriele Bertaccini joins Anne Burrell to host Talented & Terrible. This season was recorded in early 2025, but broadcast after Burrell's suicide in June 2025.

== Recruits ==
Contestant	Hometown	Occupation	Team	Status
Todd Zimmerman	Orlando, FL	Circus clown	Gabe	Winner on September 1, 2025
Cari Westerman	Boston, MA	Rapper	Anne	Runner-up on September 1, 2025
Mikki Yamashiro		Professional wrestler	Gabe	Eliminated on September 1, 2025
Preshous Jordan		Professional roller skater	Anne	Eliminated on September 1, 2025
Matthew Anchel	New York, NY	Opera singer	Anne	Eliminated on August 25, 2025
Kyle Torrence	Brooklyn, NY	Musical theatre performer	Gabe	Eliminated on August 25, 2025
Julia Watkins		Violinist	Gabe	Eliminated on August 18, 2025
Nick Thomas	Sterling Heights, MI	Juggler	Anne	Eliminated on August 18, 2025
Rebekah "Bean" Ripley		Gymnast	Gabe	Eliminated on August 18, 2025
GloZell Green		Performer & pianist	Anne	Eliminated on August 18, 2025
Portia Lange		Belly dancer	Anne	Eliminated on August 11, 2025
Chris Tanner		Visual artist	Gabe	Eliminated on August 11, 2025
Lee Colee		Dancer, singer, & performer	Anne	Eliminated on August 4, 2025
Ricky Downes		Comedian, voice actor, & puppeteer	Gabe	Eliminated on August 4, 2025
Shinobi Poli	Tampa, FL	Parkour instructor	-	Eliminated on July 28, 2025
Olive Hui		Performance artist	-	Eliminated on July 28, 2025

== Elimination Chart ==
Team Anne
Team Gabe

Rank	Contestant	Episode							
Rank	Contestant	1	2	3	4	5	6	7	
1	Todd	IN	IMM	WIN	WIN	WIN	BTM	WIN	WINNER
2	Cari	IN	IN	WIN	WIN	WIN	BTM	WIN	RUNNER-UP
3	Mikki	IN	WIN	IN	IN	IN	WIN	OUT	
4	Preshous	IN	WIN	BTM	IN	IN	WIN	OUT	
5	Matthew	IN	IN	BTM	BTM	BTM	OUT		
6	Kyle	IN	IN	IN	BTM	BTM	OUT		
7	Julia	IN	BTM	IN	IN	OUT			
8	Nick	BTM	IN	IN	IN	OUT			
9	Bean	BTM	IN	IN	OUT				
10	GloZell	IN	BTM	IN	OUT				
11	Portia	IN	IMM	OUT					
12	Chris	IN	IN	OUT					
13	Lee	IN	OUT						
14	Ricky	IN	OUT						
15	Shinobi	OUT							
16	Olive	OUT							

Key
(WINNER) This contestant won the competition and was crowned "Best of the Worst".
(RUNNER-UP) The contestant was the runner-up in the finals of the competition.
(WIN) The contestant did the best on their team in the week's Main Dish challenge and was considered the winner.
(IMM) The contestant won immunity and was safe from elimination in the week's Main Dish Challenge.
(BTM) The contestant was selected as one of the bottom entries in the Main Dish challenge, but was not eliminated.
(SWAP) The contestant get switched by a mentor to the other team
(OUT) The contestant lost that week's Main Dish challenge and was out of the competition.

== Episodes ==
No. overall	No. in season	Title	Original release date
213	1	"Talented & Terrible: Boot Camp's Got Talent"	July 28, 2025
214	2	"Talented & Terrible: Culinary Pageant"	August 4, 2025
215	3	"Talented & Terrible: The Da Vinci Cook"	August 11, 2025
216	4	"Talented & Terrible: Flavor Freestyle"	August 18, 2025
217	5	"Talented & Terrible: Big Top Boot Camp"	August 18, 2025
218	6	"Talented & Terrible: Encores and Entrees"	August 25, 2025
219	7	"Talented & Terrible: Culinary Curtain Call"	September 1, 2025
