= Worst Cooks in America season 17 =

Worst Cooks in America
- Season 17
- Judges: Anne Burrell; Bobby Flay
- No. of contestants: 14
- Winner: Adrian Read
- Winning mentor: Bobby Flay
- Runner-up: Juliann Sheldon
- No. of episodes: 8

Release
- Original network: Food Network
- Original release: August 4 – September 22, 2019

Season chronology
- ← Previous; Season 16 Next → Season 18

Worst Cooks in America 17 is the seventeenth season of the American competitive reality television series Worst Cooks in America. It premiered on Food Network on August 4, 2019 and concluded on September 22, 2019. Adrian Read was the winner of this season, with Juliann Sheldon as the runner-up.

== Format ==
Worst Cooks in America is an American reality television series in which contestants (referred to as "recruits") with poor cooking skills undergo a culinary boot camp for the chance to win $25,000 and a Food Network cooking set. The recruits are trained on the various basic cooking techniques including baking, knife skills, temperature, seasoning and preparation. Each episode features two core challenges: the Skills Drill, which tests their grasp of basic techniques demonstrated by the chef mentors, and the Main Dish Challenge, where they must apply those skills to recreate or invent a more complex dish under specific guidelines. The weakest performer is eliminated at the end of each episode. The final two contestants prepare a restaurant-quality, three-course meal for a panel of food critics, who evaluate the dishes based on taste, presentation, and overall improvement.

== Judges ==
Bobby Flay joins Anne Burrell to host season 17. The season, featuring 14 recruits, debuted on August 4, 2019.

== Recruits ==
| Contestant | Age | Hometown | Occupation | Team | Status |
|---|---|---|---|---|---|
| Adrian Read | 29 | Bronx, New York | Zumba Instructor for Seniors | Bobby | Winner on September 22, 2019 |
| Juliann Sheldon | 28 | Charlotte, North Carolina | Professional Cheerleader | Anne | Runner-up on September 22, 2019 |
| Kayla Longstreth | 23 | Firestone, Colorado | Dance Instructor | Bobby | Eliminated on September 15, 2019 |
| Father Adam Young | 34 | Cranston, Rhode Island | Priest | Anne | Eliminated on September 15, 2019 |
| Gina Lam | 28 | San Diego, California | Banker | Bobby | Eliminated on September 8, 2019 |
| Peter Smerlas | 36 | Waltham, Massachusetts | Construction Worker & Rapper | Anne | Eliminated on September 8, 2019 |
| Laith Wallschleger | 26 | Tampa, Florida | Former Professional Football Player | Bobby | Eliminated on September 1, 2019 |
| Sharon Grant | 53 | Dallas, Texas | Minister | Anne | Eliminated on September 1, 2019 |
| Mercedes "Sadie" Manda | 20 | Pittsburgh, Pennsylvania | College Student | Bobby | Eliminated on August 25, 2019 |
| Karma Ann Moody | 47 | Hayesville, North Carolina | Bridal Shop Owner | Anne | Eliminated on August 25, 2019 |
| Jonathan Beyer | 37 | New York, New York | Opera singer | Bobby | Eliminated on August 11, 2019 |
| Terry Grawey | 62 | Peoria, Illinois | Hypnotist | Anne | Eliminated on August 11, 2019 |
| Idriss Allison | 30 | Bronx, New York | Transformational Coach | Bobby | Eliminated on August 4, 2019 |
| Nina Kharoufeh | 25 | Cliffside Park, New Jersey | News Curator | Anne | Eliminated on August 4, 2019 |

== Elimination Chart ==
Team Anne
Team Bobby

* Initially a member of the other team

| Rank | Contestant | Episode | | | | | | | | |
| Rank | Contestant | 1 | 2 | 3 | | 4 | 5 | 6 | 7 | 8 |
|---|---|---|---|---|---|---|---|---|---|---|
| 1 | Adrian* | WIN | IN | SWAP | WIN | IN | IN | BTM | WIN | WINNER |
| 2 | Juliann | IN | BTM | IN | WIN | IN | WIN | BTM | WIN | RUNNER-UP |
| 3 | Kayla | BTM | WIN | IN | IN | IN | WIN | WIN | OUT | |
| 4 | Adam | IN | WIN | IN | BTM | BTM | BTM | WIN | OUT | |
| 5 | Gina | IN | IN | IN | BTM | BTM | BTM | OUT | | |
| 6 | Peter | IN | IN | IN | BTM | IN | IN | OUT | | |
| 7 | Laith | IN | BTM | IN | BTM | WIN | OUT | | | |
| 8 | Sharon* | IN | IN | SWAP | IN | WIN | OUT | | | |
| 9 | Sadie | WIN | IN | IN | IN | OUT | | | | |
| 10 | Karma | IN | IN | IN | IN | OUT | | | | |
| 11 | Jonathan | IN | OUT | | | | | | | |
| 12 | Terry | BTM | OUT | | | | | | | |
| 13 | Idriss | OUT | | | | | | | | |
| 14 | Nina | OUT | | | | | | | | |

- Since the Red Team won the Ice Cream Skill Drill game in Week 3, Chef Anne had the choice of taking one of the Blue recruits and swapping with one of her own. She chose Adrian from her own team and Sharon from the Blue Team to swap.

Key
(WINNER) This contestant won the competition and was crowned "Best of the Worst".
(RUNNER-UP) The contestant was the runner-up in the finals of the competition.
(WIN) The contestant did the best on their team in the week's Main Dish challenge or Skill Drill and was considered the winner.
(BTM) The contestant was selected as one of the bottom entries in the Main Dish challenge, but was not eliminated.
(SWAP) The contestant get switched by a mentor to the other team.
(OUT) The contestant lost that week's Main Dish challenge and was out of the competition.

== Episodes ==
| No. overall | No. in season | Title | Original release date |
|---|---|---|---|
| 122 | 1 | "Nowhere to Go But Up" | August 4, 2019 |
| 123 | 2 | "My Big Fat Greek..." | August 11, 2019 |
| 124 | 3 | "Summer Catch, Summer Heat" | August 18, 2019 |
| 125 | 4 | "The Bird Is the Word" | August 25, 2019 |
| 126 | 5 | "Viva Mexico!" | September 1, 2019 |
| 127 | 6 | "A Very Brady Brunch" | September 8, 2019 |
| 128 | 7 | "A Little Goes a Long Way" | September 15, 2019 |
| 129 | 8 | "Two Cooks, One Prize" | September 22, 2019 |
