= Pittsburgh rare =

Method of cooking steak

A Pittsburgh rare steak is one that has been heated to a very high temperature very quickly, so it is charred on the outside but still rare or raw on the inside. The degree of rareness and the amount of charring on the outside may vary according to taste. The term "Pittsburgh rare" is used in some parts of the American Midwest and Eastern Seaboard, but similar methods of sear cooking are known by different terms elsewhere, including Blue Steak, Chicago-style rare and, in Pittsburgh itself, black and blue.

== Origin of the term ==
There are several possible explanations for the origin of term:

- One story recounts that a local slaughterhouse during the Great Depression was looking to make extra money and opened a restaurant in the front. Wealthy socialites could choose their cut of meat off of a live cow and wait while it was slaughtered. The steak would then be seared to kill bacteria and served at the cow's body temperature, thus creating "Pittsburgh Rare".
- Another story affirms that the term started in the various steel mills in and around Pittsburgh. The mill workers needed high calorie food for the heavy work and had only 30 minutes for lunch. The blast furnaces were heated to over 2,000 °F (1,100 °C). They would throw a steak on the side of the blast furnace (which was sterile due to the high heat), leave it for a few moments, and then turn it. The steak was seared but raw inside.
- One story relates that the method originated as an explanation for an accidental charring of a steak at a Pittsburgh restaurant, with the cook explaining that this was "Pittsburgh style".

It has been said that the "original" method of preparation was by searing the meat with a welding torch. Whether this is true or not is unknown. Another method, related by a staff member at a Pittsburgh branch of Ruth's Chris Steak House, originates from the region's steel mills and the practice of workers cooking a steak on a cooling piece of steel. The temperature of the steel would be such that it would be impossible to do more than char the outside of the steak while keeping anything worth eating. One popular version of this myth is that steel workers would bring raw steaks to work and, on their lunch break, throw them against the huge searing-hot molten steel "tubs". The steak would burn almost immediately and then fall off, after which they would put the other side of the steak up against the tub to finish it. Whether any of these origins are genuine or just a play on Pittsburgh's industrial image is debatable.

== Current usage ==
Many restaurant guests use the term Pittsburgh to describe a steak that is extra-charred on the outside, no matter what internal temperature is desired.

There is a restaurant chain in the Minneapolis area called Pittsburgh Blue. It is a steakhouse based on this type of cooking. The explanation given in the menu revolves around steelworkers cooking steaks on hot iron. Instead of calling this Pittsburgh rare (at least in Minneapolis), they call it Pittsburgh Blue or black and blue. Black refers to the char and blue refers to the rare interior of the steak.

== See also ==
- Tataki
- Doneness
- Searing
