= Gabriele Bertaccini =

Italian chef and television personality

- Born: 16 December 1985 (age 40); Florence, Italy
- Education: Buontalenti Institute of Culinary Arts and Management; Arizona State University
- Occupations: Chef, television personality

Gabriele Bertaccini (born 18 December 1985), also known as Gabe Bertaccini, is an Italian chef, television personality, and writer. He is known for his roles on the Netflix series Say I Do (2020) and the Food Network series Ciao House (2023–). He was a mentor on the twenty-ninth season of the Food Network series Worst Cooks in America (2025).

== Life and career ==
Bertaccini was born and raised in Florence to a Mormon Italian family. He learned to cook at the age of 13, training at the Bernardo Buontalenti Institute of Culinary Arts and Management in regional Italian cuisine with a speciality in Tuscan cuisine as well as in food and beverage management. He then worked at several restaurants and hotels such as Ristorante Sabatini, Grand Hotel Baglioni, and Hotel Astoria and was named head chef at boutique restaurant Conquinarius.

He moved to the United States to study journalism and PR at Arizona State University. Bertaccini founded his first catering company, il TOCCO FOOD, in 2008. His second catering company, Culinary Mischief, is dedicated to invitation-only experiences, and his third, the [UN]OFFICIAL, was founded in 2015. He was a food and wine columnist for the local Green Living Magazine.

In 2019, he became one of the hosts and the food expert on the Netflix reality series Say I Do.

In April 2023, a new culinary competition Ciao House premiered on the Food Network, with Bertaccini as one of the co-hosts and celebrity guest judges alongside Alex Guarnaschelli.

== Personal life ==
Bertaccini is based in Venice, Los Angeles with his four Australian Shepherds. He is openly gay. In the first episode of Say I Do, he revealed he is HIV-positive.
