= Pat Nourse =

Australian food critic (born 1977)

- Born: Patrick Nourse; 1977 (age 48–49)
- Occupations: Columnist, editor

Pat Nourse (born 1977) is an Australian restaurant critic and food writer. He is the Creative Director for the Melbourne Food & Wine Festival, and was formerly employed by Australian Gourmet Traveller magazine as their chief restaurant critic and deputy editor. He also writes about Australia for the American food magazine Gourmet, and is the Australian member of the voting academy for the World's 50 Best Restaurants. He has been a contributor to The Age Good Food Guide and The Sydney Morning Herald Good Food Guide, among other publications.

== Criticism ==
Nourse has been critical in his reviews of the use of truffle oil and other synthetic food products, and the promotion of shark fin on restaurant menus in Australia.
