= Domaine Javier =

Filipino-American actress

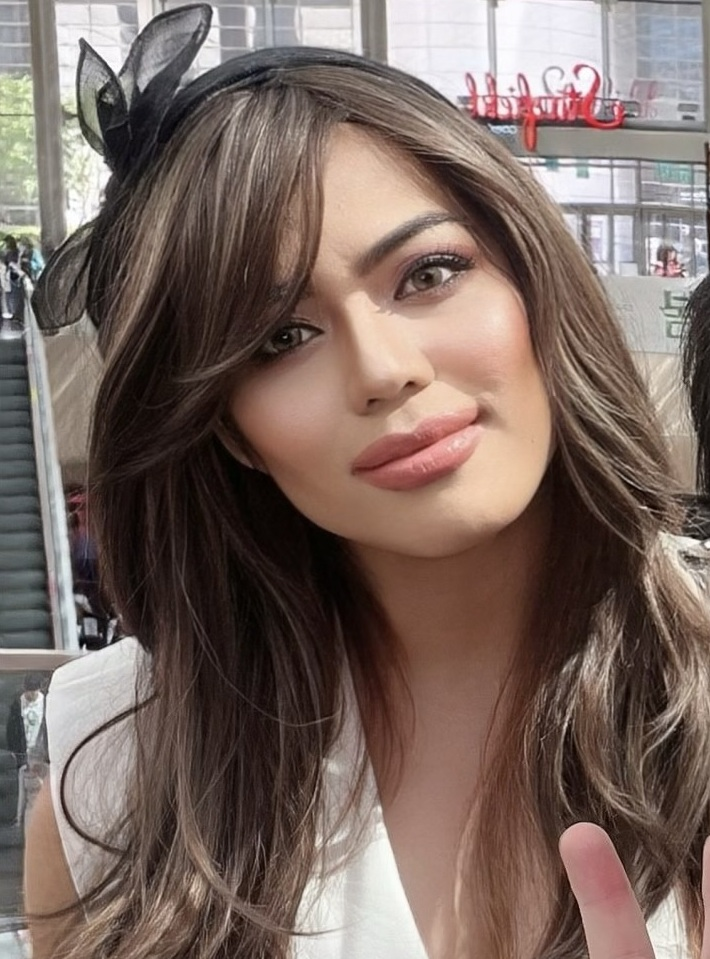
- Javier in May 2024
- Born: 1987 (age 38–39); Philippines
- Education: Riverside City College (AA, AS); Western Governors University (BS, MS); United States University (MS) University of Central Arkansas (DNP)
- Occupations: Actress, TV Personality, Advanced Practice Nurse
- Years active: 2011–present

Domainlor Javier Cabading (born 1987) is a Filipino-American actress, advanced practice nurse, and TV personality. She came to prominence after appearing on the MTV show True Life and being expelled by and suing California Baptist University over her right to study nursing there as a transgender woman.

== Early life and education ==
Javier is of Filipina, White, Spanish, Pacific Islander, Native American, and Chinese heritage, but mostly identifies as Filipina. Domaine was born in the Philippines in 1987 and emigrated to the USA in 2007.

She has publicly identified as female since she was 13, and graduated valedictorian from high school despite bullying.

She attended Riverside City College, where she was chosen Homecoming queen in 2010. In 2011, she was to have transferred in the fall to California Baptist University, also in Riverside, to study nursing on academic and music scholarships, when an April episode of the MTV reality series True Life based on a year in her life led the university to accuse her of fraud for stating her gender as female on her application; she was suspended and then expelled.

She continued her studies at Riverside City College and became a registered nurse. In 2013, she received the Kaiser Permanente Nursing Scholarship Award via eQuality Scholarship Collaborative for her service to the LGBTQ+ community.

In 2013, she sued California Baptist University for unlawful discrimination under the California Unruh Civil Rights Act and breach of contract; in July 2014, a judge ruled that as a private religious institution, the college was entitled to exclude transgender people from in-person classes, but that it must not discriminate against them in its for-profit businesses and services open to the public, including online classes, and awarded her $4,000 in damages plus costs. The breach of contract suit was rejected on procedural grounds.

In November 2022, Javier was congressionally-recognized by the United States House of Representatives for her outstanding achievements and contributions to the community.

=== Academic degrees ===
Javier has earned the following academic degrees:

- Associate in Arts, Riverside City College, Fine & Applied Arts, concentration in Performing Arts (Acting and Musical Theatre)
- Associate in Arts, Riverside City College, Humanities, Philosophies, & Arts
- Associate in Arts, Riverside City College, Social & Behavioral Studies
- Associate in Science, Riverside City College, Nursing
- Associate in Science, Riverside City College, Math & Science
- Bachelor of Science in Nursing, Western Governors University
- Master of Science in Nursing Education, Western Governors University
- Master of Science in Nursing Leadership & Management, Western Governors University
- Master of Science in Nursing - Family Nurse Practitioner, United States University
- Doctor of Nursing Practice, University of Central Arkansas.

In May 2026, Javier announced her pursuit of an eleventh degree at Sogang University..

== Performing career ==
In November 2011, Javier appeared in an edition of Anderson Cooper's talk show, Anderson Live, on transgender youth.

In June 2020, she was a contestant in the 20th season of Worst Cooks in America, the first openly transgender woman to appear on the Food Network. Under the mentorship of Chef Anne Burrell, Javier finished in 5th place. She returned in 2021 in the companion series Worst Cooks in America: Dirty Dishes, in which favorite former recruits watch past episodes of the show and react to them. She also competed on the first-ever all-stars season of Worst Cooks in America titled "Best of the Worst", in which fan-favorite recruits from past seasons returned for another shot at redemption. The show premiered on April 25, 2021, and concluded on May 30, 2021. Javier finished as the finalist for Chef Michael Symon's Blue Team and ultimately placed as the runner-up.

As an actress, she appeared in a 2013 episode of Adam Devine's House Party titled "Front Yard Comedy" and was cast as Sü, the lead character in The Switch, a comedy series that became the first television series produced and directed by a transgender person and with all transgender roles played by transgender actors. However, because it was a Canadian production that requires certain rules and regulations, the role eventually had to be recast.

She has also played small roles in a number of other TV series and feature films, including the 2015 horror short Lucid Dark.

Most recently, in 2024, Javier portrayed Starling "Star" Smith in the feature film Another Day in America, a comedy-drama centered on an ensemble of characters navigating workplace dynamics and contemporary social issues. In a published review, her performance was described as effectively blending humor with emotional depth. The film received the Indie Spirit Award of Excellence in Filmmaking at the Boston International Film Festival.

== Filmography ==
=== Film ===
Year	Title	Role	Notes
2014	Captain America: The Winter Soldier	ER Nurse	Feature film
2015	Lucid Dark	Nurse Barnes	Short film
2017	Dismissed	High School Teacher	Feature film
2024	Another Day in America	Starling "Star" Smith	Feature film

=== Television ===
Year	Title	Role	Notes
2011	True Life	Herself	Episode: "I'm Passing"
2011	Anderson Live	Herself	Episode: "Children & Teens Trapped in the Wrong Body"
2012	True Life	Herself	Episode: "Then and Now"
2013	True Life	Herself	Episode: "True Life's Greatest Moments Ever"
2013	Adam DeVine's House Party	Annie's Bestie	Episode: "Front Yard Comedy"
2014	Parenthood	Frat Girl	Episode: "The Enchanting Mr. Knight"
2014	Mike & Molly	Bar Patron	Episode: "Rich Man, Poor Girl"
2014	Revenge	Opera Attendee	Episode: "Disgrace"
2014	Perception	Nurse	2 episodes
2014	The Bridge	Prison Nurse	Episode: "The Acorn"
2016	Angie Tribeca	Library Patron	Episode: "Commissioner Bigfish"
2016	The Switch	Sü	Teaser Pilot
2017	Game Shakers	Wedding Guest	Episode: "Wedding Shower of Doom"
2020	Worst Cooks in America	Herself	5 episodes (5th place)
2021	Worst Cooks in America: Dirty Dishes	Herself	8 episodes
2021	Worst Cooks in America: Best of the Worst	Herself	6 episodes (runner-up)
2022	Kenan	Dr. Anna Siciliano	Episode: "Destroying Miami"
