= Food critic =

Writer who analyzes food or restaurants

A food critic or restaurant critic produces written commentary on dining experiences.

== Roles ==
Food critics patronize restaurants to report on the food, service, and environment. According to the Auguste Escoffier School of Culinary Arts, food critics should be aware of trends on both the global and local stages so that their audience can derive meaning from what they write. The school cites keeping up with restaurant openings, closings, and well-known chefs as examples of what "good" food critics do as part of their job. As believed by the Auguste Escoffier School of Culinary Arts, the goal of food critics is to provide prospective restaurant goers with impartial reviews for them to be informed consumers, while offering the business exposure and keeping them accountable. Oftentimes, food critics will conceal their identity to ensure that favoritism does not affect the review's accuracy.

== Terminology and distinctions ==
For some casual food bloggers, such as Lauren Monitz Durie, creator of The DownLo blog, being named as a food critic is a faulty description. According to Durie, food critics must eat at a restaurant at a minimum of three times and be fully anonymous. As a food columnist, she does not report on unpleasant restaurant experiences and seldom visits those establishments more than twice; Durie also does not abide by the strict food critic anonymity standards. Durie describes her job as one that requires neutrality to guide soon-to-be patrons. According to her blog, she does not publish strong opinions and keeps her audience interested through descriptions of the restaurant's food, drinks, and environment.

Durie believes food critics must visit restaurants at least three times to provide updates regarding changes in food and service. She states, "To have a Truly Unbiased Opinion, Food Critics Should Eat at Each Restaurant at least 3x. Both good and bad, it gives the restaurant a chance to redeem itself if a meal was terrible. Maybe the kitchen was having an off night, or it was extraordinarily busy to the point of affecting service. Conversely, if a restaurant wowed us, it has to live up to those expectations two more times to prove it wasn't just a fluke." As a food columnist or restaurant writer, she refrains from alerting the restaurant to her presence, but unlike food critics, she is not completely anonymous. Durie directly says, "...To the rest of the world, she's [Durie's food critic acquaintance] an enigma. She conducts all her interviews over the phone, pays in cash and can't show an ID to buy booze" and "I can technically tell a restaurant or their PR rep I'm there to write about it, if they want to show off a new menu item for example, but for the most part, I don't since it is supposed to be the average patron's experience."

== Notable food critics ==
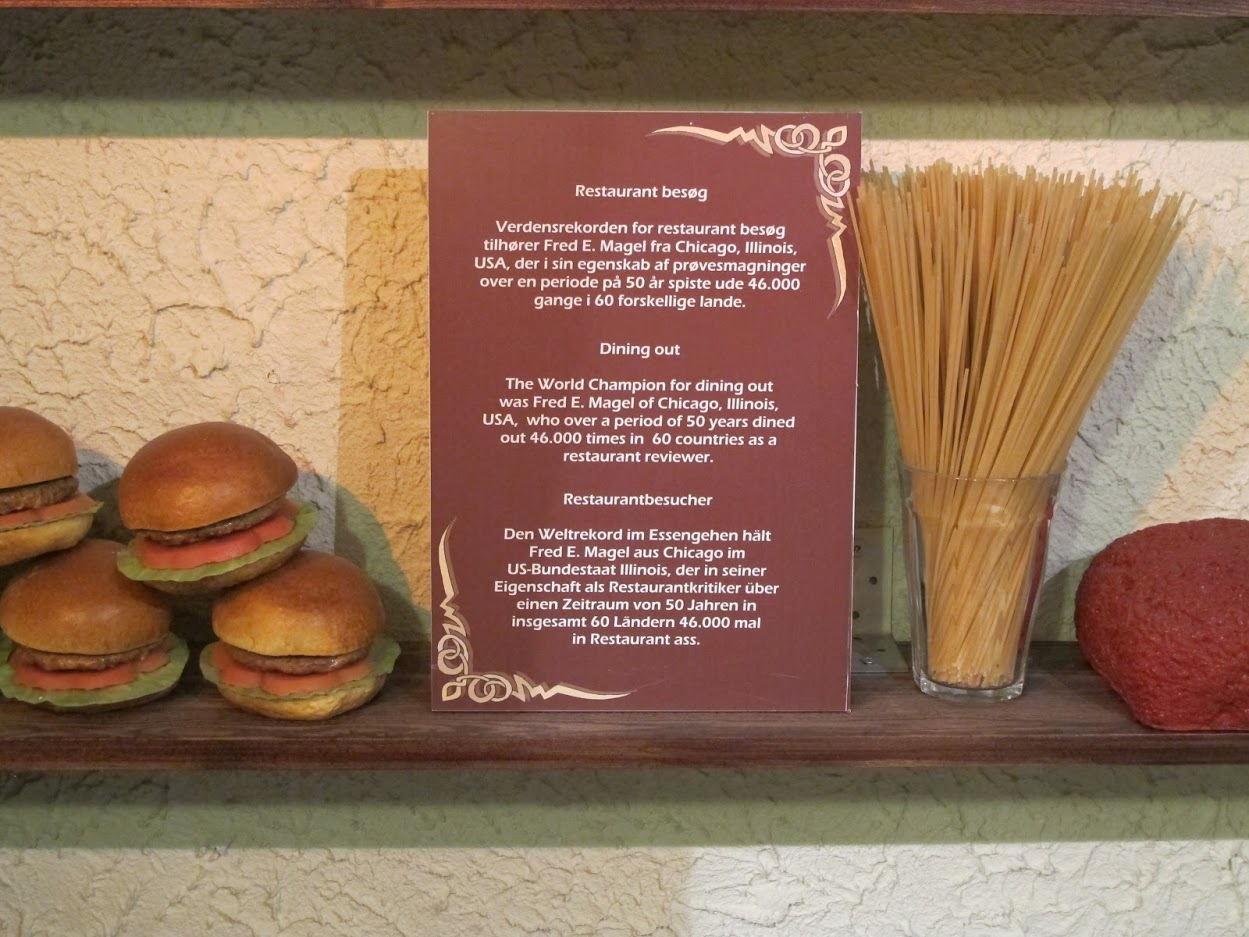
Sign acknowledging record of 46,000 meals eaten by food critic Fred E. Magel

Fred Magel holds the Guinness World Record for most restaurants eaten at in a lifetime. Magel never married; he dedicated his life to passion as a food critic. He dined at over 46,000 restaurants in sixty countries in fifty years, for every meal three times a day (Magel's house in Illinois did not have a kitchen). In 1970, Magel wrote a letter to the Guinness World Records stating, "I dine to live, and not live to eat."

In an Eater article, Tim Forster and Brenna Houck describe A.A. Gill as a precise food critic. Forster and Houck name some of his restaurant reviews as "take-downs" and "savage". Examples include a 2003 Vanity Fair review where Gill states, "To say the food is repellently awful would be to credit it with a vim and vigor and attitude it simply can't rise to. The bowls and dishes dribble and limp to the table with a yawning lassitude. A vain, empty ennui. They weren't so much presented as wilted and folded to death. It was all prepared with that most depressing and effete culinary style—tepid whimsy. Tell me, off the top of your head, what two attributes should hot-and-sour soup have? Take your time. It was neither. Nor anything else much," and Gill's Sunday Times review for a luxury hotel in London, where Gill stated "The most depressing and uncongenial meal, in an anemic, echoey building, made even more wrist-slashingly ghastly by the sad and silent ghosts of a century of culture and élan and bibulous brilliance."

In a 2008 article from The Independent, Terry Durack gives a synopsis of his life. Durack says, "I love to eat and I love to write, and I can't imagine a better job in the world than one that allows me to do both. I am a restaurant critic – and it's the job I was born to do." When asked about his job, Durack says his job is telling others where to eat, why they should eat at that location, and where not to eat and why they should not eat at that location. Durack says he does this because he wants to spread his love for food he finds pleasant and disdain for food he finds unpleasant.

There are regional food critics. Examples include Nancy Leson in Seattle, Pat Nourse in Sydney, Cooper Adams in Albany, and Stephen Downes and John Lethlean in Melbourne, who pen weekly and monthly reviews of the best of their respective cities.

Giles Coren is known for hosting the show Million Dollar Critic in which he assesses restaurants in Canada and United States, focusing on the quality of services, food taste and the ambiance of every restaurant he visits. He has also been a food columnist for The Times, GQ, Tatler and The Independent.

== On the internet ==
To adapt to the digital world, food critics reach their audiences through podcasts and vlogs.

== See also ==
- Culinary arts
- Food grading
- Food journalism
- Food libel laws
- Food writing
- Gastronomy
- Gourmet ideal
- List of James Beard Award winners for Best Restaurant Review or Critique
- Restaurant rating
