= Doneness =

Degree to which a piece of meat is cooked

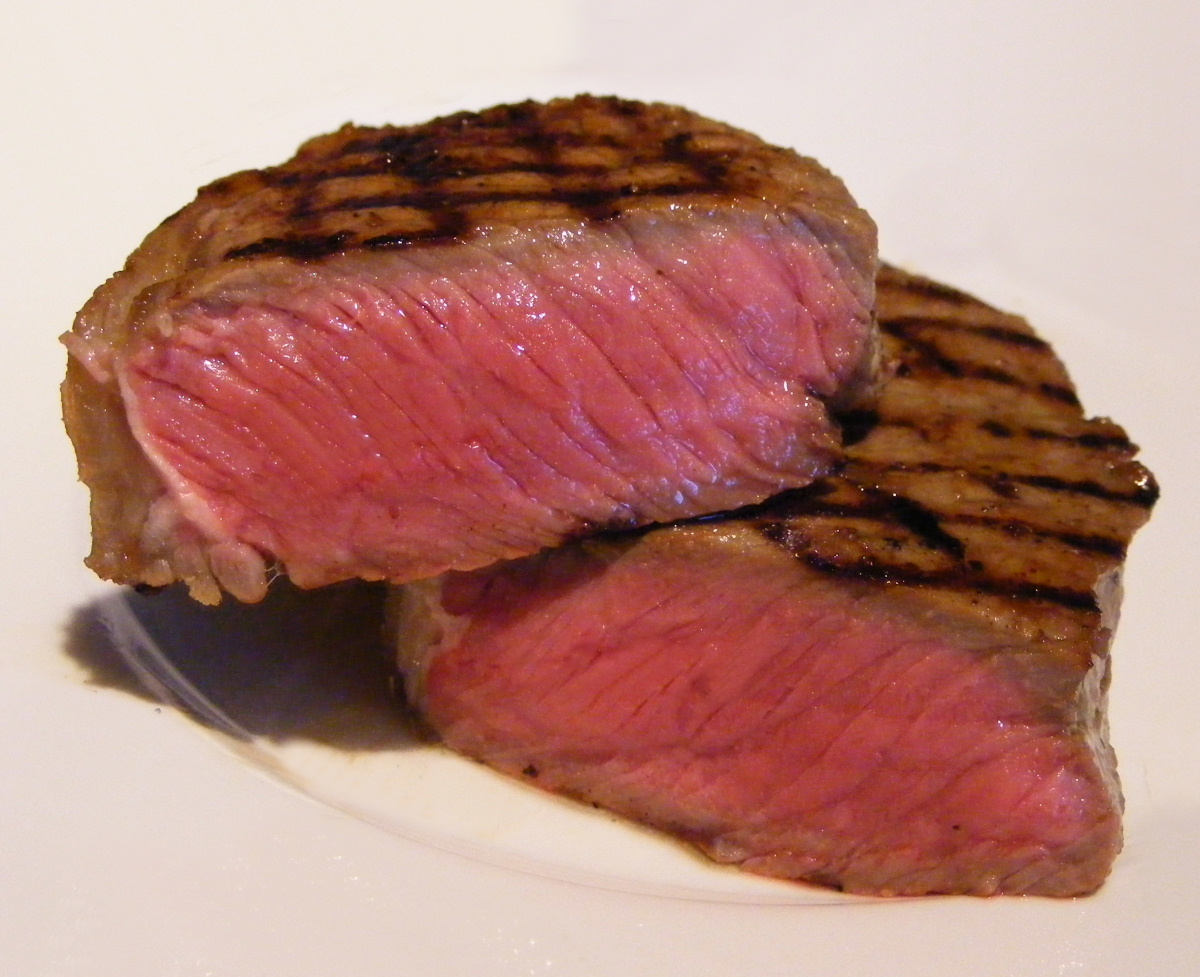
Entrecôte cooked to rare

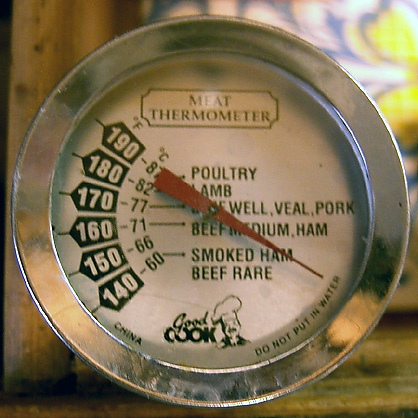
A meat thermometer

Doneness is a gauge of how thoroughly cooked a cut of meat is based on its color, juiciness, and internal temperature. The gradations are most often used in reference to beef (especially steaks and roasts) but are also applicable to other types of meat.

Gradations, their descriptions, and their associated temperatures vary regionally, with different cuisines using different cooking procedures and terminology. For steaks, common gradations include rare, medium rare, medium, medium well, and well done.

== Temperature ==
The table below is from an American reference book and pertains to beef and lamb.

Temperatures for beef, veal and lamb steaks and roasts
Term (French)	Description	Temperature range		USDA recommended
Extra-rare or Blue (bleu)	very red	46–49 °C	115–125 °F	
Rare (saignant)	red center; soft	52–55 °C	125–130 °F	
Medium rare (à point)	warm red center; firmer	55–60 °C	130–140 °F	
Medium (demi-anglais)	pink and firm	60–65 °C	140–150 °F	145 °F and rest for at least 5 minutes
Medium well (cuit)	small amount of pink in the center	65–69 °C	150–155 °F	
Well done (bien cuit)	gray-brown throughout; firm	71 °C+	160 °F+	160 °F for ground beef
Overcooked/Burned	blackened throughout; hard	>71 °C	>160 °F	

The interior of a cut of meat will still increase in temperature by 3–5 °C (5–9 °F) after it is removed from an oven or other heat source as the hot exterior continues to warm the comparatively cooler interior (indeed it can increase by more, depending on factors such as a high ambient temperature). The exception is if the meat has been prepared in a sous-vide process or some other low-temperature cooking technique, as it will already be at temperature equilibrium. The temperatures indicated above are the peak temperatures in the cooking process, so the meat should be removed from the heat source when it is some degrees cooler (depending on power of heat source, size of cut).

The meat should be allowed to "rest" for a suitable amount of time (depending on the size of the cut) before being served. This makes it easier to carve and makes its structure firmer and more resistant to deformation. Its water-holding capacity also increases and less liquid is lost from the meat during carving.

== Color ==
As meat is cooked, it turns from red to pink to gray to brown to black (if burnt), and the amount of myoglobin and other juices decreases. The color change is due to changes in the oxidation of the iron atom of the heme group in the myoglobin protein. Raw meat is red due to the myoglobin protein in the muscles, not hemoglobin from blood (which also contains a heme group, hence the color). Before cooking, the iron atom is in a +2 oxidation state and bound to a dioxygen molecule (O_{2}), giving raw meat its red color. As meat cooks, the iron atom loses an electron, moving to a +3 oxidation state and coordinating with a water molecule (H_{2}O), which causes the meat to turn brown.

Searing raises the meat's surface temperature to 150 °C (302 °F), yielding browning via the caramelization of sugars and the Maillard reaction of amino acids. If raised to a high enough temperature, meat blackens from burning.

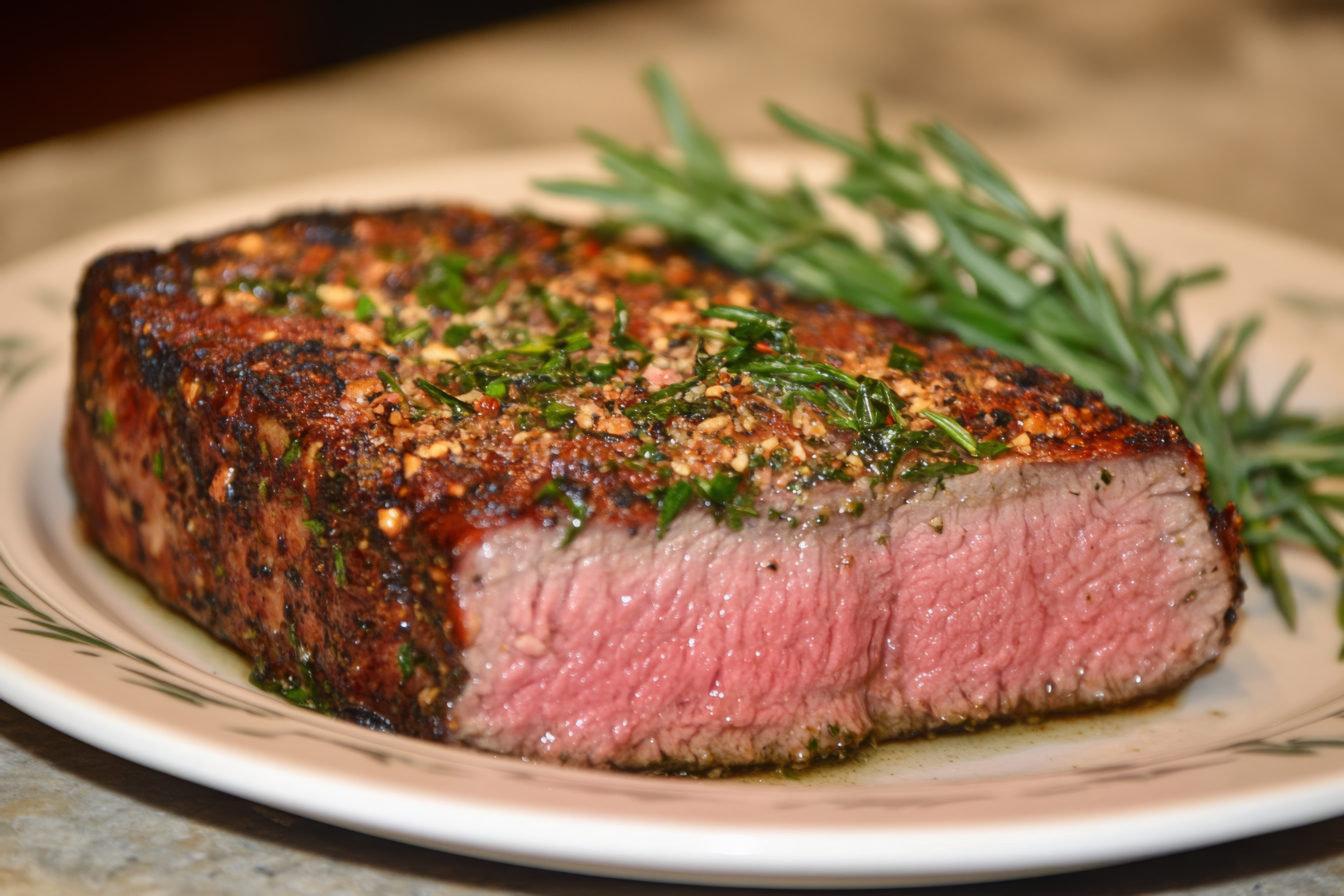
Medium rare steak

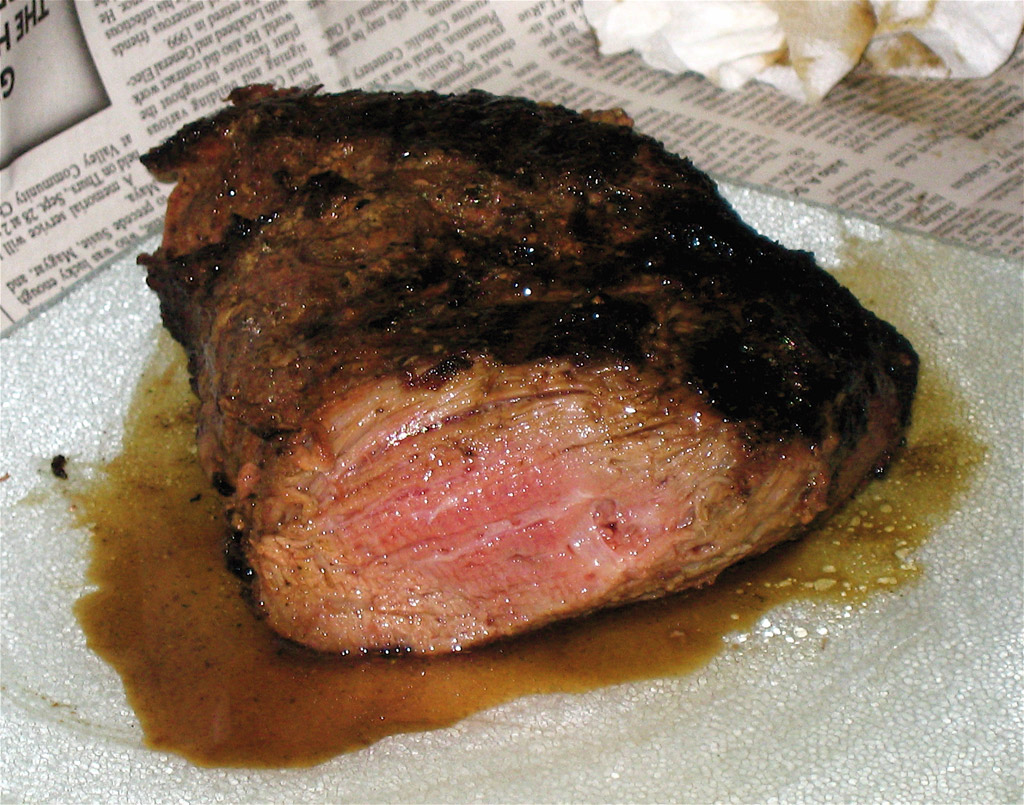
Medium steak

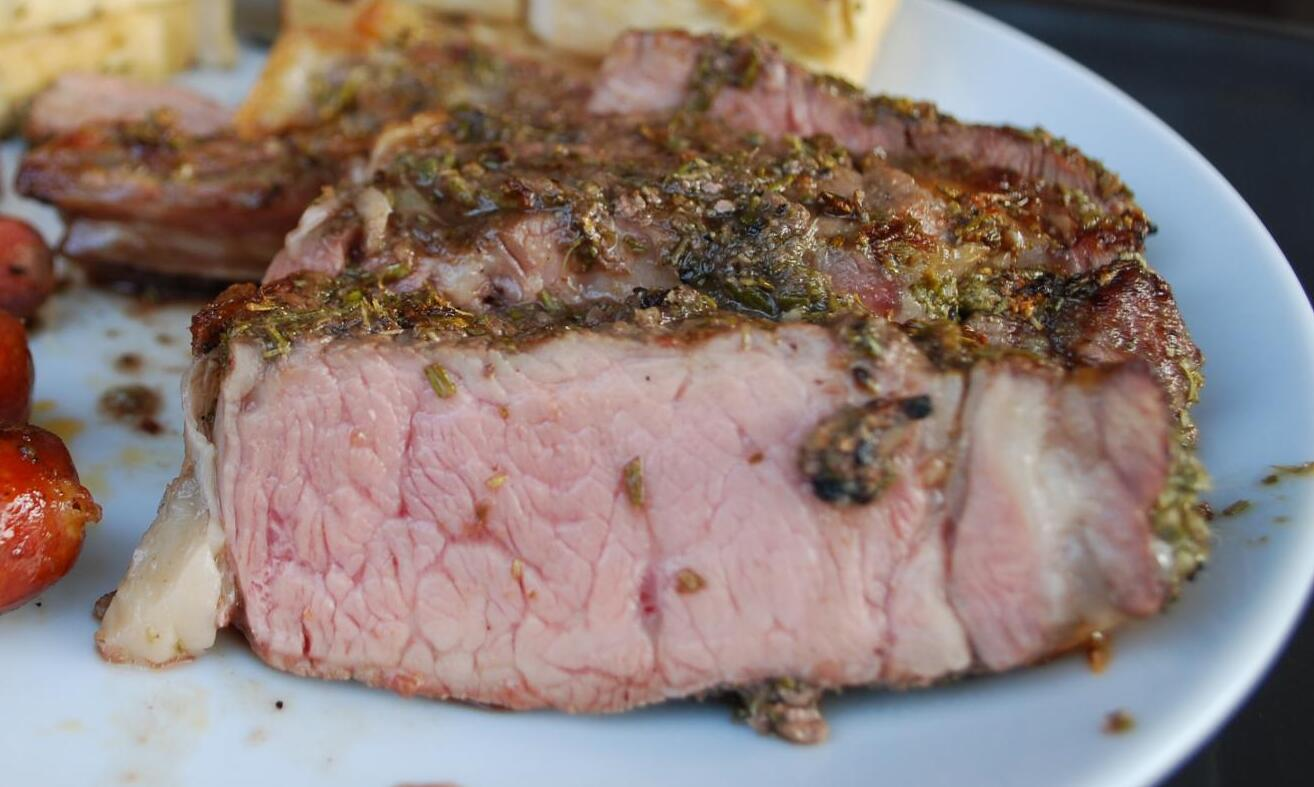
Medium well steak

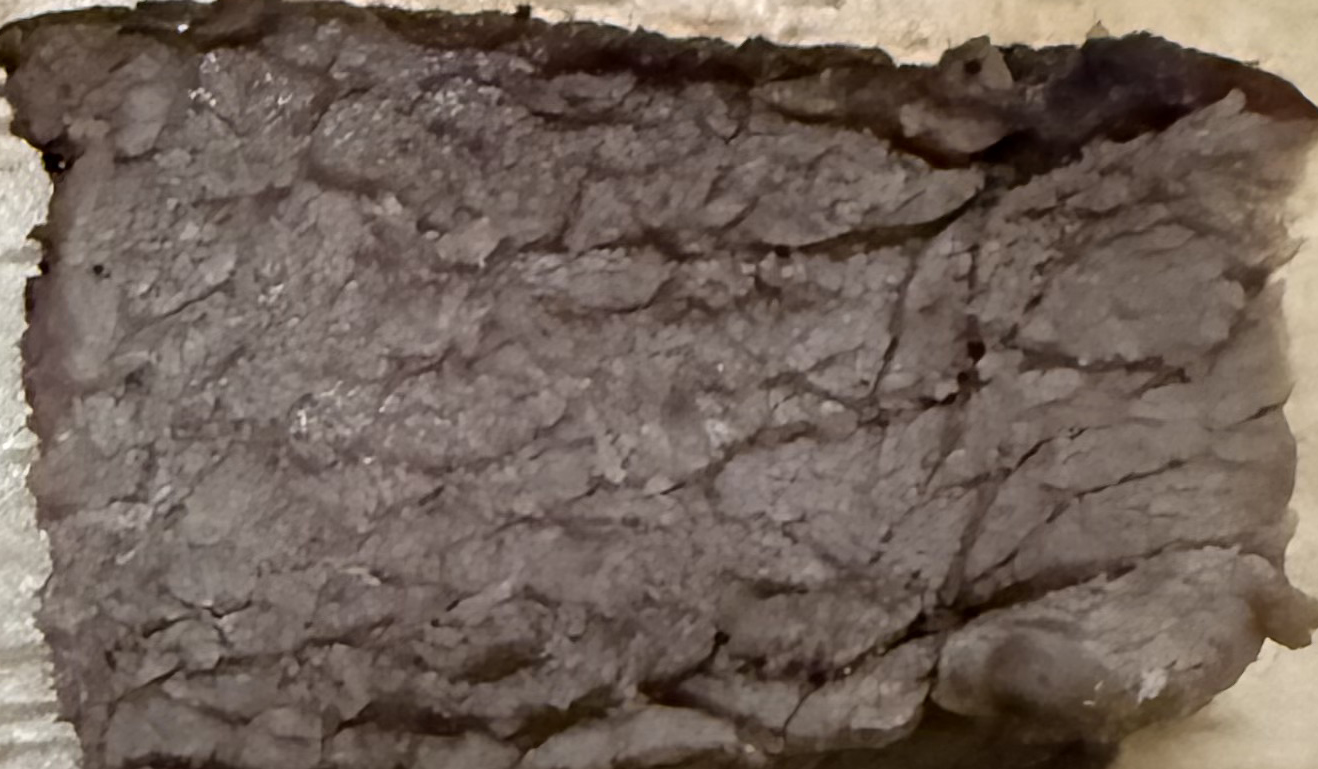
Well done steak

== Drying ==
Well done cuts, in addition to being brown, are drier than other cuts and contain few or no juices. Note that searing (cooking the exterior at a high temperature) in no way "seals in the juices", since water evaporates at the same or higher rates as it does in unseared meat. However, searing does play an important role in browning, which is a crucial contributor to flavor and texture.

== Safety ==
The United States Department of Agriculture has stated that rare steaks are unsafe to eat. It recommends an internal temperature of at least 145 °F (63 °C) for cuts of beef, veal, and lamb in order to prevent foodborne illness, and warns that color and texture indicators are not reliable. The same meats should be thoroughly cooked to 160 °F (71 °C) when ground or tenderized by cutting, since these processes distribute bacteria throughout the meat.

Usually, most bacteria do not enter the inside of uncooked meat and remain on the surface. However, proteolytic bacteria are able to dissolve or break down the connective tissue and fibers of the meat and enter the inside. Non-proteolytic bacteria such as Escherichia coli do not enter inside the meat.

== See also ==
- Pittsburgh rare
