= Seasoning =

Process of supplementing food via herbs, salts, or spices

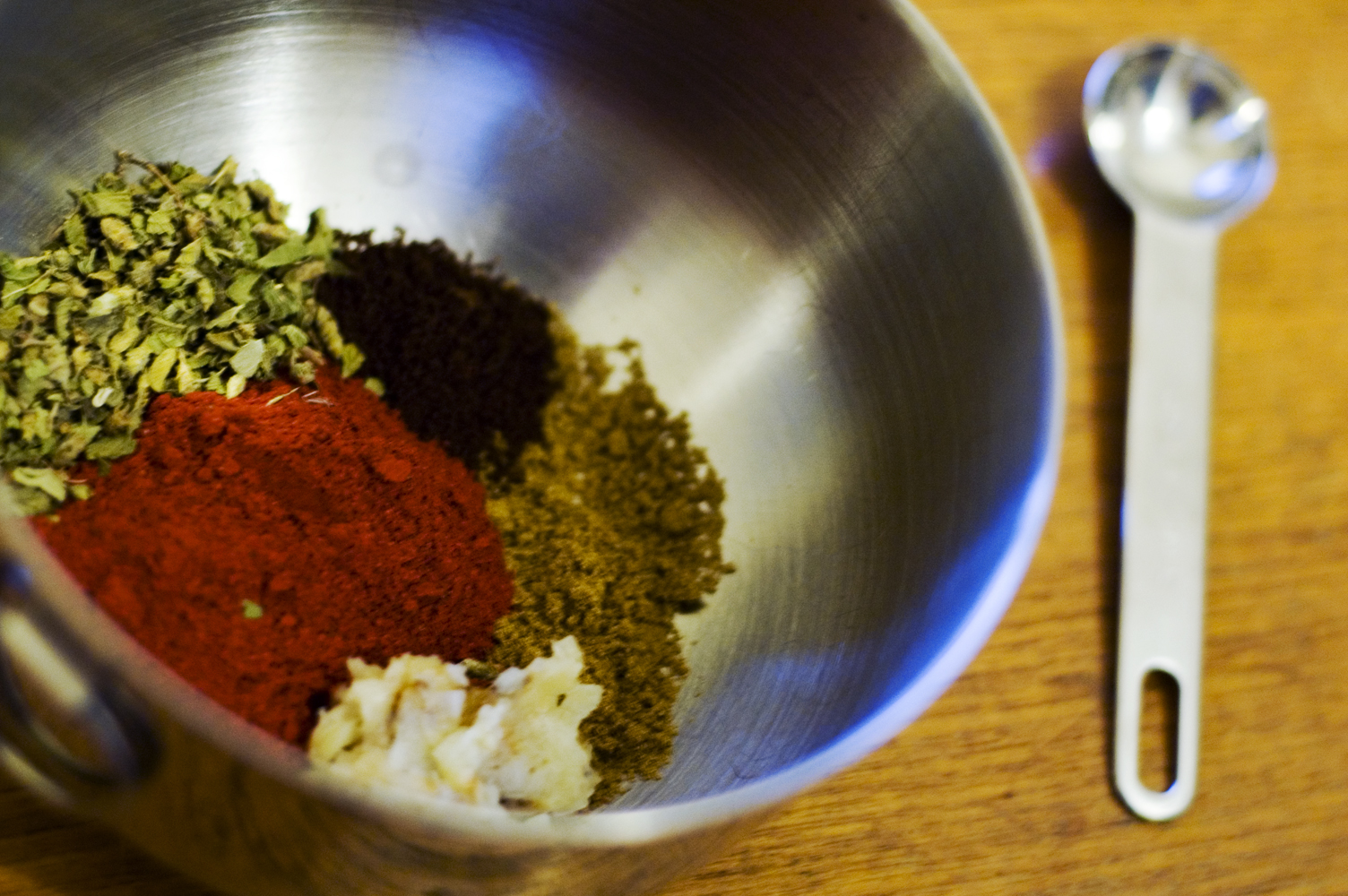
The ingredients for achiote paste: oregano, ground cloves, ground cumin, minced garlic, and ground annatto

Seasoning is the process of supplementing food via one or more of herbs, spices, and salts, intended to enhance a particular flavour.

== General meaning ==
Seasonings include herbs and spices, which are themselves frequently referred to as "seasonings". Salt may be used to draw out water, or to magnify a natural flavor of a food making it richer or more delicate, depending on the dish. This type of procedure is akin to curing. For instance, sea salt (a coarser-grained salt) is rubbed into chicken, lamb, and beef to tenderize the meat and improve flavour. Other seasonings like black pepper and basil transfer some of their flavors to the food. A well-designed dish may combine seasonings that complement each other.

In addition to the choice of herbs and seasonings, the timing of when flavors are added will affect the food that is being cooked or otherwise prepared. Seasonings are usually added near the end of the cooking period, or even at the table, when the food is served. The most common table-seasonings are salt, pepper, and acids (such as lemon juice). When seasonings are used properly, they cannot be tasted; their job is to heighten the flavors of the original ingredients.

Researchers have found traces of garlic mustard seeds in prehistoric pots that also contained traces of meat, making this the earliest recording of seasoning food.

== Oil infusion ==
Infused oils are also used for seasoning. There are two methods for doing an infusion—hot and cold. Olive oil makes a good infusion base for some herbs, but tends to go rancid more quickly than other oils. Infused oils should be kept refrigerated.

== Escoffier ==
In Le Guide Culinaire, Auguste Escoffier divides seasoning and condiments into the following groups:

=== Seasonings ===
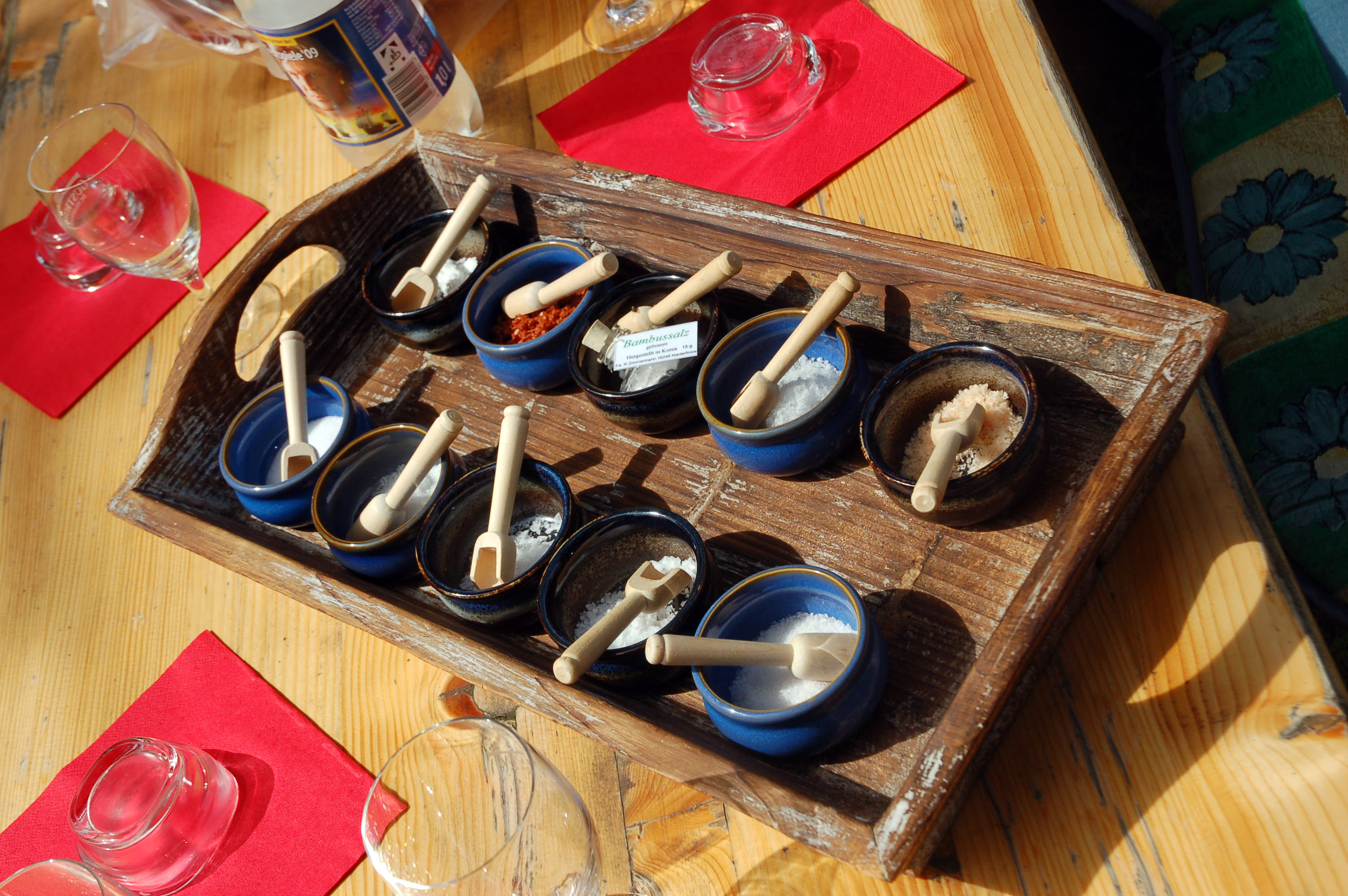
Salts

1. Saline seasonings – salt, spiced salt, saltpeter.
2. Acid seasonings – plain vinegar (sodium acetate), or same aromatized with tarragon; verjuice, lemon and orange juices.
3. Hot seasonings – peppercorns, ground or coarsely chopped pepper, or mignonette pepper; paprika, curry, cayenne, and mixed pepper spices.
4. Spice seasonings – made by using essential oils like paprika, clove oil, etc.

=== Condiments ===
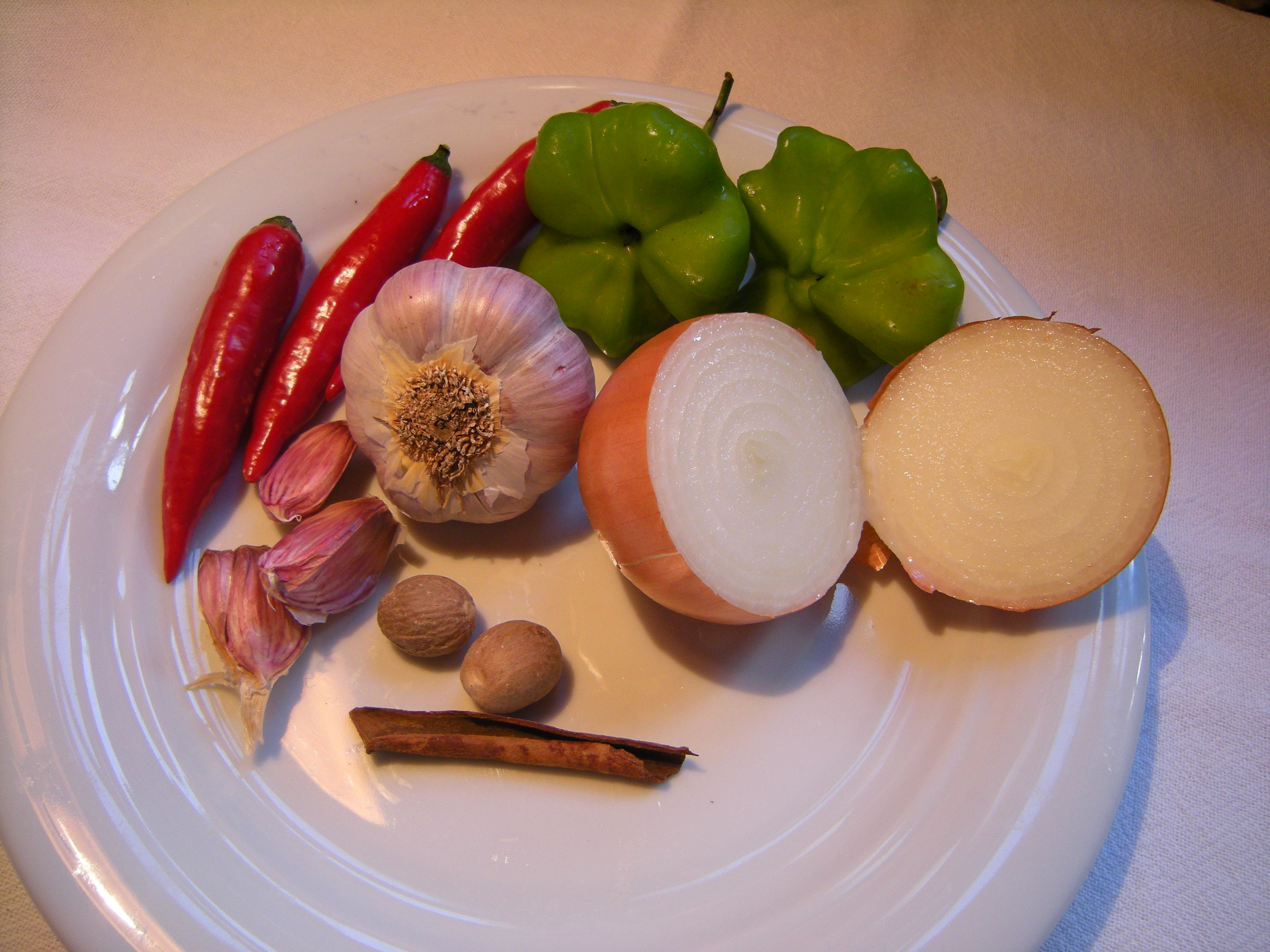
Condiments

1. The pungents – onions, shallots, garlic, chives, and horseradish.
2. Hot condiments – mustard, gherkins, capers, English sauces, such as Worcestershire sauce, ketchup, etc. and American sauces such as chili sauce, Tabasco, etc.; the wines used in reductions and braisings; the finishing elements of sauces and soups.
3. Fatty substances – most animal fats, butter, vegetable greases (edible oils and margarine).

== Non-culinary uses ==
Seasonings have also been used for non-culinary purposes throughout history. Cinnamon, for example, was widely utilized in the production of Kyphi, a perfume used in ancient Egypt. Other herbs and spices have also been used in a variety of historical medicinal treatments, such as those described in Ebers Papyrus.

== See also ==
- Condiment
- Flavoring
- List of culinary herbs and spices
- List of spice mixes
- Popcorn seasoning
