= List of culinary knife cuts =

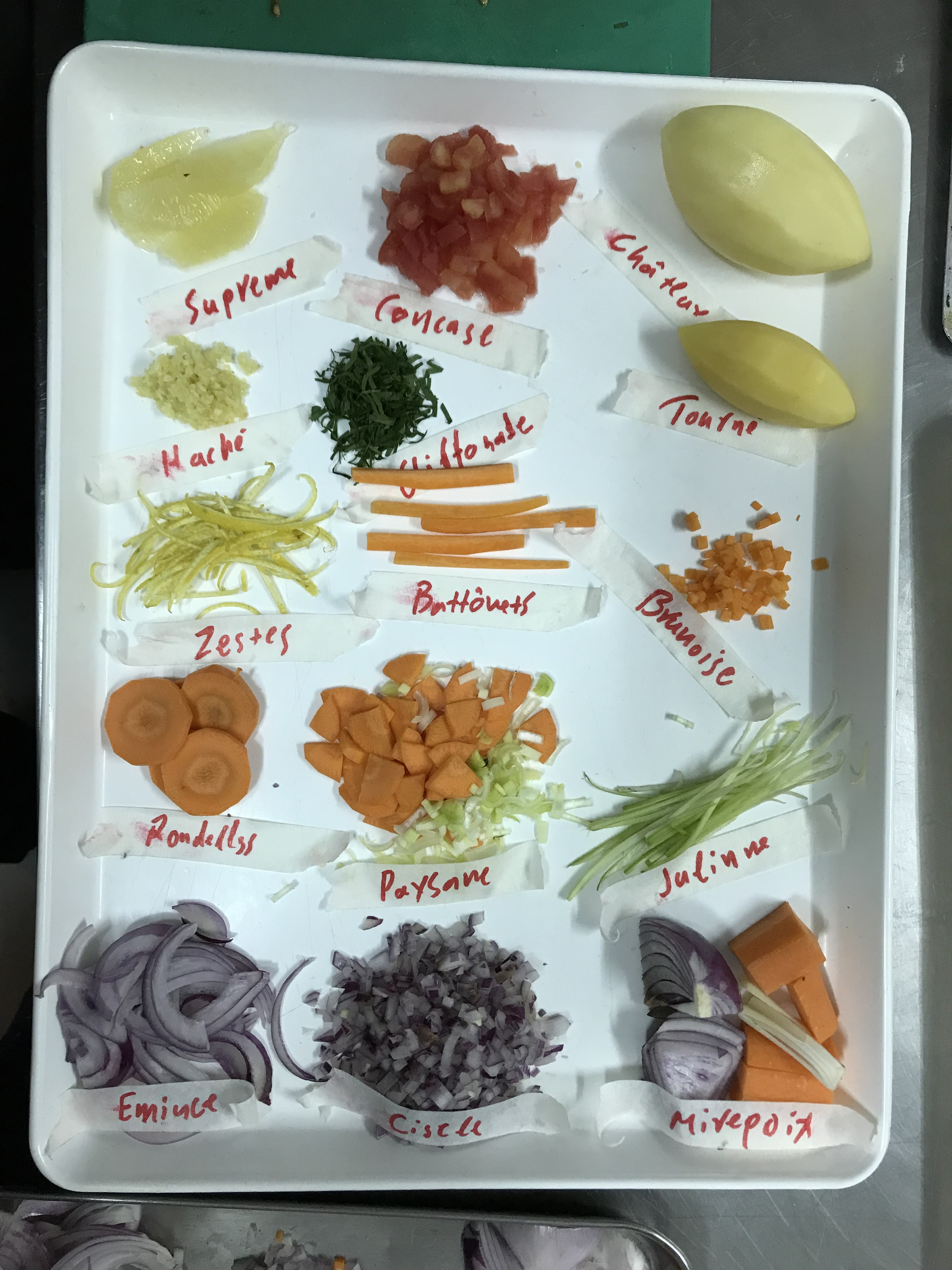
Numerous knife cuts with their corresponding French name

There are a number of regular knife cuts that are used in many recipes, each producing a standardized cut piece of food. The two basic shapes are the strip and the cube.

== Strip cuts ==
- Pont-neuf; used for fried potatoes ("thick cut" or "steak cut" chips), pont-neuf measures from 1/3 by 1/3 by 2 1/2 inches (1 cm × 1 cm × 6 cm) to 3/4 by 3/4 by 3 inches (2 cm × 2 cm × 8 cm)
- Batonnet; French for "little stick", the batonnet measures approximately 1/4 by 1/4 by 2–2 1/2 inches (0.6 cm × 0.6 cm × 5 cm–6 cm). It is also the starting point for the small dice.
- Julienne; referred to as the allumette (or matchstick) when used on potatoes, the julienne measures approximately 1/8 by 1/8 by 1–2 inches (0.3 cm × 0.3 cm × 3 cm–5 cm). It is also the starting point for the brunoise cut.
- Fine julienne; measures approximately 1/16 by 1/16 by 1–2 inches (0.2 cm × 0.2 cm × 3 cm–5 cm), and is the starting point for the fine brunoise cut.
- Chiffonade; rolling leafy greens and slicing the roll in sections from 4–10mm in width

== Cube cuts ==
Cuts with six even sides include:

- Large dice; (or "Carré" meaning "square" in French); sides measuring approximately 3/4 inch (20 mm)
- Medium dice; (Parmentier); sides measuring approximately 1/2 inch (13 mm)
- Small dice; (Macédoine); sides measuring approximately 1/4 inch (5 mm)
- Brunoise; sides measuring approximately 1/8 inch (3 mm)
- Fine brunoise; sides measuring approximately 1/16 inch (2 mm)

== Other cuts ==
Other cuts include:

- Paysanne; 1/2 by 1/2 by 1/8 inch (10 mm × 10 mm × 3 mm)
- Butterflying; is a way of preparing meat, fish, or poultry for cooking by cutting it almost in two, but leaving the two parts connected; it is then often boned and flattened.
- Lozenge; diamond shape, 1/2 by 1/2 by 1/8 inch (10 mm × 10 mm × 3 mm)
- Fermière; cut lengthwise and then sliced to desired thickness 1/8–1/2 inch (3–10 mm)
- Rondelle; cylindrical vegetables cut to discs of desired thickness 1/8–1/2 inch (3–10 mm)
- Oblique; triangle-shaped cuts made by rolling cylindrical items 180° in between bias cuts
- Tourné; 2 inches (50 mm) long with seven faces usually with a bulge in the center portion
- Mirepoix; 3/16–1/4 inch (5–7 mm)
- Rough Cut; chopped more or less randomly resulting in a variety of sizes and shapes
- Mincing; very finely divided into uniform pieces
- Wedges; round vegetables cut equally radially, used on tomato, potato, lemon, cut into four or six pieces or more

Japanese cuts include:

- Tanzaku-kiri (短冊切り); sliced into thin rectangular strips.
- Hira-Zukuri (平造り), is the standard cut for most sashimi. Typically this style of cut is the size of a domino and 10 mm (^{3}/_{8} in) thick.
- Usu-Zukuri (薄造り; lit. 'thin slice'), is an extremely thin, diagonally cut slice that is mostly used to cut firm fish, such as bream, whiting, and flounder. The dimensions of this cut are usually 50 mm (2 in) long and 2 mm (^{1}/_{16} in) wide.
- Kaku-Zukuri (角造り; lit. 'square slice'), is the style in which sashimi is cut into small cubes that are 20 mm (^{3}/_{4} in) on each side.
- Ito-Zukuri (糸造り; lit. 'thread slice'), is the style in which the fish is cut into fine strips, less than 2 mm (^{1}/_{16} in) in diameter. The fish typically cut with the ito-zukuri style include garfish and squid.
- Wa-giri (輪切り); round cut, cut into round slices.
- Hangetsu-giri (半月切り); half-moon cut, cut into round slices which are cut in half.
- Naname-giri (斜め切り); diagonal cut, cut at a 45-degree angle to make oval slices.
- Icho-giri (いちょう切り); ginkgo leaf cut, cut into round slices which are cut into quarters.
- Koguchigiri (小口切り); small edge cuts into tiny round slices.
- Kushigatagiri (くし型切り); wedge cut or comb cut.
- Kakugiri (角切り); cut into cubes.
- Sainome-kiri (さいの目切り); cut into small cubes.
- Arare-kiri (あられ切り); cut into small cubes of 5 millimeters in size.
- Butsugiri (ぶつ切り); chunk cut, cut into chunks of 3-4 centimeters in size.
- Usugiri (薄い切り); cut into thin slices.
- Ran-giri (乱切り); diagonal cut into pieces of 1/2 inch in size.
- Hitokuchi-dai-ni-kiri (一口大に切る); cut into bite-size pieces.
