= List of Spring Baking Championship episodes =

This is a list of episodes for Spring Baking Championship. The series has been presented by Bobby Deen (seasons 1–2), Ali Khan (seasons 4 and 7), Clinton Kelly (seasons 5–6), Molly Yeh (season 8) and Jesse Palmer (seasons 3, 9–11). With the judges Duff Goldman (seasons 1+), Nancy Fuller (seasons 1+), Lorraine Pascal (seasons 1–6) and Kardea Brown (seasons 7+).

== Series overview ==
Season	Episodes	Originally released	
Season	Episodes	First released	Last released
1	6	April 26, 2015	May 31, 2015
2	6	April 10, 2016	May 15, 2016
3	7	March 12, 2017	April 9, 2017
4	8	March 12, 2018	April 30, 2018
5	8	March 18, 2019	May 6, 2019
6	9	March 9, 2020	May 4, 2020
7	10	February 22, 2021	April 26, 2021
8	10	February 28, 2022	May 2, 2022
9	10	March 6, 2023	May 8, 2023
10	11	March 4, 2024	May 6, 2024
11	11	March 10, 2025	May 16, 2025

== Season 1 (2015) ==
There are 8 professional and home bakers competing in a 6-episode baking tournament. One person is eliminated every week until the last episode where the final three compete for the grand prize of $50,000.

Episodes
No. overall	No. in season	Title	Original release date
1	1	"Spring Bounty"	April 26, 2015
Preliminary Heat: Bake a dozen cupcakes inspired by flowers, in 75 minutes. All the cupcakes will be featured in Food Network magazine May issue. Winner: Dwayne (His advantage was exclusive first pick of fruit in the next round.) Main Heat: The contestants have 75 minutes to bake a fresh fruit upside down cake. Dwayne's advantage allowed him to choose pineapple for his cake. and it was off-limits for every other baker. Winner: Dwayne Ingraham Eliminated: Chris Taylor
2	2	"Sweet and Tart"	May 3, 2015
Preliminary Heat: Make a dessert in 1 hour that highlights honey, and it must be the only sweetener used. Simone used rosemary honey, Dwayne used orange blossom honey, Damiano used acacia honey, Juliana used orange blossom honey & white clover honey, Kristine used avocado honey & wildflower honey, Sandy used avocado honey & clover honey, Andy used orange blossom honey & acacia honey. Winner: Dwayne (His advantage was 10 minutes of help from judge Lorraine Pascale.) Main Heat: The bakers have 90 minutes to make two desserts; one featuring lemon and one featuring lime. Winner: Damiano Carrara Eliminated: Kristine de la Cruz
3	3	"Mother's Day"	May 10, 2015
Preliminary Heat: Bake a dessert highlighting coffee and cream in 1 hour, meant to honor mother's day. Winner: Andy (His advantage was exclusive use of special ingredients for the next round.) Main Heat: The contestants have 90 minutes to make a mother's day brunch featuring one sweet and one savory baked dish (quiche was off-limits as a savory dish). Winner: Simone Faure Eliminated: Juliana Evans
4	4	"Birthday Blast"	May 17, 2015
Preliminary Heat: Make a dessert on a stick in 1 hour. Winner: Damiano (His advantage was being able to use his own ice cream machine in the next round.) Main Heat: The bakers have 2 hours to make a birthday cake and ice cream. While Damiano got his own ice cream machine, the other four bakers had to share a separate machine. Winner: Damiano Carrara Eliminated: Sandy Hunter
5	5	"Memorial Day Madness"	May 25, 2015
Preliminary Heat: Make a pie fit for a picnic in 90 minutes. Winner: Dwayne (His advantage was a 10-minute head start in the main round.) Main Heat: The contestants have 90 minutes to make a patriotic dessert featuring the colors red, white, and blue. Winner: Andy Chlebana Eliminated: Simone Faure
6	6	"Wedding Season"	May 31, 2015
Preliminary Heat: Make three different wedding inspired baked goods for a dessert bar in 3 hours. Winner: Andy (His advantage was assigning the cake flavors in the final round.) Main Heat: The final three have 4 hours to make a spring wedding cake using one of the judges' favorite cake flavors. Andy chose vanilla (Nancy's favorite flavor). He gave Dwayne chocolate (Duff's favorite flavor). And he gave Damiano lemon (Lorraine's favorite flavor). Winner of $50,000: Andy Chlebana Eliminated: Damiano Carrara & Dwayne Ingraham

=== Contestants ===
- 1st – Andy Chlebana, Pastry Instructor from Plainfield, Illinois
- 2nd/3rd – Damiano Carrara, Bakery Owner & Pastry Chef from Moorpark, California
- 2nd/3rd – Dwayne Ingraham, Executive Pastry Chef from Oxford, Mississippi
- 4th – Simone Faure, Bakery Owner from St. Louis, Missouri
- 5th – Sandy Hunter, Assistant Pastry Chef from Chicago, Illinois
- 6th – Juliana Evans, Stay-at-Home Mom from Orlando, Florida
- 7th – Kristine de la Cruz, Bakery Owner from Los Angeles, California
- 8th – Chris Taylor, Epidemiologist from Atlanta, Georgia

=== Elimination Table ===
Place	Contestant	Episode					
Place	Contestant	1	2	3	4	5	6
1	Andy	IN	LOW	IN‡	HIGH	WIN	WINNER‡
2	Damiano	HIGH	WIN	IN	WIN‡	LOW	RUNNER-UP
2	Dwayne	WIN‡	IN‡	HIGH	LOW	HIGH‡	RUNNER-UP
4	Simone	HIGH	IN	WIN	IN	OUT	
5	Sandy	IN	HIGH	LOW	OUT		
6	Juliana	LOW	IN	OUT			
7	Kristine	LOW	OUT				
8	Chris	OUT					

(WINNER) The contestant won the competition.
(RUNNER-UP) The contestant made it to the finale, but did not win.
(WIN) The contestant won the challenge for that week.
(HIGH) The contestant was one of the selection committee's favorites for that week.
(IN) The contestant performed well enough to move on to the next week.
(LOW) The contestant was one of the selection committee's two or three least favorites for that week, but was not eliminated.
(OUT) The contestant was the selection committee's least favorite for that week, and was eliminated.

== Season 2 (2016) ==
Eight professional and home bakers come to compete in a six-episode baking tournament. This season is the last season with Bobby Deen as host. This season also began the mid-round twists in main heat challenges that are a staple of other baking championships competitions.

Episodes
No. overall	No. in season	Title	Original release date
7	1	"Berry Naked"	April 10, 2016
Preliminary Heat: Make an inventive shortcake in 1 hour without using any kind of berries. Susana Mijares suffered a fairly deep cut that caused her to miss the pre-heat but she returned in time to compete in the main heat. Winner: Dan (His advantage was exclusive use of his berry of choice in the main heat.) Main Heat: The competing bakers have 2 hours to make a tiered, naked cake featuring berries. Dan's advantage made it so he was the only one who could use strawberries in his naked cake. The mid-round twist is to add key limes to their cakes. Winner: Susana Mijares (she had an advantage next episode; the first and only carry-over advantage one of the series thus far.) Eliminated: Najie Mercedes
8	2	"Great Outdoors"	April 17, 2016
Preliminary Heat: Make a dessert, inspired by classic ballpark treats, in 1 hour. For having best dish in the previous episode's main heat, Susana got to assign the baseball snacks to her contestants. She chose pretzels for herself and gave popcorn to Kenny, root beer to Dustin, peanuts to William, sweet potato fries to Jane, tortilla chips to Audrey, and churros to Dan. Winner: Audrey (Her advantage was assigning the barbecue dish themes in the main heat.) Main Heat: The competitors have 2 hours to make barbecue dessert imposters. Audrey picked ribs and corn on the cob to recreate as a dessert. Susana was assigned chicken legs & coleslaw. Jane was assigned lamb chops and grilled vegetables. Dan was assigned t-bone steak & 3-bean salad. Kenny was assigned salmon and grilled asparagus. Dustin was assigned grilled shrimp and pasta salad. And William was assigned sausage and potato salad. Winner: Audrey McGinnis Eliminated: Dustin Charbonneau
9	3	"Bake the Rainbow"	April 24, 2016
Preliminary Heat: Make a dessert fondue, including something to dip into it, in 45 minutes. Winner: Jane (Her advantage was a ten-minute head start in the second round.) Main Heat: The bakers must create a rainbow dessert featuring five different colors (red, orange, yellow, green, & blue). Jane had a full two hours while the others had 1 hour and 50 minutes. The mid-round twist is to add the color black to their desserts. Winner: Jane Soudah Eliminated: William Poole
10	4	"Sweet Toothed Farmer"	May 1, 2016
Preliminary Heat: Make a dessert, in 1 hour, using a specific farmstand vegetable. Kenny got beets, Audrey got fennel, Jane got summer squash, Susana got zucchini, Dan got tomatoes. Winner: Jane (Her advantage was access to precooked bacon and bacon fat in the main round) Main Heat: The competitors have 90 minutes to bake a dessert that features bacon and eggs. The mid-round twist is to add coffee flavor into the desserts. Winner: Dan Langan Eliminated: Audrey McGinnis
11	5	"Moms Love Chocolate"	May 8, 2016
Preliminary Heat: Make a mother's day dessert in 1 hour inspired by gift boxes chosen at random. Susana got a coffee mug, Dan got a bracelet, Jane got a purse, and Kenny got perfume. Duff's mother, Jackie Winch, helped judge this round. Winner: Kenny (His advantage was 10 minutes of help from Damiano Carrara, the runner-up from the previous season.) Main Heat: The bakers had to pair an unusual ingredient with chocolate and they had 90 minutes to bake it. Dan got Gorgonzola cheese, Jane got aromatic bitters, Kenny got Earl Gray tea, and Susana got curry powder. The mid-round twist is to add sugar work to their desserts. Winner: Jane Soudah Eliminated: Kenny Magana
12	6	"Destination Wedding"	May 15, 2016
Preliminary Heat: Make the ultimate groomsmen welcome basket in 90 minutes. The basket must feature two sweet treats and one savory snack. The mid-twist is to add bourbon to one of their treats. Winner: Jane (Her advantage was the ability to assign destination themes in the final round.) Main Heat: The final three have five hours to make a wedding cake based on a travel destination. Jane got to assign the destination theme for the cakes; she chose Hawaii and assigned Mexico to Dan and Italy to Susana. Winner of $50,000: Jane Soudah Eliminated: Susana Mijares and Dan Langan

=== Contestants ===
- 1st – Jane Soudah, Pastry Chef from South Pasadena, California
- 2nd/3rd – Dan Langan, Personal Trainer from Havertown, Pennsylvania
- 2nd/3rd – Susana Mijares, Bakery Owner from San Antonio, Texas
- 4th – Kenny Magana, Pastry Research & Development from Reading, Pennsylvania
- 5th – Audrey McGinnis, Home Caterer from Frisco, Texas
- 6th – William "Will" Poole, Pastry Chef from New Ipswich, New Hampshire
- 7th – Dustin Charbonneau, Executive Pastry Chef from Chicago, Illinois
- 8th – Najie Mercedes, Pastry Chef from Miami, Florida

=== Elimination Table ===
Place	Contestant	Episode					
Place	Contestant	1	2	3	4	5	6
1	Jane	IN	HIGH	WIN‡	IN‡	WIN	WINNER‡
2	Dan	HIGH‡	IN	IN	WIN	LOW	RUNNER-UP
2	Susana	WIN	IN	IN	LOW	HIGH	RUNNER-UP
4	Kenny	IN	IN	HIGH	HIGH	OUT‡	
5	Audrey	LOW	WIN‡	LOW	OUT		
6	Will	IN	LOW	OUT			
7	Dustin	IN	OUT				
8	Najie	OUT					

(WINNER) The contestant won the competition.
(RUNNER-UP) The contestant made it to the finale, but did not win.
‡ The contestant won the Preheat challenge for that week.
(WIN) The contestant won the Main Heat challenge for that week.
(HIGH) The contestant was one of the selection committee's favorites for that week.
(IN) The contestant performed well enough to move on to the next week.
(LOW) The contestant was one of the selection committee's three or four least favorites for that week, but was not eliminated.
(OUT) The contestant was the selection committee's least favorite for that week, and was eliminated.

== Season 3 (2017) ==
This season featured nine professional and home bakers competing in a seven-episode baking tournament with a grand prize of $50,000. The season premiere aired the first and second episodes together. The last two episodes aired as a two=hour finale. Jesse Palmer replaced Bobby Deen as host for this season.

Episodes
No. overall	No. in season	Title	Original release date
13	1	"Easter Treats"	March 12, 2017
Preliminary Heat: Make a decorative treat shaped like an egg, as well as an edible nest to hold the dessert egg, all in 90 minutes. Winner: Heather (Her advantage was exclusive use of a cake flavor in the second round.) Main Heat: The bakers had three hours to make a bunny cake. For her advantage, Heather chose to make a chocolate cake and none of the other cakes could use that flavor. The mid-round twist is to make a dozen baby bunny cupcakes to complement their bunny cake. Winner: Fausto Barragan Eliminated: Mark Heyward-Washington
14	2	"Sweet Vacations"	March 12, 2017
Preliminary Heat: Pairing up into teams, the contestants have 90 minutes to make tropical themed deserts based on the fruit written on a slip of paper inside a souvenir tiki mug. Courtney & John got "banana", Jordan & Fausto got "mango", Adam & Daniela got "key lime", and Heather and Samirah got "pineapple". Winners: Adam & Daniela (Their advantage was first choice of destination theme in the main heat.) Main Heat: The contestants had 2 hours to make a dozen vacation doughnuts inspired by a vacation destination blindly chosen from luggage tags. Adam chose "NYC Adventure", Daniela chose "Amusement Park", Heather chose "Vegas Getaway", Fausto chose "Poolside Resort", Samirah chose "Mountain Retreat", Courtney chose "Spring Cruise", John chose "Beachcomber's Dream", and Jordan chose "Whitewater Rafting". The mid-round twist is to bake an additional half dozen doughnut holes, decorated to fit their theme. Winner: Courtney Rezendes Eliminated: Samirah Williams
15	3	"Derby Desserts"	March 19, 2017
Preliminary Heat: Make a mint julep inspired dessert in one hour. Winner: Fausto (His advantage was a five-minute head start in the second round.) Main Heat: The bakers had 85 minutes (Fausto had 90 minutes) to make springtime cookie garlands containing three different types of cookies. The mid-round twist is to incorporate a rose element, in honor of the "Run for the Roses" horse-racing theme of the show. Winner: Jordan Pilarski Eliminated: Heather Walker
16	4	"Springtime Remodeling"	March 26, 2017
Preliminary Heat: In one hour, make a brownie that has been given a springtime "remodel" Winner: Adam (His advantage was the ability to assign flavored liqueurs in the mid-round twist.) Main Heat: The contestants had 90 minutes to re-imagine a classic French Napoleon pastry as a springtime dessert. The mid-round twist is to incorporate a flavored liqueur into the desserts. Adam chose cherry liqueur, then assigned raspberry to Jordan, almond to John, orange to Courtney, lemon to Daniela, and elderflower to Fausto. Winner: Daniela Copenhaver Eliminated: Fausto Barragan
17	5	"Momcentric"	April 2, 2017
Preliminary Heat: Make a mother's day fruit tart in 1 hour and write (and recite) a short poem dedicated to their mother. Winner: Adam (His advantage was first pick of dessert themes in the second round.) Main Heat: The bakers had 90 minutes to modernize an old-fashioned dessert. For his advantage, Adam got to choose first from a set of predetermined desserts, then he chose who would get to pick next. Adam chose peach cobbler, then John chose bread pudding, Courtney chose chocolate cream pie, Daniela chose pineapple upside down cake, and Jordan ended up with lemon meringue. The mid-round twist is to add maraschino cherries into their modernized desserts. Winner: Jordan Pilarski Eliminated: Courtney Rezendes
18	6	"Rainy Day Sweets"	April 9, 2017
Preliminary Heat: Make a dozen whoopie pie garden "critters" in one hour. The types of critters were written down on garden markers: John grabbed "butterflies", Jordan grabbed "bumblebees", Daniela grabbed "caterpillars", and Adam grabbed "ladybugs". Winner: Daniela (Her advantage was 10 minutes of help from Jane Soudah, the winner of the previous season) Main Heat: The contestants had to make a drip cake, in 90 minutes, in homage to spring rains. The mid-round twist is to make a 3-D, edible rainbow to put atop their cakes. Winner: Daniela Copenhaver Eliminated: John Reed
19	7	"Memorial Day Delights"	April 9, 2017
Preliminary Heat: Make three Memorial Day picnic items ‒ two sweet and one savory ‒ in two hours. Winner: Jordan (His advantage was exclusive use of special star molds and cutters in the final round.) Main Heat: The final three have five hours to make an American flag dessert in honor of Memorial Day. Winner of $50,000: Jordan Pilarski Eliminated: Adam Young & Daniela Copenhaver

=== Contestants ===
- 1st – Jordan Pilarski, Pastry Chef from Amelia Island, Florida
- 2nd/3rd – Adam Young, Bakery Owner and Head Pastry Chef from Mystic, Connecticut
- 2nd/3rd – Daniela Copenhaver, Online Caterer & Baker from Chula Vista, California
- 4th – John Reed, Bakery owner from Shamong Township, New Jersey
- 5th – Courtney Rezendes, Culinary Instructor from Fall River, Massachusetts
- 6th – Fausto Barragan, School Principal from La Puente, California
- 7th – Heather Walker, Home Baker from Scottsdale, Arizona
- 8th – Samirah Williams, Boutique bakery owner from Philadelphia, Pennsylvania
- 9th – Mark Heyward-Washington, Pastry Chef from Charleston, South Carolina

=== Elimination Table ===
Place	Contestant	Episode						
Place	Contestant	1	2	3	4	5	6	7
1	Jordan	HIGH	IN	WIN	LOW	WIN	LOW	WINNER‡
2	Adam	IN	IN‡	IN	HIGH‡	IN‡	LOW	RUNNER-UP
2	Daniela	IN	LOW‡	IN	WIN	HIGH	WIN‡	RUNNER-UP
4	John	LOW	IN	HIGH	IN	LOW	OUT	
5	Courtney	IN	WIN	IN	IN	OUT		
6	Fausto	WIN	IN	LOW‡	OUT			
7	Heather	IN‡	HIGH	OUT				
8	Samirah	IN	OUT					
9	Mark	OUT						

(WINNER) The contestant won the competition.
(RUNNER-UP) The contestant made it to the finale, but did not win.
‡ The contestant won the Preheat challenge for that week.
(WIN) The contestant won the Main Heat challenge for that week.
(HIGH) The contestant was one of the selection committee's favorites for that week.
(IN) The contestant performed well enough to move on to the next week.
(LOW) The contestant was one of the selection committee's least favorites for that week, but was not eliminated.
(OUT) The contestant was the selection committee's least favorite for that week, and was eliminated.

^Note 1: The Preheat challenge in the second episode was a team challenge; Adam and Daniela thus won as a team.

== Season 4 (2018) ==
This season featured the most bakers to this point, with 10 contestants (including a baker from Canada) competing in an eight-episode baking tournament for a chance at $50,000. Ali Kahn took over as host.

Episodes
No. overall	No. in season	Title	Original release date
20	1	"Spring Colorburst"	March 12, 2018
Preliminary Heat: Make a mini tie-dye cheesecake, in 90 minutes, featuring a fruit chosen from a stand (Aaron got mango, Cristina got blueberry, Deepal got rhubarb, Caleb got cherry, Ruby got strawberry, Nacho got fig, Jessica got plum, Heather got peach, Michelle got raspberry, Andrew got nectarine). Winner: Cristina (Her advantage was picking her herb and color in the main heat.) Main Heat: They had 2 hours to make naked ombre cakes and they had to pick from a group of herbs and colors. Cristina chose rosemary and the color blue that paired with it. Deepal got sage & the color blue. Ruby got sorrel and the color purple. Aaron got parsley and the color green. Michelle got coriander and the color red. Caleb got fennel and the color orange. Heather got thyme and the color purple. Jessica got mint and the color green. Andrew got basil and the color red. Nacho got lavender and the color orange. The mid-round twist is to make a 3-D chocolate decoration for their cake. Winner: Aaron McInnis Eliminated: Michelle Kaiser
21	2	"Blooming Delicious"	March 19, 2018
Preliminary Heat: Make flower arrangement cupcakes in 90 minutes that incorporate a special flower essence. Nacho got hibiscus, Cristina got rose, Aaron got orange blossom, Caleb got honeysuckle, Ruby got magnolia, Jessica got lavender, Andrew got elderflower, Heather got violet, Deepal got jasmine. Winner: Cristina (Her advantage was exclusive use of special decorations and stencils in the second round.) Main Heat: They had 2 hours to make edible, mirror-glazed gazing balls. The mid-round twist is to add an edible garden gnome. Winner: Ruby Bloch Eliminated: Andrew Belen
22	3	"A Perfect Spring Day"	March 26, 2018
Preliminary Heat: Pairing up into teams, the contestants have 90 minutes to make a dozen mini pies that correspond with a pie filling they picked from a table with four pie tins. Caleb & Heather got "nut", Nacho & Ruby got "cream", Aaron & Cristina got "fruit", and Deepal and Jessica got "custard". Winners: Nacho & Ruby (Their advantage was a 10-minute head start in round 2.) Main Heat: Each round 1 duo had to grab a picnic basket and use the three ingredients inside to make cohesive desserts in 90 minutes (Ruby & Nacho got 100 minutes). They couldn't make the same dessert. Ruby & Nacho's basket contained peaches, potato chips, and salami. Caleb & Heather's basket contained cucumbers, red bell peppers, and yogurt dip. Deepal and Jessica's basket contained watermelon, prosciutto, and olives. Aaron & Cristina's basket contained breadsticks, goat cheese and mushrooms. The mid-round twist is to add ice cream that complements both duos' desserts. Winner: Caleb Fischer Eliminated: Deepal Patel
23	4	"Spring Eggspressions"	April 2, 2018
Preliminary Heat: Make one dozen springtime éclairs in 90 minutes using a "spring theme" found in one of several plastic eggs hidden around the kitchen. Heather's theme was "honeybees", Aaron's theme was "sunshine", Nacho's theme was "rainbows", Caleb's theme was "palm trees", Ruby's theme was "spring greens", Cristina's theme was "cherry blossoms", and Jessica's theme was "wild flowers". Winner: Cristina (Her advantage was not having to use hard boiled eggs in the second round.) Main Heat: The bakers have 2 hours to create edible baskets filled with two different baked treats. One of the desserts must incorporate hard boiled eggs. The mid-round twist is for each baker to pick a jelly bean flavor and use it in one of their treats. Ruby got tangerine, Jessica got black licorice, Aaron got coconut, Caleb got blueberry, Heather got green apple, Cristina got pineapple, and Nacho got cinnamon. Winner: Caleb Fischer Eliminated: Jessica Duggan
24	5	"Berrylicious"	April 9, 2018
Preliminary Heat: Choose a berry from a table display and make a dozen tiny desserts in 1 hour. Heather grabbed blueberries. Caleb grabbed golden berries. Cristina grabbed raspberries. Ruby grabbed huckleberries. Aaron grabbed strawberries. Nacho grabbed blackberries. Winner: Ruby (Her advantage was 10 minutes of help from Jordan Pilarski, the winner of the previous season) Main Heat: The contestants had 2 hours to make spring pattern roll cakes with a different kind of berry than they used in the pre-heat. Caleb used huckleberries. Ruby used golden berries. Heather used strawberries. Aaron used blueberries. Nacho used raspberries. Cristina used blackberries. The mid-round twist is making a half dozen patterned cookies to join their cake. Winner: Nacho Aguirre Eliminated: Ruby Bloch
25	6	"Desert Desserts"	April 16, 2018
Preliminary Heat: With agave syrup as the only sweetener, the contestants have 90 minutes to make desert themed desserts. Written on the back of cacti, each baker must pick a plant and make a different dessert: Heather must make a flourless cake, Aaron must make an ice cream sandwich, Caleb must make cupcakes, Cristina must make doughnuts, and Nacho must make a tart. Winner: Cristina (Her advantage was assigning dry ingredients in the second round.) Main Heat: The bakers had 2 hours to make succulent themed cakes and they had to include a specific dry ingredient, as assigned to them by Cristina. She picked pink peppercorn then assigned caraway seeds to Aaron, sesame seeds to Caleb, black pepper to Nacho, and anise seeds to Heather. The mid-round twist is to incorporate prickly pears into the cakes. Winner: Heather Wong Eliminated: Aaron McInnis
26	7	"Seasons Change"	April 23, 2018
Preliminary Heat: Make a dessert combining avocado and another ingredient on display, all in 1 hour. Heather picked oranges, Cristina picked chocolate, Nacho picked limes, and Caleb picked ginger. Winner: Nacho (His advantage was being able to switch desserts with one of his contestants.) Main Heat: The contestants had 90 minutes to "spring-ify" a winter dessert chosen blindly from warm weather props. Nacho initially got pecan pie but he traded it for Cristina's bread pudding. Heather got pumpkin pie and Caleb got peppermint swirl brownies. The mid-round twist is to add coffee to their dessert. Winner: Nacho Aguirre Eliminated: Heather Wong
27	8	"Hidden Beauty"	April 30, 2018
Preliminary Heat: They had 90 minutes to combine two unusual, "ugly" fruits into one dessert. Caleb combined finger limes with dragon fruit. Cristina combined jackfruit and rambutan. Nacho combined cherimoya with African horned melon. Winner: Cristina (Her advantage was assigning the colors in the second round.) Main Heat: The final three have 5 hours to make a geode cake, including the sugar crystals, from scratch. Cristina chose blue for her candy geode color and assigned amber to Caleb and purple to Nacho. Winner of $50,000: Nacho Aguirre^{1} Eliminated: Cristina Vazquez & Caleb Fischer

^Note 1: Winner Nacho Aguirre is married to Susana Mijares who was a finalist in season 2 of Spring Baking Championship

=== Contestants ===
- 1st – Nacho Aguirre, Chef and Owner from San Antonio, Texas
- 2nd/3rd – Caleb Fischer, Chef de Cuisine from Auburn, Alabama
- 2nd/3rd – Cristina Vazquez, Pastry Cook from Fair Lawn, New Jersey
- 4th – Heather Wong, Pastry Chef from Burbank, California
- 5th – Aaron McInnis, Nutritionist from Newfoundland, Canada
- 6th – Ruby Bloch, Baker from New Orleans, Louisiana
- 7th – Jessica Duggan, Home Baker from Puyallup, Washington
- 8th – Deepal Patel, Senior Pastry Chef from Kansas City, Missouri
- 9th – Andrew Belen, Baker from Chicago, Illinois
- 10th – Michelle Kaiser, Bakery Owner from Omaha, Nebraska

=== Elimination Table ===
Place	Contestant	Episode							
Place	Contestant	1	2	3	4	5	6	7	8
1	Nacho	HIGH	IN	LOW‡	HIGH	WIN	LOW	WIN‡	WINNER
2	Caleb	IN	IN	WIN	WIN	IN	IN	LOW	RUNNER-UP
2	Cristina	LOW‡	IN‡	IN	IN‡	LOW	HIGH‡	IN	RUNNER-UP‡
4	Heather	IN	IN	HIGH	LOW	HIGH	WIN	OUT	
5	Aaron	WIN	HIGH	IN	IN	IN	OUT		
6	Ruby	IN	WIN	IN‡	IN	OUT‡			
7	Jessica	IN	LOW	IN	OUT				
8	Deepal	HIGH	IN	OUT					
9	Andrew	IN	OUT						
10	Michelle	OUT							

(WINNER) The contestant won the competition.
(RUNNER-UP) The contestant made it to the finale, but did not win.
‡ The contestant won the Preheat challenge for that week.
(WIN) The contestant won the Main Heat challenge for that week.
(HIGH) The contestant was one of the selection committee's favorites for that week.
(IN) The contestant performed well enough to move on to the next week.
(LOW) The contestant was one of the selection committee's three or four least favorites for that week, but was not eliminated.
(OUT) The contestant was the selection committee's least favorite for that week, and was eliminated.

^Note 2: The Preheat challenge in the third episode was a team challenge so Nacho and Ruby won as a team.

== Season 5 (2019) ==
Air Dates: March 18 – May 6, 2019. Ten contestants competed in this season for $25,000 (half the prize money of past seasons) and a feature in Food Network Magazine. The new host of this season is Clinton Kelly.

Episodes
No. overall	No. in season	Title	Original release date
28	1	"Spring Has Sprung"	March 18, 2019
Preliminary Heat: Bake a dozen spring animal donuts in 90 minutes. Each contestant grabbed an animal cutout that they would base their doughnut on. Cory got "swan", Marqessa got "skunk", Kendra got "porcupine", Jordan got "fox", Jessica got "white-tailed deer", Riccardo got "black bear", Saber got "chipmunk", Karina got "otter", Kevin got "beaver", and Tracey got "raccoon". Winner: Riccardo (His advantage was first choice of cake ingredient in the second round.) Main Heat: The contestants had 2 hours to make a watercolor cake that showcases a chosen ingredient. Roccardo got to choose first and went with strawberries. Jessica chose cherries, Cory chose fennel, Saber chose apricots. Marqessa chose carrots, Jordan chose fennel, Tracey chose carrots, Kevin chose apricots, Karina chose strawberries, Kendra chose cherries. The mid-round twist was to add a three dimensional representation of their chosen fruit or vegetable using a specific edible sculpting material chosen on a first-come, first-serve basis. Jessica and Kendra had to use gum paste, Cory and Jordan had to use fondant, Karina and Tracey had to use marzipan, Riccardo and Marqessa had to use isomalt, Saber and Kevin had to use modeling chocolate. Winner: Tracey Marionneaux Eliminated: Kendra Stephens
29	2	"Spring At The County Fair"	March 25, 2019
Preliminary Heat: Make a pie in 90 minutes by picking a blue ribbon that represents a seasonal ingredient. Every ribbon ended up saying "rhubarb", meaning all the bakers had to make their version of a rhubarb pie. Winner: Saber (His advantage was exclusive use of the popcorn popper and deep fryer.) Main Heat: The bakers had 2 hours to make an oversized dessert inspired by a specifically chosen fair food. Cory got deep fried cookie dough. Marquessa got churros. Jordan got deep fried candy bar. Karina got pecan cinnamon rolls. Jessica got Belgian waffle on a stick. Kevin got funnel cake. Riccardo got caramel apple. Tracey got cheesecake on a stick. Saber got fried peanut butter and jelly sandwich. The mid-round twist was to incorporate chocolate covered bacon. Winner: Cory Barrett Eliminated: Jessica Colvin
30	3	"Spring Dream Teams"	April 1, 2019
Preliminary Heat: Working in teams of 2, the bakers had 90 minutes to combine two baked goods into two dozen mash-up treats. They're paired up via blindly picking envelopes with mash-up suggestions: Tracey & Karina got 'bundt cake + blondie'. Jordan & Marqessa got 'whoopie pie + upside-down cake'. Riccardo & Saber got 'brownie + cupcake'. Cory & Kevin got 'sandwich cookie + muffin'. Winners: Cory & Kevin (Their advantage was being able to switch around any of the teams.) Main Heat: Staying in their teams, the bakers had 2 hours to make 4 cream tart cakes ‒ 2 cakes each with different flavors. The cakes had to be shaped like a different letter and spell a word that reminded them of spring. Tracey & Karina remained a team (their word: "Love") Cory & Kevin also remained a team (their word: "Rain") but they rearranged two teams to pair up Marqessa with Saber (their word "Rose"), and Jordan with Riccardo (their word: "Lush"). The mid-round twist was to incorporate a "superfood" into their cakes. Marqessa & Saber had to add coconut. Tracey & Karina had to add Brazil nuts. Jordan & Riccardo had to add green tea. And Cory & Kevin had to add ginger. Winner: Marqessa Gesualdi Eliminated: Kevin Dillmon
31	4	"Southern Spring Bakeover"	April 8, 2019
Preliminary Heat: Use canned biscuit dough to make one large dessert, or one dozen mini desserts, in 1 hour. The bakers must also incorporate one of three southern beverages. Cory, Jordan, and Tracey got sweet tea. Marqessa and Riccardo got lemonade. Karina and Saber got bourbon. Winner: Cory (His advantage was 10 minutes of help from the season 3 Holiday Baking Championship winner, Jason Smith.) Main Heat: The bakers had 2 hours to give traditional southern cakes a springy makeover. Saber got red velet cake. Karina got a poke cake. Jordan got a lane cake. Marqessa got coconut layer cake. Cory got hummingbird cake. Riccardo got Texas sheet cake. Tracey got a tunnel of fudge cake. The mid-round twist was to incorporate various southern ingredients: Saber grabbed sesame seeds, Marqessa grabbed pickled peaches. Tracey got sorghum molasses. Jordan got pepper jelly. Karina got boiled peanuts. Cory got cola. Riccardo got apple butter. Winner: Saber Rejbi Eliminated: Jordan Kanouse
32	5	"Easter Delights"	April 15, 2019
Preliminary Heat: Bake a gooey marshmallow dessert in 1 hour. The contestants chose colored egg decals out of an Easter basket that would indicate the main color scheme of their dessert. Tracey picked pink, Saber picked yellow, Marqessa picked green, Cory picked orange, Karina picked blue, and Riccardo picked purple. Winner: Karina (Her advantage was assigning the flavors in the second round.) Main Heat: The contestants had 2 hours to make a dessert that looks like an Easter bonnet/hat. They had to incorporate a specific tropical flavor. For her advantage, Karina chose lychee for herself, then assigned pineapple to Riccardo, mango to Cory, key lime to Saber, kiwi to Marqessa, and passionfruit to Tracey. The mid-round twist was to include malted milk ingredients into the desserts. Karina and Cory grabbed chocolate malt balls. Tracey and Saber grabbed malted milk eggs. Marqessa and Riccardo grabbed malted milk powder. Winner: Karina Rivera Eliminated: Marqessa Gesualdi
33	6	"Marvelous Mother Nature"	April 22, 2019
Preliminary Heat: Bake 6 individual walnut and honey desserts, with bee decorations, in 90 minutes. Each baker got to choose a variety of honey from a table: Saber used orange blossom honey, Cory used acacia honey, Karina used clover honey, Tracey used wildflower honey, and Riccardo used heather honey. Winner: Cory (His advantage was exclusive use of special molds and decorating accessories.) Main Heat: The contestants had 2 hours to make an enchanted spring forest cake with berries. The contestants all grabbed cards with different wild berries to use: Karina got huckleberry, Cory got gooseberry, Saber got marionberry, Tracey got boysenberry, and Riccardo got lingonberry. The mid-round twist was to add edible moss to the cakes. Winner: Riccardo Menicucci Eliminated: Tracey Marionneaux
34	7	"Pretty in Pink"	April 29, 2019
Preliminary Heat: Make 6 individual desserts with rose wine and a cheese pairing grabbed from a table, all in 90 minutes. Cory used Manchego, Riccardo used blue cheese, Karina used chevre, and Saber used triple cream brie. Winner: Saber (His advantage was first, and exclusive, choice of 3 pink decorative ingredients for the next round.) Main Heat: The bakers had 2 hours to make an all pink dessert in honor of the "Kentucky Oaks". They grabbed little toy stick horses which highlighted a pink ingredient they had to use in their dessert. Saber got pink pluots, Cory got pink lemons, Riccardo got pink grapefruit, and Karina got pink dragonfruit. The mid-round twist was to add a rose element to their desserts. Winner: Cory Barrett Eliminated: Riccardo Menicucci
35	8	"Mother's Day Party"	May 6, 2019
Preliminary Heat: Make two dozen baked items, two different treats per dozen, inspired by cocktails. They had 2 hours. Cory used mimosa as his inspiration, Saber used mojito, and Karina used mai tai. Winner: Cory (His advantage was first choice of a gift box with coffee flavor in the final round.) Main Heat: The finalists had 5 hours to make cakes inspired by coffee flavors a mother would like, and they had to personalize the cakes by decorating it with a gift their mother of choice would like. For his advantage, Cory chose from three gift boxes and had the option of giving away his first choice if he didn't like it. He picked dirty chai latte and gave it to Karina. His second choice ended up being salted-caramel macchiato. Saber ended up with cafe mocha. For the first time, a finale round of the spring baking championship has a mid-round twist: they had to make an edible box filled with candy. Winner of $25,000: Cory Barrett Eliminated: Karina Rivera & Saber Rejbi

=== Contestants ===
- 1st: Cory Barrett – Culinary Instructor from Kalamazoo, Michigan
- 2nd/3rd: Karina Rivera – Head Pastry Chef from Miami, Florida
- 2nd/3rd: Saber Rejbi – Executive Pastry Chef from Chicago, Illinois
- 4th: Riccardo Menicucci – Executive Pastry Chef from San Francisco, California
- 5th: Tracey Marionneaux – Executive Pastry Chef from Chicago, Illinois
- 6th: Marqessa Gesualdi – Bakery Owner and Pastry Chef from Philadelphia, Pennsylvania
- 7th: Jordan Kanouse – Pastry Chef from New Orleans, Louisiana
- 8th: Kevin Dillmon – Bakery Owner from Rome, Georgia
- 9th: Jessica Colvin – Home Baker from Southlake, Texas
- 10th: Kendra Stephens – Executive Pastry Chef from Washington, DC

=== Elimination Table ===
Place	Contestant	Episode							
Place	Contestant	1	2	3	4	5	6	7	8
1	Cory	LOW	WIN	IN‡	IN‡	IN	HIGH‡	WIN	WINNER‡
2	Karina	HIGH	IN	IN	IN	WIN‡	IN	HIGH	RUNNER-UP
2	Saber	IN	IN‡	HIGH	WIN	HIGH	LOW	LOW‡	RUNNER-UP
4	Riccardo	IN‡	HIGH	IN	HIGH	LOW	WIN	OUT	
5	Tracey	WIN	IN	LOW	IN	IN	OUT		
6	Marqessa	HIGH	IN	WIN	LOW	OUT			
7	Jordan	IN	IN	IN	OUT				
8	Kevin	IN	LOW	OUT‡					
9	Jessica	IN	OUT						
10	Kendra	OUT							

(WINNER) The contestant won the competition.
(RUNNER-UP) The contestant made it to the finale, but did not win.
‡ The contestant won the Preheat challenge for that week.
(WIN) The contestant won the Main Heat challenge for that week.
(HIGH) The contestant was one of the selection committee's favorites for that week.
(IN) The contestant performed well enough to move on to the next week.
(LOW) The contestant was one of the selection committee's three or four least favorites for that week, but was not eliminated.
(OUT) The contestant was the selection committee's least favorite for that week, and was eliminated.

^Note 1: The Preheat challenge in the third episode was a team challenge so Cory and Kevin won as a team.

== Season 6 (2020) ==
Episodes
No. overall	No. in season	Title	Original release date
36	1	"Spring's Natural Wonders"	March 9, 2020
Preliminary Heat: Bake 1 geometric tart, in 2 hours. Each baker got to choose 2 spring fruits: Val got kiwi and kiwi, Molly got strawberry and rhubarb, Franck got mango and rhubarb, Anibal got lemon and rhubarb, Arin got kiwi and rhubarb, Tati got kiwi and rhubarb, Sandra got lemon and strawberry, Aris got mango and lemon, Aisha got strawberry and mango, Christine got mango and strawberry, and Sohrob got lemon and strawberry. Winner: Arin (His advantage was first choice of the theme in the main heat.) Main Heat: The bakers had 3 hours to make a spring transformation faultline cake. They contestants all grabbed cards with 5 different themes: Arin, who got to pick first for winning the preheat, chose bare trees/blooming trees, as did Tati. Val and Aris chose hibernating bear/active bear, Christine and Anibal chose bird nest/hatched eggs, Sohrob and Aisha chose rain/sun, and Molly, Franck and Sandra chose caterpillar/butterfly. The mid-round twist was to add flavored salt. Winner: Val Criado Eliminated: Anibal Rodriguez
37	2	"Spring Skies"	March 16, 2020
Preliminary Heat: Bake 12 sunrise or sunset-themed blinged out donuts, in 90 minutes. Aris, Sohrob, Tati, Molly and Franck chose sunrise, and Val, Aisha, Christine, Arin and Sandra chose sunset. Winner: Sandra (Her advantage was a special galactic resource folder, with inspiring photos from NASA.) Main Heat: The bakers had 3 hours to make a spring starry night sky dessert, each with a different celestial theme. Molly and Franck chose Milky Way, Aisha and Tati chose Northern Lights, Sandra and Sohrob chose Supermoon, Arin and Val chose Shooting Star, and Christine and Aris chose Meteor Shower. The mid-round twist was to "spring forward", losing 10 minutes of baking time. Winner: Arin Hiebert Eliminated: Sandra Danso-Boadi
38	3	"The One About Puppies and Kitties"	March 23, 2020
Preliminary Heat: Bake 12 cat-themed eclairs (kittyclairs), each with a different flavor based on popular orange cat names, in 90 minutes. Arin and Aisha chose butterscotch, Franck, Sohrob and Aris chose marmalade, Molly and Val chose clementine, and Christine and Tati chose ginger. Winner: Arin and Aisha tied (Their advantage was exemption from the mid-round twist in the main heat.) Main Heat: The bakers had 2 hours to make a dessert based on a dog breed and the dog's favorite spring pastime. Molly and Aris chose Australian Shepherd and flying disc, Arin, Tati and Franck chose Lab and tennis ball, Sohrob and Christine chose Dachshund and skateboard, and Aisha and Val chose poodle and kayak. The mid-round twist was to add an edible dog bone. Winner: Sohrob Esmaili Eliminated: Franck Iglesias
39	4	"Spring in the Great Outdoors: Team Challenges"	March 30, 2020
Preliminary Heat: Everyone was paired up, and had 90 minutes to make complementary fruit-flavored hand-held hiking treats. The teams were decided based on who chose the same fruit. Sohrob and Tati chose pineapple, Aris and Val chose blueberry, Molly and Aisha chose raspberry, and Arin and Christine chose peach. Winner: Sohrob and Tati (Their advantage was to switch any of the other teams around for the main heat. They chose to pair Aisha with Val and Aris with Molly.) Main Heat: The teams had 2 hours to create bike paths, making Paris Brest bicycle wheels, set on a decorated themed backdrop. The mid-round twist was to add a picnic ingredient. Sohrob and Tati chose country lane, and their twist ingredient was goat cheese; Aisha and Val chose city park, and their twist ingredient was grape; Arin and Christine chose desert canyon, and their twist ingredient was champagne; Aris and Molly chose vineyard trail, and their twist ingredient was figs. Winner: Tati Vernot Eliminated: Aisha Momaney
40	5	"Trolls World Tour"	April 6, 2020
Preliminary Heat: Bake 12 tiny, colorful treats in 90 minutes. Molly chose green, Tati chose yellow, Aris chose blue, Arin chose red, Val chose pink, Sohrob chose purple, and Christine chose orange. Winner: Arin (His advantage was first choice of the theme for the main heat.) Main Heat: The bakers had 2 hours to make a cake with spring fruit, inspired by a different music theme from Trolls World Tour. The mid-round twist was a Troll cake topper. Arin chose classical, and the corresponding topper for the twist was Trollzart. Christine chose Pop, and the cake topper was Queen Poppy. Tati chose country, and the cake topper was Delta Dawn. Sohrob chose hip hop, and the cake topper was Tiny Diamond. Val chose funk, and the cake topper was Prince D. Molly chose techno, and the cake topper was King Trollex. Aris chose rock n' roll, and the cake topper was Queen Barb. Winner: Aris Rodriguez Eliminated: Molly Matthaei
41	6	"Spring Declutter"	April 13, 2020
Preliminary Heat: Bake flowerless and flourless minimalist desserts in 90 minutes. The bakers each chose a nut flour to bake with: Val got pecan flour, Aris got brazil nut flour, Christine got hazelnut flour, Tati got walnut flour, Sohrob got almond flour, and Arin got pistachio flour. Winner: Val (Her advantage was first choice at foraging for the main heat's theme item.) Main Heat: The bakers had 2 hours to make a dessert inspired by a "yard sale" item. Val chose an embroidered table runner, Aris chose a cross stitch, Tati chose a quilt, Sohrob chose a pillow, Arin chose a "home sweet home" sign, and Christine chose a jar with a koozie. The mid-round twist was the addition of a discarded food item. Aris and Christine got coffee grounds, Tati and Val got orange peel, and Sohrob and Arin got used tea bags. Winner: Tati Vernot Eliminated: Aris Rodriguez
42	7	"Spring Flower Power"	April 20, 2020
Preliminary Heat: Bake cherry desserts with a different crumbly topping and a different spring herb, in 90 minutes. Christine got crumble and rosemary, Sohrob got crisp and pineapple sage, Val got brown betty and lemon verbena, Tati got cobbler and lavender, and Arin got buckle and thyme. Winner: Christine (Her advantage was a variety of flowery decorating tools for the main heat.) Main Heat: The bakers had 2 hours to make a flower crown cake. Val chose peonies, Tati chose pansies, Christine chose tulips, Sohrob chose poppies, and Arin chose daffodils. The mid-round twist was to add an edible ribbon. Winner: Val Criado Eliminated: Christine Nguyen
43	8	"Mom's Spring Getaway"	April 27, 2020
Preliminary Heat: Make margarita inspired desserts in 90 minutes, each with a different fruit and pepper combination. Val chose blackberry and jalapeno, Sohrob chose passion fruit and habanero, Tati chose watermelon and serrano, and Arin chose mango and birds eye chili. Winner: Arin (His advantage was 15 minutes of assistance from Cory Barrett, the previous year's winner.) Main Heat: The bakers had 2 hours to make a dessert inspired by a pool floatie. Sohrob chose the flamingo, Val chose the seahorse, Tati chose the peacock, and Arin chose the swan. The mid-round twist was the addition of an edible pool for the floatie to swim in. Winner: Sohrob Esmaili Eliminated: Val Criado
44	9	"Spring Senioritis – Class of 2020"	May 4, 2020
Preliminary Heat: Make 2 desserts – one rolled and one dippable – for a graduation buffet in 2 and a half hours. Sohrob chose kindergarten, Tati chose high school, and Arin chose college. Winner: Sohrob (His advantage in the main heat was having one theme offered, which he could keep or give to another baker, in which case he would have to keep the second one offered.) Main Heat: The final three had 4 hours to make prom cakes inspired by different decades. Sohrob chose to give the '80s to Arin, and had to keep the '50s. Tati got the '60s. They each had a "prom date" model to use as inspiration, which they had 90 seconds to sketch. There is no mid-round twist. Winner of $25,000: Sohrob Esmaili Eliminated: Arin Hiebert & Tati Vernot

=== Contestants ===
- 1st – Sohrob Esmaili from San Francisco, California
- 2/3rd – Arin Hiebert from Calgary, Alberta
- 2/3rd – Tati Vernot from Miami, Florida
- 4th – Val Criado from San Antonio, Texas
- 5th – Christine Nguyen from Sugar Land, Texas
- 6th – Aris Rodriguez from Sedona, Arizona
- 7th – Molly Matthaei from Jackson Hole, Wyoming
- 8th – Aisha Momaney from New York, New York
- 9th – Franck Iglesias from Old Saybrook, Connecticut
- 10th – Sandra Danso-Boadi from Mississauga, Ontario
- 11th – Anibal Rodriguez from Rio Grande, Puerto Rico

=== Elimination Table ===
Place	Contestant	Episode								
Place	Contestant	1	2	3	4	5	6	7	8	9
1	Sohrob	IN	IN	WIN	IN‡	LOW	LOW	LOW	WIN	WINNER‡
2	Arin	IN‡	WIN	IN‡	IN	IN‡	HIGH	IN	LOW‡	RUNNER-UP
2	Tati	HIGH	IN	IN	WIN‡	IN	WIN	IN	LOW	RUNNER-UP
4	Val	WIN	IN	IN	HIGH	IN	IN‡	WIN	OUT	
5	Christine	LOW	HIGH	IN	LOW	HIGH	IN	OUT‡		
6	Aris	IN	IN	LOW	IN	WIN	OUT			
7	Molly	IN	IN	HIGH	IN	OUT				
8	Aisha	IN	IN	IN‡	OUT					
9	Franck	LOW	LOW	OUT						
10	Sandra	HIGH	OUT‡							
11	Anibal	OUT								

(WINNER) The contestant won the competition.
(RUNNER-UP) The contestant made it to the finale, but did not win.
‡ The contestant won the Preheat challenge for that week.
(WIN) The contestant won the Main Heat challenge for that week.
(HIGH) The contestant was one of the selection committee's favorites for that week.
(IN) The contestant performed well enough to move on to the next week.
(LOW) The contestant was one of the selection committee's three or four least favorites for that week, but was not eliminated.
(OUT) The contestant was the selection committee's least favorite for that week, and was eliminated.

== Season 7 (2021) ==
11 bakers enter the kitchen to compete for the $25,000 prize, a chance to be featured in Food Network Magazine, and the title of Spring Baking Champion. This season, bakers are ranked on "The Spring Board" after each pre-heat and main heat. The lowest ranking baker on the board after each main heat is eliminated.

Episodes
No. overall	No. in season	Title	Original release date
45	1	"Spring on the Farm"	February 22, 2021
Preliminary Heat: Bake a dozen breakfast treats, using a fresh spring vegetable, in 90 minutes. Veruska and Laurent chose yellow squash, Stephanie and Natalie chose parsnips, Jahmal and LeeAnn chose fennel, Chiantae chose zucchini, Derek and Dayron chose carrots, and Keya and Madiha chose beets. Winner: Veruska (Her advantage was first choice of milk in the main heat, and nobody else could use the type of milk she chose.) Main Heat: The bakers had 3 hours to make desserts featuring dancing cows, using a different type of milk. Veruska chose coconut milk, Derek and Jahmal chose raw Jersey cow milk, Chiantae and Natalie chose goat milk, Stephanie and Dayron chose oat milk, Keya and Laurent chose hemp milk, and Madiha and LeeAnn chose almond milk. The mid-round twist was to add an edible cow bell. Winner: Derek Corsino Eliminated: Dayron Santamaria
46	2	"Spring Celebration"	March 1, 2021
Preliminary Heat: Bake colorful handheld desserts for the Hindu festival Holi, utilizing an Indian spice, in 90 minutes. Derek and Veruska chose cardamom, Keya and Stephanie chose fenugreek, Jahmal and Chiantae chose mace, Laurent and LeeAnn chose coriander, and Natalie and Madiha chose cinnamon. Winner: Keya (Her advantage was skipping the main heat twist.) Main Heat: The bakers had 3 hours to make a leprechaun inspired dessert for St Patrick's Day, incorporating a green ingredient. Veruska and Derek chose green apple, Keya and Stephanie chose mint, LeeAnn and Jahmal chose avocado, Chiantae and Laurent chose lime, and Natalie and Madiha chose matcha. The mid-round twist was an Irish beverage to include in their dessert. Chiantae, Jahmal and Veruska chose Irish whiskey, Natalie, Madiha and LeeAnn chose Irish breakfast tea, and Laurent, Stephanie and Derek chose Irish cream. Winner: Keya Wingfield Eliminated: LeeAnn Tolentino
47	3	"Spring Bunnies and Chickens"	March 8, 2021
Preliminary Heat: Create egg desserts, decorated with chickens, and with a fun flavor hidden inside, in 90 minutes. The bakers had to go on an egg hunt outside to find golden eggs with their assigned hidden flavor. Chiantae, Keya and Natalie got praline, Derek, Madiha and Veruska got malted milk, and Stephanie, Laurent and Jahmal got peanut butter. Winner: Derek (His advantage was additional dried fruit to use in the main heat – raisins, cherries, cranberries, apricots, and crystallized ginger.) Main Heat: The bakers had 3 and a half hours to bake hot cross buns in the shape of rabbits (hot cross bunnies), each with a different dried fruit. Stephanie, Keya and Derek chose currants, Veruska, Madiha and Laurent chose golden raisins, Jamahl, Natalie and Chiantae chose candied orange, The mid-round twist was to make a jam or spread to go with their hot cross bunnies. Winner: Natalie Soto Eliminated: Laurent Carratie
48	4	"Spring Romance"	March 15, 2021
Preliminary Heat: Team challenge: In pairs, bake a proposal dessert plate using a berry and chocolate pairing, in 90 minutes. Natalie, the previous episode's main heat winner, got to choose the teams. Natalie and Derek got milk chocolate and blackberries, Stephanie and Veruska got ruby chocolate and blueberries, Chiantae and Jahmal got dark chocolate and strawberries, and Keya and Madiha got white chocolate and raspberries. Winner: Jahmal and Chiantae (Their advantage was to swap members of any two teams they wanted. They chose to pair Natalie with Keya, and Madiha with Derek.) Main Heat: The pairs had 3 hours to bake spring wedding cakes. Each baker had to make one side of the cake, without being able to see what each other was making, and their cakes – while not having to be identical – did have to match when put together. Each team had a different wedding theme, and the mid-round twist was an aphrodisiac ingredient to include. Stephanie and Veruska chose tropical opulence as their theme, and their twist ingredient was figs; Jahmal and Chiantae chose desert chic as their theme, and their twist ingredient was chili; Derek and Madiha chose mystical as their theme, and their twist ingredient was honey; and Natalie and Keya chose bohemian as their theme, and their twist ingredient was saffron. Winner: Natalie Soto Eliminated: Stephanie DeVoll
49	5	"Spring Babies"	March 22, 2021
Preliminary Heat: Bake a dessert that looks like a baby shower gift, using two spring flavors, in 90 minutes. Derek, Chiantae and Jahmal got rhubarb and ginger, Natalie and Keya got lemon and thyme, and Veruska and Madiha got kumquat and mint. Winner: Natalie (Her advantage was to assign the themes in the main heat.) Main Heat: The bakers had 2 hours to make baby shower tower desserts, using a different baby shower theme. Natalie and Chiantae got 'twinkle twinkle little star', Jahmal, Madiha and Veruska got 'teddy bear tea party', and Derek and Keya got 'baby shark'. The mid-round twist was to add coffee somewhere to their dessert. Winner: Madiha Chughtai Eliminated: Jahmal Dailey
50	6	"Spring Flower Fiesta"	March 29, 2021
Preliminary Heat: Bake a dozen party favor desserts using pressed dried flowers in 90 minutes. Chiantae and Natalie got macarons, Derek and Madiha got mini-cakes, and Veruska and Keya got mini-pie. Winner: Keya (Her advantage was to assign the flavors in the main heat.) Main Heat: The bakers had 2 and a half hours to make a tiered flower fantasy cake, each with a different flower flavor. Keya chose rose, Derek got jasmine, Veruska got orange blossom, Chiantae got elderflower, Natalie got violet, and Madiha got hibiscus. The mid-round twist was to make an edible cake topper representing their chosen flower. Winner: Natalie Soto Although Derek and Veruska were ranked lowest and second lowest respectively, no one was eliminated. The judges stated that they chose not to send anyone home, as all contestants had performed well in the main heat.
51	7	"The Spring Cookie Classic"	April 5, 2021
Preliminary Heat: Make 6 mini desserts incorporating stone fruit, ice cream, and pre-made sugar cookie dough in 90 minutes. Ice cream sandwiches were not allowed. Veruska and Chiantae chose nectarines, Derek and Natalie chose peaches, and Madiha and Keya chose plums. Winner: Veruska (Her advantage was to assign the flavors in the main heat. She actually gave everybody the flavor they wanted – except for Madiha, who wanted the same flavor she did.) Main Heat: The bakers had 2 hours to make a dessert inspired by a cookie flavor. Veruska chose chocolate chip, Derek got jam thumbprint, Keya got black and white, Chiantae got snickerdoodle, Natalie got ginger snap and Madiha got oatmeal raisin. The mid-round twist was to bake half a dozen cookies of the same type as their flavor inspiration. Winner: Veruska Samanez Eliminated: Madiha Chughtai
52	8	"Spring Pastimes"	April 12, 2021
Preliminary Heat: Bake 6 campfire skillet desserts using a tropical fruit. Derek chose pineapple, Keya chose kiwi, Natalie chose mango, Chiantae chose banana, and Veruska chose passion fruit. Winner: Derek (His advantage was an extra 10 minutes in the main heat.) Main Heat: The bakers had 2 and a half hours (2 hours and 40 minutes for Derek) to make cakes decorated to look like a craft. Derek chose needlepoint, Natalie chose lacework, Keya chose patchwork, Veruska chose knitting, and Chiantae chose crocheting. The mid-round twist was to add an edible signature to their cake. Winner: Veruska Samanez Eliminated: Chiantae Campbell
53	9	"Spring Break"	April 19, 2021
Preliminary Heat: Snackify spring break desserts – Bake a treat that combines an international dessert and a sweet snack, in 90 minutes. Derek got French napoleon and cupcake, Veruska got Australian pavlova and donut, Keya got Italian tiramisu and brownie, and Natalie got Mexican tres leches cake and toaster pastry. Winner: Keya (Her advantage was first choice of theme in the main heat. The other bakers had to blindly choose.) Main Heat: The bakers had 2 and a half hours to bake 2 desserts made into a family vacation themed dessert-scape. Derek got national park, Veruska got culture in the city, Natalie got amusement park, and Keya got beach. The mid-round twist was to add a cocktail-inspired decorative element. Winner: Derek Corsino Eliminated: Veruska Samanez
54	10	"Spring Gardens: Birds and Bugs"	April 26, 2021
Preliminary Heat: Bake a dessert inspired by spring songbirds in 2 hours. Natalie, who was on the bottom the previous week, got to assign songbirds. She chose bluebird and assigned Baltimore oriole to Derek, and American robin to Keya. For the finale, they threw in a pre-heat mid-round twist: include a miniature decorative bird feeder. Winner: Natalie (Her advantage was to assign the bug decorations for the final heat.) Main Heat: The final three had 5 hours to bake a two-tier spring garden cake, including two garden bugs, plus a surprise design element inside one of the tiers. Natalie chose ladybug and butterfly and gave dragonfly and bee to Keya, and caterpillar and spider to Derek. The mid-round twist was that there was no twist. Winner of $25,000: Keya Wingfield

=== Contestants ===
- 1st – Keya Wingfield, pastry chef and bakery owner from Richmond, Virginia
- 2nd – Natalie Soto, cake artist from Capistrano Beach, California
- 3rd – Derek Corsino, culinary arts instructor from Saint Helena, California
- 4th – Veruska Samanez, pastry chef and bakery owner from Cedar Grove, New Jersey
- 5th – Chiantae Campbell, bakery owner from Miami, Florida
- 6th – Madiha Chughtai, home baker from Richmond, Texas
- 7th – Jahmal Dailey, pastry chef from Brooklyn, New York
- 8th – Stephanie DeVoll, pastry chef and bakery owner from Norwalk, California
- 9th – Laurent Carratie, executive pastry chef from Mendham, New Jersey
- 10th – LeeAnn Tolentino, pastry chef from Los Angeles, California
- 11th – Dayron Santamaria, executive pastry chef from Takoma Park, Maryland

=== Elimination Table ===
Place	Contestant	Episode									
Place	Contestant	1	2	3	4	5	6	7	8	9	10
1	Keya	HIGH	WIN‡	IN	HIGH	IN	HIGH‡	IN	LOW	HIGH‡	WINNER
2	Natalie	IN	IN	WIN	WIN	LOW‡	WIN	IN	IN	LOW	RUNNER-UP‡
3	Derek	WIN	HIGH	IN‡	IN	HIGH	LOW	LOW	HIGH‡	WIN	RUNNER-UP
4	Veruska	IN‡	LOW	HIGH	LOW	IN	LOW	WIN‡	WIN	OUT	
5	Chiantae	IN	IN	LOW	IN‡	IN	IN	IN	OUT		
6	Madiha	LOW	IN	IN	IN	WIN	IN	OUT			
7	Jahmal	IN	IN	IN	IN‡	OUT					
8	Stephanie	IN	IN	IN	OUT						
9	Laurent	IN	IN	OUT							
10	LeeAnn	IN	OUT								
11	Dayron	OUT									

== Season 8 (2022) ==
Twelve bakers enter the Spring Baking Barn to create delicious desserts featuring the freshest fruit and flowers the farm has to offer! In the first round, host Molly Yeh challenges the bakers to make fruit tarts that showcase their distinct personalities. Then, the bakers must fight to remain in the game with a floral bonanza cake that wows judges Kardea Brown, Nancy Fuller, and Duff Goldman.

Episodes
No. overall	No. in season	Title	Original release date
55	1	"Everything's Coming Up Floral"	February 28, 2022
Preliminary Heat: Make 6 tarts that represent your personality, each with a different fruit in 90 minutes. Tom and Carolyn each received strawberries. Jaleesa and Justin each received cherries, Kim and Diego each received raspberries, Dennis and Annabelle each received blueberries, Alexis and Yohan each received oranges, and Romy and Jenniffer each received blackberries. Winner: Justin (His advantage was to choose a flower instead of blindly picking one; he picked lavender.) Main Heat: The bakers have 3 hours to bake a floral bonanza cake, and each have to incorporate a flower in it. Dennis and Yohan picked rose, Annabelle, Tom, and Romy picked chamomile, Jaleesa, Kim, and Alexis picked hibiscus, and Carolyn, Jenniffer, and Diego picked elderflower. The mid-round twist was to add an edible fake critter of their choice to the top of the cake, each with an immune supportive ingredient. Dennis and Alexis picked lemon zest, Romy and Annabelle picked ginger, Kim and Jaleesa picked cinnamon, Diego and Yohan picked turmeric, Tom and Jenniffer picked cardamom, and Justin and Carolyn picked cloves. Winners: Justin Ross & Carolyn Portuondo Eliminated: Yohan Lee & Alexis Wells
56	2	"Molly's Mardi Gras"	March 7, 2022
Preliminary Heat: Make two baked good that incorporate the flavors of king cake (cinnamon, cream cheese, and rum) in 90 minutes. Winner: Diego (His advantage was being exempt from the twist.) Main Heat: The bakers have to make a cake that resembles a Marci Gras float, each with a different Marci Gras flavor. Meanwhile, two bakers, Marco and Stephon, also make Marci Gras float cakes to get a spot in the competition. Kim chose drunk grasshopper, Tom chose milk punch, Diego and Annabelle chose bananas foster, Marco and Dennis chose hurricane, Stephon chose chocolate & bourbon, Jenniffer and Romy chose mint julep, and Justin and Jaleesa chose praline. The mid-round twist was for all the bakers, minus Diego, to make half a dozen beignets and incorporate them into the cake. Winners: Stephon Cook & Tom Smallwood Eliminated: Jenniffer Woo
57	3	"Coffee and Tea with Molly"	March 14, 2022
Preliminary Heat: Bake a supersized super-stuffed cookie flavored with a coffee beverage in 90 minutes. Jaleesa & Stephon chose espresso romano, Tom & Diego chose Mexican coffee, Kim & Justin chose marocchino, Annabelle & Carolyn chose caramel macchiato, and Romy & Dennis chose café bombon. Winner: Jaleesa (Her advantage was picking her partner for the main heat, she chose Carolyn.) Main Heat: The bakers are split into 5 teams of two and have to bake a platter of baked goods made for a tea party, each have to bake two baked goods, and have to bake an edible teapot or many edible teacups incorporated with tea as a team. Tom was teamed with Annabelle, Diego was teamed with Stephom, Justin was teamed with Romy, Dennis was teamed with Kim, and Jaleesa was teamed with Carolyn. Winner: Jaleesa Mason & Carolyn Portuondo & Romy Guiot Eliminated: Stephon Cook
58	4	"Spring Surprises"	March 21, 2022
Preliminary Heat: Bake a citrus upside down cake or 6 mini desserts. Kim and Justin chose meyer lemon, Tom and Carolyn chose tangerine, Jaleesa and Romy chose grapefruit, Dennis and Diego chose blood orange, and Annabelle received lime. Winner: Dennis (Despite Dennis winning, Carolyn received the advantage of picking a type of pie, she chose lemon meringue.) Main Heat: The bakers are assigned with baking a pie that looks fresh and new in 3 hours. Jaleesa and Dennis chose key lime, Annabelle and Justin chose strawberry rhubarb, Tom and Kim chose coconut cream, Romy and Diego chose raspberry chiffon. Winner: Dennis Van Eliminated: Annabelle Asher
59	5	"Cherry Blossom Bake-Off"	March 28, 2022
Preliminary Heat: Bake a Japanese cheesecake flavored with Sakura in 160 minutes. Winner: Romy (His advantage was getting help from Duff for 10 minutes.) Main Heat: The bakers are assigned with baking a two-tier double-barrel cherry blossom cake flavored with a traditional Japanese flavor in 3 hours. Tom and Dennis chose ume, Romy and Diego chose yuzu, Jaleesa and Justin chose red bean, and Carolyn and Kim chose sesame. The mid-round twist was to bake a cookie decorated with a word meaningful to the baker. Winner: Carolyn Portuondo Eliminated: Kim Wood
60	6	"Take Me Out To The Ballgame"	April 4, 2022
Preliminary Heat: Bake two treats based on a ball park snack . Diego chose chicken nuggets and fries, Dennis chose peanuts, Carolyn chose beer, Justin chose burgers, Tom chose churros, Jaleesa chose corn on the cob, and Romy chose cotton candy. Winner: Dennis (His advantage was learning the mid-round twist 30 minutes before the other bakers.) Main Heat: The bakers are assigned with making a cookie salad with fruit, cream, and two different cookies, one of which has to be a fudge-striped in 150 minutes. Carolyn chose figs, Justin chose apricots, Dennis chose peaches, Diego chose strawberries, Romy chose raspberries, Tom chose blueberries, and Jaleesa chose mandarin oranges. The mid-round twist was to make a homemade sprinkle. Winner: Tom Smallwood Eliminated: Carolyn Portuondo
61	7	"Pretty as a Picture"	April 11, 2022
Preliminary Heat: Bake a sweet, savory, and buttery breakfast snack with an herb in 90 minutes. Tom chose rosemary, Jaleesa chose thyme, Romy chose basil, Dennis chose mint, Justin chose sage, and Diego chose tarragon. Winner: Tom (His advantage was choosing the painting he wanted first.) Main Heat: The bakers are designed with baking a palette cake incorporated with a savory ingredient decorated with a painting of pictures on Molly’s farm using the palette-knife technique in 150 minutes. Romy chose sauerkraut and a picture of a plower in a field, Diego chose tomato soup and a picture of a cat in a garden, Justin chose labneh and a picture of tractors in front of a sunset, Dennis chose jalapeño and a picture of two water tanks on a field with a rainbow in the background, Jaleesa chose black sesame and a group of chickens in a field, and Tom chose tahini and a picture of a field in front of a cloudy sky. Winner: Jaleesa Mason Eliminated: Diego Chiarello
62	8	"Sweets and Second Chances"	April 18, 2022
Preliminary Heat: In a “Spring is the season for rebirth” twist, Carolyn was given a second chance by the judges and returned to the competition. The challenge was making a choux pastry inspired by candy. Carolyn chose chocolate mint candies, Dennis chose rainbow belts, Jaleesa chose candied peach, Justin chose blueberry sour candy, Romy chose licorice, and Tom chose chocolate covered espresso beans. Winner: Romy (His advantage was choosing his teammate and first choice of an animal) Main Heat: Bakers pair up to create a dessert board that represents the abundance of Spring using a mother and baby animal as a centerpiece. Romy paired with Justin (rabbit and bunny), Carolyn paired with Dennis (sheep and lamb), and Tom paired with Jaleesa (duck and duckling). Romy and Justin make a carrot cake centerpiece. Romy is making a ruby dipped fondant cake with ruby chocolate glaze and mascarpone cream and a crispy sable with a blueberry ganache. Justin is making carrot spice cake macarons and a raspberry pistachio cake. After having issues with the macarons, Justin switched to a vanilla spiced mousse cup. Tom and Jaleesa make a duck pond centerpiece using pull apart lemon cupcakes and lime sugar cookies. Tom is making duck footprint macaron with orange compote and lemon curd tartlet “eggs”. Jaleesa is making strawberry chocolate “nest” donuts and duck feather brownies. Carolyn and Dennis make a “Sheep & Lamb” cookie centerpiece. Carolyn is making passion fruit cheesecake “chick” and passion fruit “cow” sandwich cookies. Dennis is making a pink champagne “pig” cake and a flourless chocolate “horse” torte. Winner: Carolyn Portuondo Eliminated: Justin Ross
63	9	"Farmhouse Chic"	April 25, 2022
Preliminary Heat: In the semi-final episode, bakers were challenged to bake 12 cocktail flavored cupcakes in 90 minutes. Jaleesa received Piña Colada, Dennis received Sangria, Carolyn received Mojito, Romy received Margarita, and Tom received Mai Tai. Winner: Dennis (Once again, Dennis received no advantage for winning the pre-heat.) Main Heat: For the Main Heat, the bakers are asked to make a farm fresh cheese dessert infused with wine 2-1/2 hours. Carolyn got camembert (brie) cheese and made a pistachio cake with red wine poached pears and camembert cream. Dennis got cheddar and made yellow and white cheddar cheesecake with pretzel crust and red wine poached apple. Jaleesa got mascarpone and made a mascarpone amaretto cheesecake with an almond crust and Lambrusco gelée. Romy got ricotta and made a ricotta lemon cake with rosé gelée, rosé crémeux and ricotta diplomat cream. Lastly, Tom got goat cheese and made a hazelnut cream tart with Riesling honey gelée and vanilla goat cheese crémeux. Winner: Romuald “Romy” Guiot Eliminated: Tom Smallwood
64	10	"All About Family"	May 2, 2022
Preliminary Heat: Winner: Jaleesa Mason Main Heat: Winner: Jaleesa Mason Eliminated: Romuald “Romy” Guiot (before the Sudden Death bake could begin, which was to make a dessert with sprinkles, Romy chose to withdraw from the competition)

=== Contestants ===
- 1st – Jaleesa Mason from Spanish Harlem, New York
- 2/3rd – Dennis Van from Austin, Texas
- 2/3rd – Carolyn Portuondo from Honolulu, Hawaii
- 4th – Romuald “Romy” Guiot from Los Angeles, California
- 5th – Tom Smallwood from New York City, New York
- 6th – Justin Ross from Richmond, Virginia
- 7th – Diego Chiarello from Houston, Texas
- Previously 7th – Carolyn Portuondo from Honolulu, Hawaii
- 8th – Kim Wood from Simsbury, Connecticut
- 9th – Annabelle Asher from Fort Lauderdale, Florida
- 10th – Stephon Cook from New Orleans, Louisiana
- 11th – Jenniffer Woo from Palm Beach Gardens, Florida
- 12th – Marco Salden from Denver, Colorado
- 13th – Alexis Wells from Carlsbad, California
- 14th – Yohan Lee from Nashville, Tennessee

=== Elimination Table ===
Place	Contestant	Episode										
Place	Contestant	1	2	3	4	5	6	7	8	9	10a	10b
1	Jaleesa	HIGH	IN	WIN‡	LOW	IN	IN	WIN	LOW	LOW	SAFE	WINNER‡
2	Carolyn	WIN	IN	WIN	IN	WIN	OUT		WIN	HIGH	SAFE	RUNNER-UP
2	Dennis	IN	LOW	IN	WIN‡	IN	LOW	IN	IN	LOW‡	IN	RUNNER-UP
4	Romy	IN	IN	WIN	IN	HIGH‡	IN	HIGH	LOW‡	WIN	WDR	
5	Tom	IN	WIN	IN	IN	LOW	WIN	IN‡	LOW	OUT		
6	Justin	IN‡	IN	IN	IN	IN	IN	LOW	OUT			
7	Diego	IN	HIGH‡	IN	HIGH	IN	HIGH	OUT				
8	Kim	IN	IN	LOW	IN	OUT						
9	Annabelle	IN	IN	IN	OUT							
10	Stephon		WIN	OUT								
11	Jenniffer	LOW	OUT									
11	Marco		OUT									
12	Alexis	OUT										
12	Yohan	OUT										

== Season 9 (2023) ==
12 talented bakers bake their way through spring challenges that all deal with love. With the help of host Jesse Palmer the bakers bake their best to impress the three judges, Nancy Fuller, Kardea Brown, and Duff Goldman.

Episodes
No. overall	No. in season	Title	Original release date
65	1	"Who Do You Love?"	March 6, 2023
Preliminary Heat: Jesse has the bakers make an elevated version of the dessert that got them into baking and to decorate it with an assigned flower. Winner: Christian Velez Main Heat: The bakers have to make a two tiered cake that evokes what they love to do with someone they love in the spring, with having an assigned berry flavor. The twist was to use citrus fruits, like Cara Cara oranges, to add to their cake. Winner: Jai Xiong Eliminated: Keem Jackson
66	2	"Spring Passion"	March 13, 2023
Preliminary Heat: Things get heated when host Jesse Palmer challenges the bakers to spice up bento box cakes using ingredients that are also aphrodisiacs Winner: Molly Roberston (Her advantage was to pick what pepper she had to use) Main Heat: The bakers make desserts featuring passionfruit and chiles that perfectly balance passion and heat. Winner: Jai Xiong Eliminated: Victoria Casinelli
67	3	"Ill-fated Romance"	March 20, 2023
Preliminary Heat: Jesse has bakers make napoleons with assigned flavors. Winner: Luke Dearduff (His advantage was to pick his partner for the main heat. He chose Jai) Main Heat: The bakers are put into teams of two and make break up cakes that look similar but are opposite in flavor.The teams were Molly and April, Jai and Luke, Clement and Manja, Christian and Jessica, Josh and Michele. Winners: April Franqueza, Molly Roberston & Michelle Henry (Molly and April won as a team and Michelle had the best overall desert) Eliminated: Manja Blackwood
68	4	"Fool For Love"	March 27, 2023
Preliminary Heat: Jesse has the bakers make foule tarts for the judges. Today was the April Fools Episode. Winner: Clement Le Deore (He got a 10 minute head start) Main Heat: The bakers are tasked to make cakes that look like pies, to see if they can fool the judges. The twist was to make a cheese ice cream to go with their cake/pie look-alike. Winner: Luke Dearduff Eliminated: Michelle Henry
69	5	"Love in the Great Outdoors"	April 3, 2023
Preliminary Heat: Jesse has the bakers create celestial mousse cakes. Winner: Christian Velez (He got to choose his partner, he chose Molly) Main Heat: Then, the bakers pair up in a team challenge to make romantic croquembouche arbours and floral macarons that are fit for the judges' spring garden party. The teams were April and Clement, Jai and Jessica, Luke and Josh, and Molly and Christian Winners: April Franqueza and Clement Le Deore (April and Clement won as a team and April had the best overall dish) Eliminated: Jessica Quiet
70	6	"Retro Love"	April 10, 2023
Preliminary Heat: Jesse tasks the bakers to make half a dozen cupcakes inspired by 50s soda pop flavor. Josh got cola, Christian got Grape, Molly got Ginger Ale, Clement got cherry, Luke got cream soda, April got root beer, and Jai got lemon lime. Winner: Clement Le Deore (He got to choose his flavor for the main heat, he chose strawberry) Main Heat: The bakers are tasked to make 60s shag carpet cakes. Molly got white chocolate macadamia nut, Jai got coconut and pineapple, Josh got cream orange, Christian got Banana Mango, Luke got cherry and lime, and April got Peach and Basil. Winner: Christian Velez Eliminated: Jai Xiong
71	7	"The Things We Bake for Love"	April 17, 2023
Preliminary Heat: The bakers have to make muffins. Winner: Molly Robertson (She got choose which chocolate she wanted and assign the other bakers chocolate) Main Heat: The bakers had to make chocolate pies. Josh got white chocolate, April got milk chocolate, Christian got ruby chocolate, Clement got blonde chocolate, Molly got dark chocolate and Luke got almond chocolate. Winner: Clement Le Deore Eliminated: April Franqueza
72	8	"Love Around the World"	April 24, 2023
Preliminary Heat: Jesse has the bakers make elevated desert mashups. Winner: Josh Cain (He got to choose which country he wanted, he chose Mexico.) Main Heat: The bakers are tasked to make delicious cheesecakes inspired by other countries. Winner: Luke Dearduff Eliminated: Josh Cain
73	9	"A Mother's Love"	May 1, 2023
Preliminary Heat: Host Jesse Palmer springs into the season with a Mother's Day celebration; for the bakers to show mom how much she means to them, they create bouquets of tulips. Winner: Clement Le Deore Main Heat: The bakers are tasked to create rosé-infused desserts before the judges decide who moves on to the finale. For this twist, they must create a granita to go along with their desserts. Winner: Christian Velez Molly and Luke are the lowest ranked in the main heat, sending them to an elimination bake-off in the next episode.
74	10	"Sealing the Deal"	May 8, 2023
Elimination Bake-Off: As the lowest ranked in the previous challenge, Molly and Luke compete in an elimination bake-off. They have 60 minutes to make a dozen doughnuts as bridal shower favors. Luke picks "groom's guests" as his theme, while Molly picks "bride's guests". Eliminated: Molly Preliminary Heat: The three finalists make a surprise proposal dessert which will reveal an engagement ring. Winner: Clement wins. His advantage is to assign all bakers to clients in the final challenge. Main Heat: The finalists have five hours to make wedding cakes for three engaged couples, each requesting different flavors and aesthetics. Luke makes a cake featuring the Eiffel Tower with citrus and olive oil flavors; Christian makes a Boho style cake with cream cheese, chocolate, and raspberry fillings; Clement makes a cherry blossom cake with rum and cannoli-inspired fillings. Winner of $25,000: Luke

=== Contestants ===
- 1st – Luke Deardurff , Executive Pastry chef from Bronx, New York
- 2/3rd – Christian Velez , Culinary Arts Teacher from Hollywood, Florida
- 2/3rd – Clement Le Deore , Home Baker from San Diego, California
- 4th – Molly Robertson, Home Baker from Natchez, Mississippi
- 5th – Josh Cain, Chocolatier from Orlando, Florida
- 6th – April Franqueza , Pastry Chef from Sapphire, North Carolina
- 7th – Jai Xiong, Culinary Instructor from Savage, Minnesota
- 8th – Jessica Quiet , French Pastry Chef from Stowe, Vermont
- 9th – Michelle Henry, Bakery Owner from McAllen, Texas
- 10th – Manja Blackwood, Executive sous chef from Tucson, Arizona
- 11th – Victoria Casinelli, Pastry chef from Shelton, Connecticut
- 12th – Keem Jackson, Pastry Chef from Baltimore, Maryland

=== Elimination Table ===
Place	Contestant	Episode										
Place	Contestant	1	2	3	4	5	6	7	8	9	10	
1	Luke	IN	IN	IN‡	WIN	IN	IN	IN	WIN	LOW	WIN	WINNER
2	Christian	HIGH‡	HIGH	IN	IN	IN‡	WIN	IN	HIGH	WIN	SAFE	RUNNER-UP
2	Clement	IN	IN	IN	HIGH‡	WIN	IN‡	WIN	LOW	HIGH‡	SAFE	RUNNER-UP‡
4	Molly	IN	IN‡	WIN	LOW	LOW	IN	LOW‡	IN	LOW	OUT	
5	Josh	IN	IN	IN	IN	IN	LOW	HIGH	OUT‡			
6	April	IN	IN	WIN	IN	WIN	IN	OUT				
7	Jai	WIN	WIN	IN	IN	IN	OUT					
8	Jessica	IN	HIGH	LOW	IN	OUT						
9	Michelle	IN	LOW	WIN	OUT							
10	Manja	LOW	IN	OUT								
11	Victoria	LOW	OUT									
12	Keem	OUT										

== Season 10 (2024) ==
Season 10 is subtitled "Celebrations" and is themed around springtime holidays or events. This season is again hosted by Jesse Palmer and features judges Nancy Fuller, Kardea Brown, and Duff Goldman.

Episodes
No. overall	No. in season	Title	Original release date
75	1	"Spring Break: Tropical Fun in the Sun"	March 4, 2024
Preheat: To celebrate spring break destinations, Jesse asked the bakers to create desserts modeled after a selected tropical flower and including a tropical ingredient. Anna won, gaining the advantage of first choice of a citrus ingredient in the main heat. Main Heat: The bakers were asked to make cakes depicting an outdoor adventure, including a randomly picked citrus fruit. Alex won the main heat, while Erika was the lowest-ranked and was eliminated.
76	2	"Spring Has Sprung: Celebrate the First Day of Spring"	March 11, 2024
Preheat: The bakers made purple desserts with ube that were themed around either day or night, representing the spring equinox. Robert won, gaining first and exclusive choice of flower in the main heat. Main Heat: The bakers had two and a half hours to make a flower dome cake with a selected type of flower used as both a decoration and flavor. Steven won, and Michael was eliminated.
77	3	"Awards Springing Up Everywhere"	March 18, 2024
Preheat: In honor of spring awards season, the bakers were asked to make a dozen envelope-shaped hand pies using randomly-assigned varieties of fresh berries. Steven won, gaining the advantage to assign all the team pairings in the main heat. Main Heat: In teams of two, the bakers made two-tiered bubble cakes infused with the flavor of an assigned sparkling wine cocktail. Alex and Rochelle won as a team, while Kate won for best individual tier. Zoe and Sandro were the lowest ranked team, of whom Sandro was eliminated.
78	4	"Earth Day: Inspired by Bugs!"	March 18, 2024
Preheat: To celebrate Earth Day, the bakers were asked to make elevated plated desserts inspired by an assigned type of insect or bug. Alex won the preheat. Main Heat: The bakers had two hours to make an Earth Day baked Alaska with an assigned ingredient paired with a geographical region theme. Steven won, while Zoe was eliminated.
79	5	"International Spring Celebrations"	March 25, 2024
Preheat: To celebrate the festival of Holi, the bakers made doughnuts filled with selected Indian flavors: saffron, rose, turmeric, or pistachio. Rochelle won, gaining first choice of partner in the main heat. Main Heat: In teams of two, the bakers had three hours to make Songkran cakes featuring an elephant, the national symbol of Thailand, and a selected flavor: mango, pandan, Thai basil, or coconut. The team of Steven and Anna won. The team of Kate and Sabrina were lowest-ranked, with Sabrina being eliminated.
80	6	"Going to Prom"	April 1, 2024
Preheat: To celebrate a springtime prom, the competitors had 90 minutes to make a corsage made of macarons. The winner was Anna, who gained the advantage to avoid the main heat's twist. Main Heat: The bakers were given two hours to make a tsunami cake shaped like a prom gown and featuring an assigned flavor. When presented to the judges, the tsunami effect was meant to complete the dress. In a twist, the bakers had to add fruit punch flavor somewhere in their cake. The winner was Rochelle. Anna was the lowest ranked and was eliminated.
81	7	"April Showers"	April 8, 2024
Preheat: In an episode themed around April showers and May flowers, the bakers had 90 minutes to make petit fours for a tea party. Alex won, gaining the advantage of a basket of floral molds and piping tips which he could use in the main heat. However, he chose not to use them. Main Heat: To celebrate May Day, the bakers had two hours to make a pull-apart floral wreath made of mini-shortcakes and featuring a maypole. They also selected a required fresh fruit. Kate was the winner. Rochelle was eliminated.
82	8	"Derby Day Celebrations"	April 15, 2024
Preheat: To celebrate the Kentucky Derby, the bakers had 90 minutes to create a dozen eclairs with flavors of selected mint julep variations and bright colors inspired by jockey outfits. Nickey won, gaining exclusive choice of dessert type in the main heat. Main Heat: The bakers were given two hours to make Derby-themed carrot desserts, with roses made from carrots and tempered white chocolate decor. Traditional carrot cake was forbidden. For her advantage, Nickey chose to make a tart, which her competitors were also disallowed from making. Steven won the main heat, while Kate was eliminated.
83	9	"Music Festival"	April 22, 2024
Preheat: Inspired by the Coachella music festival and its desert locale, the bakers made succulent cupcake crowns with cactus flowers. They were assigned desert flavors: prickly pear, chipotle powder, dates, or mesquite flour. Nickey won, gaining a 10 minute head start in the main heat. Main Heat: To celebrate the New Orleans Jazz & Heritage Festival, the bakers had two hours to make jazz-themed entremets with assigned New Orleans snowball syrups: mandarin orange, wild cherry, strawberry, or coffee. Robert was the winner. An elimination was deferred until the next episode.
84	10	"Something Borrowed, Something Old"	April 29, 2024
Sudden Death Bake-Off: As the lowest ranked in the previous heat, Nickey and Alex competed in an elimination bake-off. In an episode themed around a spring wedding, the bakers received an assigned flavor inspiration that was "something borrowed" from the other contestants. Nickey got key lime pie from Robert and Alex got tiramisu from Steven. Ultimately, Nickey won, and Alex was eliminated. Preheat: Inspired by "something old", the judges each picked a family heirloom recipe to revamp. Nancy chose Grammy Carl's sandwich cookies, which went to Robert; Duff chose Mamo's tea cakes, which went to Nickey; and Kardea chose Aunt TC's lemon soda Bundt cake, which went to Steven.
85	11	"The Wedding"	May 6, 2024
Steven was revealed as the winner of the previous episode's preheat, giving him an advantage in the final challenge. Main Heat: In the final challenge, the bakers had five hours to make a three-tiered wedding cake inspired by "something new", the trend of stained glass cakes. With his advantage, Steven chose from three assigned themes: Steven chose flower bouquet, assigning birds to Robert and dragonflies to Nickey. Steven won the title of Spring Baking Champion with a coconut wedding cake with rum soak, macadamia feuilletine and tropical fruit fillings.

=== Contestants ===
- 1st – Steven Tran
- 2/3rd – Robert Gonzalez
- 2/3rd – Nickey Boyd
- 4th – Alexandre “Alex” Bonnefoi
- 5th – Katelyn “Kate” Boutilier
- 6th – Rochelle DeSouza
- 7th – Anna Simeonides
- 8th – Sabrina Courtemanche
- 9th – Zoe Ma
- 10th – Sandro Arotinco
- 11th – Michael Bass
- 12th – Ericka Wells

=== Elimination Table ===
Place	Contestant	Episode										
Place	Contestant	1	2	3	4	5	6	7	8	9	10	11
1	Steven	IN	WIN	IN‡	WIN	WIN	LOW	IN	WIN	HIGH	SAFE	WINNER‡
2	Robert	IN	IN‡	IN	IN	IN	IN	HIGH	LOW	WIN	SAFE	RUNNER-UP
2	Nickey	HIGH	IN	IN	IN	IN	IN	LOW	IN‡	LOW‡	WIN	RUNNER-UP
4	Alex	WIN	IN	WIN	IN‡	HIGH	HIGH	IN‡	HIGH	LOW	OUT	
5	Kate	IN	IN	WIN	IN	LOW	IN	WIN	OUT			
6	Rochelle	IN	LOW	WIN	LOW	HIGH‡	WIN	OUT				
7	Anna	IN‡	HIGH	IN	IN	WIN	OUT‡					
8	Sabrina	HIGH	IN	IN	HIGH	OUT						
9	Zoe	IN	IN	LOW	OUT							
10	Sandro	IN	IN	OUT								
11	Michael	LOW	OUT									
12	Erika	OUT										

== Season 11 (2025) ==
Season 11 is again hosted by Jesse Palmer and features the judging panel of Kardea Brown, Nancy Fuller, and Duff Goldman. The season is subtitled "Magic" and is themed around the concept of a "Little Shop of Spring Magic".

Episodes
No. overall	No. in season	Title	Original release date
86	1	"Welcome to the Little Shop of Spring Magic"	March 10, 2025
Preheat: For their first challenge, the thirteen contestants were given two hours to make a dessert of their choice themed around a flower that symbolized their personality. Priya won the preheat, earning a five minute head start in the main heat. Winner : Priya Winsor Main Heat: The bakers were given two and a half hours to make a honey pie featuring an assigned honey variety and topped with bee-themed 3D décor. Kari won the main heat. It was announced that for medical reasons, Lauren had withdrawn from the competition, so no one else was eliminated in this episode. Winner: Kari Cota Withdrew: Lauren Klein
87	2	"The Magical World of Minecraft"	March 17, 2025
Preheat: In a promotion for A Minecraft Movie, the bakers were asked to make square-shaped fruit entremets featuring an assigned fruit. Lisa won, gaining a "Little Shop" gift card that granted a selection of extra tools in the main heat. Winner: Lisa Clark Main Heat: The bakers were paired in teams of two. Each team made two cakes with complimentary flavors and designs: one representing Minecraft's Overworld and the other representing the Nether. Teams also made an edible portal to connect their cakes. Corey and Lisa were the winning team, and Corey was the individual winner. Paul and Jamie were the lowest ranked team, and Jamie was eliminated. Winner: Corey Jamison Eliminated: Jamie Li
88	3	"The Magic of Spring Colors"	March 24, 2025
Preheat: The bakers had two and a half hours to build a tower with colorful madeleines featuring an assigned tea flavoring. Julian won, receiving the Gift of Immunity, which he could use to shield himself from elimination in one of the next five main heat challenges. Winner: Julian Perrigo-Jimenez Main Heat: The bakers had two and a half hours to make a rainbow cheesecake with an ombré interior using an assigned color and fruit flavor. Corey won the main heat, while Stacy was sent home. Julian did not use his immunity and narrowly avoided elimination with his dish being second lowest-ranked. Winner: Corey Jamison Eliminated: Stacey Flores
89	4	"April Fools': Spring Fake Outs"	March 31, 2025
Preheat: To celebrate April Fools' Day, the bakers were given two and a half hours to make six faux eggs with chocolate shells, containing a baked component and a filling that resembled a yolk. Priya won, gaining the ability to trade assigned dinners with another contestant in the main heat. Winner: Priya Winsor Main Heat: The bakers were given three hours to make a dessert deception that looked like an assigned savory dinner. Lisa was the winner, while Jon’nae was eliminated. Winner: Lisa Clark Eliminated: Jon’nae Smith
90	5	"Spring Forward & Spring Backward"	April 7, 2025
Preheat: Inspired by the Fountain of Youth, the bakers had 90 minutes to make an elevated version of a childhood favorite dessert of their choice. Corey won, earning a Gift of Immunity that he could use in one of the next three main heats. Winner: Cory Jamison Main Heat: The bakers were given two and a half hours to make a "top forward" cake (a cake standing on its side) with a clock face inspired by an assigned clock design. Julian used his Gift of Immunity from episode 3, though the judges stated that he would have won the challenge anyway based on his cake's quality and taste. Raveena was the winner. Kareem was eliminated. Winner: Raveena Oberoi Eliminated: Kareem Youngblood
91	6	"Out with the Old, In with the New"	April 14, 2025
Preheat: The bakers had 90 minutes to make a dessert inspired by an assigned scented candle, accompanied by a sauce or spread in the form of a working votive candle. Kari won, gaining the advantage to assign all desserts in the main heat. Winner: Kari Cota Main Heat: The competitors were divided into Team Carrot Cake and Team Lemon Meringue Pie. Each team baked four assigned dessert types (charlotte russe, Paris–Brest, opera cake, and tiramisu) combined with elements of their team dessert. Desserts of the same type were judged in head-to-head matchups, with the winning team being safe from elimination. The teams ended tied 2–2, and no individual winner was announced. Because the teams were tied, the bakers who lost their head-to-head match were considered for elimination, of whom Julian was sent home. Winner: Raveena Oberoi, Mary-Frances Bahun, Paul Feybesse & Corey Jamison Eliminated: Julian Perrigo-Jimenez
92	7	"The Magic of Spring Foraging"	April 21, 2025
Preheat:The bakers had 90 minutes to make a roll cake with an imprime design of a magical forest creature. They also had to include a citrus fruit that they picked. Lisa won and received a $1000 bonus cash prize. Winner: Lisa Clark Main Heat: The bakers had two and a half hours to make a garden-themed, tiered macaron cake including an assigned fresh vegetable. In the first twist of the season, the bakers had to incorporate Fresno chiles. Corey used his immunity, as this was the final opportunity to use it. Mary-Frances was the winner. Kari was eliminated. Winner: Mary-Frances Bahun Eliminated: Kari Cota
93	8	"Secret Garden"	April 28, 2025
Preheat: In teams of two, the bakers were given two hours to make a Napoleon shaped like an assigned species of butterfly. The team of Mary-Frances and Corey won, gaining the advantage to assign each baker's theme in the main heat. Winner: Mary-Frances Bahun & Corey Jamison Main Heat: The bakers had two hours to make table top cakes (trendy table runner sheet cakes) with assigned themes related to a magical garden. The twist was to incorporate lemongrass. In a first for the series, this challenge was judged blind while the contestants watched from a separate room. Lisa was the winner, and Paul was eliminated. Winner: Lisa Clark Eliminated: Paul Feybesse
94	9	"Floating Islands"	May 5, 2025
Preheat: Jesse Palmer had the final five bakers create floating island desserts with an assigned tropical fruit and a spun sugar cage. The winning dessert was made by Corey. No reward or advantage was announced. Winner: Corey Jamison Main Heat: The bakers were tasked to create an ice cream cake bombe inspired by an assigned flambé dessert with alcohol and featuring "glow-in-the-dark" fluorescent pigments. Mary-Frances won the challenge with her dessert. Corey was eliminated. Winner: Mary-Frances Bahun Eliminated: Corey Jamison
95	10	"The Road to the Finale"	May 12, 2025
Preheat: The final four bakers had two hours to make a fraisier cake with a customization that expressed their personality. Priya won. Raveena and Mary-Frances were the two lowest-ranked and were sent to an elimination bake off. Sudden Death Bake Off: The bottom two bakers had 60 minutes to make a spring dessert of their choice that was personally meaningful to them. Mary-Frances made pavlovas with yuzu curd, and Raveena made cardamom spice cakes. The results were not announced until the next episode.
96	11	"Crowning the Champion"	May 16, 2025
Raveena was revealed as winner of the previous episode's bake-off, and Mary-Frances was eliminated. Main Heat: In the final challenge, the finalists had five hours to create sky high cakes based on Marie Antoinette's extreme hair styles and including a floral flavor of their choice. As winner of the preheat, Priya had the advantage to assign all three hair styles: Priya choose the theme of "spring garden"; she gave "sailing ship" to Raveena and gave "peacock" to Lisa. Priya won the Spring Baking Championship with a topiary garden hairdo chocolate and orange blossom cake with ganache filling.

=== Contestants ===
- 1st – Priya Winsor, from St. Albert, Alberta
- 2/3rd – Raveena Oberoi, from Vancouver, British Columbia
- 2/3rd – Lisa Clark, from Boston, Massachusetts
- 4th – Mary-Frances Bahun, from Calgary, Alberta
- 5th – Corey Jamison, from Washington, D.C.
- 6th – Paul Feybesse, from Vallejo, California
- 7th – Kari Cota, from San Diego, California
- 8th – Julian Perrigo-Jimenez, from Sacramento, California
- 9th – Kareem Youngblood, from Brooklyn, New York
- 10th – Jon’nae "Jaye" Smith, from Atlanta, Georgia
- 11th – Stacy Flores, from Jersey City, New Jersey
- 12th – Jamie Li, from San Mateo, California
- 13th – Lauren Klein, from Freehold, New Jersey

=== Elimination Table ===
Place	Contestant	Episode											
Place	Contestant	1	2	3	4	5	6	7	8	9	10	11	
1	Priya	IN‡	IN	IN	IN‡	IN	LOW	IN	LOW	IN	IN‡	SAFE	WINNER
2	Lisa	IN	HIGH‡	IN	WIN	HIGH	IN	LOW‡	WIN	HIGH	IN	SAFE	RUNNER- UP
2	Raveena	IN	IN	IN	IN	WIN	WIN	HIGH	IN	LOW	RISK	WIN	RUNNER- UP
4	Mary-Frances	IN	IN	IN	HIGH	IN	WIN	WIN	IN‡	WIN	RISK	OUT	
5	Corey	IN	WIN	WIN	IN	IN‡	WIN	IMM	HIGH‡	OUT‡			
6	Paul	IN	LOW	IN	IN	LOW	WIN	IN	OUT				
7	Kari	WIN	IN	IN	IN	IN	IN‡	OUT					
8	Julian	HIGH	IN	LOW‡	IN	IMM	OUT						
9	Kareem	LOW	IN	IN	LOW	OUT							
10	Jon’nae	IN	IN	IN	OUT								
11	Stacy	IN	IN	OUT									
12	Jamie	LOW	OUT										
13	Lauren	WDR											

‡ The contestant won the Preheat challenge for that week.
(WIN) The contestant won the Main Heat challenge.
(WIN) The contestant won a head-to-head contest in the Main Heat team challenge.
(WIN) The contestant won a sudden death bake-off to stay in the competition.
(IMM) The contestant used a Gift of Immunity, protecting them from elimination that week.

== Spring Baking Championship Easter ==
Spring Baking Championship Easter is a spin-off that aired three seasons on Food Network from 2021 to 2023. Host Sunny Anderson (seasons 1–3) asks the competitors to make Easter-themed confections and edible displays to impress the judges Claudia Sandoval (season 1), Jordan Andino (seasons 1–2), Stephanie Boswell (seasons 2–3), and Zac Young (season 3).

== Season 1 ==
=== Contestants ===
- 1st – Ora Beth Mika, from Napa, California
- 2nd/3rd – Elaine Duran, from Kissimmee, Florida
- 2nd/3rd – Gene Shephed, from Washington, D.C.
- 4th – Makana Jarman, from Portland, Oregon
- 5th – Harry Fiebelman, from St. Louis, Missouri
- 6th – Jeremy Davis, from Charlotte, Michigan
- 7th – Charmaine Jones, from Harlem, New York

Place	Contestant	Episode				
Place	Contestant	1	2	3	4	5
1	Ora Beth	IN	IN	IN	IN	WINNER
2/3	Elaine	IN	IN	IN	IN	RUNNER-UP
2/3	Gene	IN	IN	IN	IN	RUNNER-UP
4	Makana	IN	IN	IN	OUT	
5	Harry	IN	IN	OUT		
6	Jeremy	IN	OUT			
7	Charmaine	OUT				

== Season 2 ==
=== Contestants ===
- 1st – Sydney Perry, from Long Island, New York
- 2nd/3rd – Tatiana Kovalenko, from Midland Park, New Jersey
- 2nd/3rd – Brittany Lombardi, from The Bronx, New York
- 4th – Kathleen Faliskie, from Leesburg, Virginia
- 5th – Whitney Ronzello, from Nacogdoches, Texas
- 6th – Sammy Terrana, from Fort Worth, Texas
- 7th – Sean Dwyer, from Naples, Florida
- 8th – Brandon Ting, from Queens, New York

=== Elimination Table ===
Place	Contestant	Episode					
Place	Contestant	1	2	3	4	5	6
1	Sydney	IN	IN	IN	IN	WIN	WINNER
2/3	Tatiana	WIN	IN	IN	IN	IN	RUNNER-UP
2/3	Brittany	IN	IN	WIN	IN	IN	RUNNER-UP
4	Kathleen	IN	IN	IN	WIN	OUT	
5	Whitney	IN	IN	IN	OUT		
6	Sammy	IN	WIN	OUT			
7	Sean	IN	OUT				
8	Brandon	OUT					

== Season 3 ==
=== Contestants ===
- 1st – Henderson Gonzalez, from Miami, Florida
- 2nd/3rd – Sammy Hammer, from Orlando, Florida
- 2nd/3rd – Timothy Hamrah, from Macon, Georgia
- 4th – Kevin Futamachi, from Reno, Nevada
- 5th – Ruchit Harneja, from Houston, Texas
- 6th – Josh Osamor , from San Francisco, California
- 7th – Rachel Mullen, from Memphis, Tennessee
- 8th – Sasha Nary, from Chicago, Illinois

Place	Contestant	Episode					
Place	Contestant	1	2	3	4	5	6
1	Henderson	IN	WIN	IN	IN	IN	WINNER
2/3	Sammy	IN	IN	IN	IN	WIN	RUNNER-UP
2/3	Timothy	IN	IN	IN	IN	IN	RUNNER-UP
4	Kevin	IN	IN	IN	WIN	OUT	
5	Ruchit	WIN	IN	WIN	OUT		
6	Josh	IN	IN	OUT			
7	Rachel	IN	OUT				
8	Sasha	OUT					

== Summer Baking Championship ==
Summer Baking Championship is another seasonal series that follows the format of Spring Baking Championship and is hosted by Jesse Palmer with judges Duff Goldman, Carla Hall and Damaris Phillips. The first season aired in the summer of 2023, followed by a second season in 2024.

== Season 1 ==
Episodes
No. overall	No. in season	Title	Original release date
1	1	"Dockside Desserts"	May 15, 2023
2	2	"Let's Cool Off"	May 15, 2023
3	3	"Summer Fun in the Sun"	May 22, 2023
4	4	"Summer "Fruitastic""	May 29, 2023
5	5	"Beach Day"	June 6, 2023
6	6	"Summer Celebrations"	June 12, 2023
7	7	"Sweets for Barbie"	June 19, 2023
8	8	"Bring the 4th Sweets"	June 26, 2023

=== Contestants ===
- 1st – Zoe Peckich from Pittsburgh, PA
- 2/3rd – Alyssa Alcantara from San Diego, CA
- 2/3rd – Yohann Le Bescond from Ocala, FL
- 4th – Anrika Martin from Kingston, NY
- 5th – John Boyle from Philadelphia, PA
- 6th – Carlos Pena from Las Vegas, NV
- 7th – Ally Radziewicz from Syracuse, NY
- 8th – Kyle Davis from Springfield, MO
- 9th – Kristina Krause from Leesburg, VA
- 10th – Lisa Lu from Healdsburg, CA

=== Elimination Table ===
Place	Contestant	Episode							
Place	Contestant	1	2	3	4	5	6	7	8
1	Zoe	IN	IN	HIGH‡	HIGH	HIGH	HIGH‡	HIGH	WINNER‡
2/3	Alyssa	WIN	LOW	WIN	WIN	IN	LOW	LOW	RUNNER-UP
2/3	Yohann	IN‡	IN	IN	LOW	WIN	WIN	WIN	RUNNER-UP
4	Anrika	IN	IN	IN	IN	LOW	IN	OUT‡	
5	John	HIGH	HIGH	IN	IN	IN‡	OUT		
6	Carlos	IN	IN	IN‡	IN	OUT			
7	Ally	IN	IN	IN	OUT‡				
8	Kyle	LOW	WIN‡	OUT					
9	Kristina	IN	OUT						
10	Lisa	OUT							

== Season 2 ==
Episodes
No. overall	No. in season	Title	Original release date
9	1	"Beachside Delights"	May 13, 2024
10	2	"Summer Cruise"	May 20, 2024
11	3	"Summer Lake Adventure"	May 27, 2024
12	4	"Summer Feelings"	June 3, 2024
13	5	"We're Going Glamping!"	June 10, 2024
14	6	"Southwest Summer Break"	June 17, 2024
15	7	"Shark Week Sweets"	June 24, 2024
16	8	"Big Apple Fireworks"	July 1, 2024

=== Contestants ===
- 1st – Rob Lough from Houston, TX
- 2/3 – Chris Jara from San Antonio, TX
- 2/3 – Stephanie Tucci from Barrie, ON
- 4th – Dominick Miller from Santa Rosa, CA
- 5th – Vonshia Brown from Los Angeles, CA
- 6th – Austin Granados from Winnipeg, MB
- 7th – German Rizzo from Glen Cove, NY
- 8th – Nayibe “Nayi” Renaud from Las Vegas, NV
- 9th – Tara Canaday from Cumberland, ME
- 10th – Karol Zapata from Queens, NY

=== Elimination Table ===
Place	Contestant	Episode							
Place	Contestant	1	2	3	4	5	6	7	8
1	Rob	IN	IN	IN	IN‡	WIN	WIN	WIN	WINNER
2/3	Chris	IN	IN‡	WIN	HIGH	HIGH	HIGH‡	HIGH	RUNNER-UP
2/3	Stephanie	IN	IN	HIGH	WIN	LOW	IN	LOW‡	RUNNER-UP‡
4	Dominick	WIN	LOW	LOW‡	IN	IN‡	LOW	OUT	
5	Vonshia	IN‡	IN	IN	IN	IN	OUT		
6	Austin	IN	WIN	IN	LOW	OUT			
7	German	LOW	HIGH	IN‡	OUT				
8	Nayi	IN	IN	OUT					
9	Tara	HIGH	OUT						
10	Karol	OUT							

== Notes ==
1.The baker who the judges think did the best at the twist received immunity from elimination.
2.Jaleesa and Carolyn won as a team, while Romy won as an individual.
3. Marco Salden from Denver, Colorado competed against Stephon Cook for a spot in the competition in the main heat Season 8 Episode 2, but ultimately lost.
4. Luke and Molly weren’t eliminated in the semi-finale but were in a bake off to get secure a spot in the final main heat.
