= Holiday Baking Championship =

American food reality television series

- Presented by: Bobby Deen; Jesse Palmer
- Judges: Nancy Fuller; Duff Goldman; Lorraine Pascale; Carla Hall; Kardea Brown; Molly Yeh
- Country of origin: United States
- No. of seasons: 11
- No. of episodes: 84 (list of episodes)

Production
- Running time: 42-84 minutes

Original release
- Network: Food Network
- Release: November 9, 2014 – present

Holiday Baking Championship is an American cooking competition series produced by Triage Entertainment and aired on Food Network. It airs from early November through late December, covering the U.S Thanksgiving and Christmas season. The first episode premiered on November 9, 2014, and it has become a yearly competition with several spin-off shows, including Spring Baking Championship, Halloween Baking Championship, Kids Baking Championship, Wedding Cake Championship and Summer Baking Championship.

== Rounds ==
Each episode has two rounds. The first round is the "Preliminary Heat" where the bakers must create small pastries centered around a holiday theme.

The person who wins the pre-heat gets an advantage going into the next round and aren't told about it until the second round theme is announced. The advantage usually varies.

The second round is the "Main Heat" where the contestants get more time than the first round to create a larger confection (in size or quantity) that sticks to the holiday theme of the episode. Partway through the main heat, there's often a curveball thrown in that has the bakers adapt or change their plans. The winner of the "Main Heat" advances to the next episode while the baker with the worst dish is eliminated. The 3 bakers remaining will compete in the final "Main Heat" challenge.

== Host and judges ==
The show's first three seasons were hosted by Bobby Deen. Jesse Palmer has been host of the program since season four.

Baker Duff Goldman (Ace of Cakes) and, until season 13, pastry chef Nancy Fuller (Farmhouse Rules) serve as permanent judges of the show. Lorraine Pascale (former UK television chef and model) was a judge for the first six seasons.

For season seven, Carla Hall replaced Pascale on the judges' panel, joining Fuller and Goldman, until season 11. For season 12, Kardea Brown joined the judges' panel, taking Hall's place. For season 13, Molly Yeh took over for Fuller.

== Episodes ==
Season	Episodes	Season premiere	Season finale
1	6	November 9, 2014	December 14, 2014
2	8	November 1, 2015	December 20, 2015
3	8	November 6, 2016	December 25, 2016
4	7	November 6, 2017	December 18, 2017
5	7	November 5, 2018	December 17, 2018
6	8	November 4, 2019	December 23, 2019
7	8	November 2, 2020	December 21, 2020
8	8	November 1, 2021	December 20, 2021
9	8	November 7, 2022	December 19, 2022
10	8	November 6, 2023	December 18, 2023
11	8	November 4, 2024	December 16, 2024
12	8	November 3, 2025	December 22, 2025
13	8	November 2, 2026	December 21, 2026
