= Worst Cooks in America season 21 =

Worst Cooks in America
- Season 21
- Judges: Anne Burrell; Carla Hall
- No. of contestants: 14
- Winner: Amber Leverette
- Winning mentor: Carla Hall
- Runner-up: Cameron Bartlett
- No. of episodes: 8

Release
- Original network: Food Network
- Original release: January 3 – February 28, 2021

Season chronology
- ← Previous; Season 20 Next → Season 22

Worst Cooks in America 21, is the twenty-first season of the American competitive reality television series Worst Cooks in America. It premiered on Food Network on January 3, 2021 and concluded on February 28, 2021. Amber Leverette was the winner of this season, with Cameron Bartlett as the runner-up.

== Format ==
Worst Cooks in America is an American reality television series in which contestants (referred to as "recruits") with poor cooking skills undergo a culinary boot camp for the chance to win $25,000 and a Food Network cooking set. The recruits are trained on the various basic cooking techniques including baking, knife skills, temperature, seasoning and preparation. Each episode features two core challenges: the Skills Drill, which tests their grasp of basic techniques demonstrated by the chef mentors, and the Main Dish Challenge, where they must apply those skills to recreate or invent a more complex dish under specific guidelines. The weakest performer is eliminated at the end of each episode. The final two contestants prepare a restaurant-quality, three-course meal for a panel of food critics, who evaluate the dishes based on taste, presentation, and overall improvement.

== Judges ==
Carla Hall joins Anne Burrell to host season 21. The season debut on January 3, 2021, with a 90-minute premiere. Immediately following, spin-off companion series Worst Cooks in America: Dirty Dishes begins its first-ever run. The show sees former boot camp contestants and comedians commenting on past episodes.

An additional twist added this season is the "Danger Zone," in which the worst recruit on each team in the Skill Drill must cook their Main Dish at the stations used by Burrell and Hall in demonstrating the recipe, giving the mentors the ability to keep a close eye on them as they cook.

== Recruits ==
Contestant	Age	Hometown	Occupation	Team	Status
Amber Leverette	37	Banner Elk, North Carolina	Bartender	Carla	Winner on February 28, 2021
Cameron Bartlett	20	Norman, Oklahoma	Student	Anne	Runner-up on February 28, 2021
Jonathan "JJ" Hurt	35	Atlanta, Georgia	Tech Support Supervisor	Anne	Finalist on February 28, 2021
Chandali Gullick	29	Wichita, Kansas	Customer Service	Carla	Finalist on February 28, 2021
McKayla Carter	21	Blackshear, Georgia	Model	Anne	Eliminated on February 14, 2021
Tiffany Billingsly	35	Greenwood, Indiana	Music Teacher	Carla	Eliminated on February 14, 2021
Ayesha Dwyer	43	Wadsworth, Illinois	Children's Book Author	Carla	Eliminated on January 31
Laura Marie Moore	23	Los Angeles, California	NHL Cheerleader	Anne	Eliminated on January 31
Joey Kinsley	26	Rocky River, Ohio	Digital Marketing Specialist	Carla	Eliminated on January 17, 2021
Mo Nooreldin		Kirkland, Washington	Dental Assistant	Anne	Eliminated on January 17, 2021
Stephanie James	40	Chicago, Illinois	Postal Clerk	Anne	Eliminated on January 10, 2021
Watik Aleem		Aurora, Colorado	Army Veteran	Carla	Eliminated on January 10, 2021
Jonathan Hanna		New York, New York	Hand Model	Carla	Eliminated on January 3, 2021
Joy Blessing	65	Jacksonville, Florida	Wedding Officiant	Anne	Eliminated on January 3, 2021

== Elimination Chart ==
Team Anne
Team Carla

* Initially a member of the other team

Rank	Contestant	Episode							
Rank	Contestant	1	2	3	4	5	6	7	8
1	Amber	WIN	IN	WIN	IN	BTM	IMM	IN	WINNER
2	Cameron	BTM	BTM	IN	BTM	WIN	WIN	IN	RUNNER-UP
3	JJ	WIN	IN	IN	WIN	BTM	BTM	IN	FINALIST
4	Chandali*	IN	IN	BTM	SWAP	IN	WIN	IN	FINALIST
5	McKayla*	BTM	WIN	BTM	SWAP	IN	OUT		
6	Tiffany	IN	BTM	IN	BTM	WIN	OUT		
7	Ayesha	IN	IN	IN	WIN	OUT			
8	Laura	IN	IN	WIN	IN	OUT			
9	Joey	IN	IN	OUT					
10	Mo	IN	WIN	OUT					
11	Stephanie	IN	OUT						
12	Watik	IN	OUT						
13	Jonathan	OUT							
14	Joy	OUT							

Key
(WINNER) This contestant won the competition and was crowned "Best of the Worst".
(RUNNER-UP) The contestant was the runner-up in the finals of the competition.
(FINALIST) The contestant was a finalist in the finals of the competition.
(WIN) The contestant did the best on their team in the week's Main Dish challenge or Skill Drill and was considered the winner.
(IMM) The contestant won immunity and was safe from elimination in the week's Main Dish Challenge.
(BTM) The contestant was selected as one of the bottom entries in the Main Dish challenge, but was not eliminated.
(SWAP) The contestant get switched by a mentor to the other team.
(OUT) The contestant lost that week's Main Dish challenge and was out of the competition.

== Episodes ==
No. overall	No. in season	Title	Original release date
153	1	"Home Cooking and Date Night"	January 3, 2021
154	2	"Farm-to-Table"	January 10, 2021
155	3	"Sauce Boss"	January 17, 2021
156	4	"Between Two Buns"	January 24, 2021
157	5	"Hook, Line and Sink 'Em"	January 31, 2021
158	6	"Bonkers for Baked Goods"	February 14, 2021
159	7	"This Ain't No Yolk"	February 21, 2021
160	8	"Fight for Finale"	February 28, 2021
