= Keya Wingfield =

Indian American chef and entrepreneur

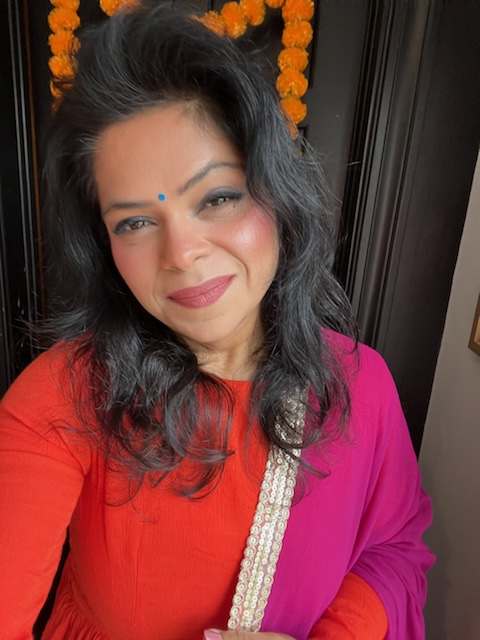
- Born: Keya Desai; Mumbai, India
- Education: J. Sargeant Reynolds Community College
- Occupations: Chef, entrepreneur
- Known for: Winning Food Network's Spring Baking Championship Season 7

Keya Wingfield is an Indian American chef and entrepreneur based in Richmond, Virginia.

== Early life and education ==
Wingfield was born and raised in Mumbai, India. She moved to the U.S. with her husband David who is a native Virginian.

Wingfield has an associate's degree in culinary and pastry arts from J. Sargeant Reynolds Community College in Richmond.

== Career ==
Wingfield won Food Network's Spring Baking Championship Season 7 in 2021.

Wingfield runs a snack company that sells foods with unique flavors of India in grocery stores and online. She also runs a bakery.

Wingfield writes food-related articles for various media outlets.

Wingfield is on the board of directors of Birdhouse Farmers Market, a 501(c)(4) non-profit organization in Richmond.

== Personal life ==
Wingfield's son died from a rare respiratory illness at 55 days of age in 2021.
