= J. Sargeant Reynolds Community College =

Multi-campus public college in Virginia, US

Coordinates: 37°41′38.4″N 77°52′51.7″W

Reynolds Community College
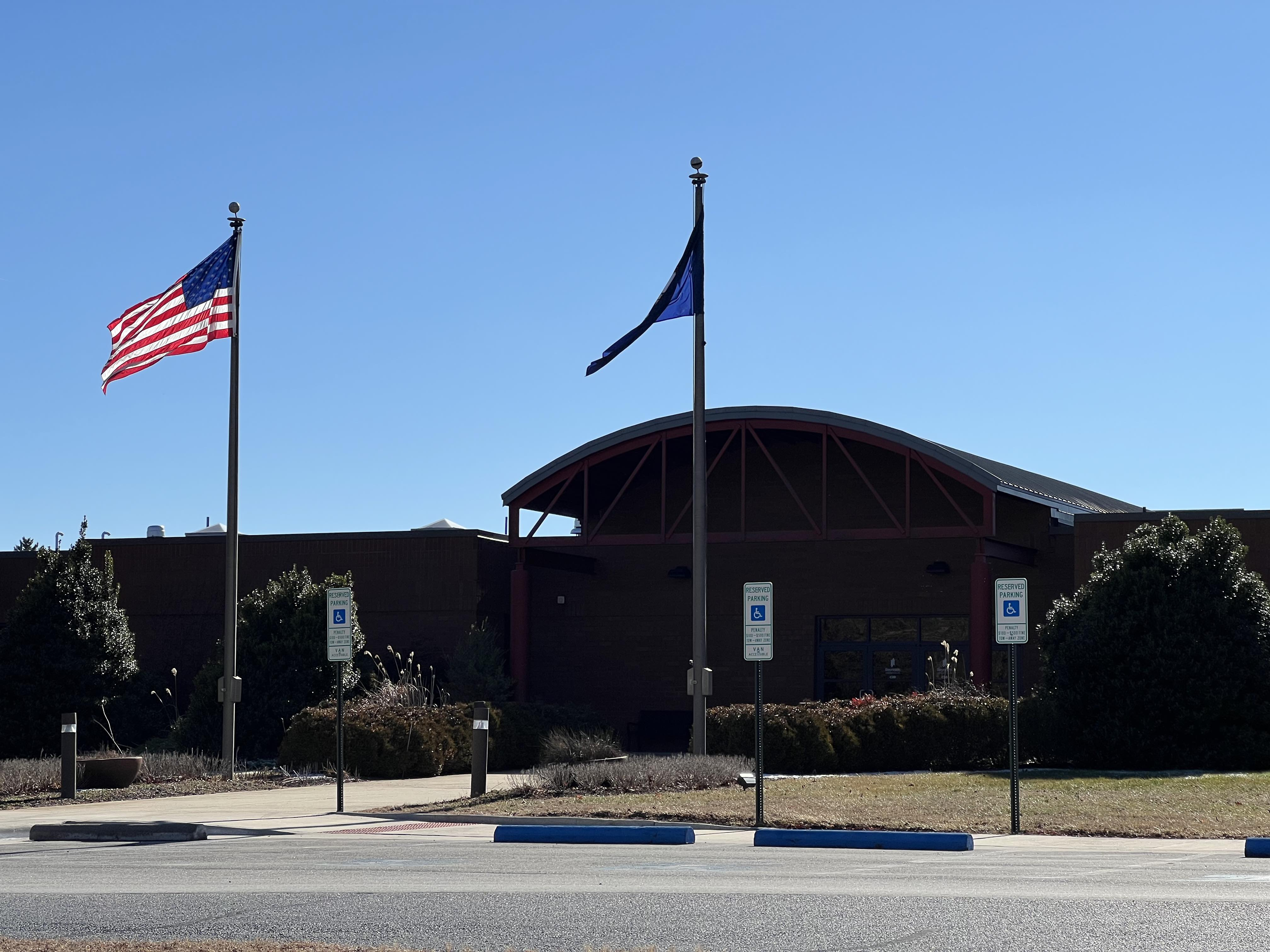
- J. Sargeant Reynolds Community College, Goochland Campus
- Type: Public community College
- Established: 1972; 54 years ago
- Parent institution: Virginia Community College System
- Endowment: $11.3 million (2019)
- President: Paula P. Pando
- Students: 7,527 (2022)
- Location: Richmond, Virginia, United States
- Colors: Red and gray
- Nickname: Red Hawks
- Website: www.reynolds.edu
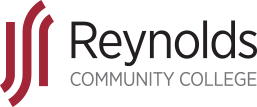

J. Sargeant Reynolds Community College is a public community college in Virginia with four campuses: Parham Road Campus in Henrico County, Downtown Campus in Richmond, Goochland Campus in Goochland Courthouse, Virginia, and The Kitchens at Reynolds in Richmond. Named for Lieutenant Governor J. Sargeant Reynolds, Reynolds is a member of the Virginia Community College System.

The college offers 25 occupational/technical associate degree programs, 9 occupational/technical certificate programs, 5 transfer programs, and 41 career studies certificate programs requiring less than one-year of full-time study. 97% of the college's programs offer at least one class through distance learning. Paula P. Pando has served as president since September 2018.

== Campuses ==
Reynolds has four campuses: Downtown, Parham Road, Goochland, and The Kitchens at Reynolds.

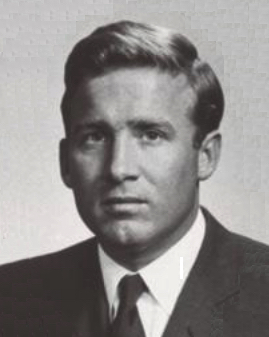
J. Sargeant Reynolds, the college's namesake, served as 30th Lieutenant Governor of the Commonwealth of Virginia.

=== Downtown campus ===
The Downtown Campus is housed in a modern, high-rise structure at Seventh and Jackson Streets, having moved in the fall of 1981 from leased facilities in the 100 block of East Grace Street. In the fall of 1995 a major addition to this facility was completed, adding 84,000 square feet (7,800 m^{2}) to the existing structure. A six-story parking deck is adjacent to the DTC. This campus is located on or near (1-3 blocks) many city (GRTC) buses.

=== Parham Road campus ===
In September 1974, the Parham Road Campus opened in a newly constructed, contemporary building located on a 105-acre (0.42 km^{2}) site in northern Henrico County. A second instructional building was completed on this suburban campus in time for the opening of classes in the fall of 1980. A three-story structure adjacent to the Parham Road Campus houses executive and central administrative offices. In the fall of 2008, the Parham campus opened the Massey Library Technology Center, named for Ivor & Maureen Massey.

=== Goochland campus ===
An instructional facility at the Goochland Campus was completed in the fall of 1981. A major addition to the Goochland Campus opened in Spring 2001, making this the college's third comprehensive campus. The Goochland Campus offers programs in horticulture, automotive and diesel mechanics, welding and equine management.

=== The Kitchens at Reynolds ===
The Kitchens at Reynolds opened in July 2020 in the East End of Richmond. As a front door to career advising and assistance with financial aid and enrollment, the Kitchens is a convenient neighborhood access point to all of Reynolds' academic and workforce offerings, including culinary arts, hospitality, and small business entrepreneurship. The facility houses teaching kitchens, a demonstration kitchen with theater seating, urban greenhouse, and flexible classroom spaces for General Education courses and workforce training instruction.

== Academics ==
The college offers 25 two-year occupational/technical programs, 9 certificate programs and 41 career studies certificate programs requiring less than one year of full-time study.

== Notable alumni ==
- Amir Sadollah, professional mixed martial artist
- Keya Wingfield, Indian American chef
