= Worst Bakers in America =

American food reality television series

- Genre: Food reality television
- Judges: Duff Goldman; Lorraine Pascale; Jason Smith
- Country of origin: United States
- Original language: English
- No. of seasons: 2
- No. of episodes: 11

Production
- Producer: Optomen
- Running time: 41 minutes

Original release
- Network: Food Network
- Release: October 2, 2016 – August 17, 2019

Related
- Worst Cooks in America

Worst Bakers in America is an American cooking reality competition television series that aired on Food Network, presented by chefs Duff Goldman and Lorraine Pascale. The series is a spin-off of Worst Cooks in America.

The first season started on October 2, 2016. The second season started on July 22, 2019, with Jason Smith replacing Duff Goldman.

== Season 1 (2016) ==
=== Recruits ===
Contestant	Hometown	Status
Carla Johnson (Note: Carla Johnson previously competed on the fourth season of Worst Cooks in America.)	Las Vegas, Nevada	Winner on November 6, 2016
Samantha Brown	Louisville, Kentucky	Runner-up on November 6, 2016
Stephanie Garcia	Roseville, California	Eliminated on October 30, 2016
David Rosenberg (Note: David Rosenberg previously competed on the sixth season of Worst Cooks in America.)	Las Vegas, Nevada	Eliminated on October 30, 2016
Carey Westbrook	Los Angeles, California	Eliminated on October 23, 2016
Anthony Lee	Reseda, California	Eliminated on October 23, 2016
Judy Welch	San Antonio, Texas	Eliminated on October 16, 2016
Lizzy Lu	Los Angeles, California	Eliminated on October 16, 2016
Ryan Neiman	Chicago, Illinois	Eliminated on October 9, 2016
Jesse Wyum	Rutland, North Dakota	Eliminated on October 9, 2016
Shante Randolph	Acworth, Georgia	Eliminated on October 2, 2016
Kimberly Worthy	Atlanta, Georgia	Eliminated on October 2, 2016

=== Contestant progress ===
- Red: Team Lorraine
- Blue: Team Duff

No.	Contestant	1	2	3	4	5	6
1	Carla	IN	WIN	IN	BTM	WIN	WINNER
2	Samantha	WIN	IN	WIN	WIN	WIN	RUNNER-UP
3	Stephanie	IN	IN	BTM	WIN	OUT	
4	David	IN	WIN	IN	BTM	OUT	
5	Carey	IN	IN	BTM	OUT		
6	Anthony	BTM	BTM	WIN	OUT		
7	Judy	BTM	BTM	OUT			
8	Lizzy	WIN	IN	OUT			
9	Ryan	IN	OUT				
10	Jesse	IN	OUT				
11	Shante	OUT					
12	Kimberly	OUT					

(WINNER) The contestant won the competition.
(RUNNER-UP) The contestant made it to the finale, but did not win.
(WIN) The contestant won the challenge for that week.
(IN) The contestant performed well enough to move on to the next week.
(BTM) The contestant was one of the selection committee's least favorites for that week, but was not eliminated.
(OUT) The contestant was the selection committee's least favorite for that week, and was eliminated.

== Season 2 (2019) ==
=== Recruits ===
Contestant	Hometown	Status
Melody Pfeffer	Haubstadt, Indiana	Winner on August 19, 2019
Christopher Scott	Mishawaka, Indiana	Runner-up on August 19, 2019
Mary Katherine Carlisle	Tallassee, Alabama	Eliminated on August 13, 2019
Dijonnae "Juicy" Wells	Los Angeles, California	Eliminated on August 13, 2019
Lanette Robinson	Decatur, Georgia	Eliminated on August 5, 2019
Paul Keating	Newport Beach, California	Eliminated on August 5, 2019
Drew Koch	Chicago, Illinois	Eliminated on July 29, 2019
Louisa Sharamatyan (Note: Louisa Sharamatyan previously competed on the twentieth season of Worst Cooks in America.)	Glendale, California	Eliminated on July 29, 2019

=== Contestant progress ===
- Red: Team Lorraine
- Blue: Team Jason

No.	Contestant	1	2	3	4	5
1	Melody	IN	IN	WIN	WIN	WINNER
2	Chris	BTM	IN	BTM	WIN	RUNNER-UP
3	Mary Katherine	WIN	WIN	BTM	OUT	
4	Juicy	IN	BTM	WIN	OUT	
5	Lanette	BTM	BTM	OUT		
6	Paul	WIN	WIN	OUT		
7	Drew	BTM	OUT			
8	Louisa	BTM	OUT			

(WINNER) The contestant won the competition.
(RUNNER-UP) The contestant made it to the finale, but did not win.
(WIN) The contestant won the challenge for that week.
(IN) The contestant performed well enough to move on to the next week.
(BTM) The contestant was one of the selection committee's least favorites for that week, but was not eliminated.
(OUT) The contestant was the selection committee's least favorite for that week, and was eliminated.
