= Girl Meets Farm =

- Genre: Cooking show; Food reality television
- Starring: Molly Yeh
- Country of origin: United States
- Original language: English
- No. of seasons: 15
- No. of episodes: 174

Production
- Producer: Bodega Pictures
- Running time: 22:00

Original release
- Network: Food Network
- Release: June 24, 2018 – present

Girl Meets Farm is an American cooking show that airs on Food Network, and is presented by cookbook author Molly Yeh. The series features Yeh cooking Midwestern farm meals sometimes influenced by her Jewish and Chinese heritage, primarily at her farm on the Minnesota-North Dakota border.

Girl Meets Farm officially premiered on June 24, 2018. The show was repeatedly renewed so, as of June 2025, there have been 15 seasons of 174 episodes.

== Episodes ==
=== Season 1 (2018) ===
No. overall	No. in season	Title	Original release date
1	1	"Farm Brunch Anniversary"	June 24, 2018
2	2	"New Farm Traditions (Note: "New Farm Traditions" was produced as the sixth episode, but it aired as the second episode.)"	July 1, 2018
3	3	"Girl's Brunch"	July 8, 2018
4	4	"Baby Shower"	July 15, 2018
5	5	"Mom Comes to Town"	July 22, 2018
6	6	"Farm Suppers"	July 29, 2018
7	7	"Chinese Family Faves"	August 5, 2018

=== Season 2 (2018) ===
No. overall	No. in season	Title	Original release date
8	1	"Harvest Party"	November 11, 2018
9	2	"Thanksgiving"	November 18, 2018
10	3	"Entertaining the Girls"	November 25, 2018
11	4	"Holiday Spirit"	December 2, 2018
12	5	"Apple Harvest"	December 9, 2018
13	6	"Mom on the Farm"	December 16, 2018
14	7	"Ladies Who Brunch"	December 30, 2018
15	8	"Healthy New Year"	January 8, 2019
16	9	"Pizza Friday"	January 13, 2019
17	10	"Pantry Faves"	January 20, 2019
18	11	"Chinese New Year"	January 27, 2019
19	12	"Big Game"	February 3, 2019
20	13	"Birthday Boys"	February 10, 2019

=== Season 3 (2019) ===
No. overall	No. in season	Title	Original release date
21	1	"New Classics"	March 31, 2019
22	2	"Make Ahead Meals"	April 2, 2019
23	3	"Taco Night Twist"	April 5, 2019
24	4	"Sprint Feast"	April 13, 2019
25	5	"Molly's Baby Shower"	April 21, 2019
26	6	"Generational Goodies"	April 21, 2019

=== Season 4 (2019) ===
No. overall	No. in season	Title	Original release date
27	1	"New Mom Life"	September 15, 2019
28	2	"Jewish New Year"	September 22, 2019
29	3	"Girl Meets Grill"	September 29, 2019
30	4	"Midwest Octoberfest"	October 6, 2019
31	5	"Wheat Harvest"	October 13, 2019
32	6	"Falafel Night"	October 20, 2019
33	7	"Halloween"	October 27, 2019

=== Season 5 ===
No. overall	No. in season	Title	Original release date
34	1	"Brunch All Day"	
35	2	"Playdate"	
36	3	"Middle Italy"	
37	4	"The Big Till"	
38	5	"Chinese Family Favourite"	
39	6	"The Hockey Game!"	
40	7	"Date Night"	
41	8	"Curling Club"	
42	9	"Spring Is Springing!"	
43	10	"Happy Passover!"	
44	11	"Hawaii Farm'O"	
45	12	"Nick;s Trombone Choir"	
46	13	"Midwest Mex"	
