= Carla Hall =

American chef and television personality

- Hall in 2026
- Born: May 12, 1964 (age 62); Nashville, Tennessee, U.S.
- Education: Howard University; L'Academie de Cuisine (Gaithersburg, Maryland)
- Spouse: Matthew Lyons (m. 2006)
- Culinary career
- Television shows
- Top Chef: New York; Top Chef: All-Stars; The Chew (2011–2018); Holiday Baking Championship (2020–present)

Carla Hall (born May 12, 1964) is an American chef, television personality, and former model.

She appeared in the fifth and eighth seasons of Top Chef, Bravo's cooking competition show. She was a co-host on The Chew, a one-hour talk show centered on food from all angles, which premiered on ABC in September 2011.

== Early life and education ==
Hall was born and raised in Nashville, Tennessee. Hall graduated from Hillsboro High School.

She graduated from Howard University's Business School with a degree in accounting in 1986. She then worked at Price Waterhouse in Tampa, Florida, and became a Certified Public Accountant. Hall hated her job and left after two years.

=== Modeling career ===
Hall then spent several years working as a model on the runways of Paris, Milan and London. During this time, she decided to pursue a culinary career.

== Career ==
=== Early chef career ===
Upon returning to the United States, Hall moved to Washington, D.C. When Hall brought some leftover sandwiches to her friend's office, and the friend's coworkers all wanted her to come again, she decided to start a lunch delivery service called the Lunch Bunch. After four years, she enrolled in L'Academie de Cuisine in Bethesda, Maryland, graduating with a Culinary Career Training certificate. From here, she went on to serve an externship at the Henley Park Hotel, where she was then promoted to sous chef. By 1999, Hall was the executive chef at the Garden Cafe in the State Plaza Hotel, a sister hotel. She then served as executive chef of the Washington Club, a private social club.

=== Catering business ===
In 2001, Hall started her own catering company, Alchemy Caterers, based in Wheaton, Maryland. Hall remains in charge of the company, which she renamed Alchemy by Carla Hall. Hall has written the cookbook Cooking with Love: Comfort Food that Hugs You.

=== Top Chef ===
Hall's big break came in 2008, when she was selected to be a contestant on Top Chef: New York. In the beginning, her dishes finished somewhere in the middle in most episodes, but she had the top-rated dish for the Thanksgiving challenge. After Episode 10, she wowed the judges with her crawfish gumbo, going on to win Super Bowl XLIII tickets for this victory. After this, she won two more challenges and was in the top for several others. Most notably, she impressed Jacques Pépin, who said he could "die happy" after eating her fresh peas, and Emeril Lagasse, who said he loved her gumbo. However, in the final challenge in New Orleans, she and Stefan Richter ended as runners-up to champion Hosea Rosenberg.

On the show, Hall gained popularity for her personality, although she did not win Fan Favorite in her season. She became known for her call-and-response catch phrase "Hootie Hoo!", a tradition she and her husband had whenever trying to locate one another in public. Hall also became known on Top Chef for her philosophy of "cooking with love", which she defined as putting one's own care and warmth into food. She believes that if one is happy and calm while cooking, then this will show in the food, making it much better, whereas if one feels otherwise, it will degrade their cuisine. For this reason, she says that, “If you're not in a good mood, the only thing you should make is a reservation."

Hall was part of the cast of Top Chef: All-Stars, the eighth season of the show, which consisted of participants from past seasons. She performed well in this season, which included demonstrating her chicken pot pie recipe on Late Night with Jimmy Fallon. Hall finished fifth overall in the competition, but was awarded "Fan Favorite" for the season by viewers of the show, which included beating out Fabio Viviani, who was voted Fan Favorite over Hall when they both appeared in Season 5.

=== The Chew ===
Since the first show that aired on September 26, 2011, Hall had been one of the five co-hosts on The Chew, a one-hour show on ABC centered on food from all angles. Hall remained a cohost of the show until its cancellation in 2018.

=== Restaurant ===
In 2014, Hall launched a Kickstarter campaign where she raised $264,703 that exceeded her $250,000 goal from 1550 backers for the opening of her restaurant. The restaurant, Carla Hall's Southern Kitchen, opened June 17, 2016, in Brooklyn, New York. The restaurant closed in August 2017.

=== Media appearances ===
Hall appeared on the May 3, 2009, cover of the Washington Post Magazine, on a feature called "Fit for Fame", about still exercising while being famous.

She portrayed a version of herself named "Spaghetti Scientist Carla Hall" in the BoJack Horseman episode "That Went Well". She voiced Mpishi the harrier hawk in a season 2 episode of Disney Junior's The Lion Guard titled "Ono and the Egg". She also voiced the president in Season 1, Episode 5, titled "A Grilled Cheese for the Big Cheese!" from Nickelodeon's animated series Butterbean's Café.

In 2016, Hall made a cameo appearance in Fox's The Passion: New Orleans as a food truck operator.

In 2018, Hall made a guest appearance on ABC's soap opera General Hospital, playing the Quartermaine family's cook.

Hall has appeared as a judge on Food Network's Halloween Baking Championship. For the 2020 season, she served as both a judge and the host. Hall appeared on Season 7 on Food Network's Holiday Baking Championship as a judge as a replacement for Lorraine Pascal, who could not make it due to COVID-19 restrictions that were in place at the time of filming.

In 2020, Hall appeared as a judge in the Channel 4 competition series Crazy Delicious. The show took place on an edible set and was hosted by British comedian Jayde Adams alongside chefs and fellow judges Heston Blumenthal and Niklas Ekstedt.

As of 2020, Hall is currently with Sesame Street characters Cookie Monster and Gonger in a series of segments called Snack Chat.

In 2021, she appeared in Antiques Roadshow Celebrity Edition, episode 2.

In 2021, she hosted Worst Cooks in America with Anne Burrell, and is a host and judge on Best Baker in America.

In 2022, she was the headliner judge for the National Gingerbread House Competition.

In 2025 she was a judge on Next Level Baker.

== Personal life ==
Hall lives in Washington, D.C. She married Matthew Lyons in 2006. She has a stepson Noah.
