= Spring Baking Championship =

American food reality television series

- Genre: Food reality television
- Presented by: Bobby Deen; Jesse Palmer; Ali Khan; Clinton Kelly; Molly Yeh
- Judges: Nancy Fuller; Duff Goldman; Lorraine Pascale; Kardea Brown
- Country of origin: United States
- Original language: English
- No. of seasons: 11
- No. of episodes: 96

Production
- Producer: LEG
- Running time: 41 minutes

Original release
- Network: Food Network
- Release: April 26, 2015 – present

Related
- Holiday Baking Championship

Spring Baking Championship is an American cooking reality competition television series that airs on Food Network. It was originally presented by chef Bobby Deen with fellow Food Network chefs Nancy Fuller, Duff Goldman and Lorraine Pascale serving as judges. All four chefs also appeared in the same roles on Holiday Baking Championship; and similar to that competition, the grand prize for the winner of this competition is also $50,000.

The first season of Spring Baking Championship premiered on April 25, 2015. The second season of the series premiered on April 10, 2016, and concluded on May 15, 2016. The third season premiered on March 12, 2017, with Jesse Palmer replacing Deen as host. The fourth season premiered on March 12, 2018, with Ali Khan replacing Palmer as host. The fifth season premiered on March 18, 2019, with Clinton Kelly replacing Khan as host. The series was renewed for a sixth season premiering on March 9, 2020. The seventh season of the show premiered on February 22, 2021, with Khan returning as host and Kardea Brown replacing Pascale at the judges' table. Molly Yeh took over as host for the eighth season, premiering February 28, 2022. Jesse Palmer returned to host for the ninth season premiering March 6, 2023.

== Format ==
The series format includes two rounds in each episode. The first round is the "PreHeat" where the contestants must bake something centered around a specific theme. The winner of the first round gets an advantage going into the next round.

The second round is the "Main Heat" where the contestants create a larger confection that often follows along the same vein as the pre-heat theme. Partway through the main heat, a twist is revealed that the bakers must incorporate into their final product. The winner of the "Main Heat" advances to the next episode while the baker with the worst dish is eliminated. The three bakers remaining will compete in the final "Main Heat" challenge.
