= Nancy Fuller =

American chef and businesswoman

- Born: March 27, 1949 (age 76); Claverack, New York, US
- Education: Santa Ana College
- Culinary career
- Cooking style: Farm cooking
- Television shows: Clash of the Grandmas; Farmhouse Rules; Holiday Baking Championship; Spring Baking Championship
- Website: www.fullerfarmer.com

Nancy Fuller (also known as Nancy Fuller Ginsberg or Nancy Ginsberg; born March 27, 1949) is an American chef and businesswoman from Claverack, New York. She is the co-owner of Ginsberg's Foods, and the host of the Food Network television series Farmhouse Rules. She also serves as a judge on the Food Network cooking competition series Clash of the Grandmas, Holiday Baking Championship and Spring Baking Championship.

== Personal life ==
Fuller lives in the Hudson Valley of New York with her husband David Ginsberg. She leases out her dairy farm in Copake, New York. She has six children and thirteen grandchildren.
