= Molly Yeh =

American chef (born 1989)

- Born: May 22, 1989 (age 37); Glenview, Illinois, U.S.
- Education: Juilliard School (BM)
- Spouse: Nick Hagen (m. 2014)
- Children: 2
- Father: John Bruce Yeh
- Website: mynameisyeh.com

Molly Yeh (born May 22, 1989) is an American cookbook author, television personality, restaurateur, and blogger. She is the host of the Food Network cooking show Girl Meets Farm. She is trained as a musician and is a graduate of the Juilliard School, but when she moved to her husband-to-be's family farm, she began devoting time to a food blog that evolved into her cooking show and subsequent cookbooks and a restaurant.

== Early life ==
Yeh was born and raised in Glenview, Illinois, to Jody (née Shinbrod) and clarinetist John Bruce Yeh. Her mother is Jewish, and her father is Chinese. She has an older sister who is a chef, as well as a younger half sister.

Yeh attended Glenbrook South High School and the Midwest Young Artists Conservatory, where she was a member of two percussion ensembles—The Rattan Trio and Beat 3—that won consecutive gold medals (2004 and 2005) in the junior division of the Fischoff National Chamber Music Competition. She kept journals from a young age that she turned into her blog in 2009.

After high school, she moved to New York City to attend the Juilliard School, where she was editorial assistant and writer at The Juilliard Journal; in 2011, she earned a Bachelor of Music degree in percussion.

== Career ==
After Yeh and her husband-to-be Nick Hagen moved to his family farm outside East Grand Forks, Minnesota near the North Dakota/Minnesota border in 2013, Yeh began devoting more time to her food blog, which included personal stories about her life on the farm. The blog gained attention in part due to Yeh's artistic food photography becoming popular on Pinterest; in 2015 she was named "Food Blogger of the Year" by Saveur. In October 2016, Yeh published her first book, Molly on the Range: Recipes and Stories from An Unlikely Life on a Farm (Rodale Books), for which she won the Judges' Choice IACP Cookbook Award in 2017. Like her blog, the book combines Yeh's recipes and food photography with autobiographical stories.

Yeh began hosting her cooking show Girl Meets Farm on Food Network, debuting on June 24, 2018. The series is recorded at Yeh's farm and features Midwestern cuisine as well as elements from her Chinese and Jewish heritage. Her show has been repeatedly renewed so, as of June 2025, there have been 15 seasons. In November 2018, she was a guest co-host on From the Top, a podcast showcasing young classical musicians. Yeh had previously appeared on the show twice as a teenager, in 2004 and 2007. She hosted the Food Network competition shows Ben and Jerry's Clash of the Cones in 2021 and the eighth season of Spring Baking Championship, which premiered on February 28, 2022.

In 2022, Yeh opened Bernie's, a café restaurant in East Grand Forks specializing in Midwestern dishes with Scandinavian and Jewish influences.

In 2025, Yeh wrote Sweet Farm!, a desserts-only cookbook, featuring over 100 happy, whimsical recipes that blend her Jewish, Chinese, and Midwestern roots. It includes signature treats like black sesame babka, frosted tahini cookies, and rhubarb‑rose bars, saffron‑cardamom tiramisu.

== Personal life ==
In 2014, Yeh married fellow Juilliard music major Nick Hagen a year after the couple moved to East Grand Forks, Minnesota where Hagen is a fifth-generation farmer.

In 2019, Yeh gave birth to a daughter named after her and husband's family members of past generations. Yeh and her husband's second daughter was born in 2022. Her name was suggested by the director of photography for Girl Meets Farm.

== Bibliography ==
Year	Title	Publisher	ISBN
2016	Molly on the Range: Recipes and Stories from An Unlikely Life on a Farm	Rodale Books	ISBN 162336695X
2018	Yogurt	Short Stack Editions	ISBN 0998697362
2023	Home is Where the Eggs Are	HarperCollins US	ISBN 0063052415
2025	Sweet Farm! More Than 100 Cookies, Cakes, Salads (!), and Other Delights from My Kitchen on a Sugar Beet Farm	HarperCollins US	ISBN 0063052458
