= Lorraine Pascale =

British model and cook

- Born: 17 November 1972 (age 53); Hackney, London, England
- Occupations: TV chef; TV host; model
- Height: 1.80 m (5 ft 11 in)
- Spouses: Kaz Balinski-Jundzill (divorced) Dennis O'Brien (m. 2021)
- Children: Ella Balinska
- Culinary career
- Television shows
- Baking Made Easy; Bakers vs. Fakers; Donut Showdown; Halloween Baking Championship; Holiday Baking Championship; Home Cooking Made Easy; How to Be a Better Cook; Lorraine's Fast, Fresh & Easy Food; Lorraine's Last Minute Christmas; My Kitchen Rules; Spring Baking Championship; Sugar Showdown; Worst Bakers in America
- Website: lorrainepascale.com

Lorraine Pascale (born 17 November 1972) is a British TV chef and USA Food Network host and former model, best known for selling almost one million books in the UK alone. Her TV shows are in 70 countries worldwide. She had her own cooking show on the BBC for several seasons. From 2007 to 2012 she owned a retail outlet in London selling baked goods called Ella's Bakehouse named after her daughter. She is the United Kingdom Government Fostering and Adoption Ambassador and an emotional wellness advocate. She is the mother of Charlie’s Angels star Ella Balinska.

== Early life ==
Pascale was born to Jamaican parents in Hackney at The Mothers' Hospital and was fostered in Leytonstone immediately after she was born. She was adopted at 18 months old and brought up in Witney, Oxfordshire, by a white couple, Roger and Audrey Woodward, who already had a son, Jason. Her adoptive father was a multilingual Spanish academic who had taught at Oxford, and her mother was a nurse. When her parents divorced when she was three years old, Pascale remained with her mother, who subsequently became ill and could no longer care for her. At this point, at age seven, she was fostered to more than one family, with differing degrees of 'fit'. After a year she returned to her mother and met up again with her father, who had remarried and had a daughter. She won a full scholarship given by the Buttle Trust and was educated at a boarding school in Devon.

Pascale has an elder brother and a younger half-sister. She knows her biological parents' identity and their four other children, but she does not wish to re-establish contact: "I know my birth parents' names. I know I've got three brothers and one sister, I know that some of them are in London but I don't have any desire or need to find them. One family is enough."

== Career ==
At age 16, Pascale was spotted as potential model by the agent who had found Naomi Campbell. During her career as a model, she walked with supermodels like Naomi Campbell, Karen Mulder and Kate Moss for Chanel, Versace and many fashion designers. Based in New York, she achieved recognition as the first black British model to appear on the cover of American Elle. She appeared in the 1998 Sports Illustrated swimsuit issue, and as one of the Bond Girls in Robbie Williams' "Millennium" video.

Pascale recognised the need to ensure her future after modelling and embarked on a series of career "try-outs", including hypnotherapy and car mechanics. She took a diploma cookery course at Leith's School of Food and Wine in 2005 and found that cookery fitted her "like a pair of old jeans". After gaining her diploma, she did a series of 'stages' in some London restaurants but, realising that restaurant hours would not suit her, Pascale established herself as a specialist cakemaker, with a contract with Selfridges. Her introduction to Selfridges was at the suggestion of chef Marco Pierre White and in 2008 and 2010 she supplied the London store with over 1000 Christmas cakes. Pascale has opened her own cupcake shop in Covent Garden.

In 2015, Pascale said she practises Transcendental Meditation to relax after work.

=== Television and publishing work ===
In January 2011, Pascale presented a television bakery programme, Baking Made Easy, on BBC television and published a bakery book based upon this series. Later that year, a second series, Home Cooking Made Easy, was broadcast in September and October, with an accompanying book. A Last Minute Christmas programme aired on BBC Two on 22 December 2011. A third book was published in 2012 and a series based upon it, called Fast, Fresh & Easy Food, aired in August and September 2012 on BBC Two.

In early 2014, Pascale co-presented and judged the UK version of My Kitchen Rules with Jason Atherton on Sky Living. In April of that year, it was announced that Pascale was to host a new six-part television series called Lorraine Pascale: How to be a Better Cook that would air later in the year on BBC Two. In March 2015, she co-hosted an episode of The Nation's Favourite Food alongside the Hairy Bikers on BBC Two.

Pascale was a judge on Food Network's Holiday Baking Championship and Spring Baking Championship from 2014 to 2020, as well as a mentor on Worst Bakers in America. She was a judge on two episodes of the first season of Bakers vs. Fakers, and became the host for Season 2 before the show's abrupt cancellation in 2017.

== Charity ==
Pascale is the patron of TACT, the UK's largest fostering and adoption charity, and an ambassador of both the charities Rays of Sunshine and The Prince's Trust. In summer 2008, she was made the ambassador of the National Careers Service launching the service with Skills Minister John Hayes. Pascale visits schools and Women's Maximum security prisons across the country talking about confidence and emotional resilience.

== Personal life ==
In her early twenties Pascale married Polish musician Kaz Balinski-Jundzill, and gave birth to her daughter, actress Ella Balinska, "a year or two later". The couple have since separated and subsequently divorced. On 26 June 2021, she wed businessman Dennis O’Brien at Chelsea Old Town Hall in London.

== Bibliography ==
Pascale has published a number of books, including:

- Baking Made Easy, HarperCollins, 2011 ISBN 978-0007275946
- Home Cooking Made Easy, HarperCollins, 2011 ISBN 978-0007275922
- Lorraine Pascale's Fast, Fresh and Easy Food, HarperCollins, 2012 ISBN 978-0007489664
- A Lighter Way To Bake, HarperCollins, 2013 ISBN 978-0007538331
- How to Be a Better Cook, HarperCollins, 2014 ISBN 978-0007489688
- Eating Well Made Easy, HarperCollins 2015 ISBN 978-0007489701
- Bake, Bluebird 2017 ISBN 978-1509820733
- The Girlies' Guide to Football, Knaur ISBN 978-3426623770

== Filmography ==
Year	Title	Episodes
2011	Home Cooking Made Easy	1. "Comfort" (26 September 2011); 2. "Favourites" (3 October 2011); 3. "Entertaining" (10 October 2011); 4. "Simple" (17 October 2011)
2011	Baking Made Easy	1. "So Easy" (10 January 2011); 2. "Speed Baking" (17 January 2011); 3. "Modern Classics" (24 January 2011); 4. "Very Entertaining" (31 January 2011); 5. "Bake to Impress" (7 February 2011); 6. "Time to Bake" (14 February 2011)
2011	Lorraine's Last Minute Christmas	1. TX 22 December 2011
2012	Lorraine's Fast, Fresh & Easy Food	1. "Easy Entertaining" (13 August 2012); 2. "Feel Good Food" (20 August 2012); 3. "Simple Classics" (27 August 2012); 4. "Baking It" (3 September 2012); 5. "Posh Nosh" (10 September 2012); 6. "Easy Everyday" (17 September 2012)
2014	My Kitchen Rules	
2014	Fostering & Me with Lorraine Pascale	1. TX 19 June 2014
2014	Lorraine Pascale: How to be a Better Cook	1. "Tony Sartori" (12 September 2014); 2. "Bryony Crutcher" (19 September 2014); 3. "Sonia Harwood" (26 September 2014); 4. "Neil Forster" (3 October 2014); 5. "Travis Francis" (10 October 2014); 6. "Sally Mack" (17 October 2014)
2015	The Hairy Bikers and Lorraine Pascale: Cooking the Nation's Favourite Food	1. TX 17 March 2015
2022	RuPaul's Drag Race UK	Series 4; Guest judge
