= Outline of food preparation =

Overview of and topical guide to food preparation

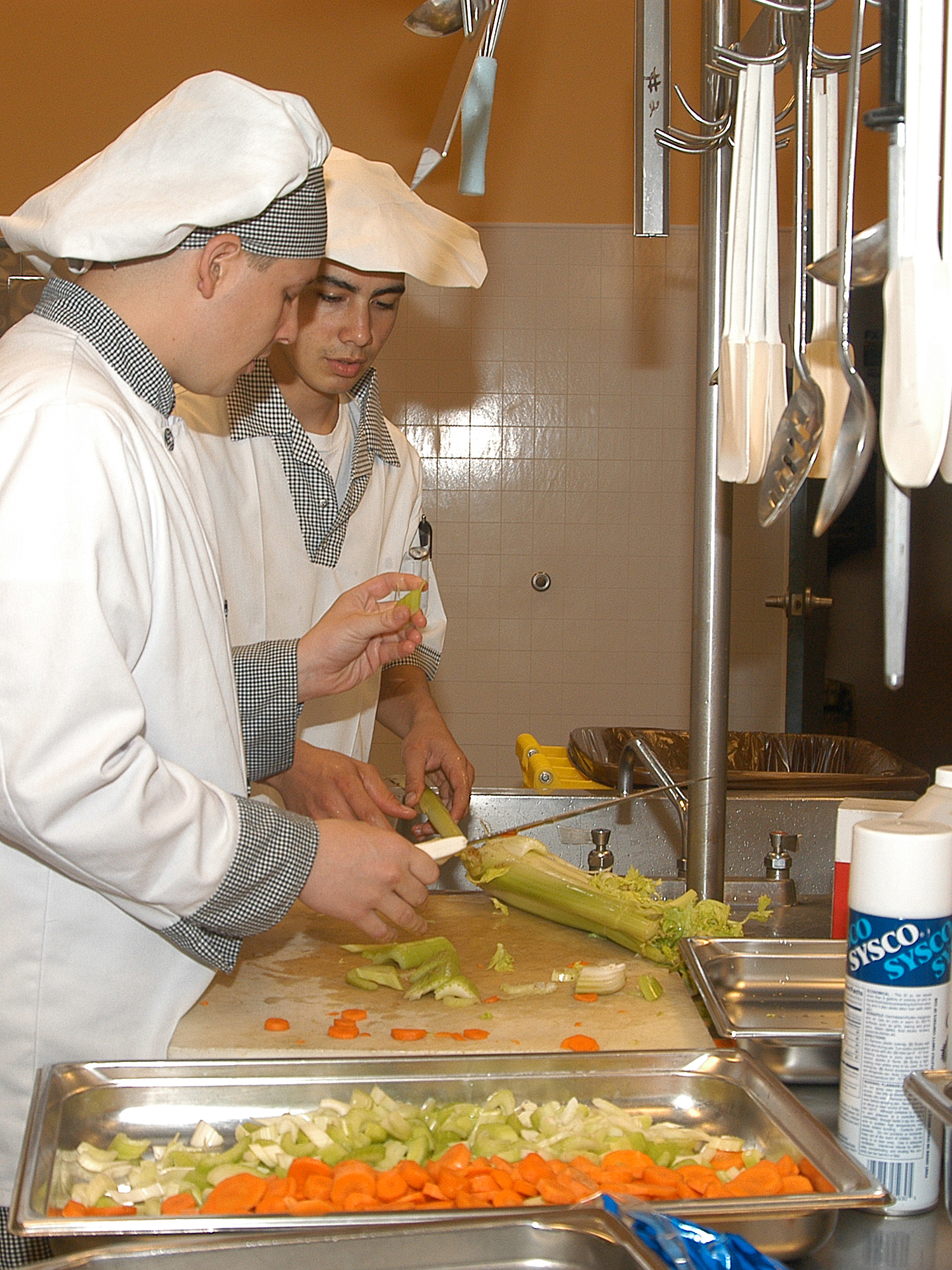
Food preparation at the Naval Air Station, Whidbey Island, Washington state

The following outline is provided as an overview of and topical guide to the preparation of food:

Food preparation is an art form and applied science that includes techniques like cooking to make ingredients fit for consumption and/or palatable.

== Essence of food preparation ==
The process of food preparation includes selecting the ingredients needed and correctly handling ingredients to produce the components of a meal.

- Art – an art, one of the arts, is a creative endeavor or discipline.
  - Culinary art – art of preparing and cooking foods.
- Skill – learned capacity to carry out pre-determined results often with the minimum outlay of time, energy, or both.
- Meal preparation – the process of planning meals.

== General food preparation concepts ==
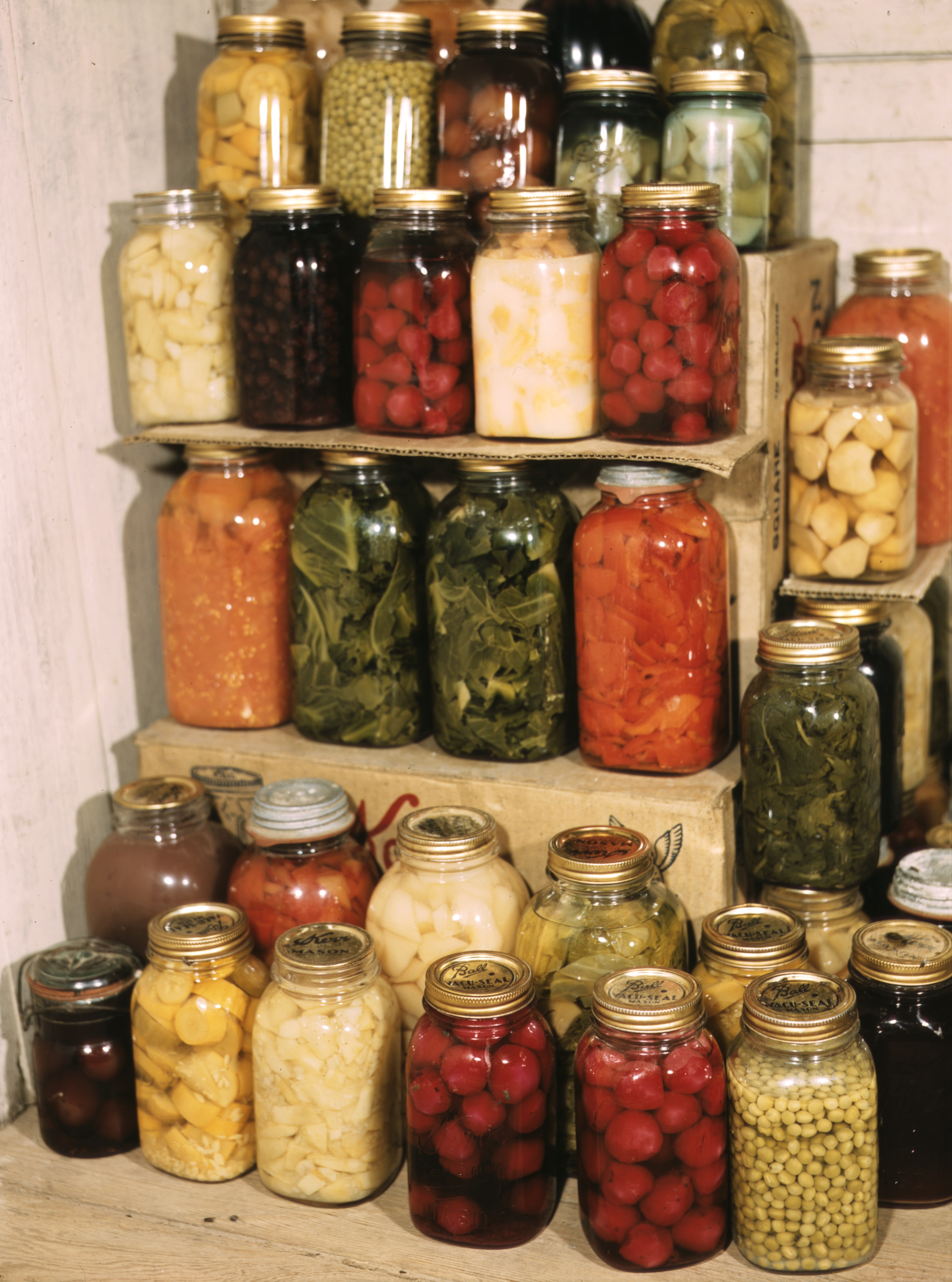
Preserved food

- Chef – a person who cooks professionally for other people. Although over time the term has come to describe any person who cooks for a living, traditionally it refers to a highly skilled professional who is proficient in all aspects of food preparation.
- Cookbook
- Cooking – act of preparing food for eating. It encompasses a vast range of methods, tools and combinations of ingredients to improve the flavour or digestibility of food. It generally requires the selection, measurement and combining of ingredients in an ordered procedure in an effort to achieve the desired result.
- Cooking oil
- Cooking weights and measures – includes conversions and equivalences common in cooking.
- Cuisine – specific set of cooking traditions and practices, often associated with a specific culture. It is often named after the region or place where its underlying culture is present. A cuisine is primarily influenced by the ingredients that are available locally or through trade.
- Eating
- Flavor
- Food is anything solid or liquid which when swallowed, digested and assimilated in the body provides it with essential substances called nutrients and keeps it well. It is the basic necessity of life. Food supplies energy, enables growth and repair of tissues and organs.
- Food and cooking hygiene
- Foodborne illness
- Food preservation
- Ingredients
- International food terms – useful when reading about food and recipes from different countries.
- Recipe
- Restaurant
- Staple food – a food that is "eaten regularly and in such quantities as to constitute the dominant part of the diet and supply a major proportion of energy and nutrient needs".

== Cooking techniques ==
=== Cooking with dry heat ===
KitchenAid Stand Mixer in action

- Baking – the technique of prolonged cooking of food by dry heat acting by convection, normally in an oven, but can also be done in hot ashes or on hot stones. Appliances like bread machines also allow automatic baking.

Baking bread at the Roscheider Hof Open Air Museum

- Blind-baking – baking pastry before adding a filling.

- Barbecuing – method of cooking meat, poultry and occasionally fish with the heat and hot smoke of a fire, smoking wood, or hot coals of charcoal.

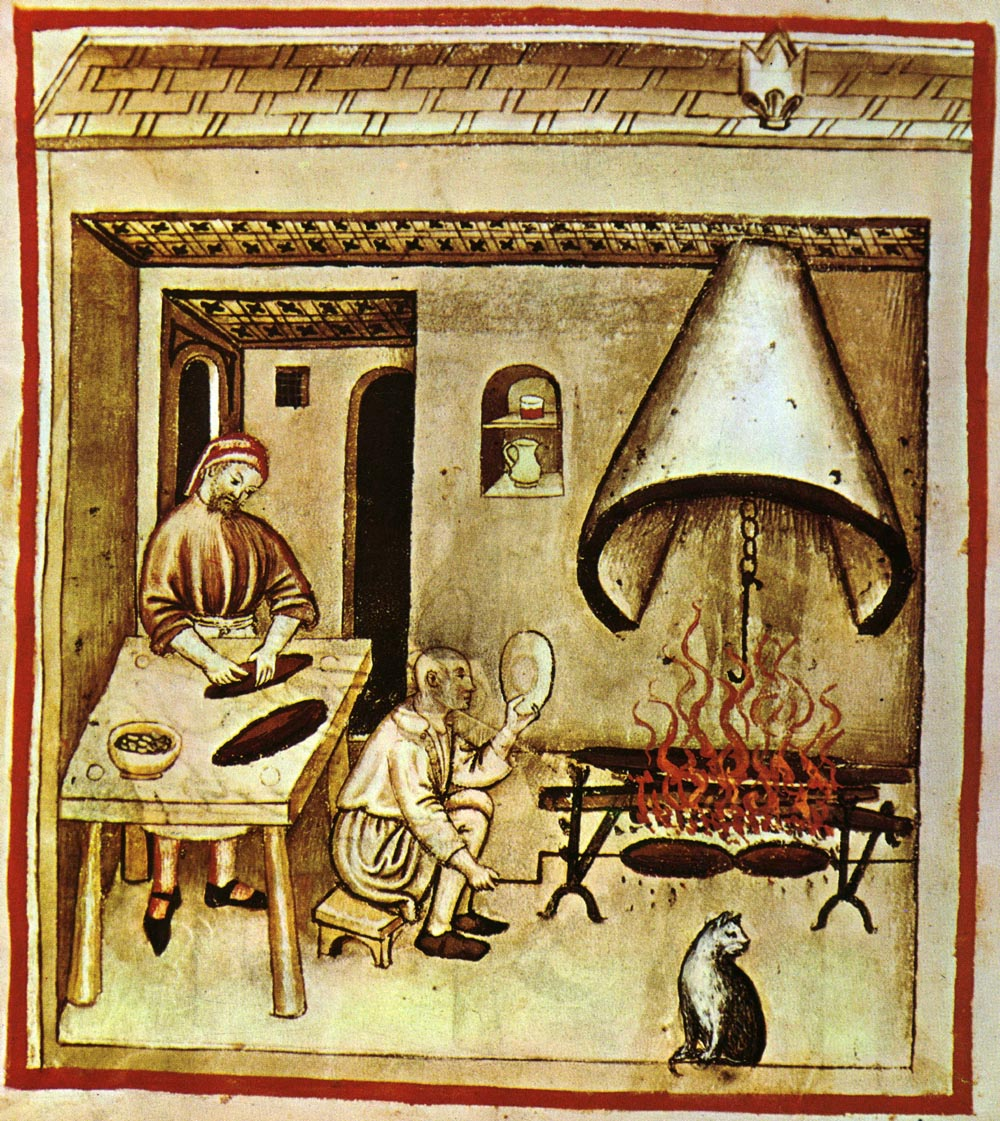
Roasting, medieval illuminated manuscript (Tacuina sanitatis casanatensis 14th century)

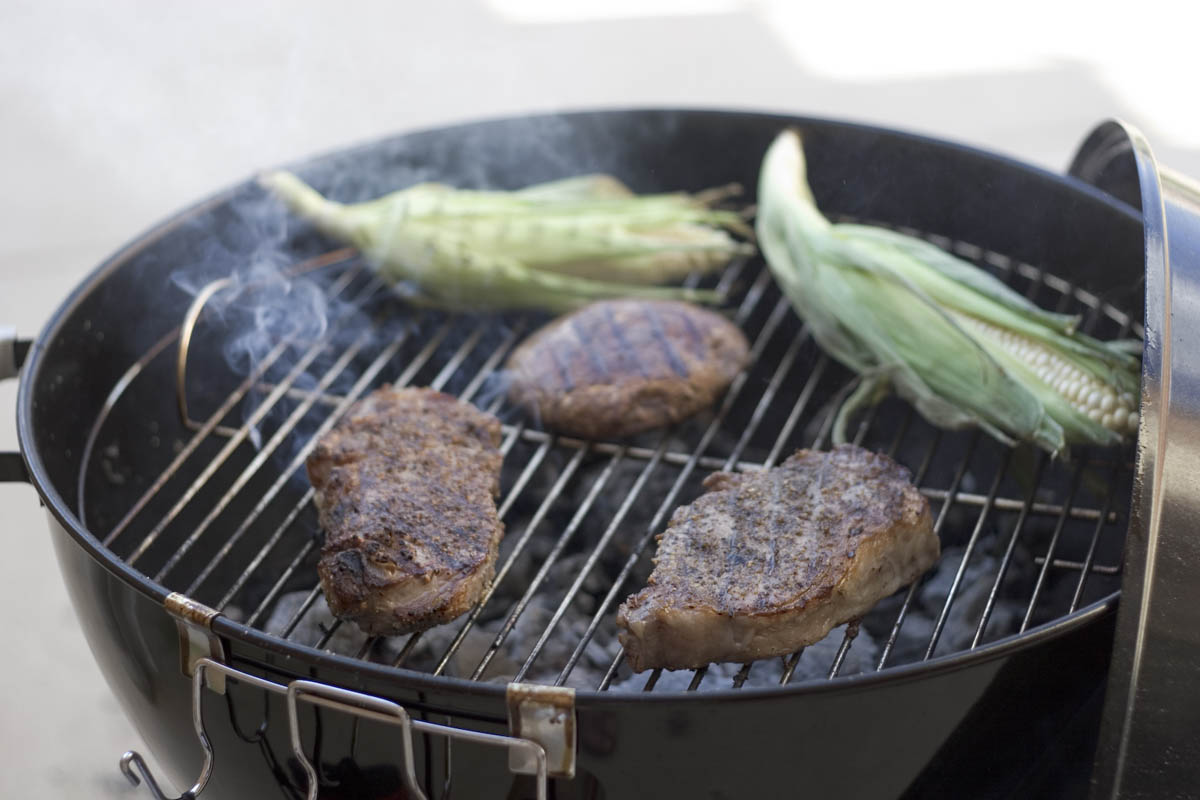
Cooking with charcoal on a barbecue grill

- Grilling – a form of cooking that involves dry heat applied to the surface of food, commonly from above or below. May involve a grill, a grill pan, or griddle.
- Maillard reaction – a chemical reaction that occurs when amino acids and reducing sugars are exposed to heat which gives browned food its distinctive flavor
- Roasting – cooking method that uses dry heat, whether an open flame, oven, or other heat source. Roasting usually causes caramelization or Maillard browning of the surface of the food, which is considered by some as a flavor enhancement.
- Rotisserie – meat is skewered on a spit - a long solid rod used to hold food while it is being cooked over a fire in a fireplace or over a campfire, or while being roasted in an oven.
- Smoking – the process of flavoring, cooking, or preserving food by exposing it to the smoke from burning or smoldering plant materials, most often wood. Hot smoking will cook and flavor the food, while cold smoking only flavors the food.
- Searing – technique used in grilling, baking, braising, roasting, sautéing, etc., in which the surface of the food (usually meat, poultry or fish) is cooked at high temperature so a caramelized crust forms.

=== Cooking with wet heat ===
==== Water and other liquids ====
- Basting – the continued application of a liquid marinade or sauce during dry-heat cooking, usually when roasting meat.
- Boiling – the rapid vaporization of a liquid, which occurs when a liquid is heated to its boiling point, the temperature at which the vapor pressure of the liquid is equal to the pressure exerted on the liquid by the surrounding environmental pressure.
- Blanching – cooking technique which food substance, usually a vegetable or fruit, is plunged into boiling water, removed after a brief, timed interval, and finally plunged into iced water or placed under cold running water (shocked) to halt the cooking process.
- Braising – combination cooking method using both moist and dry heat; typically the food is first seared at a high temperature and then finished in a covered pot with a variable amount of liquid, resulting in a particular flavour.
- Coddling – food is heated in water kept just below the boiling point.
- Infusion – the process of soaking plant matter, such as fruits or tea leaves, in a liquid, such as water or alcohol, so as to impart flavor into the liquid.
- Poaching – process of gently simmering food in liquid, generally milk, stock, or wine.
- Pressure cooking – cooking in a sealed vessel that does not permit air or liquids to escape below a preset pressure, which allows the liquid in the pot to rise to a higher temperature before boiling.
- Simmering – foods are cooked in hot liquids kept at or just below the boiling point of water, but higher than poaching temperature.
- Steaming – boiling water continuously so it vaporizes into steam and carries heat to the food being steamed, thus cooking the food.
  - Double steaming – Chinese cooking technique in which food is covered with water and put in a covered ceramic jar and the jar is then steamed for several hours.
- Steeping – saturation of a food (such as an herb) in a liquid solvent to extract a soluble ingredient into the solvent. E.g., a cup of tea is made by steeping tea leaves in a cup of hot water.
- Stewing – food is cooked in liquid and served in the resultant gravy.
- Vacuum flask cooking

==== Frying with oil ====
- Frying – cooking food in oil or another fat, a technique that originated in ancient Egypt around 2500 BC.
- Deep frying – food is submerged in hot oil or fat. This is normally performed with a deep fryer or chip pan.
- Hot salt frying
- Pan frying – cooking food in a pan using a small amount of cooking oil or fat as a heat transfer agent and to keep the food from sticking.
- Pressure frying
- Sautéing
- Shallow frying
- Stir frying

== Other food preparation techniques ==
=== Chemical techniques ===
- Brining – a process similar to marination in which meat or poultry is soaked in brine before cooking
- Ceviche
- Drying
- Fermentation
- Marinating

- Saikyoyaki

- Pickling
- Salting
- Seasoning
- Souring
- Sprouting
- Sugaring

=== Mechanical techniques ===
- Cutting
  - Cutting board
  - Dicing – cutting an ingredient into cubes of a consistent size.
  - Grating – using a grater to shred an ingredient, for instance, vegetables or cheese.
  - Julienning – the process of cutting an ingredient into very thin, long pieces, such as the thin carrots in store bought salad mix.
  - Mincing – cutting an ingredient into very small pieces.
  - Peeling – removing the outer skin/covering off of an ingredient, commonly a fruit or a vegetable.
  - Shaving – the process of planing off thin strips of an ingredient.
  - Chiffonade – cutting an ingredient into ribbons.
- Kneading
- Milling
- Mixing – incorporating several different ingredients to make something new; for instance, mixing water, sugar, and lemon juice makes lemonade.
  - Blending – using a specialized machine called a blender to grind or puree ingredients together.
- Vacuum filling – a mechanized method of creating filled items, for instance, for filling pastries.

== Cooking tools ==
=== Appliances ===
- Microwave oven – type of oven that heats foods quickly and efficiently using microwaves. However, unlike conventional ovens, a microwave oven does not brown bread or bake food. This makes microwave ovens unsuitable for cooking certain foods and unable to achieve certain culinary effects. Additional kinds of heat sources can be added into microwave ovens or microwave packaging so as to add these additional effects.
- Oven
- Stove or cooker

== History of food preparation ==
- History of Indian cuisine

== International cuisine ==
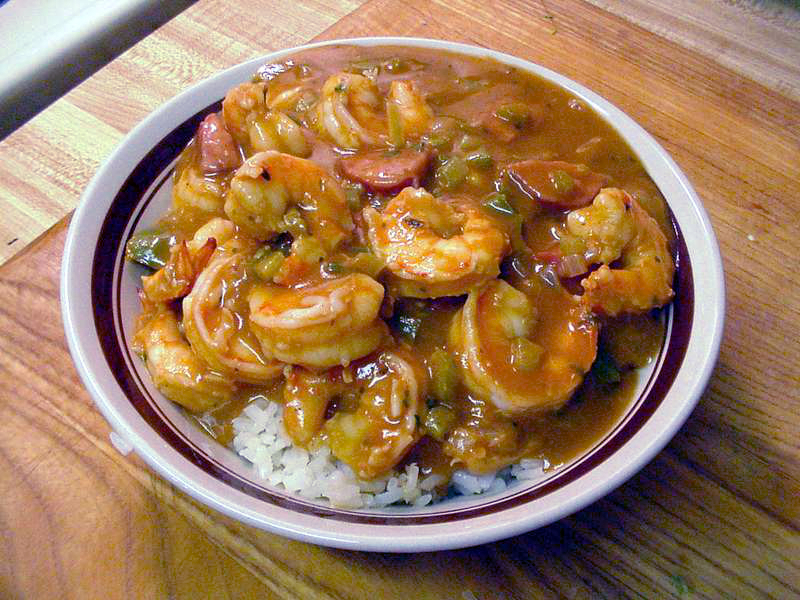
Seafood gumbo, an example of Cajun cuisine

A sample of some cuisines around the world:

- African cuisine (see list)
  - Mediterranean cuisine
  - Ethiopian cuisine
- Asian cuisine (see list)
  - Korean cuisine
  - Chinese cuisine
  - Japanese cuisine
  - Indian cuisine
  - Thai cuisine
  - Vietnamese cuisine
- European cuisine (see list)
  - Mediterranean cuisine
  - Eastern European cuisine
    - Russian cuisine
  - German cuisine
  - English cuisine
  - French cuisine
  - Italian cuisine
- Oceanian cuisine (see list)
  - Australian cuisine
  - New Zealand cuisine
- Cuisine of the Americas (see list)
  - Canadian cuisine
  - American cuisine
    - Cajun cuisine
  - Latin American cuisine
    - Mexican cuisine
    - South American cuisine
      - Argentine cuisine
      - Peruvian cuisine

== General ingredients ==
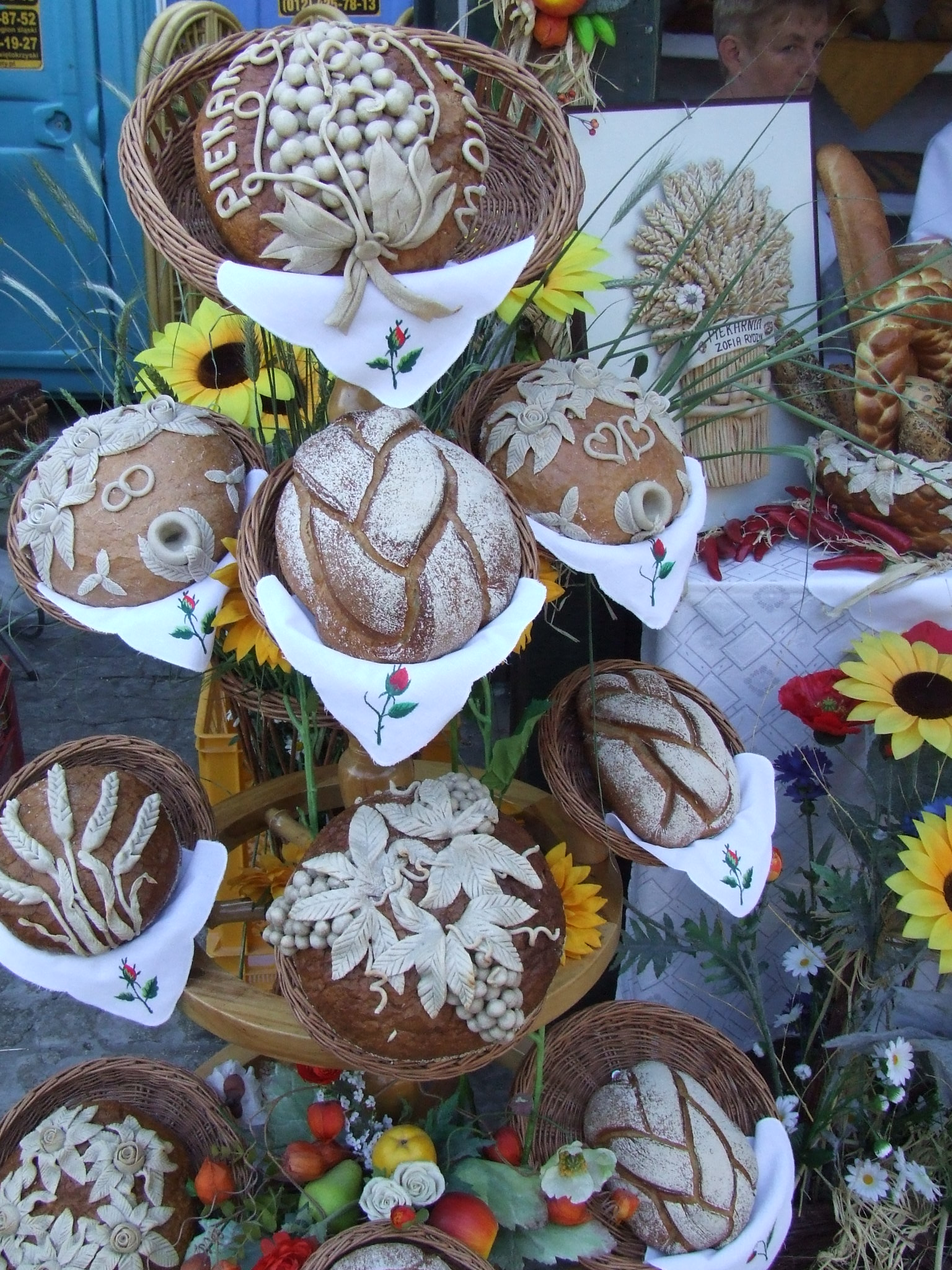
Decorated bread loaves

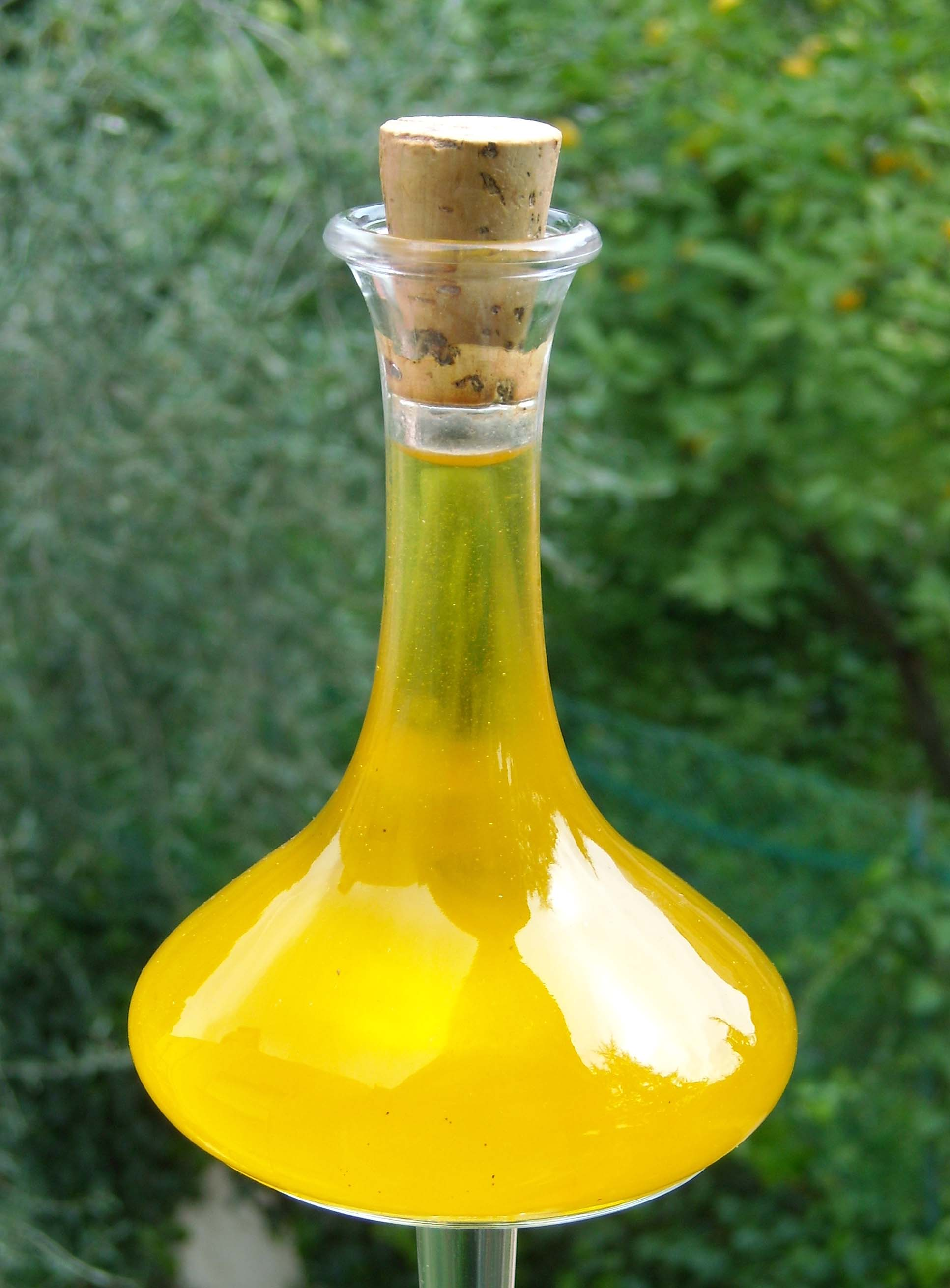
Olive oil

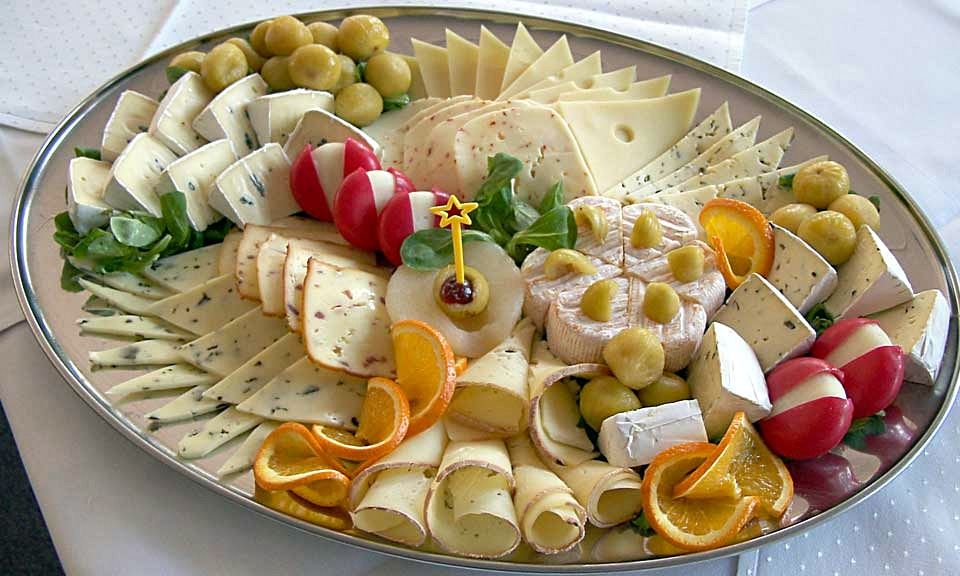
A platter with cheese and garnishes

- Cereals –
  - Maize –
  - Oats –
  - Rice –
  - Wheat –
    - Bread –
    - Noodles –
- Cooking fats and oils
  - Butter –
  - Rapeseed (Canola) oil –
  - Coconut oil –
  - Corn oil –
  - Rice bran oil –
  - Flaxseed oil –
  - Lard –
  - Margarine –
  - Olive oil –
  - Palm oil –
  - Peanut oil –
  - Sesame oil –
  - Soybean oil –
  - Sunflower oil –
  - Tallow –
- Dairy –
  - Buttermilk –
  - Cheese –
  - Cream –
  - Milk –
  - Yogurt –
- Eggs –
- Fruits –
  - Apples –
  - Cherries –
  - Pears –

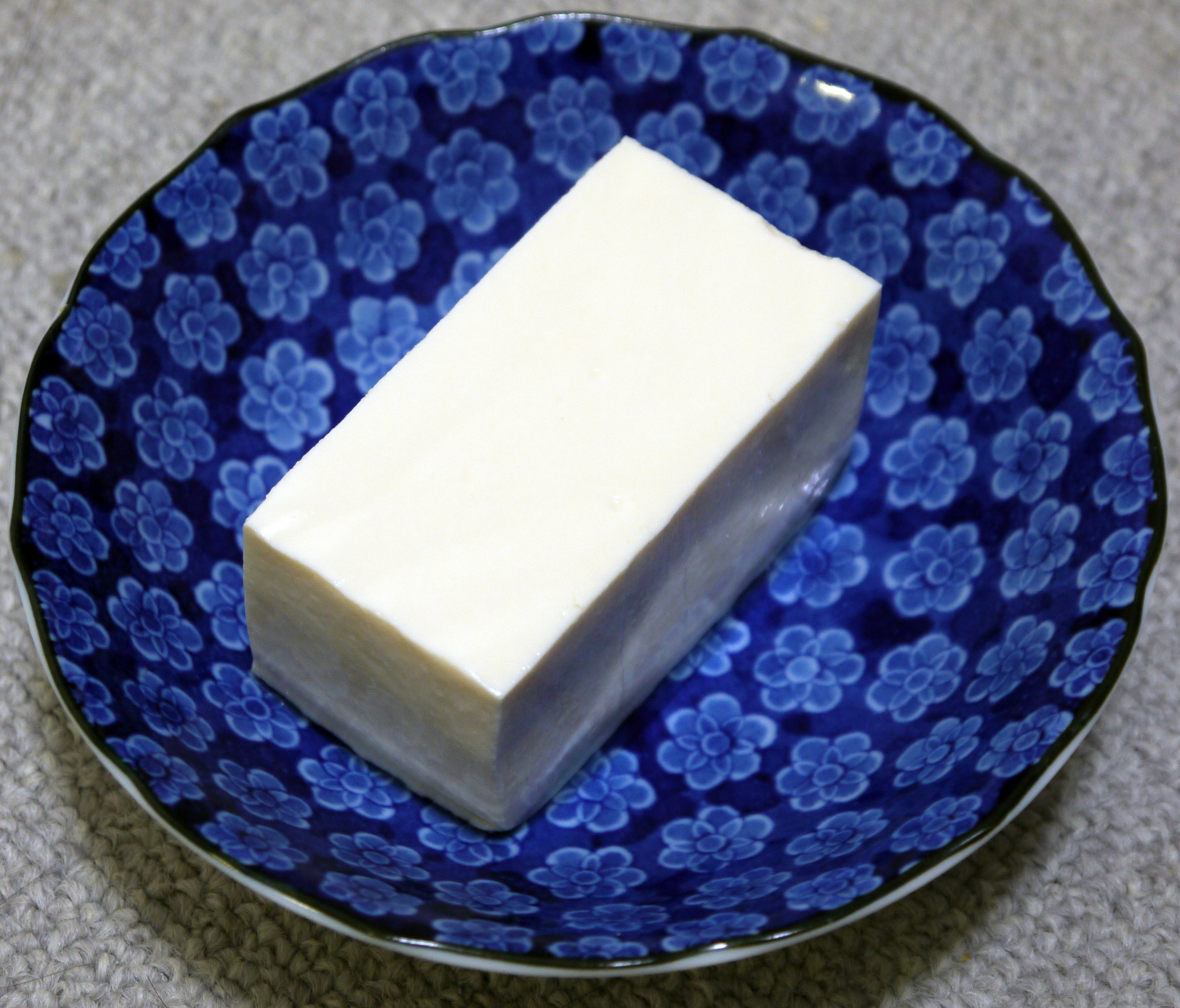
Japanese silken tofu (Kinugoshi Tofu)

- Legumes –
  - Beans –
  - Lentils –
  - Soy –
    - Miso –
    - Soy cheese –
    - Soy milk –
    - Soy sauce –
    - Soy yogurt –
    - Textured soy protein –
    - Tofu –

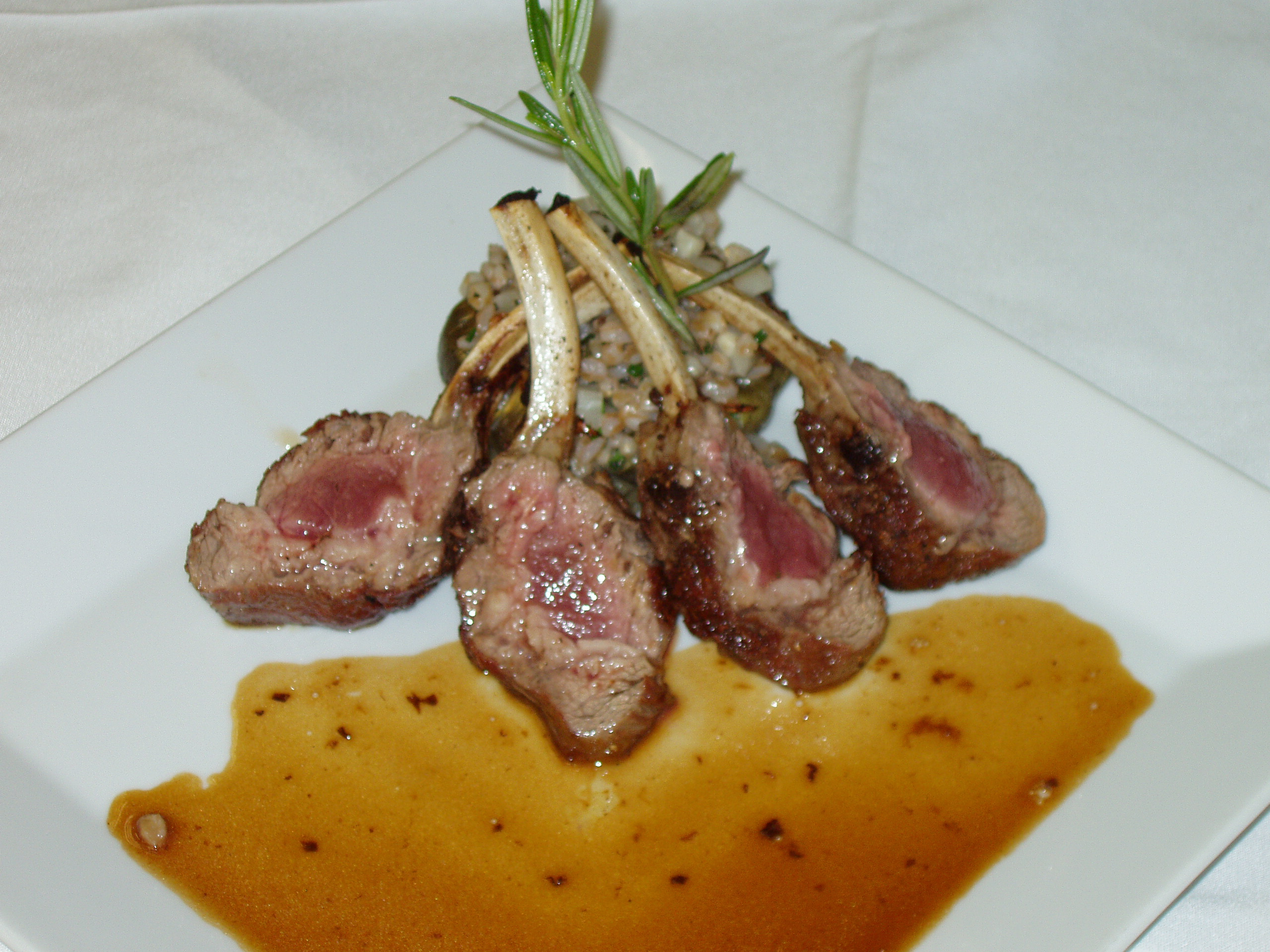
Lamb cutlets

- Meat –
  - Beef –
  - Fish –
  - Mutton –
  - Poultry –
  - Pork –
- Mushrooms –
  - Champignon –

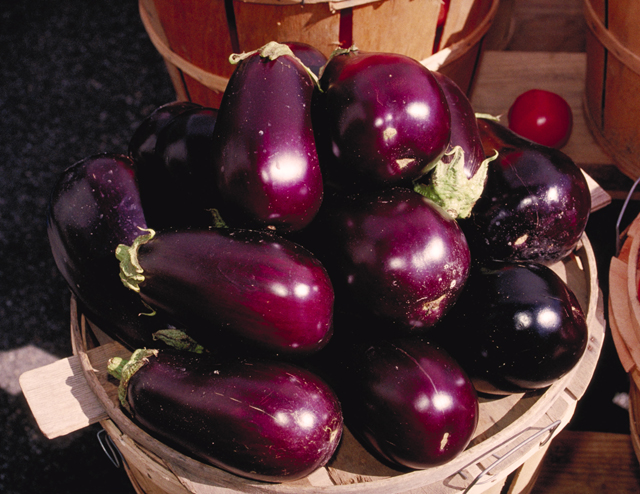
Eggplants, also called aubergines

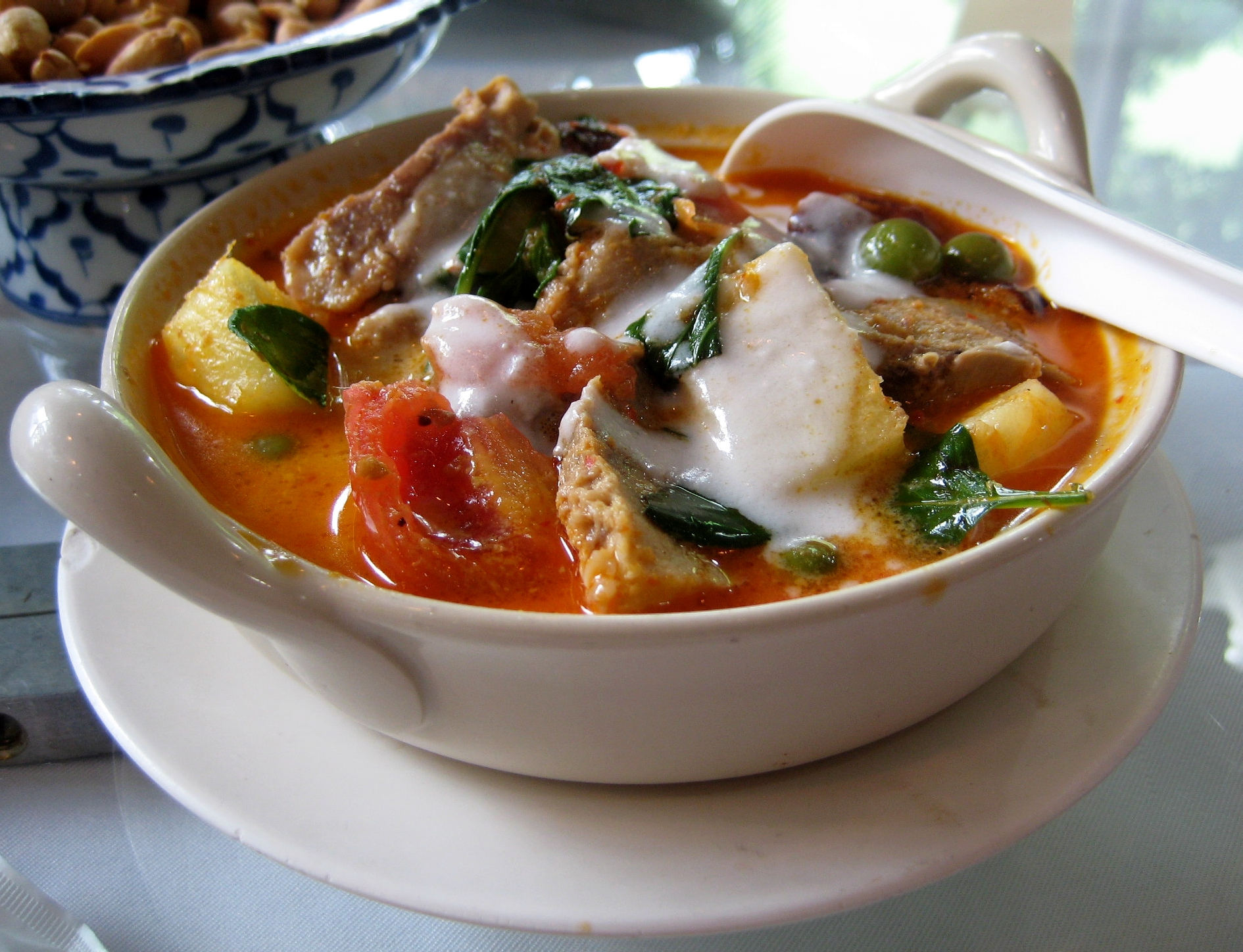
Thai Kaeng phet pet yang: roast duck in red curry

- Seasonings
  - Herbs –
  - Parsley –
  - Spices –
    - Pepper –
    - Salt –
- Sweeteners –
  - Agave nectar –
  - Fructose –
  - Glucose –
  - Honey –
  - Stevia –
  - Sugar –
- Vegetables –
  - Cucumber –
  - Eggplants –
  - Garlic –
  - Onions –
  - Potatoes –
  - Squash –
  - Tomatoes –

== See also ==
- Cookbooks
- Culinary profession
- Food writing
- Junk food
- List of cocktails
- List of food preparation utensils
- List of soups
- List of twice-baked foods
- Natural food
- Nutrition
- Organic food
- Whole food
