= Hot salt frying =

Cooking technique

Hot sand frying and hot salt frying are cooking techniques used by street-side food vendors in Bangladesh, India, Nepal, Pakistan, China and Sri Lanka. Hot salt frying is an old cooking technique, and is used in villages throughout Asia and other parts of the world. Many foods are fried with hot salt or sand, even in common households.

== Hot salt frying ==
Muri, or puffed rice, is also a common snack in the Indian subcontinent and is one of their oldest foods. The puffed rice is made by heating salt or sand in a karahi (in India), a patil (in Bangladesh), or a wok over a fire in a traditional Indian stove, then pouring parboiled or dried pre-cooked rice into it and stirring. The puffed rice is then quickly removed with a metal sieve and set to cool.

In Pakistan, hot salt frying is mostly used by street vendors to cook corn. Rock salt is preheated in a wok. Either the whole corn or individual kernels are buried in the salt and occasionally turned. In India, this technique is used by street vendors selling shelled peanuts, chickpeas, or popcorn cooked in salt heated in an iron wok.

Coarse sea salt is placed in a large wok and heated to a high temperature. Dry food items, such as eggs in shell, are buried in the hot salt and occasionally turned with a spatula.

== Hot sand frying ==
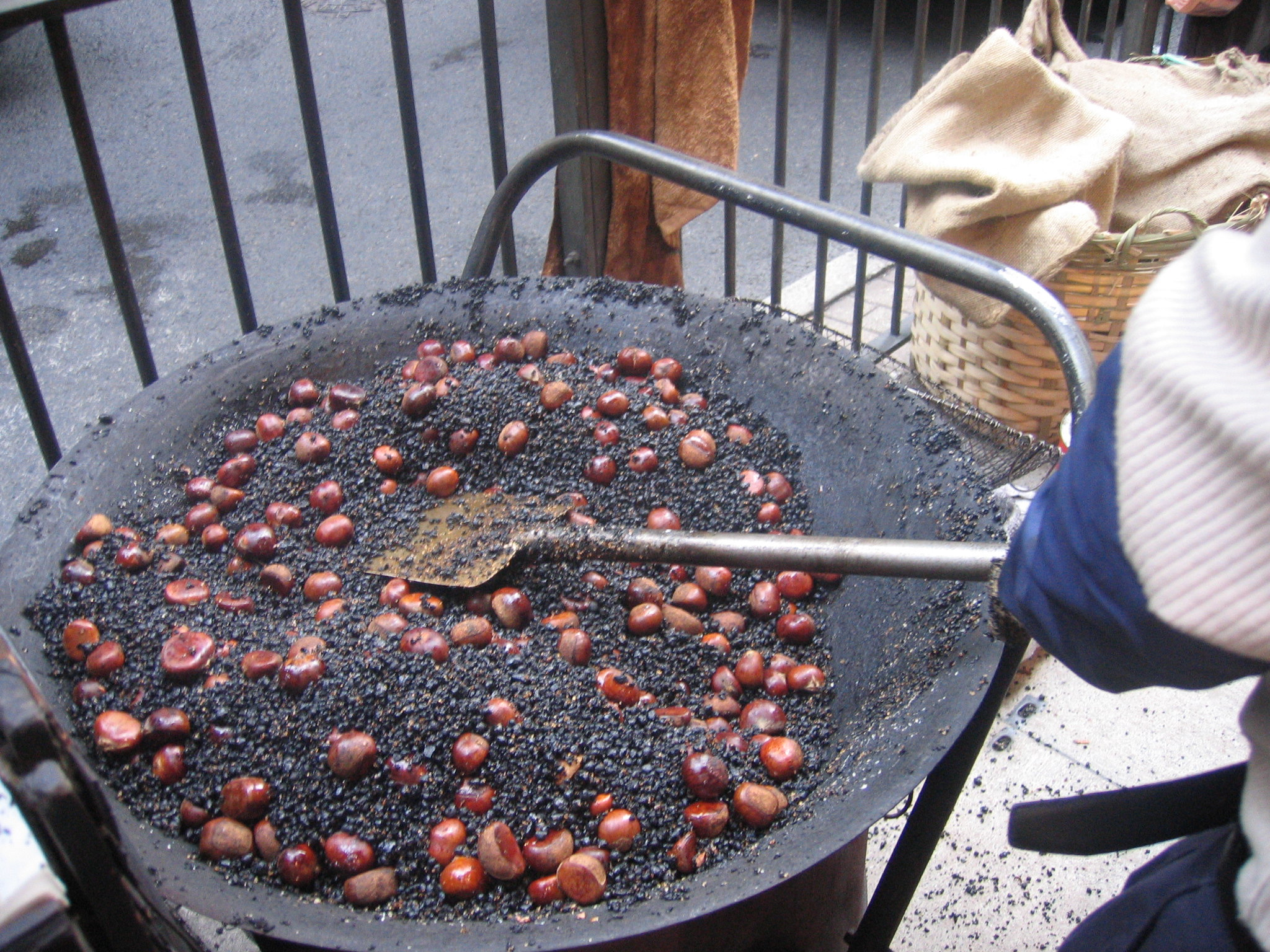
Chestnuts in hot black sand, prepared by a street-side hawker.

Hot sand frying is a common cooking technique for street-side food vendors in China and India to cook chestnuts and peanuts. A large wok is filled with sand, which turns black from accumulating carbonized particles from the food items being fried, and heated to high temperature. Nuts are buried in the hot sand and occasionally turned with a spatula, then the sand and nuts are separated through a wire-mesh screen. Hot sand frying is also used in many villages throughout Asia. A common cooking technique in villages is to wrap fish or other meat in a banana leaf, tie it off, and then place the banana leaf in the heated sand one side at a time.

== See also ==
- Ash cake
- Taguella
- Chinese cuisine
