= Hasma =

Dessert from frog glands, popular in Asia

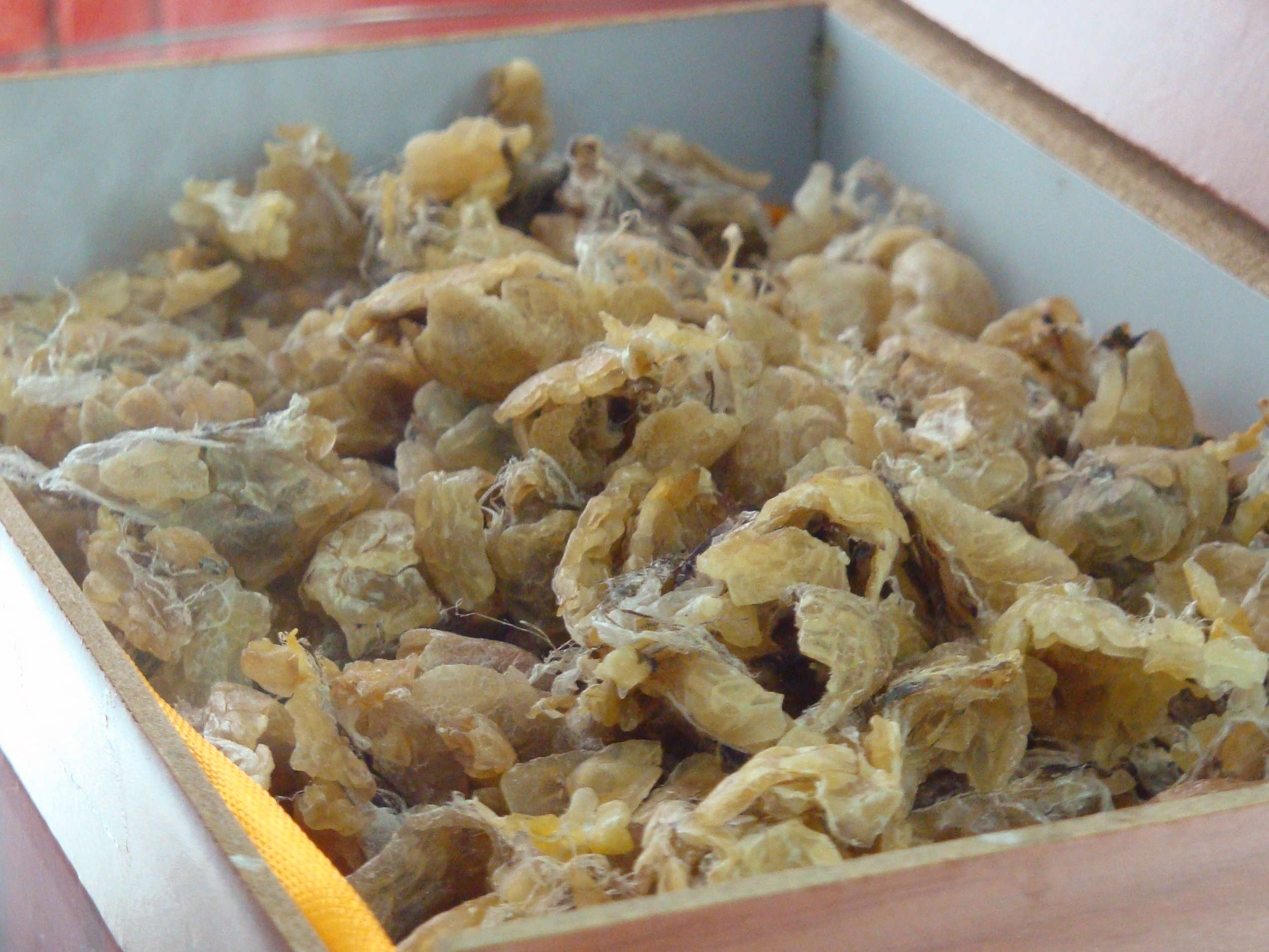
- Dried hasma, sold in a box
- Alternative names: Harsmar, hashima, toad oil
- Place of origin: China
- Region or state: Heilongjiang, Jilin, and Liaoning
- Main ingredients: Fatty tissue found near the fallopian tubes of true frogs

Hasma
- Chinese: 1. 雪蛤; 2. 雪蛤膏
Transcriptions
Standard Mandarin
- Hanyu Pinyin: 1. xuě gé 2. xuě gé gāo
Yue: Cantonese
- Jyutping: 1. syut3 gap3 2. syut3 gap3 gou1

Alternative Chinese name
- Chinese: 哈士蟆
Transcriptions
Standard Mandarin
- Hanyu Pinyin: hā shì ma
Yue: Cantonese
- Jyutping: haa1 si6*2 maa5

Hasma (harsmar, hashima) is a Chinese and widely Central Asian dessert ingredient made from the dried fatty tissue found near the fallopian tubes of true frogs, typically the Asiatic grass frog (Rana chensinensis). Because of its whitish appearance, hasma is often called "snow frog fat". Hasma is relatively expensive, so it is reserved for special occasions and found in high-end restaurants.

== Production ==
Hasma is produced primarily in the Heilongjiang, Jilin, and Liaoning provinces in China. Previously part of Chinese imperial cuisine, soups made with hasma are now widely available in North American cities with large Chinese populations and in Mainland China, Taiwan, Singapore and Hong Kong, albeit at a high price.

== Physical characteristics ==
Hasma is sold dried as irregular flat pieces and flakes ranging from 1–2 cm in length and 1–5 mm in thickness. Individual pieces are yellowish-white in color with a matte luster, and may be covered with off-white pellicles. When rehydrated, dried hasma can expand up to 10-15 times in size.

The dried hasma is rehydrated and double-boiled with rock sugar to create a glutinous texture and opaque color. Dried or rehydrated hasma has a slight fishy smell. In its unflavored form it is sweet and slightly savory in taste with a texture that is glutinous, chewy, and light, quite similar to that of tapioca in a dessert.

== Preparation ==
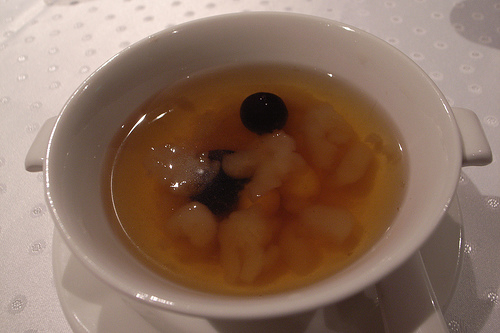
Hasma cooked with jujubes

Hasma serves the role of providing texture to tong sui, or sweet soups, as well as increasing the perceived luxuriousness and prestige of the soup. These soups are usually flavored with rock sugar. For the uninitiated, this relatively accessible eating experience belies the exotic sounding nature of the dessert. Hasma is widely featured in dessert dishes in high class restaurants in Hong Kong.

Hasma is most commonly paired in sweet soups with:

- Jujubes (Chinese: 紅棗; pinyin: hóng zǎo; lit. 'red date')
- Dried longan fruits (Chinese: 龍眼; pinyin: lóng yǎn; lit. 'dragon eye')
- Lotus seeds (Chinese: 蓮子; pinyin: lían zǐ)

It is also a key ingredient in making "Three snow soup" (Chinese: 三雪湯; pinyin: sān xuě tāng), which consists of:

- Chinese pear (Chinese: 雪梨; pinyin: xuě lí; lit. 'snow pear')
- Snow fungus (Chinese: 雪耳; pinyin: xuě ěr; lit. 'snow ear')

Hasma can also be included in more exotic versions of shark fin soup.

== Health claims ==
Hasma is taken for medicinal purposes in traditional Chinese medicine. Hasma is prescribed to treat respiratory symptoms, but there exists scarce scientific research to support this practice. It is also a suggested remedy for stomach ulcers and to improve the appearance of skin, and even for restored strength after childbirth.
