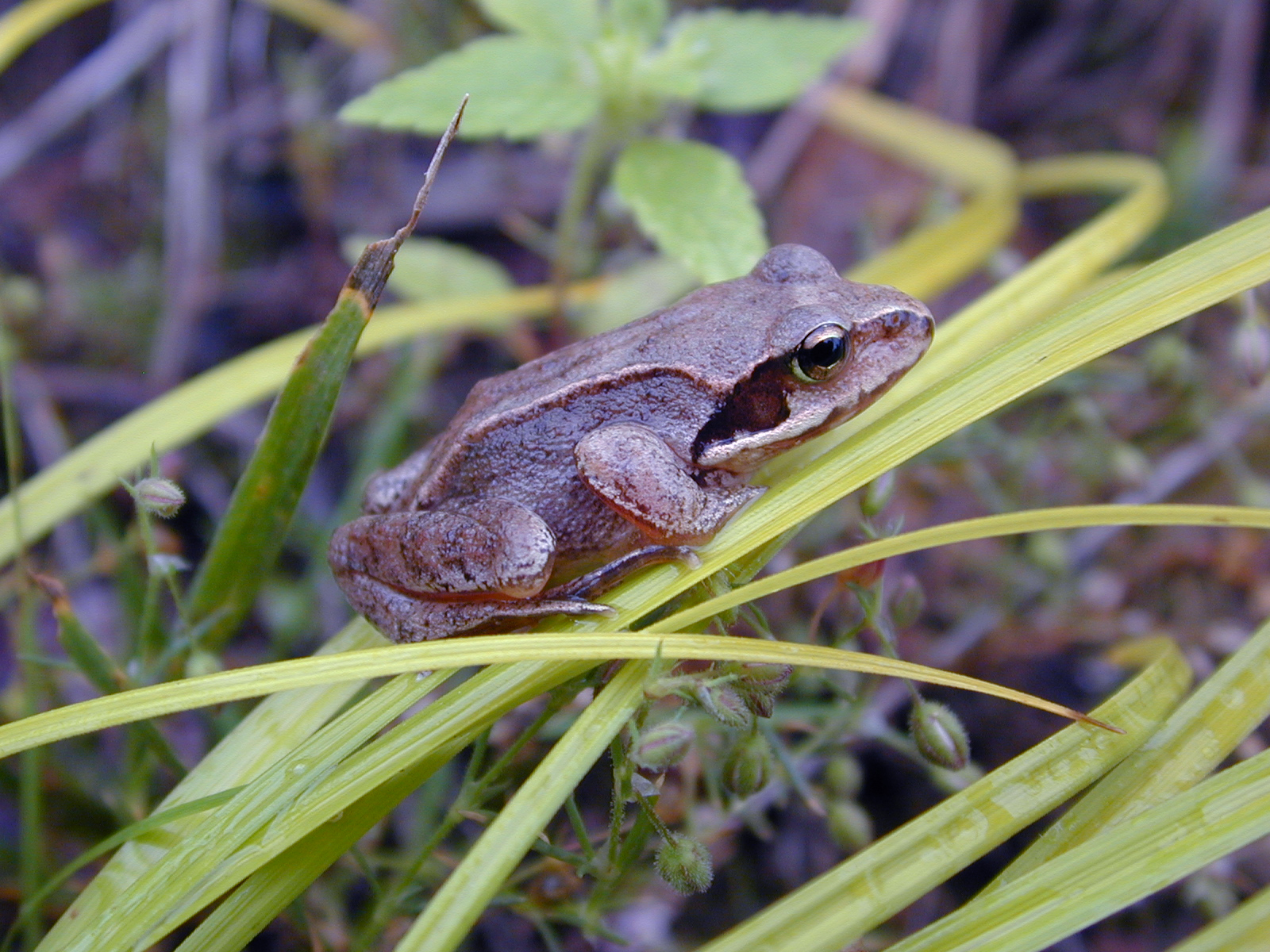

Conservation status
- Least Concern (IUCN 3.1)

Scientific classification
- Kingdom: Animalia
- Phylum: Chordata
- Class: Amphibia
- Order: Anura
- Family: Ranidae
- Genus: Rana
- Species: R. chensinensis

Binomial name
- Rana chensinensis David, 1875

= Rana chensinensis =

Asiatic grass frog

Species of amphibian

The Asiatic grass frog or Chinese brown frog (Rana chensinensis) is a species of frog in the family Ranidae, found in China and Mongolia.

Its natural habitats are temperate forests, intermittent rivers, swamps, freshwater lakes, intermittent freshwater marshes, arable land, pastureland, and irrigated land. It is threatened by habitat loss.

This frog is noted in Chinese agriculture for its strong preying performance on pests. A study conducted in Qingyuan County during the years 1982 and 1983 found that breeding the frogs decreased both the use of pesticides and the pollution in the environment.

Within China, fatty tissue close to the frog's fallopian tubes are used to make Hasma, a dessert ingredient and traditional medicine.
