= High-altitude cooking =

Cooking food on mountainous lands

High-altitude cooking is cooking done at altitudes that are considerably higher than sea level. At elevated altitudes, any cooking that involves boiling or steaming generally requires compensation for lower temperatures because the boiling point of water is lower at higher altitudes due to the decreased atmospheric pressure. The effect starts to become relevant at altitudes above approximately 2,000 feet (610 m). Means of compensation include extending cooking times or using a pressure cooker to provide higher pressure inside the cooking vessel and thus higher temperatures.

== Boiling ==
At sea level, water boils at 100 °C (212 °F). For every 152.4-metre (500 ft) increase in elevation, water's boiling point is lowered by approximately 1°F. At 2,438.4 metres (8,000 ft) in elevation, water boils at just 92 °C (198 °F). Boiling as a cooking method must be adjusted or alternatives applied. Food will take longer to cook, or cannot be prepared at all depending on temperatures required.

== Methods used at high altitudes ==
A pressure cooker is often used to compensate for the low atmospheric pressure at very high elevations. Under these circumstances, water boils at temperatures significantly below 100 °C and, without the use of a pressure cooker, may leave boiled foods undercooked. Charles Darwin commented on this phenomenon in The Voyage of the Beagle:

"Having crossed the Peuquenes (Piuquenes), we descended into a mountainous country, intermediate between the two main ranges, and then took up our quarters for the night. We were now in the republic of Mendoza. The elevation was probably not under 11,000 feet [...]. At the place where we slept water necessarily boiled, from the diminished pressure of the atmosphere, at a lower temperature than it does in a less lofty country; the case being the converse of that of a Papin's digester. Hence the potatoes, after remaining for some hours in the boiling water, were nearly as hard as ever. The pot was left on the fire all night, and next morning it was boiled again, but yet the potatoes were not cooked."

== Boiling point of pure water at elevated altitudes ==
Based on standard sea-level atmospheric pressure (courtesy, NOAA):

Altitude, ft (m)	Boiling point of water, °F (°C)
0 (0 m)	212°F (100°C)
500 (150 m)	211.1°F (99.5°C)
1,000 (305 m)	210.2°F (99°C)
2,000 (610 m)	208.4°F (98°C)
5,000 (1,524 m)	203°F (95°C)
6,000 (1,829 m)	201.1°F (94°C)
8,000 (2,438 m)	197.4°F (91.9°C)
10,000 (3,048 m)	193.6°F (89.8°C)
12,000 (3,658 m)	189.8°F (87.6°C)
14,000 (4,267 m)	185.9°F (85.5°C)
15,000 (4,572 m)	184.1°F (84.5°C)

Source: NASA.
