= Cooking =

Preparing food using heat

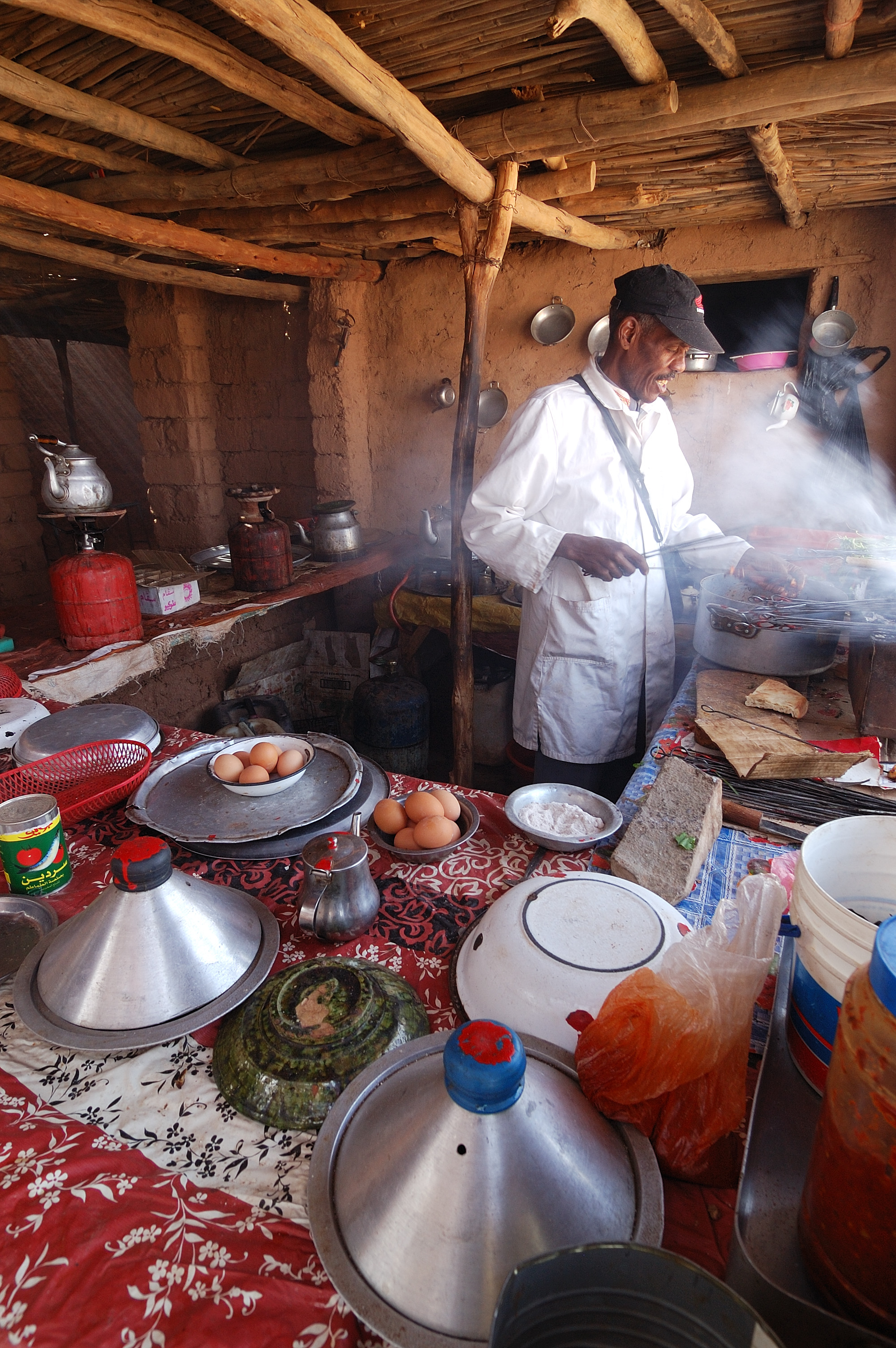
A man cooking in a restaurant kitchen, Morocco

Cooking, also known as cookery, is the art, science and craft of using heat to make food more palatable, digestible, nutritious, or safe. Cooking techniques and ingredients vary widely, from grilling food over an open fire, to using electric stoves, to baking in various types of ovens, to boiling and blanching in water, reflecting local conditions, techniques and traditions. Cooking is an aspect of all human societies and a cultural universal.

Types of cooking also depend on the skill levels and training of the cooks. Cooking is done both by people in their own dwellings and by professional cooks and chefs in restaurants and other food establishments. The term "culinary arts" usually refers to cooking that primarily focuses on the aesthetic presentation and taste of food.

Preparing food with heat or fire is an activity unique to humans. Archaeological evidence of cooking fires dates to at least 300,000 years ago, but some estimate that humans started cooking as early as 2 million years ago.

The expansion of agriculture, commerce, trade, and transportation between civilizations in different regions offered cooks many new ingredients. New inventions and technologies, such as the invention of pottery for holding and boiling of water, expanded cooking techniques. Some modern cooks apply advanced scientific techniques to food preparation to further enhance the flavor of the dish served.

== History ==
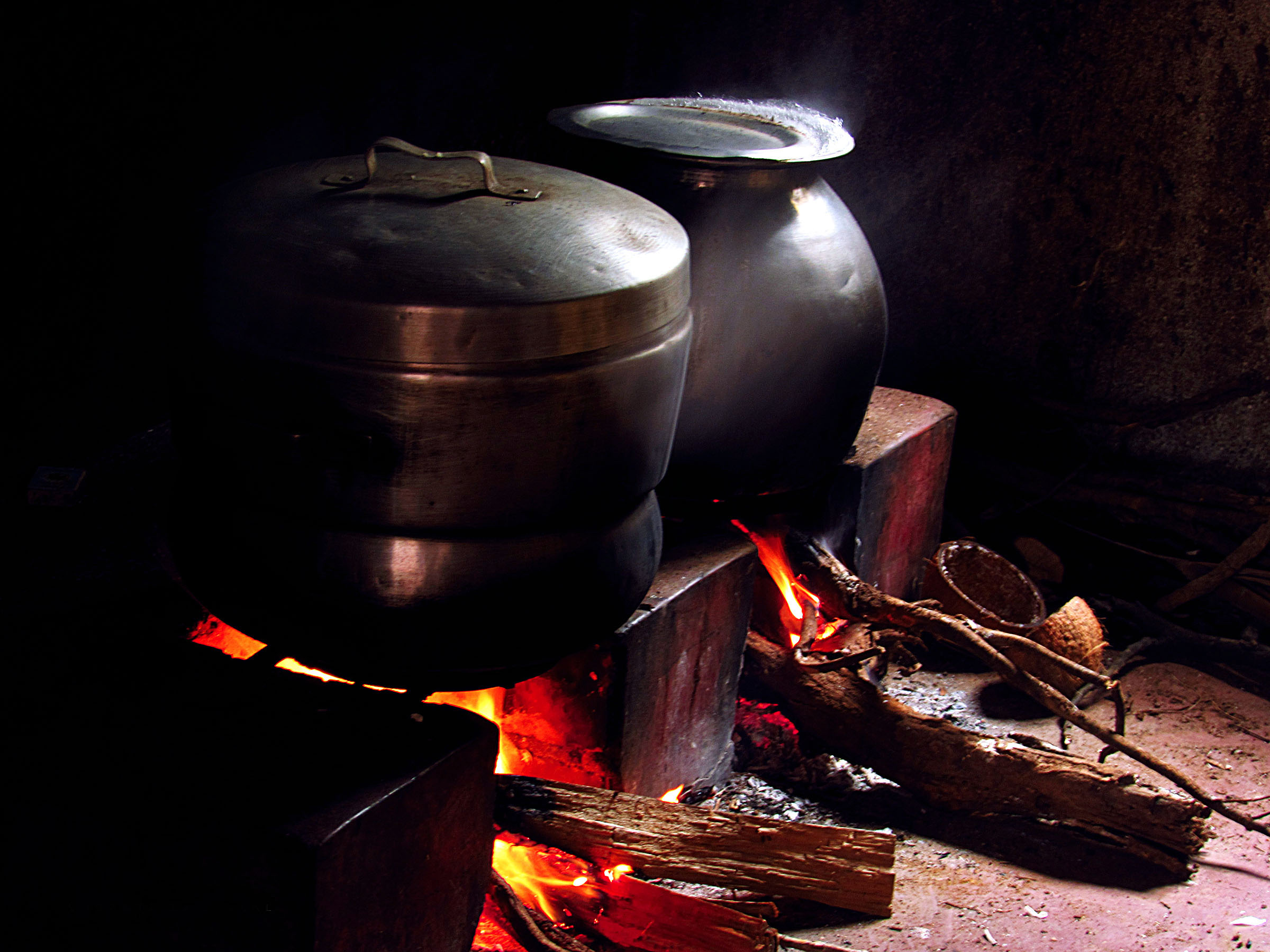
Pots being heated with a wood-burning fire in South India

Phylogenetic analysis suggests that early hominids may have adopted cooking 1–2 million years ago. Re-analysis of burnt bone fragments and plant ashes from the Wonderwerk Cave in South Africa has provided evidence supporting control of fire by early humans 1 million years ago. In his seminal work Catching Fire: How Cooking Made Us Human, Richard Wrangham suggested that evolution of bipedalism and a large cranial capacity meant that early Homo habilis regularly cooked food. However, unequivocal evidence in the archaeological record for the controlled use of fire begins at 400,000 BCE, much later than the period species like Homo erectus are thought to have lived. Archaeological evidence from 300,000 years ago, in the form of ancient hearths, earth ovens, burnt animal bones, and flint, are found across Europe and the Middle East. The oldest evidence (via heated fish teeth from a deep cave) of controlled use of fire to cook food by archaic humans was dated to ~780,000 years ago. Anthropologists think that widespread cooking fires began about 250,000 years ago when hearths first appeared.

Recently, the earliest hearths have been reported to be at least 790,000 years old.

Communication between the Old World and the New World in the Columbian Exchange influenced the history of cooking. The movement of foods across the Atlantic from the New World, such as potatoes, tomatoes, maize, beans, bell pepper, chili pepper, vanilla, pumpkin, cassava, avocado, peanut, pecan, cashew, pineapple, blueberry, sunflower, chocolate, gourds, green beans, and squash, had a profound effect on Old World cooking. The movement of foods across the Atlantic from the Old World, such as cattle, sheep, pigs, wheat, oats, barley, rice, apples, pears, peas, chickpeas, mustard, and carrots, similarly changed New World cooking.

In the 17th and 18th centuries, food was a classic marker of identity in Europe. In the 19th-century "Age of Nationalism", cuisine became a defining symbol of national identity.

Ilaria Porciani notes that the consequences of industrial food manufacturing, such as McDonald's and other fast-food places, created a desire for authentic cuisine. She argues that food becomes entangled with nostalgia and is imagined in terms of authenticity and tradition, thereby representing continuity with past generations. In this way, food undergoes heritagization. In the 19th and 20th centuries, food became part of a larger process of defining national identity, which can be seen as an informal 'contract' between those who assign heritage status and the people. National intellectuals and folklorists shaped this process by researching national traditions and fostering a sense of national unity. Governments, public institutions, cooks, and gourmets also participated in this informal contract of building a culinary identity for the nation.

The Industrial Revolution brought mass production, mass marketing, and standardization of food. Factories processed, preserved, canned, and packaged a wide variety of foods, and processed cereals quickly became a defining feature of the American breakfast. In the 1920s, freezing methods, cafeterias, and fast food restaurants emerged.

== Ingredients ==
Most ingredients in cooking are derived from living organisms. Vegetables, fruits, grains, and nuts, as well as herbs and spices come from plants, while meat, eggs, and dairy products come from animals. Mushrooms and the yeast used in baking are kinds of fungi. Cooks also use water and minerals such as salt. Cooks can also use wine or spirits.

Naturally occurring ingredients contain various amounts of molecules called proteins, carbohydrates and fats. They also contain water and minerals. Cooking involves manipulating the chemical properties of these molecules.

=== Carbohydrates ===
Carbohydrates include the common sugar, sucrose (table sugar), a disaccharide, and such simple sugars as glucose (made by enzymatic splitting of sucrose) and fructose (from fruit), and starches from sources such as cereal flour, rice, arrowroot and potato.

The interaction of heat and carbohydrate is complex. Long-chain sugars such as starch tend to break down into more digestible simpler sugars. If the sugars are heated so that all water of crystallisation is driven off, caramelization starts, with the sugar undergoing thermal decomposition with the formation of carbon, and other breakdown products producing caramel. Similarly, the heating of sugars and proteins causes the Maillard reaction, a basic flavor-enhancing technique.

An emulsion of starch with fat or water can, when gently heated, thicken the dish being cooked. In European cooking, a mixture of butter and flour called a roux is used to thicken liquids, such as stews and sauces. In Asian cooking, a similar effect is obtained from a mixture of rice or corn starch and water. These techniques rely on the properties of starches to create simpler mucilaginous saccharides during cooking, which causes the familiar thickening of sauces. This thickening will, however, break down under additional heat.

=== Fats ===
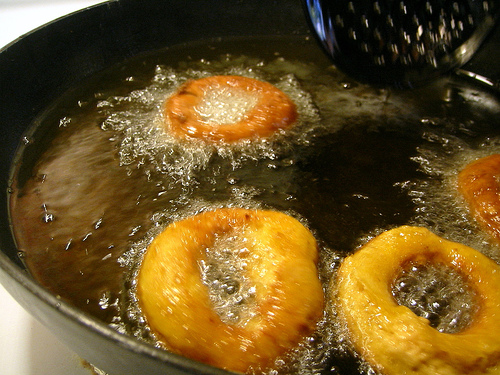
Doughnuts frying in oil

Types of fat include vegetable oils, animal products such as butter and lard, as well as fats from grains, including maize and flax oils. Fats are used in many ways in cooking and baking. To prepare stir-fries, grilled cheese, or pancakes, the pan or griddle is often coated with fat or oil. Fats are also used as an ingredient in baked goods such as cookies, cakes, and pies. Fats can reach temperatures above the boiling point of water and are often used to transfer high heat to other ingredients, such as in frying, deep-frying, or sautéing. Fats are used to add flavor to food (e.g., butter or bacon fat), prevent food from sticking to pans, and create a desirable texture.

Fats are one of the three main macronutrient groups in human diet, along with carbohydrates and proteins, and the main components of common food products like milk, butter, tallow, lard, salt pork, and cooking oils. They are a major and dense source of food energy for many animals and play important structural and metabolic functions, in most living beings, including energy storage, waterproofing, and thermal insulation. The human body can produce the fat it requires from other food ingredients, except for a few essential fatty acids that must be included in the diet. Dietary fats are also the carriers of some flavor and aroma ingredients and vitamins that are not water-soluble.

=== Proteins ===
Edible animal material, including muscle, offal, milk, eggs and egg whites, contains substantial amounts of protein. Almost all vegetable matter (in particular legumes and seeds) also includes proteins, although generally in smaller amounts. Mushrooms have high protein content. Any of these may be sources of essential amino acids. When proteins are heated they become denatured (unfolded) and change texture. In many cases, this causes the material to become softer or more friable – meat becomes cooked and is more friable and less flexible. In some cases, proteins can form more rigid structures, such as the coagulation of albumen in egg whites. The formation of a relatively rigid yet flexible matrix from egg white is an important component in baking cakes and underpins many desserts based on meringue.

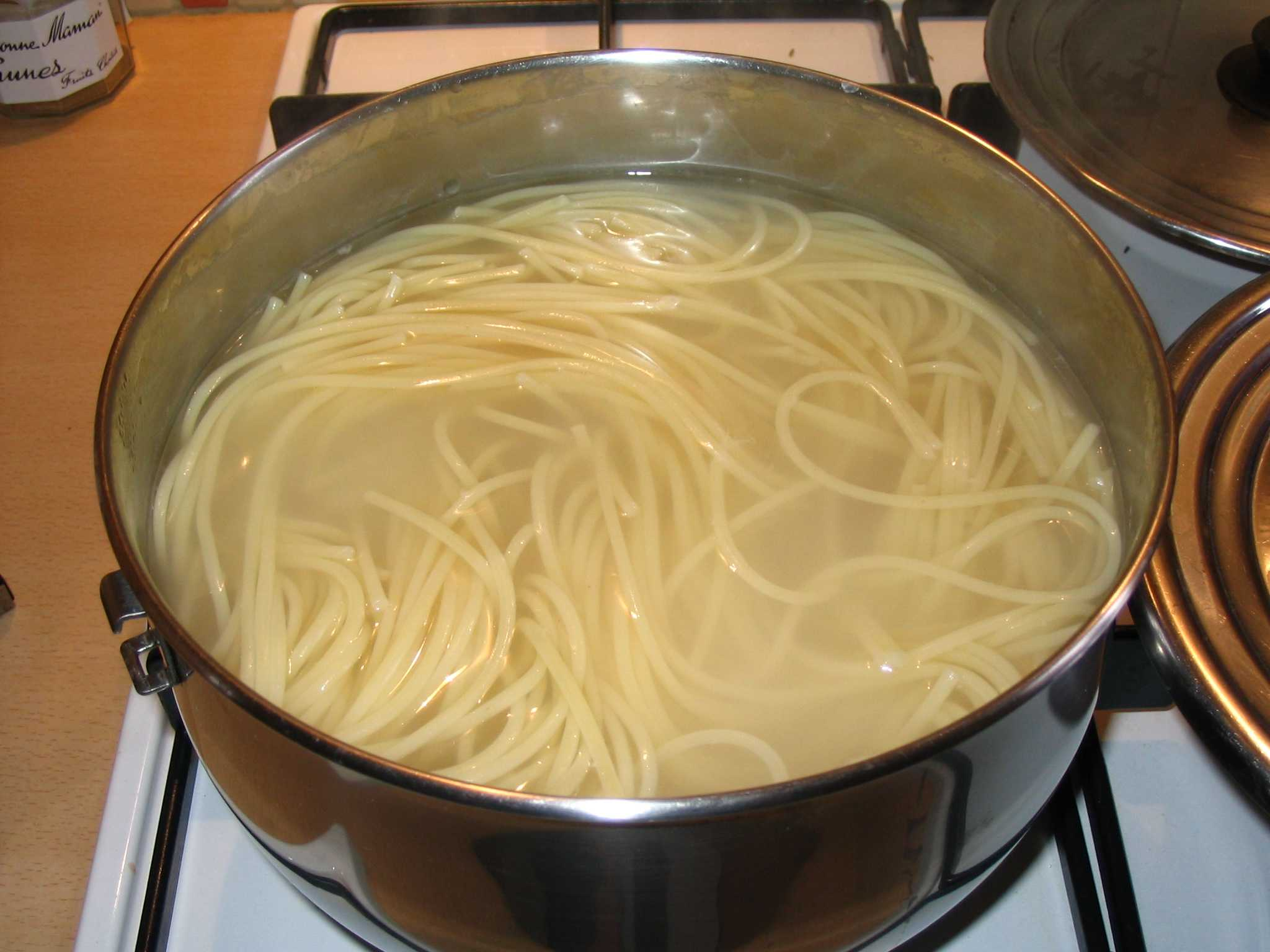
Water is often used to cook foods such as noodles.

=== Water ===
Cooking often involves water and water-based liquids. These can be added to immerse the ingredients being cooked (typically water, stock, or wine). Alternatively, the foods themselves can release water. A favorite method of adding flavor to dishes is to save the liquid for use in other recipes. Liquids are so important to cooking that the name of the cooking method used is often based on how the liquid is combined with the food, as in steaming, simmering, boiling, braising, and blanching. Heating liquid in an open container results in rapidly increased evaporation, which concentrates the remaining flavor and ingredients; this is a critical component of both stewing and sauce making.

=== Vitamins and minerals ===
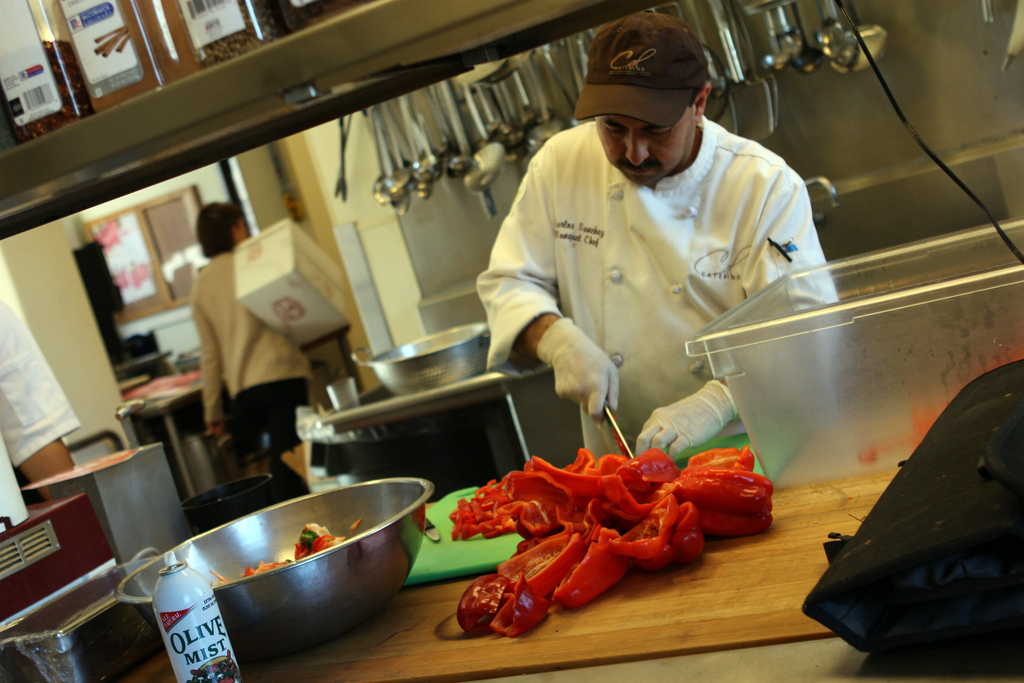
Vegetables contain important vitamins and minerals.

Vitamins and minerals are required for normal metabolism; and what the body cannot manufacture itself must come from external sources. Vitamins come from several sources including fresh fruit and vegetables (Vitamin C), carrots, liver (Vitamin A), cereal bran, bread, liver (B vitamins), fish liver oil (Vitamin D) and fresh green vegetables (Vitamin K). Many minerals are also essential in small quantities, including iron, calcium, magnesium, sodium chloride, and sulfur; and in very small quantities, copper, zinc, and selenium. The micronutrients, minerals, and vitamins in fruit and vegetables may be destroyed or eluted by cooking. Vitamin C is especially prone to oxidation during cooking and may be destroyed by protracted cooking. The bioavailability of some vitamins such as thiamin, vitamin B6, niacin, folate, and carotenoids are increased with cooking by being freed from the food microstructure. Blanching or steaming vegetables is a way of minimizing vitamin and mineral loss in cooking.

== Methods ==
There are many methods of cooking, most of which have been known since antiquity. These include baking, roasting, frying, grilling, barbecuing, smoking, boiling, steaming, and braising. A more recent innovation is microwaving. Various methods use differing levels of heat and moisture and vary in cooking time. The method chosen greatly affects the result. Some major hot cooking techniques include:

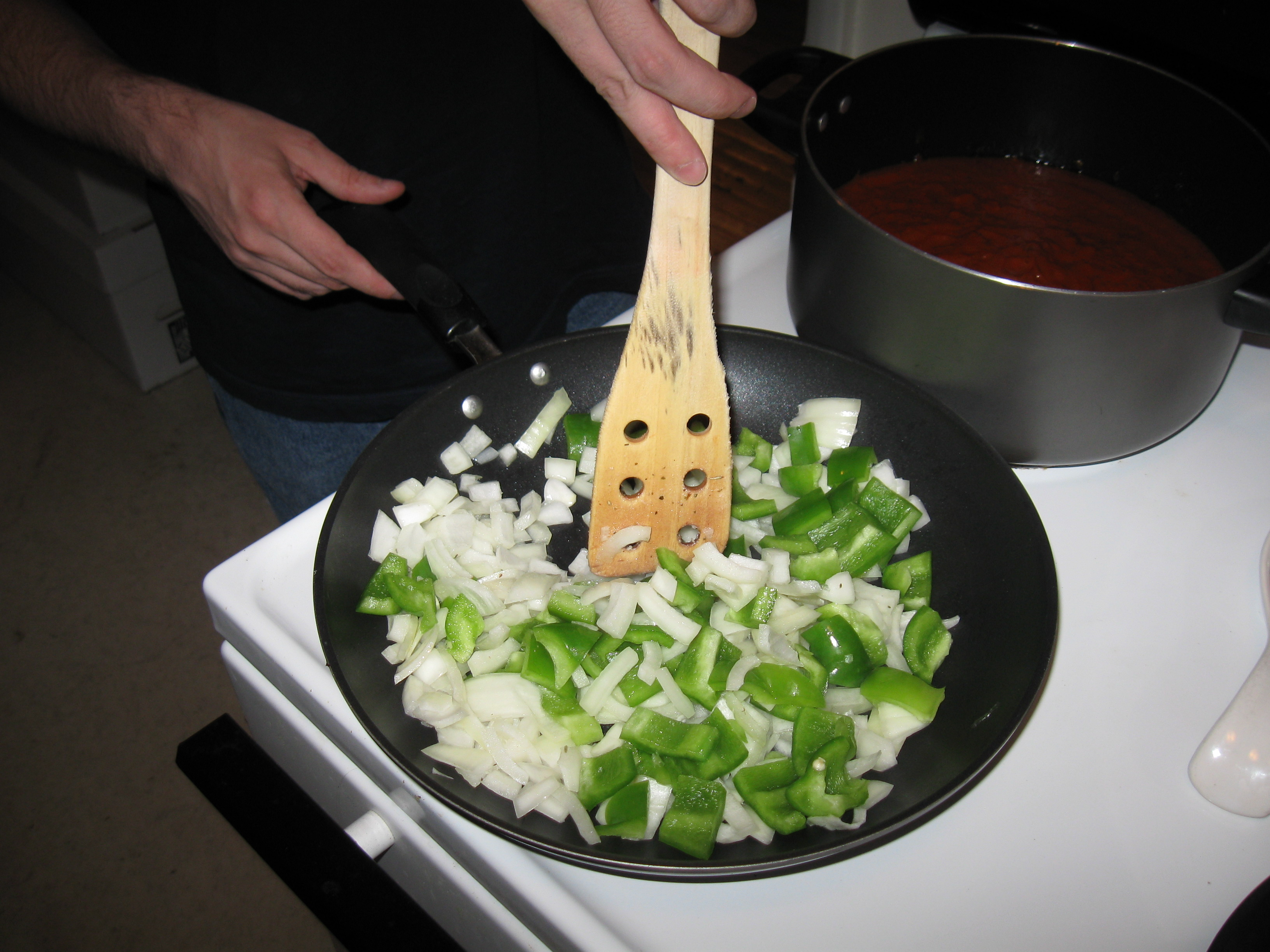
A cook sautees onions and green peppers in a skillet.

Roasting
Roasting – Barbecuing – Grilling/Broiling – Rotisserie – Searing
Baking
Baking – Blind-baking
Boiling
Boiling – Blanching – Braising – Coddling – Double steaming – Infusion – Poaching – Pressure cooking – Simmering – Smothering – Steaming – Steeping – Stewing – Stone boiling – Vacuum flask cooking
Frying
Frying – Air frying — Deep frying – Gentle frying – Hot salt frying – Hot sand frying – Pan frying – Pressure frying – Sautéing – Shallow frying – Stir frying – Vacuum frying
Steaming
Steaming works by continuously boiling water, which vaporizes into steam; the steam then transfers heat to the food, cooking it. Many consider it a healthy form of cooking, as it helps retain nutrients in the vegetables or meat being cooked.
En papillote – The food is placed in a pouch and then baked, allowing its own moisture to steam it.
Smoking
Smoking is the process of flavoring, cooking, or preserving food by exposing it to smoke from burning or smoldering material, most often wood.
Sous vide
Sous vide is a method of cooking where the food is placed into a plastic pouch or glass jar which is then sealed (often in a vacuum) and cooked in a water bath at precise temperatures for longer than normal cooking times, sometimes up to days.

== Health and safety ==
=== Indoor air pollution ===
As of 2021, over 2.6 billion people cook with open fires or inefficient stoves that use kerosene, biomass, and coal as fuel. These cooking practices use fuels and technologies that produce high levels of household air pollution, causing 3.8 million premature deaths annually. Of these deaths, 27% are from pneumonia, 27% from ischaemic heart disease, 20% from chronic obstructive pulmonary disease, 18% from stroke, and 8% from lung cancer. Women and young children are disproportionately affected, since they spend the most time near the hearth.

=== Security while cooking ===
Hazards while cooking can include:

- Unseen slippery surfaces (such as from oil stains, water droplets, or items that have fallen on the floor)
- Cuts; about a third of the US's estimated annual 400,000 knife injuries are kitchen-related.
- Burns or fires

To prevent those injuries, safety measures include heat-resistant clothing, anti-slip shoes, a fire extinguisher, and more.

=== Food safety ===
Cooking can prevent many foodborne illnesses that would otherwise occur if raw food is consumed. When heat is used in the preparation of food, it can kill or inactivate harmful organisms, such as bacteria and viruses, as well as various parasites such as tapeworms and Toxoplasma gondii. Food poisoning and other illness from uncooked or poorly prepared food may be caused by bacteria such as pathogenic strains of Escherichia coli, Salmonella typhimurium and Campylobacter, viruses such as noroviruses, and protozoa such as Entamoeba histolytica. Bacteria, viruses, and parasites may be introduced through salad, meat that is uncooked or done rare, and unboiled water.

The sterilizing effect of cooking depends on temperature, cooking time, and the technique used. Some food spoilage bacteria, such as Clostridium botulinum or Bacillus cereus, can form spores that survive cooking or boiling, which then germinate and regrow after the food has cooled. This makes it unsafe to reheat cooked food more than once.

Cooking increases the digestibility of many foods that are inedible or poisonous when raw. For example, raw cereal grains are hard to digest, while kidney beans are toxic when raw or improperly cooked due to the presence of phytohaemagglutinin, which is inactivated by cooking for at least ten minutes at 100 °C (212 °F).

Food safety depends on the safe preparation, handling, and storage of food. Food spoilage bacteria proliferate in the "Danger zone" temperature range from 40 to 140 °F (4 to 60 °C); therefore, food should not be stored in this temperature range. Washing of hands and surfaces, especially when handling different meats, and keeping raw food separate from cooked food to avoid cross-contamination, are good practices in food preparation. Foods prepared on plastic cutting boards may be less likely to harbor bacteria than wooden ones. Washing and disinfecting cutting boards, especially after use with raw meat, poultry, or seafood, reduces the risk of contamination.

=== Effects on nutritional content of food ===
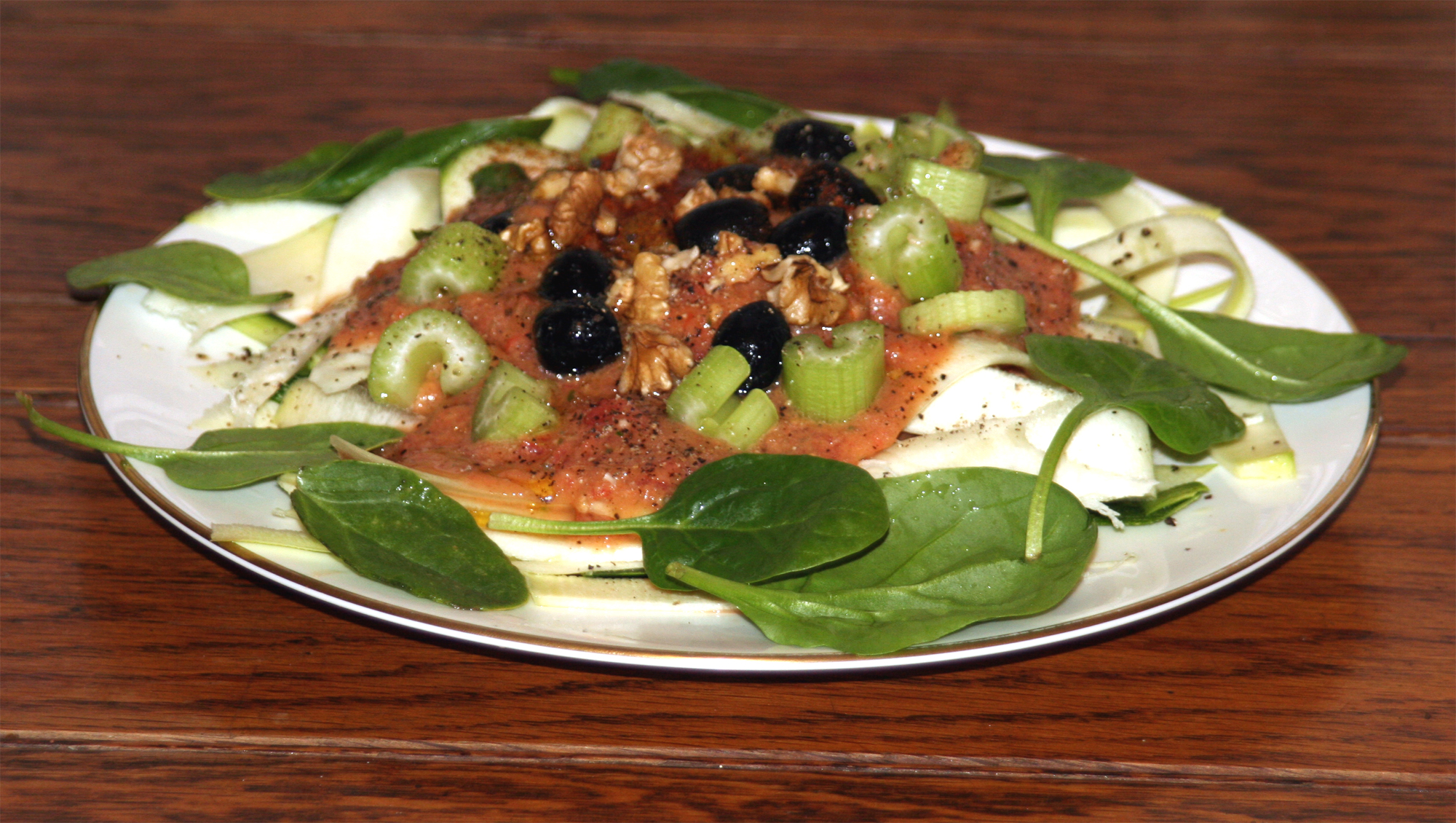
A raw tomato sauce with olives, celery, spinach and walnuts on zucchini noodles.

Proponents of raw foodism argue that cooking food increases the risk of certain detrimental effects on food or health. They point out that when cooking vegetables and fruits rich in vitamin C, the vitamin leaches into the cooking water and is degraded by oxidation. Peeling vegetables can also substantially reduce vitamin C content, especially in potatoes, where most of the vitamin C is in the skin. However, research has shown that in the specific case of carotenoids, a greater proportion is absorbed from cooked vegetables than from raw vegetables.

Sulforaphane, a glucosinolate breakdown product, is present in vegetables such as broccoli, and is mostly destroyed when the vegetable is boiled. Although there has been some basic research on how sulforaphane might exert beneficial effects in vivo, there is no high-quality evidence for its efficacy against human diseases.

The United States Department of Agriculture has studied retention data for 16 vitamins, 8 minerals, and alcohol for approximately 290 foods across various cooking methods.

=== Carcinogens and AGEs ===
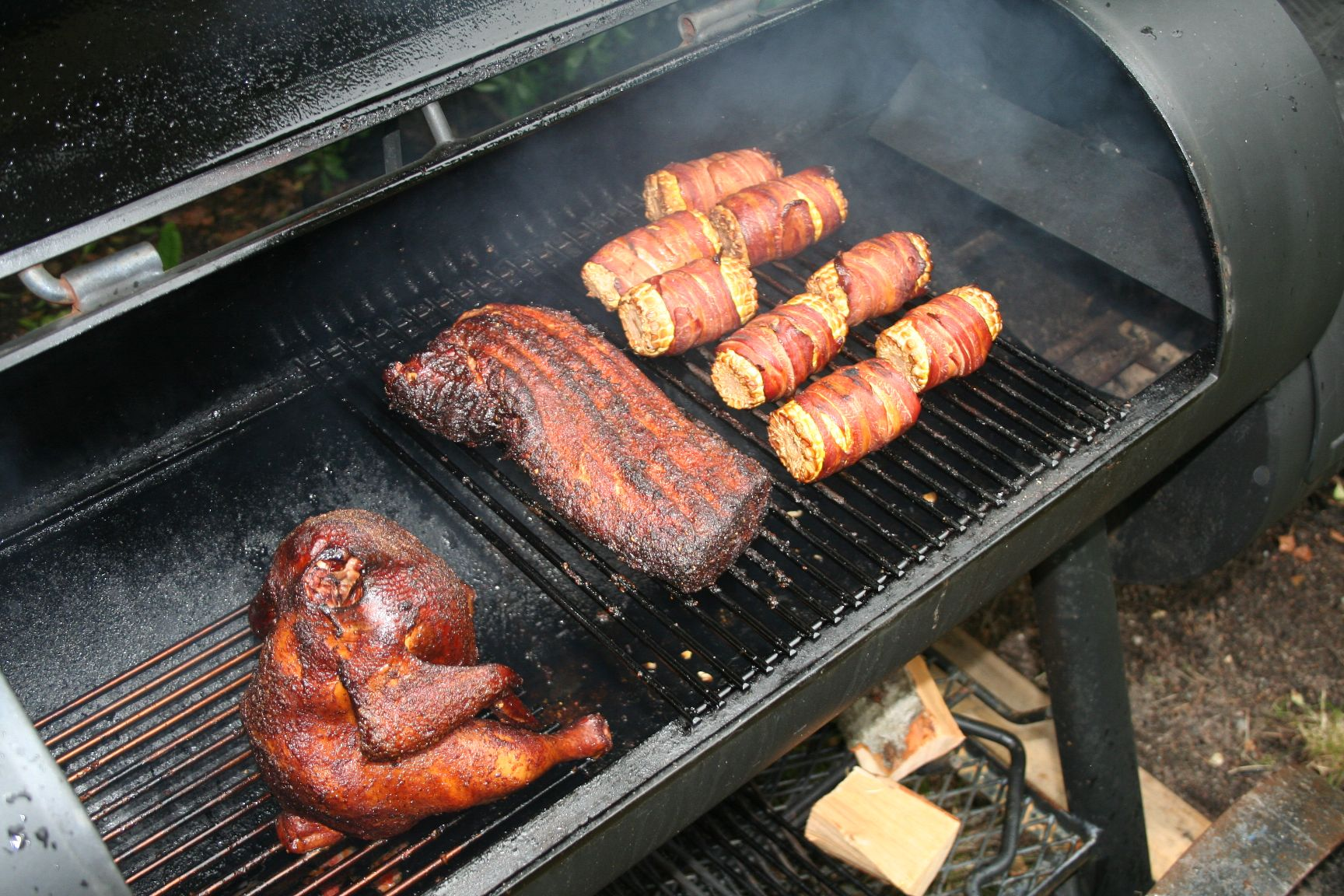
Chicken, pork and bacon-wrapped corn cooking in a barbecue smoker. Studies show that barbecuing and smoking generate carcinogens.

In a human epidemiological analysis by Richard Doll and Richard Peto in 1981, diet was estimated to account for a large proportion of cancers. Studies suggest that around 32% of cancer deaths may be avoidable by changes to the diet. Some of these cancers may be caused by carcinogens in food generated during the cooking process, although it is often difficult to identify the specific components in diet that serve to increase cancer risk.

Several studies published since 1990 indicate that cooking meat at high temperature creates heterocyclic amines (HCA's), which are thought to increase cancer risk in humans. Researchers at the National Cancer Institute found that human subjects who ate beef rare or medium-rare had less than one-third the risk of stomach cancer than those who ate beef medium-well or well-done. While avoiding meat or eating meat raw may be the only ways to avoid HCA's in meat fully, the National Cancer Institute states that cooking meat below 212 °F (100 °C) creates "negligible amounts" of HCA's. Also, microwaving meat before cooking may reduce HCAs by 90% by reducing the time needed for the meat to be cooked at high heat. Nitrosamines are found in some food, and may be produced by some cooking processes from proteins or from nitrites used as food preservatives; cured meat such as bacon is carcinogenic, with links to colon cancer. Ascorbate, which is added to cured meat, however, reduces nitrosamine formation.

Baking, grilling, or broiling food, especially starchy foods, until a toasted crust is formed generates significant concentrations of acrylamide. This discovery in 2002 led to international health concerns. Subsequent research has, however, found that it is not likely that the acrylamides in burnt or well-cooked food cause cancer in humans; Cancer Research UK categorizes the idea that burnt food causes cancer as a "myth".

Cooking food at high temperatures may create advanced glycation end-products (AGEs) that are believed to be involved in several diseases, including diabetes, chronic kidney disease, cancer, and cardiovascular diseases, as well as in aging. AGEs are a group of compounds that are formed between reducing sugars and amino acids via the Maillard reaction. These compounds impart colors, tastes, and smells specific to these foods but may also be deleterious to health. Dry heat (e.g. in roasting or grilling) can significantly increase the production of AGEs, as well as food rich in animal protein and fats. The production of AGEs during cooking can be significantly reduced by cooking in water or other moist heat, by reducing cooking times and temperatures, and by marinating the meat in acidic ingredients such as lemon juice and vinegar beforehand.

== Scientific aspects ==
The scientific study of cooking has become known as molecular gastronomy. This is a subdiscipline of food science concerning the physical and chemical transformations that occur during cooking.

Important contributions have been made by scientists, chefs and authors such as Hervé This (chemist), Nicholas Kurti (physicist), Peter Barham (physicist), Harold McGee (author), Shirley Corriher (biochemist, author), Robert Wolke (chemist, author.) It is different for the application of scientific knowledge to cooking, that is "molecular cooking" (for the technique) or "molecular cuisine" (for a culinary style), for which chefs such as Raymond Blanc, Philippe and Christian Conticini, Ferran Adria, Heston Blumenthal, Pierre Gagnaire (chef).

Chemical processes central to cooking include hydrolysis (in particular beta elimination of pectins, during the thermal treatment of plant tissues), pyrolysis, and glycation reactions wrongly named Maillard reactions.

Cooking food with heat depends on many factors: the specific heat of an object, thermal conductivity, and (perhaps most significantly) the temperature difference between the two objects. Thermal diffusivity is the combination of specific heat, conductivity, and density that determines how long it will take for the food to reach a certain temperature.

== Home-cooking and commercial cooking ==
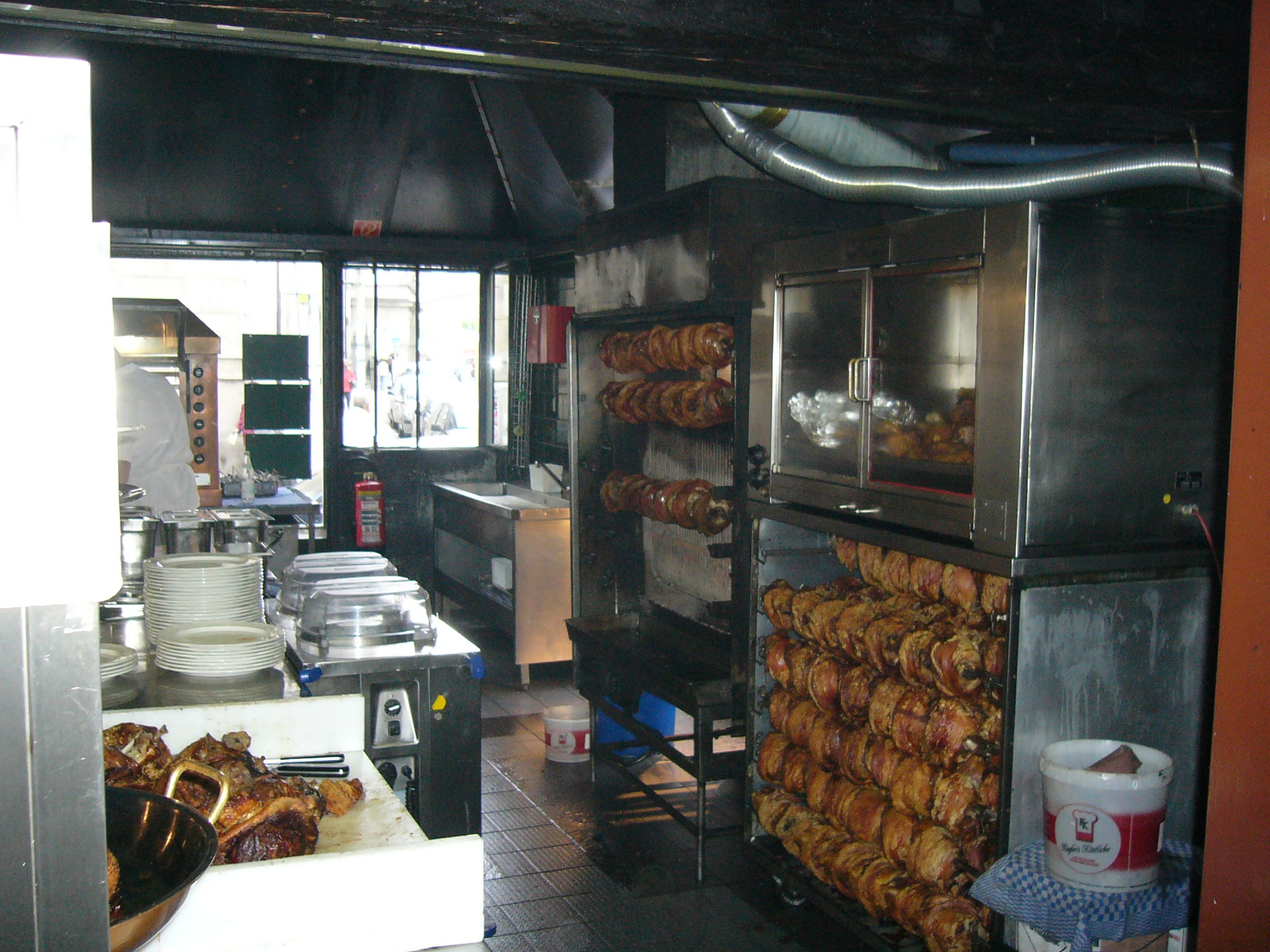
A restaurant kitchen in Munich, Germany (Haxnbauer restaurant)

Home cooking has traditionally been a process carried out informally in a home or around a communal fire, and can be enjoyed by all members of the family, although in many cultures women bear primary responsibility. Cooking is also often carried out outside of personal quarters, for example at restaurants, or schools. Bakeries were among the earliest forms of cooking outside the home, and in the past, often offered cooking for pots of food that customers provided as an additional service. In the present day, factory food preparation has become common, with many "ready-to-eat" as well as "ready-to-cook" foods being prepared and cooked in factories, and home cooks using a mixture of scratch made, and factory-made foods together to make a meal. The nutritional value of including more commercially prepared foods is inferior to that of home-made foods. Home-cooked meals tend to be healthier with fewer calories, and less saturated fat, cholesterol and sodium on a per calorie basis while providing more fiber, calcium, and iron. The ingredients are also directly sourced, so there is control over authenticity, taste, and nutritional value. The superior nutritional quality of home-cooking could therefore play a role in preventing chronic disease. Cohort studies following the elderly over 10 years show that adults who cook their own meals have significantly lower mortality, even when controlling for confounding variables.

"Home-cooking" may be associated with comfort food, and some commercially produced foods and restaurant meals are presented through advertising or packaging as having been "home-cooked", regardless of their actual origin. This trend began in the 1920s and is attributed to people in urban areas of the U.S. wanting homestyle food, even though their schedules and smaller kitchens made cooking harder.

== See also ==
- Carryover cooking
- Cookbook
- Cooker
- Cooking weights and measures
- Culinary arts
- Culinary profession
- Cooking school
- Dishwashing
- Food and cooking hygiene
- Food industry
- Food preservation
- Food writing
- Foodpairing
- Gourmet Museum and Library
- High altitude cooking
- Ingredient
- International food terms
- List of cooking appliances
- List of cuisines
- List of films about cooking
- List of food preparation utensils
- List of ovens
- List of stoves
- Scented water
- Solar cooker
- Staple (cooking)
