= Taguella =

Tuareg flatbread

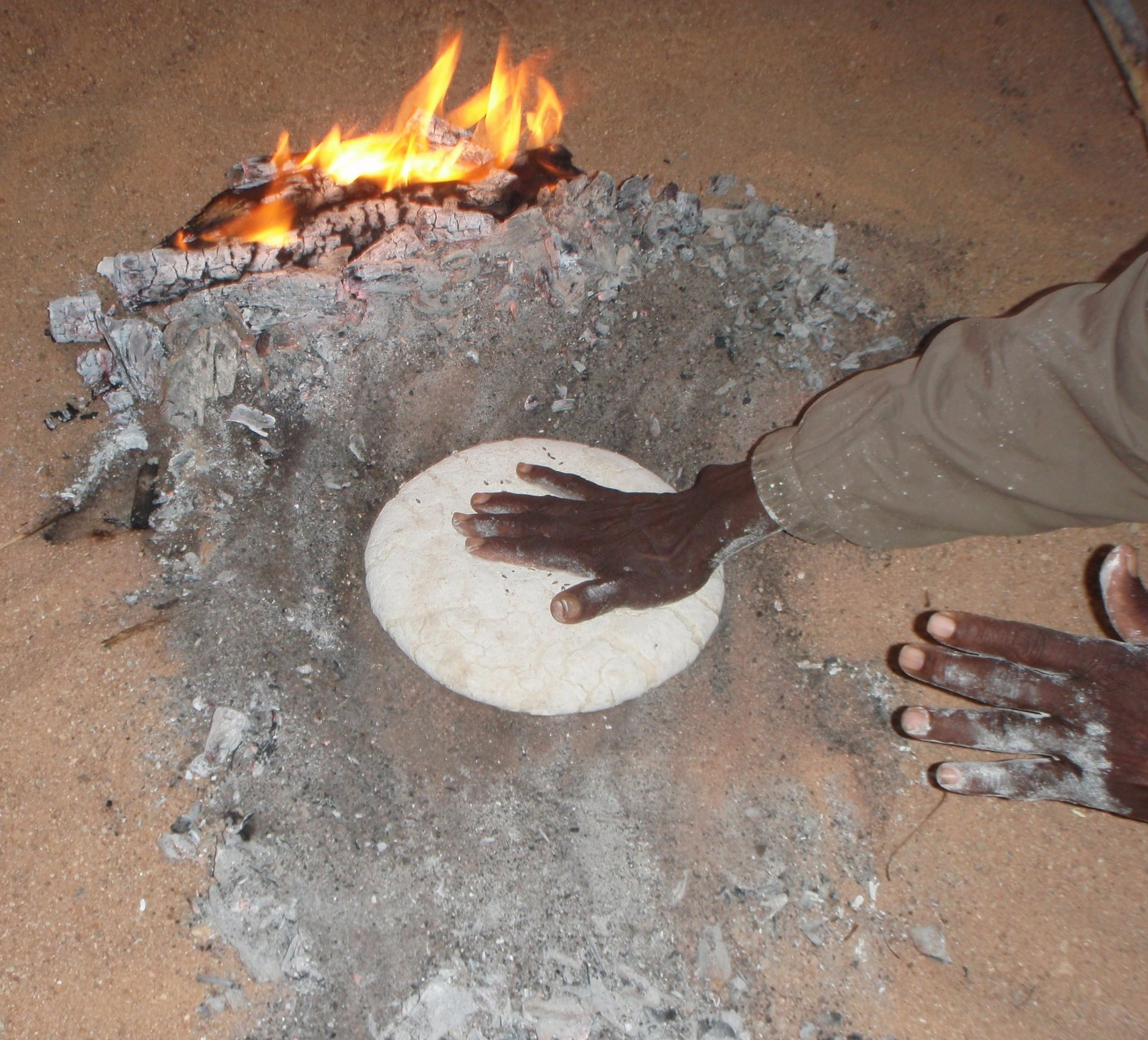
- A flat taguella being cooked in the remains of a desert fire.
- Course: Main course
- Region or state: Sahara, Algeria
- Associated cuisine: Algerian cuisine
- Serving temperature: Hot

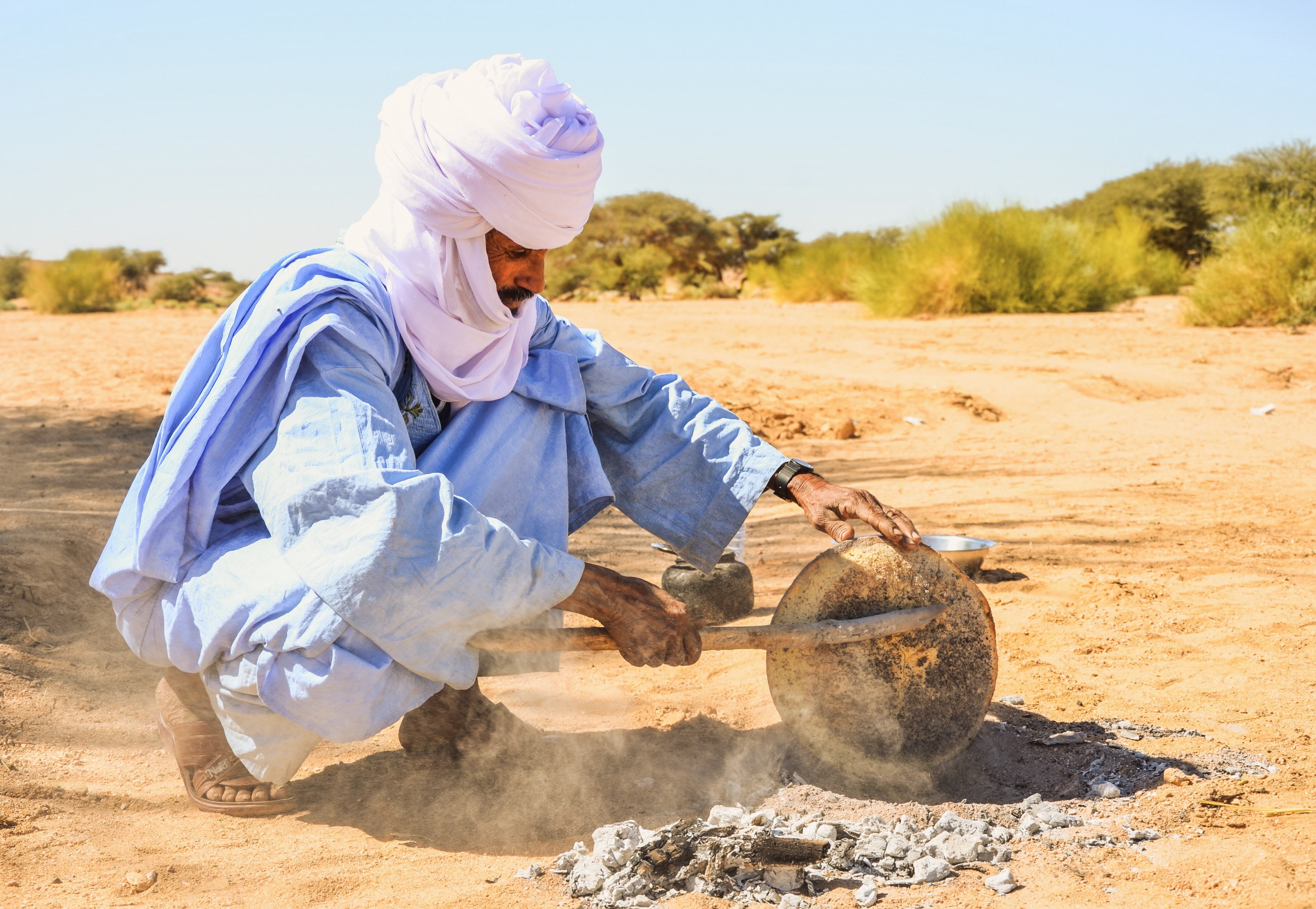
An Algerian man of Kel Ahaggar heritage cooks Taguella in hot ashes

Taguella (tagǝlla) is a flatbread, the staple dish of Tuareg people living in the Sahara. It is a disk-shaped bread made from wheat flour and cooked buried underneath the hot sand and charcoal of a small fire. The bread is then broken up into small pieces and eaten with a meat sauce.

Can also be eaten with butter, onions, dried tomatoes or other elements, usually followed by a glass of Algerian mint tea.

== Description ==
Served in a large flat, as a single dish or served with sheep meat, accompanied by goat, camel or sheep milk, and tea. The taguella is the emblematic dish of Tuaregs and also their food base.

The taguella is a thick, unleavened galette. It is made of semolina, wheat or millet, sometimes mixed with flour. After being kneaded (for twenty minutes) and then baked in the embers of a fire in ash and sand; with the right hand, Tuaregs eat it with a sauce of tomatoes and vegetables, or various meats, or chili or soup and sometimes flavored with wild fennel.

== Quote ==
To make a taguella, poured into a bowl of flour and water and mix with a spoon until it forms a homogeneous liquid with the consistency of a medium thick sauce; we made a fire in a place covered with sand and clean; when the fire has no flame and there are only embers, it deviates slightly them, so as to leave uncovered or only covered a few ashes, soil, sand; in this hot sand or hot ashes these, we practice a hollow round, 4 to 5 cm depth and width such that it can contain the flour mixture and water; poured this mixture into the hollow; it is slightly dry to the surface by passing a short distance above him for a short time in the grassland fire flame; then covered with ashes of bread, and put an ember bed above the ash. When one considers sufficiently baked bread in its upper part, it spreads the embers and ashes, we return the bread, and the covers again topped ash coals for the party previously rested on the sand cooks turn; when it is cooked, removed ash bread and the washing with water and is ready to be eaten.

— Charles de Foucauld

== See also ==
- Ash cake
- Berber cuisine
- Algerian cuisine
