= Ash cake =

Bread buried in hot ashes and cinders

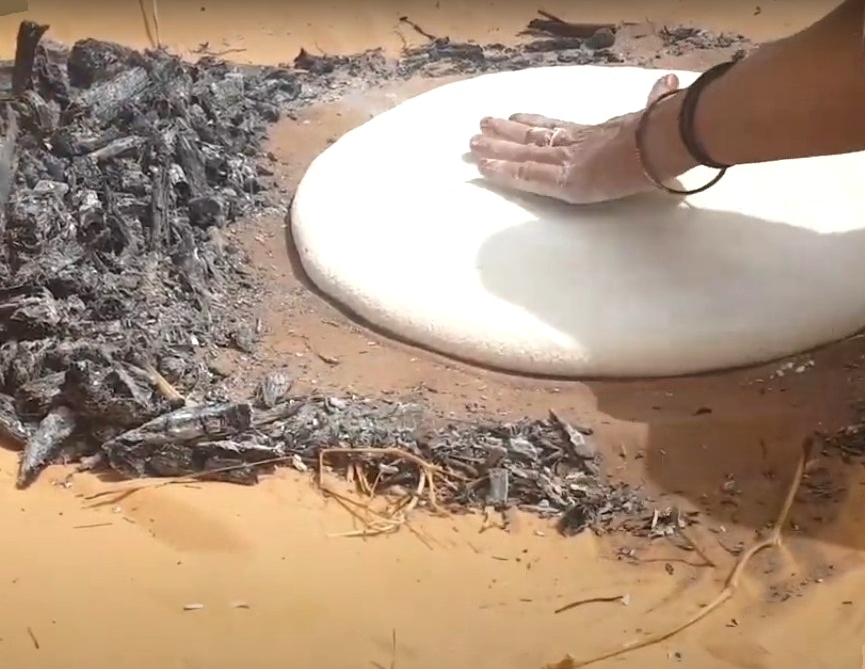
- Woman preparing an ash cake over hot sand
- Alternative names: Ash bread; Fire cake
- Type: Flatbread
- Region or state: Yemen, Arabia
- Main ingredients: Dough (flour, yeast, water, salt)

Ash cake (also known as ash bread or fire cake) is a type of bread baked over a layer of heated stones or sand and covered in hot ashes, a practice still found principally in Arabian countries, especially among Bedouins.

== Recipe ==
Epiphanius (c. 310–403), in his work entitled On Weights and Measures, includes an anecdote about the practice of baking ash cakes, which in Hebrew he calls ugoth (Hebrew: עֻגוֹת ʿugōṯ, lit. 'cakes'):

When the bread (fine flour) has been kneaded and has afterward fermented, it is kneaded again. They bake this bread not in an oven but on a rock. Collecting smooth stones and piling them upon the ground, by means of much brushwood they heat them until they make of the smooth (stones) glowing embers. Then they remove the ashes from them, cover them with dough, and again spread the ashes over all the dough, spreading it out as one loaf, and hence it is called "hidden," because [it is] concealed in the ashes.

According to Epiphanius, the Hebrew name for this bread is derived, etymologically, from its manner of being baked as "bread that is hidden." Once the bread is baked, it is removed from the ashes and the ashes brushed off before allowing the bread to cool.

Epiphanius adds that it is the bread described in Genesis 18:6, when Sarah, the wife of Abraham, is enjoined by her husband to knead three measures of fine meal and to bake cakes for the visiting angels.

== Other methods of preparation ==
In northern Yemen, ash cakes were called jamrī (جَمْرِي), typically made thick, and baked directly over coals kept in a special vessel made of basalt-stone. In some places, ashes are spread over the face of the dough before being embedded entirely within the hot coals. Bedouins in Yemen would not embed the dough within hot coals, but rather stick the dough on the backside of an iron skillet, and fill the hollow space of the skillet with hot coals. In Arabia, ash cake is served with a treacle of date syrup (dibs) and with clarified butter (samne).

In northern Iran, ash-cakes are prepared by laying out the dough over live coals carried in a brazier, upon which dough several pieces of hot coals are also carefully laid. Since the bread comes out hard and dry, it is customarily practised to break up the bread into small pieces and to mix it with butter and work it with one's hands to be formed into a ball before it can be made palatable.

In North America, ash cakes were primarily made by using cornmeal. Enslaved African Americans often relied on ash cakes as a staple food. This tradition was likely influenced by Native American techniques for making thinly leavened breads. The manner of preparation varied, although one popular method was to brush aside the hot ashes, lay a large collard green or cabbage leaf upon the hot earth or cast-iron oven, upon which was poured a batter of cornmeal, and over which was laid another leaf, and the hot ashes piled thereon.

In Europe, ash cakes were made into a small, round and flat loaf, usually consisting of a little wheat and sometimes rye, baked under an inverted iron pan over which the ashes of the fire were heaped. This was almost exclusively the bread of the peasants. In French, this type of bread was called fougasse.

=== Classic literature ===
In classic Hebrew literature, the words עֻגַת רְצָפִים described in the Hebrew Bible are explained by a consortium of commentators (Rashi, Radak, Joseph Kara, Ralbag, Malbim, among others) as having the connotation of a cake baked on hot stones, coals or cinders. The ash-cake described by A. Mizrachi, or what is called by him jamrī (جَمْرِي), is also baked directly over coals and thought to be a delicacy in South-Arabia. Nathan ben Abraham, the 11th-century Mishnah exegete, explains the method of making a type of ash cake (ma'asei re'afīm) in Palestine. They would bake the cake by heating to fire temperature broken potsherds and spreading the dough over them. Maimonides says that the dough, in this case, was spread over hot tiles and a lid-covering placed over it.

== See also ==
- Damper bread
- List of flatbreads
- Johnnycake
- Taguella
