= Coddling =

Cooking method

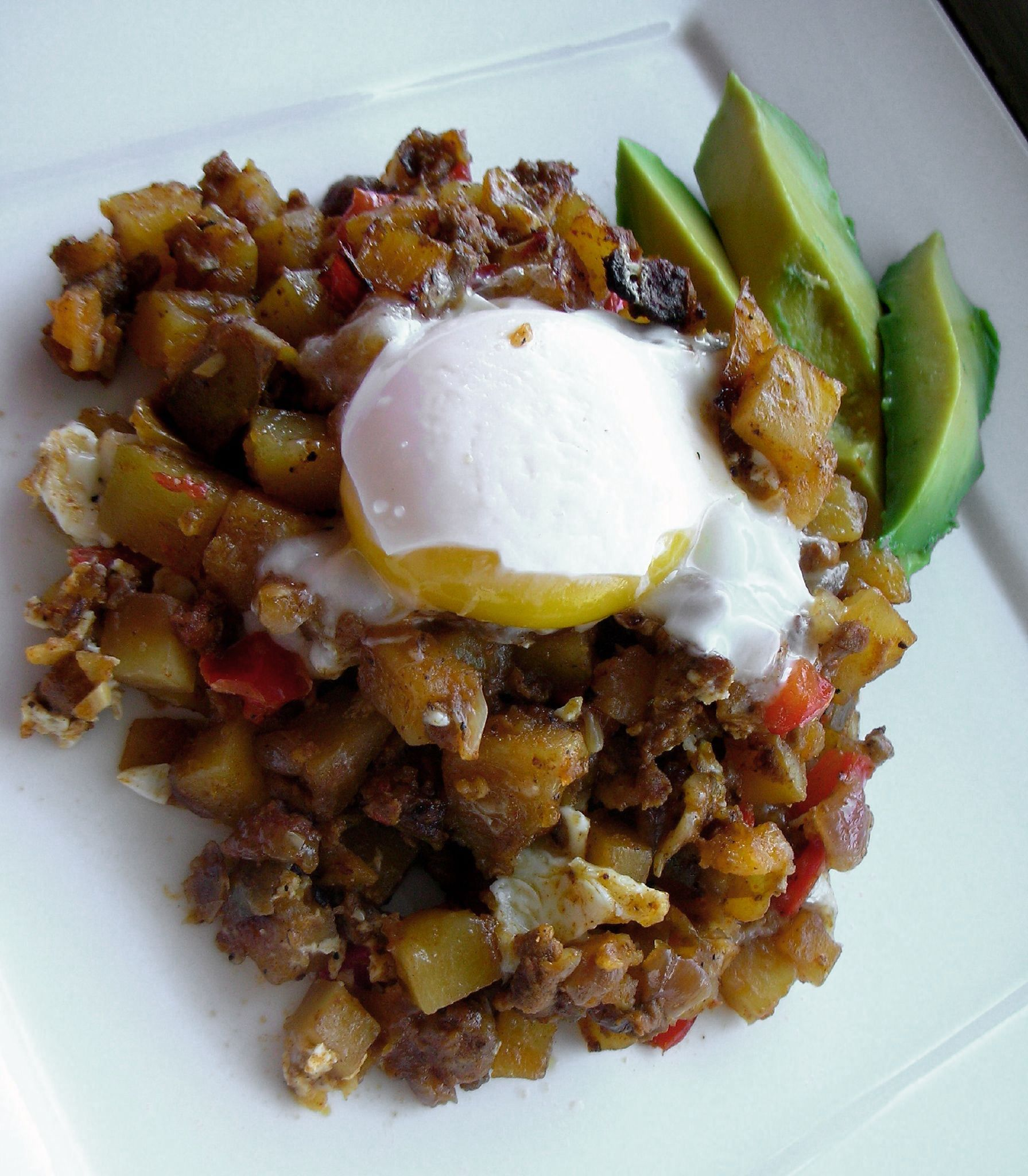
Coddled egg

In cooking, to coddle food is to heat it in water kept just below the boiling point. In the past, recipes called for coddling fruit, but in recent times the term is usually only applied to coddled eggs. Coddling differs from poaching in that the coddled ingredient is not placed directly in hot water, but instead in a small dish placed in a hot water bath. The process is either done in a regular pan or pot filled with water, either on the stovetop or placed in the oven, or through the use of a special device such as an "egg coddler" (originally known as a pipkin). The oven technique is similar to the preparation of baked eggs, the difference being that the preparation of baked eggs does not have to employ a water bath.

The word coddle evolved from the name of a warm drink, "caudle", and ultimately derived from the Latin word for warm drink, calidium.

Comparing the coddling cooking technique to boiling when it comes to whole eggs, the process of coddling takes a longer time due to the use of a lower cooking temperature, but it produces a more tender egg.

== See also ==
- Poaching
- Simmering
