= Double steaming =

Cooking technique

Double steaming, sometimes called double boiling, is a Chinese cooking technique to prepare delicate food such as bird's nest soup and shark fin soup. The food is covered with water and put in a covered ceramic jar and the jar is then steamed for several hours. This technique ensures there is no loss of liquid or moisture (its essences) from the food being cooked, hence it is often used with expensive ingredients like Chinese herbal medicines.

In Cantonese, double steaming is called dun (simplified Chinese: 炖; traditional Chinese: 燉; pinyin: dùn). The meaning of the Chinese character for dun in Cantonese is different from that in Mandarin, because dun means to simmer or stew in Mandarin. This technique is also common in Fujian, a neighbouring province of Guangdong (Canton).

In ancient China, the double steaming method was based on the Chinese philosophy of maintaining health through diet dates as far back as the 6th century BC, when the founder of Taoism, Lao Tzu, famously said, “medicine and food are from the same source”.It was mostly used on the emperor's meal during the fall and winter of the year, when most people are more easily getting sick. The significant difference between its and other meals is that it can cooked expensive food and Precious medicinal materials into one meal. It was served to the emperor for nourishment purpose and continued in modern time.

This technique is said to achieve the maximum extraction of flavour with little compromise to the flavour or texture of the ingredients used. It is therefore the method of choice for coaxing forth the delicate flavour. Full flavour extraction can take up to 5 hours.

== Famous examples ==
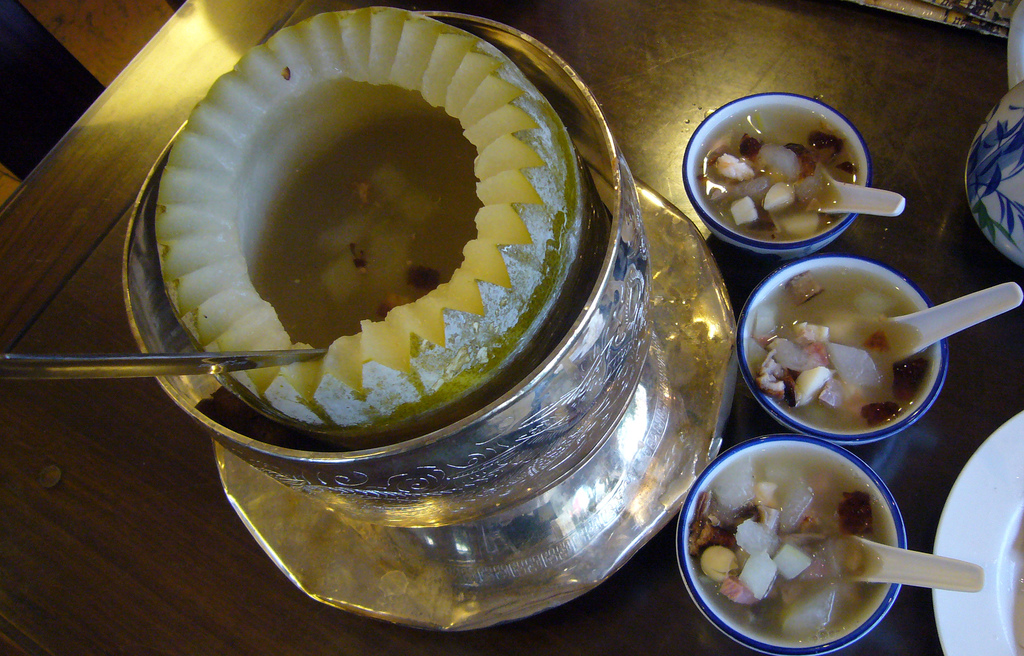
Winter melon soup in winter melon urn

Tong sui, or dessert soups, which contain medicinal herbs can be cooked using double steaming.

Cantonese cuisine is famous for its slow-cooked soup. One famous dish of this kind is called the winter melon urn (冬瓜盅). It is prepared by emptying the inside of a winter melon to make an urn. The outside of the winter melon is often carved with artistic patterns. The inside is then filled with soup ingredients, such as Chinese cured ham, and Chinese herbs. The whole urn, complete with its original melon lid, is double-steamed for four hours. The flavour of the soup is soaked into the flesh of the melon. The whole melon and its contents are brought to the dinner table. The soup is served by scooping out the liquid and the inside wall of the melon. In this case, the edible melon takes the place of the double steaming jar. This application is possible because winter melon has a waxy, and thus waterproof, rind. Winter melon is believed to be nourishing and it is seldom cooked with ingredients that are believed to be too yin or too yang.

A dessert dish called double-steamed frog ovaries in a coconut (椰青燉雪蛤膏) is traditionally prepared for women. Chinese medicinal ingredients (including hasma), spices, and rock sugar, are placed inside a young coconut to soak in the original coconut juice. The filled coconut is then double-steamed for several hours. The whole coconut is served whole at the table after dinner. The contents and the inside wall of the coconut are scooped out to be consumed.

== See also ==
- Steaming
- Simmering
- Double boiler
- Bain-marie
- List of steamed foods
