= Worst Cooks in America season 12 =

Worst Cooks in America
- Season 12
- Judges: Anne Burrell; Tyler Florence
- No. of contestants: 16
- Winner: Hazell Mckenzie
- Winning mentor: Anne Burrell
- Runner-up: Steven Crowley
- No. of episodes: 10

Release
- Original network: Food Network
- Original release: January 7 – March 11, 2018

Season chronology
- ← Previous; Season 11 Next → Season 13

Worst Cooks in America 12, is the twelfth season of the American competitive reality television series Worst Cooks in America. It premiered on Food Network on January 7, 2018, and concluded on March 11, 2018. Hazell Mckenzie was the winner of this season, with Steven Crowley as the runner-up.

== Format ==
Worst Cooks in America is an American reality television series in which contestants (referred to as "recruits") with poor cooking skills undergo a culinary boot camp for the chance to win $25,000 and a Food Network cooking set. The recruits are trained on the various basic cooking techniques including baking, knife skills, temperature, seasoning and preparation. Each episode features two core challenges: the Skills Drill, which tests their grasp of basic techniques demonstrated by the chef mentors, and the Main Dish Challenge, where they must apply those skills to recreate or invent a more complex dish under specific guidelines. The weakest performer is eliminated at the end of each episode. The final two contestants prepare a restaurant-quality, three-course meal for a panel of food critics, who evaluate the dishes based on taste, presentation, and overall improvement.

== Judges ==
Tyler Florence joins Anne Burrell to host season 12. Three contestants from this season—runner-up Steven Crowley, Sharon Shvarzman, and Kevin Pettice—would compete in, season 9 of The Great Food Truck Race.

== Recruits ==
Contestant	Age	Hometown	Occupation	Team	Status
Hazell Mckenzie	36	Brooklyn, New York	Graduate Student	Anne	Winner on March 11, 2018
Steven Crowley	31	New York City	Real estate broker	Tyler	Runner-up on March 11, 2018
Asaf Goren	25	Los Angeles, California	Dancer	Anne	Eliminated on March 4, 2018
Sharon Shvarzman	32	Staten Island, New York	Drag Performer	Tyler	Eliminated on March 4, 2018
Lacey Stout	28	Collinsville, Oklahoma	Stay-at-Home Mom	Anne	Eliminated on February 25, 2018
Shatima Ruffin	34	Hampton Roads, Virginia	Receptionist	Tyler	Eliminated on February 25, 2018
Robyn Hayden	31	Charleston, South Carolina	Balloon Artist	Anne	Eliminated on February 18
Brandon Arroyo	27	Cleveland, Ohio	Sports Reporter	Anne	Eliminated on February 11, 2018
Spencer Nick	25	Chicago, Illinois	Graduate Student	Tyler	Eliminated on February 11, 2018
Sylvia Jefferies	47	Charleston, South Carolina	Stay-at-Home Mom	Anne	Withdrew on January 28, 2018
Lily Frey	63	Anaheim, California	Retired	Tyler	Eliminated on January 28, 2018
Skyler Nick	25	Chicago, Illinois	Graduate Student	Tyler	Eliminated on January 21, 2018
Kevin Pettice	24	Charlotte, North Carolina	Administrative Assistant	Tyler	Eliminated on January 14, 2018
Priscilla Nguyen	26	Hattiesburg, Mississippi	Receptionist	Anne	Eliminated on January 14, 2018
Jonathan Farhat	37	Livermore, California	Safety Professional	Anne	Eliminated on January 7, 2018
Kayrene Curtis	44	Rocky River, Ohio	Stay-at-Home Mom	Tyler	Eliminated on January 7, 2018

== Elimination Chart ==
Team Anne
Team Tyler

* Initially a member of the other team

Rank	Contestant	Episode									
Rank	Contestant	1	2	3	4	5	6	7	8	9	10
1	Hazell	WIN	IN	IN	IN	IN	IN	IN	WIN	WIN	WINNER
2	Steven	BTM	IN	WIN	IN	IN	BTM	TIE	WIN	WIN	RUNNER-UP
3	Asaf	IN	IN	WIN	IN	IN	WIN	IN	BTM	OUT	
4	Sharon	WIN	IN	IN	WIN	WIN	IN	TIE	BTM	OUT	
5	Lacey*	IN	IN	IN	IN	SWAP	IN	WIN	OUT		
6	Shatima	IN	IN	BTM	BTM	BTM	WIN	BTM	OUT		
7	Robyn	IN	IN	IN	WIN	BTM	BTM	OUT			
8	Brandon	IN	WIN	IN	BTM	WIN	OUT				
9	Spencer*	BTM	IN	BTM	IN	SWAP	OUT				
10	Sylvia	IN	BTM	BTM	WDR						
11	Lily	IN	WIN	IN	OUT						
12	Skyler	IN	BTM	OUT							
13	Kevin	IN	OUT								
14	Priscilla	IN	OUT								
15	Jonathan	OUT									
16	Kayrene	OUT									

Key
(WINNER) This contestant won the competition and was crowned "Best of the Worst".
(RUNNER-UP) The contestant was the runner-up in the finals of the competition.
(WIN) The contestant did the best on their team in the week's Main Dish challenge or Skill Drill and was considered the winner.
(TIE) The contestant tied with another contestant as the best on their team in the week's Main Dish challenge or Skill Drill.
(BTM) The contestant was selected as one of the bottom entries in the Main Dish challenge, but was not eliminated.
(SWAP) The contestant get switched by a mentor to the other team.
(OUT) The contestant lost that week's Main Dish challenge and was out of the competition.
(WDR) The contestant withdrew from the competition.

== Episodes ==
No. overall	No. in season	Title	Original release date
83	1	"Can It Really Be This Bad?"	January 7, 2018
84	2	"Fish Are Food, Not Friends"	January 14, 2018
85	3	"Show Me the Vegetables!"	January 21, 2018
86	4	"Game Day!"	January 28, 2018
87	5	"Leftovers Again?"	February 4, 2018
88	6	"Sweets for My Sweetie"	February 11, 2018
89	7	"Sausage Party"	February 18, 2018
90	8	"Can You Please Pas-Ta Sauce?"	February 25, 2018
91	9	"Flair Flair Everywhere"	March 4, 2018
92	10	"The Final Countdown"	March 11, 2018
