= Worst Cooks in America season 15 =

Worst Cooks in America
- Season 15
- Judges: Anne Burrell; Tyler Florence
- No. of contestants: 15
- Winner: Allison Wolfe
- Winning mentor: Anne Burrell
- Runner-up: Brittany Carel
- No. of episodes: 9

Release
- Original network: Food Network
- Original release: January 6 – March 3, 2019

Season chronology
- ← Previous; Season 14 Next → Season 16

Worst Cooks in America 15 is the fifteenth season of the American competitive reality television series Worst Cooks in America. It premiered on Food Network on January 6, 2019 and concluded on March 3, 2019. Allison Wolfe was the winner of this season, with Brittany Carel as the runner-up.

== Format ==
Worst Cooks in America is an American reality television series in which contestants (referred to as "recruits") with poor cooking skills undergo a culinary boot camp for the chance to win $25,000 and a Food Network cooking set. The recruits are trained on the various basic cooking techniques including baking, knife skills, temperature, seasoning and preparation. Each episode features two core challenges: the Skills Drill, which tests their grasp of basic techniques demonstrated by the chef mentors, and the Main Dish Challenge, where they must apply those skills to recreate or invent a more complex dish under specific guidelines. The weakest performer is eliminated at the end of each episode. The final two contestants prepare a restaurant-quality, three-course meal for a panel of food critics, who evaluate the dishes based on taste, presentation, and overall improvement.

== Judges ==
Tyler Florence returns to Worst Cooks in America with Anne Burrell to host season 15.

== Recruits ==
Contestant	Age	Hometown	Occupation	Team	Status
Allison Wolfe	31	Richmond, Texas	Stay-at-home Mom	Anne	Winner on March 3, 2019
Brittany Carel	23	Fort Lauderdale, Florida	Model	Tyler	Runner-up on March 3, 2019
Travele Judon	32	Chicago, Illinois	Insurance Sales	Tyler	Eliminated on February 24, 2019
Brett Azar	31	Rahway, New Jersey	Arnold Schwarzenegger Body Double	Anne	Eliminated on February 24, 2019
Carmelle Bull	66	Atlanta, Georgia	Server	Anne	Eliminated on February 17, 2019
Mickey Wentz	50	Denver, Colorado	Math Teacher	Tyler	Eliminated on February 17, 2019
Katherine "Kat" Schuessler	27	Kent, Ohio	Fast Food Employee	Anne	Eliminated on February 3, 2019
Cameron Pennington	19	Grayson, Kentucky	Sandwich Artist	Tyler	Eliminated on February 3, 2019
Antoinette Wills	49	Washington D.C.	Secretary	Tyler	Eliminated on January 27, 2019
Terry Yu	52	Stockton, California	Prison Pharmacist	Anne	Eliminated on January 27, 2019
Alten Poblete	27	San Diego, California	Dog Walker	Tyler	Eliminated on January 20, 2019
Sponjetta Parrish	40	Athens, Georgia	Online Saleswoman	Anne	Eliminated on January 20, 2019
Cody Medler	24	Los Angeles, California	Service Car Driver	Tyler	Eliminated on January 13, 2019
Caitlin Rose	32	Brick, New Jersey	Salon Receptionist	Anne	Eliminated on January 13, 2019
Chaz Oakley	53	Ninilchik, Alaska	Artist	-	Eliminated on January 6, 2019

== Elimination Chart ==
Team Anne
Team Tyler

Rank	Contestant	Episode								
Rank	Contestant	1	2	3	4	5	6	7	8	9
1	Allison	IN	IN	BTM	IN	BTM	WIN	WIN	WIN	WINNER
2	Brittany	IN	IN	IN	IN	BTM	BTM	WIN	WIN	RUNNER-UP
3	Travele	IN	IN	IN	WIN	WIN	WIN	BTM	OUT	
4	Brett	IN	IN	WIN	IN	WIN	BTM	BTM	OUT	
5	Carmelle	WIN	IN	IN	WIN	IN	BTM	OUT		
6	Mickey	IN	IN	WIN	BTM	IN	BTM	OUT		
7	Kat	IN	BTM	IN	BTM	OUT				
8	Cameron	BTM	WIN	IN	IN	OUT				
9	Antoinette	WIN	IN	BTM	OUT					
10	Terry	IN	WIN	IN	OUT					
11	Alten	IN	BTM	OUT						
12	Sponjetta	BTM	IN	OUT						
13	Cody	BTM	OUT							
14	Caitlin	BTM	OUT							
15	Chaz	OUT								

Key
(WINNER) This contestant won the competition and was crowned "Best of the Worst".
(RUNNER-UP) The contestant was the runner-up in the finals of the competition.
(WIN) The contestant did the best on their team in the week's Main Dish challenge or Skill Drill and was considered the winner.
(BTM) The contestant was selected as one of the bottom entries in the Main Dish challenge, but was not eliminated.
(OUT) The contestant lost that week's Main Dish challenge and was out of the competition.

== Episodes ==
No. overall	No. in season	Title	Original release date
106	1	"The Perfect Bird"	January 6, 2019
107	2	"Eggtastic"	January 13, 2019
108	3	"Cowboy Cuisine"	January 20, 2019
109	4	"Meat Me at the Game"	January 27, 2019
110	5	"Spice Up Your Life"	February 3, 2019
111	6	"Carnival Chaos"	February 10, 2019
112	7	"Aloha, Recruits!"	February 17, 2019
113	8	"In It to Win It"	February 24, 2019
114	9	"The Day We've Been Waiting For"	March 3, 2019
