= Worst Cooks in America season 14 =

Worst Cooks in America
- Season 14
- Judges: Anne Burrell; Robert Irvine
- No. of contestants: 14
- Winner: Bradley Garcia
- Winning mentor: Robert Irvine
- Runner-up: Sarah Harris
- No. of episodes: 7

Release
- Original network: Food Network
- Original release: August 12 – September 24, 2018

Season chronology
- ← Previous; Season 13 Next → Season 15

Worst Cooks in America 14 is the fourteenth season of the American competitive reality television series Worst Cooks in America. It premiered on Food Network on August 12, 2018 and concluded on September 24, 2018. Bradley Garcia was the winner of this season, with Sarah Harris as the runner-up.

== Format ==
Worst Cooks in America is a reality television series where contestants with poor cooking skills, called “recruits,” undergo a culinary boot camp for the chance to win $25,000 and a Food Network cooking set. The recruits are trained in various basic cooking techniques including baking, knife skills, temperature control, seasoning and preparation. Each episode features two core challenges. The first is the Skills Drill, which tests their grasp of basic techniques demonstrated by the chef mentors. The second is the Main Dish Challenge, where they must apply those skills to recreate or invent a more complex dish under specific guidelines. The weakest performer is eliminated at the end of each episode. The final two contestants prepare a restaurant-quality, three-course meal for a panel of food critics, who evaluate the dishes based on taste, presentation, and overall improvement.

== Judges ==
Robert Irvine rejoined Anne Burrell to host season 14.

== Recruits ==
Contestant	Age	Hometown	Occupation	Team	Status
Bradley Garcia	22	Miami, Florida	Model	Robert	Winner on September 24, 2018
Sarah Harris	23	Porum, Oklahoma	Equine Therapist	Anne	Runner-up on September 24, 2018
Timmy Thok	29	New York City	Underwear Model, Bartender	Robert	Finalist on September 24, 2018
Janese Henry	30	Spring Lake, North Carolina	Stay-at-Home Mom	Anne	Finalist on September 24, 2018
Carla Waddell	46	Alexandria, Virginia	Human Resources	Anne	Eliminated on September 10, 2018
Frank Scuderi	40	Maple Shade, New Jersey	Operations Manager	Robert	Eliminated on September 10, 2018
Rudy Rehburg	30	Chicago, Illinois	Property Preservation Specialist	Anne	Eliminated on September 3, 2018
Jessica Paulson	26	Oakley, California	EMT	Robert	Eliminated on September 3, 2018
Kimberly D. Worthy (Note: Kimberly D. Worthy previously competed on the first season of Worst Bakers in America.)	33	Atlanta, Georgia	Writer	Robert	Eliminated on August 26, 2018
Copan Combs	30	Stillwater, Oklahoma	Academic Recruiter	Anne	Eliminated on August 26, 2018
Linda Martin	60	Somerville, Massachusetts	Retired	Anne	Eliminated on August 19, 2018
Marcus Ellis	51	Queens, New York	Mental Health Counselor	Robert	Eliminated on August 19, 2018
Maryann Rapisarda	67	Valdosta, Georgia	Retired	Robert	Eliminated on August 12, 2018
Robbie DeRaffele	30	Hackensack, New Jersey	Superman Impersonator	Anne	Eliminated on August 12, 2018

== Elimination Chart ==
Team Anne
Team Robert

Rank	Contestant	Episode						
Rank	Contestant	1	2	3	4	5	6	7
1	Bradley	IN	IN	WIN	WIN	WIN	IN	WINNER
2	Sarah	WIN	WIN	IN	BTM	WIN	IN	RUNNER-UP
3	Timmy	IN	WIN	BTM	IN	BTM	IN	FINALIST
4	Janese	IN	IN	BTM	WIN	BTM	IN	FINALIST
5	Carla	IN	IN	WIN	IN	OUT		
6	Frank	WIN	IN	IN	BTM	OUT		
7	Rudy	IN	BTM	IN	OUT			
8	Jessica	IN	IN	IN	OUT			
9	Kimberly	IN	BTM	OUT				
10	Copan	BTM	IN	OUT				
11	Linda	IN	OUT					
12	Marcus	BTM	OUT					
13	Maryann	OUT						
14	Robbie	OUT						

Key
(WINNER) This contestant won the competition and was crowned "Best of the Worst".
(RUNNER-UP) The contestant was the runner-up in the finals of the competition.
(FINALIST) The contestant was a finalist in the finals of the competition.
(WIN) The contestant did the best on their team in the week's Main Dish challenge or Skill Drill and was considered the winner.
(BTM) The contestant was selected as one of the bottom entries in the Main Dish challenge, but was not eliminated.
(OUT) The contestant lost that week's Main Dish challenge and was out of the competition.

== Episodes ==
No. overall	No. in season	Title	Original release date
99	1	"By Land and Sea"	August 12, 2018
100	2	"Hibachi Heroes"	August 19, 2018
101	3	"Winner Winner Chicken Dinner"	August 26, 2018
102	4	"The Ick Factor"	September 2, 2018
103	5	"Piece of Cake"	September 9, 2018
104	6	"Duck, Duck..."	September 16, 2018
105	7	"Finally the Finale"	September 23, 2018
