= Worst Cooks in America season 11 =

Worst Cooks in America
- Season 11
- Judges: Anne Burrell; Rachael Ray
- No. of contestants: 8
- Winner: Perez Hilton
- Winning mentor: Rachael Ray
- Runner-up: Melissa Peterman
- No. of episodes: 8

Release
- Original network: Food Network
- Original release: August 23 – October 11, 2017

Season chronology
- ← Previous; Season 10 Next → Season 12

Worst Cooks in America 11, also known as Celebrity Edition 3, is the eleventh season of the American competitive reality television series Worst Cooks in America. This is the third iteration of the celebrity editions. It premiered on Food Network on August 23, 2017 and concluded on October 11, 2017. Perez Hilton was the winner of this season, with Melissa Peterman as the runner-up.

== Format ==
Worst Cooks in America (Celebrity Edition) is an American reality television series in which celebrities (referred to as "recruits") with poor cooking skills undergo a culinary boot camp for the chance to win a $50,000 prize to donate to the charity of their choice. The recruits are trained on the various basic cooking techniques including baking, knife skills, temperature, seasoning and preparation. Each episode features two core challenges: the Skills Drill, which tests their grasp of basic techniques demonstrated by the chef mentors, and the Main Dish Challenge, where they must apply those skills to recreate or invent a more complex dish under specific guidelines. The weakest performer is eliminated at the end of each episode. The final two contestants prepare a restaurant-quality, three-course meal for a panel of food critics, who evaluate the dishes based on taste, presentation, and overall improvement.

== Judges ==
Rachael Ray returns with Anne Burrell to host season 3 of the Celebrity Edition. The season premiered on August 23, 2017.

== Recruits ==
Contestant	Age	Occupation	Team	Status
Perez Hilton	39	Gossip Blogger	Rachael	Winner on October 11, 2017
Melissa Peterman	46	Actress & Comedian	Anne	Runner-up on October 11, 2017
Nora Dunn	65	Actress & Comedian	Anne	Eliminated on October 4, 2017
Vivica A. Fox	53	Actress	Rachael	Eliminated on October 4, 2017
Sean Lowe	33	Reality Star	Rachael	Eliminated on September 27, 2017
Carmen Electra	45	Model & Actress	Rachael	Withdrew on September 13, 2017
Carson Kressley	47	TV Personality	Anne	Eliminated on September 6, 2017
Erik Estrada	68	Star of CHiPs	Anne	Eliminated on August 30, 2017

== Elimination Chart ==
Team Anne
Team Rachael

Rank	Contestant	Episode													
Rank	Contestant	1	2		3		4		5		6		7		8
1	Perez	WIN	IN	WIN	IN	IN	WIN	IN	IN	IN	WIN	IN	IN	WIN	WINNER
2	Melissa	WIN	WIN	IN	WIN	WIN	IN	BTM	WIN	BTM	IN	IN	IN	WIN	RUNNER-UP
3	Nora	BTM	WIN	IN	IN	IN	IN	IN	WIN	IN	IN	BTM	IN	OUT	
4	Vivica	IN	IN	IN	IN	WIN	WIN	BTM	IN	OUT			RTN	OUT	
5	Sean	IN	IN	IN	IN	BTM	WIN	IN	IN	IN	WIN	OUT			
6	Carmen	BTM	IN	BTM	WIN	IN	WDR								
7	Carson	IN	WIN	WIN	IN	OUT									
8	Erik	IN	WIN	OUT											

Key
(WINNER) This contestant won the competition and was crowned "Best of the Worst".
(RUNNER-UP) The contestant was the runner-up in the finals of the competition.
(WIN) The contestant did the best on their team in the week's Main Dish challenge or Skill Drill and was considered the winner.
(BTM) The contestant was selected as one of the bottom entries in the Main Dish challenge but was not eliminated
(RTN) The contestant won the redemption Skill Drill and returned to the competition.
(OUT) The contestant lost that week's Main Dish challenge and was out of the competition.
(WDR) The contestant withdrew from the competition due to illness or injury.

== Episodes ==
No. overall	No. in season	Title	Original release date
75	1	"Celebrity: Social Media Food Failures"	August 23, 2017
76	2	"Celebrity: Shabby to Chic"	August 30, 2017
77	3	"Celebrity: Staring from Scratch"	September 6, 2017
78	4	"Celebrity: Around the World in a Day"	September 13, 2017
79	5	"Celebrity: This Meal is Offal!"	September 20, 2017
80	6	"Celebrity: Get Baked"	September 27, 2017
81	7	"Celebrity: Tin Foil Chefs"	October 4, 2017
82	8	"Celebrity: Finale the End!"	October 11, 2017
