= Worst Cooks in America season 10 =

Worst Cooks in America
- Season 10
- Judges: Anne Burrell; Rachael Ray
- No. of contestants: 16
- Winner: Daniel Mar
- Winning mentor: Anne Burrell
- Runner-up: Ann Odogwu
- No. of episodes: 10

Release
- Original network: Food Network
- Original release: January 1 – March 5, 2017

Season chronology
- ← Previous; Season 9 Next → Season 11

Worst Cooks in America 10, is the tenth season of the American competitive reality television series Worst Cooks in America. It premiered on Food Network on January 1, 2017 and concluded on March 5, 2017. Daniel Mar was the winner of this season, with Ann Odogwu as the runner-up.

== Format ==
Worst Cooks in America is an American reality television series in which contestants (referred to as "recruits") with poor cooking skills undergo a culinary boot camp for the chance to win $25,000 and a Food Network cooking set. The recruits are trained on the various basic cooking techniques including baking, knife skills, temperature, seasoning and preparation. Each episode features two core challenges: the Skills Drill, which tests their grasp of basic techniques demonstrated by the chef mentors, and the Main Dish Challenge, where they must apply those skills to recreate or invent a more complex dish under specific guidelines. The weakest performer is eliminated at the end of each episode. The final two contestants prepare a restaurant-quality, three-course meal for a panel of food critics, who evaluate the dishes based on taste, presentation, and overall improvement.

== Judges ==
Rachael Ray returns with Anne Burrell to host season 10. The season premiered on January 1, 2017.

== Recruits ==
| Contestant | Age | Hometown | Occupation | Team | Status |
|---|---|---|---|---|---|
| Daniel Mar | 35 | Burbank, California | Photographer | Anne | Winner on March 5, 2017 |
| Ann Odogwu | 34 | Houston, Texas | Flight Attendant | Rachael | Runner-up on March 5, 2017 |
| Laura Docker | 36 | Fort Worth, Texas | Lawyer | Rachael | Eliminated on February 26, 2017 |
| Mandy Thornton | 24 | Hanover, Massachusetts | Medical Assistant | Anne | Eliminated on February 26, 2017 |
| Adam Cooke | 32 | Rancho Cucamonga, California | Auto Mechanic | Rachael | Eliminated on February 19, 2017 |
| Brittany Lenore | 27 | Chicago, Illinois | Spiritual Speaker | Anne | Eliminated on February 19, 2017 |
| Jeff West | 36 | Douglassville, Pennsylvania | Vending Machine President | Anne | Eliminated on February 12, 2017 |
| Kayla Kurtz | 27 | Kent, Ohio | Stay-at-Home Mom | Anne | Eliminated on January 29, 2017 |
| Maria Marcello | 40 | Torrance, California | Stay-at-Home Mom | Rachael | Eliminated on January 29, 2017 |
| Matt Josephs | 35 | Richmond, Virginia | Sports Radio Producer | Rachael | Eliminated on January 22, 2017 |
| Jake Michaels | 21 | Manteno, Illinois | Model & Singer | Rachael | Eliminated on January 15, 2017 |
| Jetta Linda Ostrofsky | 66 | Sacramento, California | Retired | Anne | Eliminated on January 15, 2017 |
| Stephen Hawkins | 67 | Temecula, California | Retired | Anne | Eliminated on January 8, 2017 |
| Buffy Mykkanen | 29 | Portland, Oregon | Tech Support | Rachael | Eliminated on January 8, 2017 |
| Cedrick Miller | 22 | El Paso, Texas | Cashier | Anne | Eliminated on January 1, 2017 |
| Lester Turchin | 65 | Fort Lauderdale, Florida | Retired | Rachael | Eliminated on January 1, 2017 |

== Elimination Chart ==
Team Anne
Team Rachael

| Rank | Contestant | Episode | | | | | | | | | | | | |
| Rank | Contestant | 1 | 2 | | 3 | 4 | 5 | 6 | | 7 | | 8 | 9 | 10 |
|---|---|---|---|---|---|---|---|---|---|---|---|---|---|---|
| 1 | Daniel | IN | IN | WIN | BTM | BTM | IN | IN | IN | WIN | IN | IN | WIN | WINNER |
| 2 | Ann | WIN | IN | IN | WIN | BTM | BTM | IN | BTM | IN | SAVE | IN | WIN | RUNNER-UP |
| 3 | Laura | IN | WIN | IN | IN | IN | WIN | BTM | BTM | WIN | WIN | IN | OUT | |
| 4 | Mandy | IN | IN | IN | TIE | IN | WIN | WIN | BTM | IN | BTM | IN | OUT | |
| 5 | Adam | IN | IN | BTM | BTM | IN | IN | IN | WIN | IN | IN | OUT | | |
| 6 | Brittany | WIN | IN | IN | TIE | WIN | IN | IN | BTM | IN | WIN | OUT | | |
| 7 | Jeff | IN | WIN | IN | IN | IN | BTM | IN | WIN | IN | OUT | | | |
| 8 | Kayla | IN | IN | IN | TIE | SAVE | OUT | | | | | | | |
| 9 | Maria | IN | IN | WIN | IN | WIN | OUT | | | | | | | |
| 10 | Matt | IN | IN | IN | IN | OUT | | | | | | | | |
| 11 | Jake | BTM | IN | IN | OUT | | | | | | | | | |
| 12 | Jetta | IN | IN | BTM | OUT | | | | | | | | | |
| 13 | Stephen | BTM | IN | OUT | | | | | | | | | | |
| 14 | Buffy | IN | IN | OUT | | | | | | | | | | |
| 15 | Cedrick | OUT | | | | | | | | | | | | |
| 16 | Lester | OUT | | | | | | | | | | | | |

Key
(WINNER) This contestant won the competition and was crowned "Best of the Worst".
(RUNNER-UP) The contestant was the runner-up in the finals of the competition.
(WIN) The contestant did the best on their team in the week's Main Dish challenge or Skill Drill and was considered the winner.
(TIE) The contestant tied with another contestant as the best on their team in the week's Main Dish challenge or Skill Drill.
(SAVE) The contestant lost that week's Main Dish challenge but was saved by their respective team mentor.
(BTM) The contestant was selected as one of the bottom entries in the Main Dish challenge, but was not eliminated.
(OUT) The contestant lost that week's Main Dish challenge and was out of the competition.

== Episodes ==
| No. overall | No. in season | Title | Original release date |
|---|---|---|---|
| 65 | 1 | "A Decade of Dish-asters" | January 1, 2017 |
| 66 | 2 | "Frozen Freak Out" | January 8, 2017 |
| 67 | 3 | "All Aboard!" | January 15, 2017 |
| 68 | 4 | "Fish Freak Out" | January 22, 2017 |
| 69 | 5 | "All Fun and Game Day" | January 29, 2017 |
| 70 | 6 | "The Proof Is in the Pudding" | February 5, 2017 |
| 71 | 7 | "Facing Your Fears" | February 12, 2017 |
| 72 | 8 | "Mardi Gras Mad" | February 19, 2017 |
| 73 | 9 | "The Reason You're Here" | February 26, 2017 |
| 74 | 10 | "A Fine Finale" | March 5, 2017 |
