= Worst Cooks in America season 5 =

Worst Cooks in America
- Season 5
- Judges: Anne Burrell; Bobby Flay
- No. of contestants: 14
- Winner: Amber Brauner
- Winning mentor: Bobby Flay
- Runner-up: Jamie Thomas
- No. of episodes: 7

Release
- Original network: Food Network
- Original release: February 17 – March 31, 2014

Season chronology
- ← Previous; Season 4 Next → Season 6

Worst Cooks in America 5 is the fifth season of the American competitive reality television series Worst Cooks in America. It premiered on Food Network on February 17, 2014 and concluded on March 31, 2014. Amber Brauner was the winner of this season, with Jamie Thomas as the runner-up.

== Format ==
Worst Cooks in America is an American reality television series in which contestants (referred to as "recruits") with poor cooking skills undergo a culinary boot camp for the chance to win $25,000 and a Food Network cooking set. The recruits are trained on the various basic cooking techniques including baking, knife skills, temperature, seasoning and preparation. Each episode features two core challenges: the Skills Drill, which tests their grasp of basic techniques demonstrated by the chef mentors, and the Main Dish Challenge, where they must apply those skills to recreate or invent a more complex dish under specific guidelines. The weakest performer is eliminated at the end of each episode. The final two contestants prepare a restaurant-quality, three-course meal for a panel of food critics, who evaluate the dishes based on taste, presentation, and overall improvement.

== Judges ==
Anne Burrell and Bobby Flay returned as Mentors for season 5.

== Recruits ==
Contestant	Age	Hometown	Occupation	Team	Status
Amber Brauner	37	Redlands, California	Tattoo Artist	Bobby	Winner on March 31, 2014
Jamie Thomas	41	New York City	Flight Attendant	Anne	Runner-up on March 31, 2014
Daniel "Danny" Beyda	43	Long Island, New York	Radiologist	Bobby	Eliminated on March 24, 2014
Mike Glazer	30	Chicago, Illinois	Writer	Anne	Eliminated on March 24, 2014
Carie Pullano-Keller	34	Chester, Virginia	Promotional Model	Anne	Eliminated on March 17, 2014
Stephanie St. Aubin	26	Washington, DC	Secretary	Bobby	Eliminated on March 17, 2014
Danielle Ruiz-Wiley	25	Staten Island, New York	Stay at Home Mom	Bobby	Eliminated on March 10, 2014
Carol Holder	64	New York City	Real Estate Broker	Anne	Eliminated on March 10, 2014
Ken Hsu	29	Seattle, Washington	Personal Trainer	Anne	Eliminated on March 3, 2014
Joe Slaughter	28	Los Angeles, California	Actor/Dancer	Bobby	Eliminated on March 3, 2014
Lance Green	31	New York City	Music Producer	Bobby	Eliminated on February 24, 2014
Benjamin "Benji" Hunter Brown III	29	Nashville, Tennessee	Live Music Booking Agent	Anne	Eliminated on February 24, 2014
Casey Pentony	26	Hollywood, California	Nurse	Anne	Eliminated on February 17, 2014
Muneerah Warner	33	Philadelphia, Pennsylvania	Abstinence Advisor	Bobby	Eliminated on February 17, 2014

== Elimination Chart ==
Team Anne
Team Bobby

* Initially a member of the other team

Rank	Contestant	Episode											
Rank	Contestant	1	2		3		4		5		6		7
1	Amber	WIN	IN	IN	IN	WIN	WIN	BTM	IN	WIN	IN	WIN	WINNER
2	Jamie	WIN	IN	WIN	BTM	IN	IN	WIN	WIN	WIN	WIN	WIN	RUNNER-UP
3	Danny	IN	IN	BTM	IN	IN	WIN	WIN	WIN	BTM	IN	OUT	
4	Mike	IN	IN	IN	WIN	WIN	IN	IN	IN	BTM	WIN	OUT	
5	Carie*	IN	IN	IN	SWAP	IN	IN	BTM	IN	OUT			
6	Stephanie*	IN	IN	BTM	SWAP	IN	WIN	IN	IN	OUT			
7	Danielle	IN	WIN	IN	IN	BTM	WIN	OUT					
8	Carol	IN	WIN	IN	BTM	BTM	IN	OUT					
9	Ken	IN	IN	IN	IN	OUT							
10	Joe	IN	IN	WIN	IN	OUT							
11	Lance	BTM	IN	OUT									
12	Benji	BTM	IN	OUT									
13	Casey	OUT											
14	Muneerah	OUT											

Key
(WINNER) This contestant won the competition and was crowned "Best of the Worst".
(RUNNER-UP) The contestant was the runner-up in the finals of the competition.
(WIN) The contestant did the best on their team in the week's Main Dish challenge and was considered the winner.
(BTM) The contestant was selected as one of the bottom entries in the Main Dish challenge but was not eliminated.
(OUT) The contestant lost that week's Main Dish challenge and was out of the competition.
(SWAP) The contestant get switched by a mentor to the other team.

== Episodes ==
No. overall	No. in season	Title	Original release date
30	1	"Worse Than Ever"	February 17, 2014
31	2	"Scratching the Surface"	February 24, 2014
32	3	"Glazed and Confused"	March 3, 2014
33	4	"Surprise!"	March 10, 2014
34	5	"Two-a-Day"	March 17, 2014
35	6	"Eat, Pray, Love"	March 24, 2014
36	7	"Timer's Up"	March 31, 2014
