= Worst Cooks in America season 6 =

Worst Cooks in America
- Season 6
- Judges: Anne Burrell; Tyler Florence
- No. of contestants: 14
- Winner: Kristen Redmond
- Winning mentor: Anne Burrell
- Runner-up: Genique Freeman
- No. of episodes: 7

Release
- Original network: Food Network
- Original release: January 4 – February 15, 2015

Season chronology
- ← Previous; Season 5 Next → Season 7

Worst Cooks in America 6, is the sixth season of the American competitive reality television series Worst Cooks in America. It premiered on Food Network on January 4, 2015 and concluded on February 15, 2015. Kristen Redmond was the winner of this season, with Genique Freeman as the runner-up.

== Format ==
Worst Cooks in America is an American reality television series in which contestants (referred to as "recruits") with poor cooking skills undergo a culinary boot camp for the chance to win $25,000 and a Food Network cooking set. The recruits are trained on the various basic cooking techniques including baking, knife skills, temperature, seasoning and preparation. Each episode features two core challenges: the Skills Drill, which tests their grasp of basic techniques demonstrated by the chef mentors, and the Main Dish Challenge, where they must apply those skills to recreate or invent a more complex dish under specific guidelines. The weakest performer is eliminated at the end of each episode. The final two contestants prepare a restaurant-quality, three-course meal for a panel of food critics, who evaluate the dishes based on taste, presentation, and overall improvement.

== Judges ==
Tyler Florence joined Anne Burrell to host season 6, replacing Bobby Flay after 3 seasons. The season premiered on January 4, 2015, to 2,123,000 viewers. The second episode was lower at 1,456,000 viewers, with the third episode rising to 1,732,000 viewers and the fourth episode reached 1,689,000 viewers. the 5th episode reached 1,634,000 viewers. The sixth episode received 1.55 million viewers.

== Recruits ==
| Contestant | Age | Hometown | Occupation | Team | Status |
|---|---|---|---|---|---|
| Kristen Redmond | 25 | Austin, Texas | Singer/Songwriter | Anne | Winner on February 15, 2015 |
| Genique Freeman | 33 | Fayetteville, North Carolina | Esthetician | Tyler | Runner-up on February 15, 2015 |
| Sarah Bettendorf | 33 | Los Angeles, California | Art Teacher | Tyler | Eliminated on February 8, 2015 |
| Leopold "Leo" Nunan | 36 | Rio de Janeiro, Brazil | Performance Artist | Anne | Eliminated on February 8, 2015 |
| Norman Wilson | 46 | Detroit, Michigan | Executive Protection | Anne | Eliminated on February 1, 2015 |
| Sharif Dean | 27 | Los Angeles, California | Personal Trainer | Tyler | Eliminated on February 1, 2015 |
| David Eric Rosenberg | 51 | Las Vegas, Nevada | Theatre Usher | Anne | Eliminated on January 25, 2015 |
| Kortni Montgomery | 25 | New Orleans, Louisiana | Customer Service Rep | Tyler | Eliminated on January 25, 2015 |
| Michael "Six" Muldoon | 25 | Queens, New York | Magician | Anne | Eliminated on January 18, 2015 |
| Mike Kennedy | 45 | Scottsdale, Arizona | Private Investigator | Tyler | Eliminated on January 18, 2015 |
| Susie Babin | 61 | Bush, Louisiana | Retired | Anne | Eliminated on January 11, 2015 |
| Stephanie Streisand | 25 | Los Angeles, California | Writer | Tyler | Withdrew on January 11, 2015 |
| Jason Dixon | 30 | Chicago, Illinois | Artist | Tyler | Eliminated on January 4, 2015 |
| Christina Oster | 38 | Zion, Illinois | Single Mom | Anne | Eliminated on January 4, 2015 |

== Elimination Chart ==
Team Anne
Team Tyler

| Rank | Contestant | Episode | | | | | | | | | | | |
| Rank | Contestant | 1 | 2 | | 3 | | 4 | | 5 | | 6 | | 7 |
|---|---|---|---|---|---|---|---|---|---|---|---|---|---|
| 1 | Kristen | IN | WIN | WIN | IN | IN | WIN | BTM | IN | WIN | WIN | WIN | WINNER |
| 2 | Genique | IN | IN | WIN | IN | IN | WIN | IN | IN | WIN | WIN | WIN | RUNNER-UP |
| 3 | Sarah | WIN | IN | IN | BTM | BTM | IN | WIN | WIN | BTM | WIN | OUT | |
| 4 | Leo | IN | IN | IN | IN | IN | IN | WIN | IN | BTM | WIN | OUT | |
| 5 | Norman | WIN | IN | IN | IN | BTM | IN | IN | WIN | OUT | | | |
| 6 | Sharif | IN | WIN | BTM | WIN | IN | IN | BTM | IN | OUT | | | |
| 7 | David | BTM | IN | BTM | IN | WIN | BTM | OUT | | | | | |
| 8 | Kortni | BTM | IN | BTM | BTM | WIN | BTM | OUT | | | | | |
| 9 | Six | IN | IN | IN | IN | OUT | | | | | | | |
| 10 | Mike | IN | BTM | IN | IN | OUT | | | | | | | |
| 11 | Susie | IN | BTM | OUT | | | | | | | | | |
| 12 | Stephanie | IN | IN | WDR | | | | | | | | | |
| 13 | Jason | OUT | | | | | | | | | | | |
| 14 | Christina | OUT | | | | | | | | | | | |

Key
(WINNER) This contestant won the competition and was crowned "Best of the Worst".
(RUNNER-UP) The contestant was the runner-up in the finals of the competition.
(WIN) The contestant did the best on their team in the week's Main Dish challenge or Skill Drill and was considered the winner.
(BTM) The contestant was selected as one of the bottom entries in the Main Dish challenge, but was not eliminated.
(OUT) The contestant lost that week's Main Dish challenge and was out of the competition.
(WDR) The contestant withdrew from the competition due to illness.

== Episodes ==
| No. overall | No. in season | Title | Original release date |
|---|---|---|---|
| 37 | 1 | "It Just Keeps Getting Worse" | January 4, 2015 |
| 38 | 2 | "Prepping for Success" | January 11, 2015 |
| 39 | 3 | "Spice Up Your Life" | January 18, 2015 |
| 40 | 4 | "Scared Straight Into the Kitchen" | January 25, 2015 |
| 41 | 5 | "Feeding Frenzy" | February 1, 2015 |
| 42 | 6 | "Blast from the Past" | February 8, 2015 |
| 43 | 7 | "Final Food Fight" | February 15, 2015 |
