= Worst Cooks in America season 4 =

Worst Cooks in America
- Season 4
- Judges: Anne Burrell; Bobby Flay
- No. of contestants: 14
- Winner: Alina Bolshakova
- Winning mentor: Bobby Flay
- Runner-up: Rasheeda Brown
- No. of episodes: 7

Release
- Original network: Food Network
- Original release: February 17 – March 31, 2013

Season chronology
- ← Previous; Season 3 Next → Season 5

Worst Cooks in America 4, is the fourth season of the American competitive reality television series Worst Cooks in America. It premiered on Food Network on February 17, 2013 and concluded on March 31, 2013. Alina Bolshakova was the winner of this season, with Rasheeda Brown as the runner-up.

== Format ==
Worst Cooks in America is an American reality television series in which contestants (referred to as "recruits") with poor cooking skills undergo a culinary boot camp for the chance to win $25,000 and a Food Network cooking set. The recruits are trained on the various basic cooking techniques including baking, knife skills, temperature, seasoning and preparation. Each episode features two core challenges: the Skills Drill, which tests their grasp of basic techniques demonstrated by the chef mentors, and the Main Dish Challenge, where they must apply those skills to recreate or invent a more complex dish under specific guidelines. The weakest performer is eliminated at the end of each episode. The final two contestants prepare a restaurant-quality, three-course meal for a panel of food critics, who evaluate the dishes based on taste, presentation, and overall improvement.

== Judges ==
Anne Burrell and Bobby Flay returned as Mentors for season 4.

== Recruits ==
Contestant	Age	Hometown	Occupation	Team	Status
Alina Bolshakova	28	Riga, Latvia	Caretaker/Actress	Bobby	Winner on March 31, 2013
Rasheeda Brown	30	Germantown, Maryland	Correctional Officer	Anne	Runner-up on March 31, 2013
Chet Pourciau	40	New Orleans, Louisiana	Interior designer	Bobby	Eliminated on March 24, 2013
Suzanne "Sue" Mangogna	42	Northport, New York	Salon manager	Anne	Eliminated on March 24, 2013
Carla Johnson	47	Long Beach, California	Alcohol & Drug Counselor	Bobby	Eliminated on March 17, 2013
Michael Haydin	25	Rye Brook, New York	Accountant	Anne	Eliminated on March 17, 2013
Carrie Lee Riggins	32	Carmel, New York	Ballerina/Actress	Bobby	Eliminated on March 10, 2013
Crystal Lonneberg	30	Weehawken, New Jersey	Actress/Artist	Anne	Eliminated on March 10, 2013
Aadip Desai	36	Sacramento, California	Writer/Musician	Anne	Eliminated on March 3, 2013
Alex Stein	26	Dallas, Texas	Bail Bondsman	Bobby	Eliminated on March 3, 2013
Michael "Big Mike" Paul	24	Thomson, Georgia	Woodworker	Bobby	Eliminated on February 24, 2013
Robert "Dr. Bob" Schaefer	58	Pleasant Hill, California	Chiropractor	Anne	Eliminated on February 24, 2013
Tim Burger	42	Novi, Michigan	Former Marine	Bobby	Eliminated on February 17, 2013
Diana De Rosa	62	Huntington, New York	Photographer	Anne	Eliminated on February 17, 2013

== Elimination Chart ==
Team Anne
Team Bobby

Rank	Contestant	Episode											
Rank	Contestant	1	2		3		4		5		6		7
1	Alina	BTM	WIN	WIN	IN	IN	IN	WIN	WIN	WIN	IN	WIN	WINNER
2	Rasheeda	IN	IN	BTM	IN	IN	WIN	WIN	WIN	BTM	WIN	WIN	RUNNER-UP
3	Chet	WIN	IN	IN	IN	WIN	WIN	IN	WIN	BTM	IN	OUT	
4	Sue	IN	IN	WIN	BTM	BTM	IN	BTM	IN	WIN	WIN	OUT	
5	Carla	IN	IN	BTM	WIN	IN	BTM	BTM	WIN	OUT			
6	Michael	WIN	IN	IN	BTM	WIN	IN	BTM	IN	OUT			
7	Carrie Lee	IN	IN	IN	IN	BTM	IN	OUT					
8	Crystal	IN	WIN	IN	IN	IN	BTM	OUT					
9	Aadip	IN	IN	IN	IN	OUT							
10	Alex	IN	IN	IN	IN	OUT							
11	Mike	IN	BTM	OUT									
12	Bob	BTM	BTM	OUT									
13	Tim	OUT											
14	Diana	OUT											

Key
(WINNER) This contestant won the competition and was crowned "Best of the Worst".
(RUNNER-UP) The contestant was the runner-up in the finals of the competition.
(WIN) The contestant did the best on their team in the week's Main Dish challenge and was considered the winner.
(BTM) The contestant was selected as one of the bottom entries in the Main Dish challenge, but was not eliminated.
(OUT) The contestant lost that week's Main Dish challenge and was out of the competition.

== Episodes ==
No. overall	No. in season	Title	Original release date
23	1	"The Worst of the Worst"	February 17, 2013
24	2	"Straight Edge Skills"	February 24, 2013
25	3	"Fire and Ice"	March 3, 2013
26	4	"Do It Yourself Cooking"	March 10, 2013
27	5	"Face Your Fears of Feeding Others"	March 17, 2013
28	6	"Revisit Your Past Before the Last"	March 24, 2013
29	7	"So Close I Can Almost Taste It"	March 31, 2013
