= Worst Cooks in America season 2 =

Worst Cooks in America
- Season 2
- Judges: Anne Burrell; Robert Irvine
- No. of contestants: 16
- Winner: Joshua "Joshie" Berger
- Winning mentor: Anne Burrell
- Runner-up: Georgann "Georg" Coleman
- No. of episodes: 8

Release
- Original network: Food Network
- Original release: January 2 – February 20, 2011

Season chronology
- ← Previous; Season 1 Next → Season 3

Worst Cooks in America 2, is the second season of the American competitive reality television series Worst Cooks in America. It premiered on Food Network on January 2, 2011 and concluded on February 20, 2011. Joshie Bergerwas the winner of this season, with Georg Coleman as the runner-up.

== Format ==
Worst Cooks in America is an American reality television series in which contestants (referred to as "recruits") with poor cooking skills undergo a culinary boot camp for the chance to win $25,000 and a Food Network cooking set. The recruits are trained on the various basic cooking techniques including baking, knife skills, temperature, seasoning and preparation. Each episode features two core challenges: the Skills Drill, which tests their grasp of basic techniques demonstrated by the chef mentors, and the Main Dish Challenge, where they must apply those skills to recreate or invent a more complex dish under specific guidelines. The weakest performer is eliminated at the end of each episode. The final two contestants prepare a restaurant-quality, three-course meal for a panel of food critics, who evaluate the dishes based on taste, presentation, and overall improvement.

== Judges ==
Casting for season 2 of Worst Cooks in America was held at the LA Marriott Burbank Airport, Hotel & Convention Center on March 27, 2010. The Food Network also began accepting online video applications for season 2. Food Network's website announced that Robert Irvine would replace Beau MacMillan for season 2. Season 2 debuted on January 2, 2011. In this season the chefs had eight recruits each. From this season onward, the culinary experts in the finale were told beforehand that the food would be made by the home cooks.

== Recruits ==
Contestant	Age	Hometown	Occupation	Team	Status
Joshua "Joshie" Berger	36	Brooklyn, New York	Attorney	Anne	Winner on February 20, 2011
Georgann "Georg" Coleman	38	Chicago, Illinois	Speech pathologist	Robert	Runner-up on February 20, 2011
Carlos Manuel	28	Atlanta, Georgia	Banker	Anne	Eliminated on February 13, 2011
Kelsey Milos	22	Kings, Illinois	Hair stylist	Robert	Eliminated on February 13, 2011
Kat Rose	37	Newnan, Georgia	Stay-at-home mother	Anne	Eliminated on February 6, 2011
Tyrone "Ty" Miller	33	Trenton, New Jersey	Property manager	Robert	Eliminated on February 6, 2011
Jennifer "Jen" MacLean	43	Sparta, New Jersey	Operating room nurse	Anne	Eliminated on January 30, 2011
Kelly Gray	32	New York City	Aerobics instructor	Robert	Eliminated on January 30, 2011
Erika Rumsey	27	Elgin, Illinois	Account manager	Anne	Eliminated on January 23, 2011
Anna Altomari	44	Aliso Viejo, California	RN Case manager	Robert	Eliminated on January 23, 2011
Priscilla Harden	60	Sugar Land, Texas	Retired teacher	Anne	Eliminated on January 16, 2011
Matt Crespi	24	Philadelphia, Pennsylvania	PhD Student	Robert	Eliminated on January 16, 2011
Anthony Scinto	32	Crestwood, Illinois	Mechanical engineer	Anne	Eliminated on January 9, 2011
Jeff Longcor	25	Somerville, Massachusetts	Environmental contractor	Robert	Eliminated on January 9, 2011
Lina Yu	28	Arcadia, California	Production manager	Anne	Eliminated on January 2, 2011
Eric Ricupero	34	Quincy, Massachusetts	Bar owner	Robert	Eliminated on January 2, 2011

== Elimination Chart ==
Team Anne
Team Robert

* Initially a member of the other team

Rank	Episode												
Rank	Contestant	1	2		3		4		5	6	7		8
1	Joshie	IN	IN	IN	WIN	WIN	IN	IN	IN	BTM	IN	WIN	WINNER
2	Georg	IN	WIN	IN	IN	IN	WIN	IN	WIN	BTM	WIN	WIN	RUNNER-UP
3	Carlos	IN	IN	WIN	WIN	IN	IN	WIN	WIN	WIN	WIN	OUT	
4	Kelsey*	WIN	IN	IN	WIN	BTM	SWAP	BTM	IN	WIN	IN	OUT	
5	Kat*	WIN	IN	BTM	IN	IN	SWAP	BTM	BTM	OUT			
6	Ty	IN	IN	IN	IN	BTM	IN	IN	BTM	OUT			
7	Jen	IN	BTM	IN	WIN	IN	IN	IN	OUT				
8	Kelly	IN	IN	IN	IN	IN	IN	WIN	OUT				
9	Erika	BTM	WIN	IN	WIN	IN	IN	OUT					
10	Anna	IN	IN	IN	IN	WIN	IN	OUT					
11	Priscilla	IN	IN	BTM	WIN	OUT							
12	Matt	BTM	IN	WIN	IN	OUT							
13	Anthony	IN	IN	OUT									
14	Jeff	IN	BTM	OUT									
15	Lina	OUT											
16	Eric	OUT											

Key
(WINNER) This contestant won the competition and was crowned "Best of the Worst".
(RUNNER-UP) The contestant was the runner-up in the finals of the competition.
(WIN) The contestant did the best on their team in the week's Main Dish challenge and was considered the winner.
(BTM) The contestant was selected as one of the bottom entries in the Main Dish challenge, but was not eliminated.
(SWAP) The contestant get switched by a mentor to the other team
(OUT) The contestant lost that week's Main Dish challenge and was out of the competition.

== Episodes ==
No. overall	No. in season	Title	Original release date
7	1	"Worst Food Forward"	January 2, 2011
Main Dish Challenge Winners: Kelsey Milos and Kat Rose; Bottom Contestants: Matt Crespi and Erika Rumsey; Eliminated: Eric Ricupero and Lina Yu
8	2	"Farmageddon"	January 9, 2011
Main Dish Challenge Winners: Georg Coleman and Erika Rumsey; Bottom Contestants: Jeff Longcor and Jen MacLean; Main Dish Challenge Winner: Matt Crespi and Carlos Manuel; Bottom Contestants: Priscilla Harden and Kat Rose; Eliminated: Jeff Longcor and Anthony Scinto
9	3	"Frozen to Fabulous"	January 16, 2011
Main Dish Challenge Winners: Joshie Berger, Priscilla Harden, Jen MacLean, Carlos Manuel, Kelsey Milos and Erika Rumsey; Main Dish Challenge Winner: Anna Altomari and Joshie Berger; Bottom Contestants: Ty Miller and Kelsey Milos; Eliminated: Matt Crespi and Priscilla Harden
10	4	"Grill Skills"	January 23, 2011
Main Dish Challenge Winner: Georg Coleman; Bottom Contestant: Kat Rose; Swapped Contestants Kelsey Milos and Kat Rose; Main Dish Challenge Winner: Kelly Gray and Carlos Manuel; Bottom Contestants: Kelsey Milos and Kat Rose; Eliminated: Anna Altomari and Erika Rumsey
11	5	"Game Day Party"	January 30, 2011
Main Dish Challenge Winners: Georg Coleman and Carlos Manuel; Bottom Contestants: Ty Miller and Kat Rose; Eliminated: Kelly Gray and Jen MacLean
12	6	"Facing Food Fears"	February 6, 2011
Main Dish Challenge Winner: Carlos Manuel and Kelsey Milos; Bottom Contestants: Joshie Berger and Georg Coleman; Eliminated: Ty Miller and Kat Rose
13	7	"Sweet Surprise"	February 13, 2011
Main Dish Challenge Winners: Georg Coleman and Carlos Manuel; Main Dish Challenge Winners: Joshie Berger and Georg Coleman; Eliminated: Carlos Manuel and Kelsey Milos
14	8	"Worst to First"	February 20, 2011
Winner: Joshie Berger; Runner-Up: Georg Coleman
