= Worst Cooks in America season 1 =

Worst Cooks in America
- Season 1
- Judges: Anne Burrell; Beau MacMillan
- No. of contestants: 12
- Winner: Rachel Coleman
- Winning mentor: Anne Burrell
- Runner-up: Jennifer "Jenny" Cross
- No. of episodes: 6

Release
- Original network: Food Network
- Original release: January 3 – February 1, 2010

Season chronology
- ← Previous - Next → Season 2

Worst Cooks in America 1, is the first season of the American competitive reality television series Worst Cooks in America. It premiered on Food Network on January 3, 2010, and concluded on February 1, 2010. Rachel Coleman was the winner of this inaugural season, with Jennifer "Jenny" Cross as the runner-up.

== Format ==
Worst Cooks in America is an American reality television series in which contestants (referred to as "recruits") with poor cooking skills undergo a culinary boot camp for the chance to win $25,000 and a Food Network cooking set. The recruits are trained on the various basic cooking techniques including baking, knife skills, temperature, seasoning and preparation. Each episode features two core challenges: the Skills Drill, which tests their grasp of basic techniques demonstrated by the chef mentors, and the Main Dish Challenge, where they must apply those skills to recreate or invent a more complex dish under specific guidelines. The weakest performer is eliminated at the end of each episode. The final two contestants prepare a restaurant-quality, three-course meal for a panel of food critics, who evaluate the dishes based on taste, presentation, and overall improvement.

== Judges ==
Chefs Beau MacMillan and Anne Burrell lead an intense culinary boot camp. They have six recruits each, and every week they must eliminate one recruit from each of their teams until there is only one from each team left. The final two create a three-course meal to fool a panel of restaurant critics into believing that the meal was created by the acclaimed chefs.

== Recruits ==
Twelve chefs competed in the first season of Worst Cooks in America. Hometowns and occupations are available from the Food Network website. Chef Anne's team was known as the Red Team and Chef Beau's team was known as the Blue Team.

Contestant	Age	Hometown	Occupation	Team	Status
Rachel Coleman	23	Brooklyn, New York	Marketing Website editor	Anne	Winner on February 1, 2010
Jennifer "Jenny" Cross	21	Philadelphia, Pennsylvania	Waitress	Beau	Runner-up on February 1, 2010
Jennifer "Jen" Vecchio	38	Cumberland, Rhode Island	Dance Studio Owner	Beau	Eliminated on January 31, 2010
Eddie Chang	32	Jersey City, New Jersey	IT project manager	Anne	Eliminated on January 31, 2010
Marque Hernandez	41	Brea, California	Director of Clinical Operations	Beau	Eliminated on January 24, 2010
Rebecca Hooper	43	Sandy, Utah	Salon Owner	Anne	Eliminated on January 24, 2010
Sophia Gettys	27	Aurora, Colorado	Stay-at-home Mom	Anne	Eliminated on January 17, 2010
Susie Shoman	53	Georgetown, South Carolina	Grants administrator and entrepreneur	Beau	Eliminated on January 17, 2010
Kelly Johnson	31	Scottsdale, Arizona	Corporate litigation attorney	Anne	Eliminated on January 10, 2010
David Summey	29	Charlotte, North Carolina	Salesman	Beau	Eliminated on January 10, 2010
Wilhelmina Josephine	29	Aliso Viejo, California	Insurance claims adjuster	Beau	Eliminated on January 3, 2010
Hamed Hamad	27	North Hollywood, California	Journalist and fashion consultant	Anne	Eliminated on January 3, 2010

== Elimination Chart ==
Team Anne
Team Beau

* Initially a member of the other team

Rank	Contestant	Episode							
Rank	Contestant	1	2	3		4		5	6
1	Rachel	IN	IN	IN	IN	WIN	BTM	WIN	WINNER
2	Jenny*	IN	IN	SWAP	WIN	IN	BTM	WIN	RUNNER-UP
3	Jen	IN	IN	WIN	IN	WIN	WIN	OUT	
4	Eddie	BTM	WIN	BTM	BTM	IN	WIN	OUT	
5	Marque	WIN	WIN	BTM	BTM	IN	OUT		
6	Rebecca	WIN	BTM	IN	WIN	IN	OUT		
7	Sophia*	IN	IN	SWAP	OUT				
8	Susie	IN	BTM	IN	OUT				
9	Kelly	IN	OUT						
10	David	BTM	OUT						
11	Wilhelmina	OUT							
12	Hamed	OUT							

Key
(WINNER) This contestant won the competition and was crowned "Best of the Worst".
(RUNNER-UP) The contestant was the runner-up in the finals of the competition.
(WIN) The contestant did the best on their team in the week's Main Dish challenge and was considered the winner.
(BTM) The contestant was selected as one of the bottom entries in the Main Dish challenge, but was not eliminated.
(SWAP) The contestant get switched by a mentor to the other team
(OUT) The contestant lost that week's Main Dish challenge and was out of the competition.

== Episodes ==
No. overall	No. in season	Title	Original release date
1	1	"Into the Fire"	January 3, 2010
Main Dish Challenge Winners: Marque Hernandez and Rebecca Hooper; Bottom Contestants: Eddie Chang and David Summey; Eliminated: Hamed Hamad and Wilhelmina Josephine
2	2	"Looking Good"	January 10, 2010
Main Dish Challenge Winners: Eddie Chang and Marque Hernandez; Bottom Contestants: Rebecca Hooper and Susie Shoman; Eliminated: Kelly Johnson and David Summey
3	3	"Feelin' the Flavor"	January 17, 2010
Main Dish Challenge Winner: Jen Vecchio; Bottom Contestants: Eddie Chang and Marque Hernandez; Swapped Contestants Jenny Cross and Sophia Gettys; Main Dish Challenge Winner: Jenny Cross and Rebecca Hooper; Bottom Contestants: Eddie Chang and Marque Hernandez; Eliminated: Sophia Gettys and Susie Shoman
4	4	"Multitasking"	January 24, 2010
Main Dish Challenge Winner: Rachel Coleman and Jen Vecchio; Main Dish Challenge Winner: Eddie Chang and Jen Vecchio; Bottom Contestants: Rachel Coleman and Jenny Cross; Eliminated: Marque Hernandez and Rebecca Hooper
5	5	"Are You Ready"	January 31, 2010
Main Dish Challenge Winners: Rachel Coleman and Jenny Cross; Eliminated: Eddie Chang and Jen Vecchio
6	6	"Final Test"	February 1, 2010
Winner: Rachel Coleman; Runner-Up: Jenny Cross
