= Beat the Chefs =

American television series

- Genre: Game show
- Directed by: Tony Croll
- Presented by: Matt Rogers
- Starring: Beau MacMillan; Antonia Lofaso; Jeff Henderson
- Judges: Christy Jordan; Brad A. Johnson
- Country of origin: United States
- Original language: English
- No. of seasons: 1
- No. of episodes: 8

Production
- Executive producers: Tom Forman; Brian A. Veskosky; Brad Bishop
- Producers: Jay Barbieri; Gary Green; Christianna Reinhardt
- Production location: Radford Studio Center
- Editors: Phillip Lefesi; Manuel Reveles; Barry Boyle; Jamil Nelson; John Babinec; Stacie Dekker; Frank Longo; Chris Meyer
- Running time: 42–44 minutes
- Production company: RelativityREAL

Original release
- Network: Game Show Network
- Release: August 23 – November 26, 2012

Beat the Chefs is an American television cooking game show broadcast by Game Show Network (GSN) and hosted by Matt Rogers.

The series features contestants preparing a home-cooked family recipe, while professional chefs Beau MacMillan, Antonia Lofaso and Jeff Henderson make the same recipe in an upscale restaurant version. The two dishes are then judged by a panel of food critics who are Christy Jordan and Brad A Johnson. The series premiered on August 23, 2012, and aired its last episode on November 26, 2012.

== Format ==
The series features two families, one in each half-hour of the episode, preparing their family recipe while the professional chefs cook a restaurant version of the same meal. The family begins by revealing the dish they have selected to cook to the chefs as well as how longer they think it will take to prepare it. The chefs are then given the same amount of time to create their own version. Once the first cook-off is complete, the second family is brought out, and the procedure is repeated with their own meal. After the second cook-off, the judges reveal the winning dish from each round. If the family's home cooked meal beats the chefs' professional version, the family wins $25,000, if the chefs win, the family receives $1,000 worth of kitchen supplies.

== Production ==
Production company RelativityREAL had pitched the series to CBS as early as March 2010; however, it was not until two years later that Beat the Chefs first appeared at an upfront presentation from Game Show Network (GSN) in New York City as an original green-lit series on March 21, 2012. GSN later put out a one-month casting call from May 25, 2012 to June 25, 2012, looking for "great cooks" who had never been "formally trained.” On July 2, 2012, GSN announced the series' premiere date as August 23, 2012, right after the premiere of The American Bible Challenge. GSN then released the cast for the series on July 24, 2012, announcing former American Idol contestant Matt Rogers as the host of the show. The press release also revealed Beau MacMillan, Antonia Lofaso and Jeff Henderson as the professional chefs, as well as Brad A. Johnson and Christy Jordan as judges. In addition, Johnson and Jordan were joined by a guest judge each episode; these judges included Eric Roberts, Julie Powell, Richie Palmer, and Melissa Rycroft. The show was taped at Raleigh Studios in Manhattan Beach, California.

The series premiered on August 23, 2012, immediately following the premiere of The American Bible Challenge. GSN continued to air one new episode a week until November 26, 2012. The show was not seen on GSN after its fourth episode and was canceled in October 2012.

== Reception ==
Beat the Chefs earned mixed reception from critics. Carrie Grosvenor of About Entertainment argued that Rogers was a good fit for the show as host and called the show "enjoyable," but also claimed that there wasn't "enough of a focus on the food and preparation." Meanwhile, Hollywood Junket praised the series, calling it a "guaranteed winning show" while arguing that it had the potential to become "extremely successful."

The series earned relatively average ratings for GSN's standards. Despite The American Bible Challenge debuting to record ratings for GSN, Beat the Chefs maintained less than a third of the viewers that tuned in to its lead-in. The series premiere averaged 521,000 viewers, compared to the 1.73 million viewers who watched The American Bible Challenge. The following week, Beat the Chefs dropped to 357,000 viewers, while its lead-out, a sneak peek of GSN's upcoming revival of Pyramid, earned 443,000 viewers.
