= The American Bible Challenge =

American television game show (2012–2014)

- Genre: Game show
- Directed by: Michael A. Simon (Seasons 1-2); Brian Campbell (Season 3)
- Presented by: Jeff Foxworthy
- Starring: Kirk Franklin
- Theme music composer: Kristopher Pooley
- Country of origin: United States
- Original language: English
- No. of seasons: 3
- No. of episodes: 27

Production
- Executive producers: Tom Forman; Brad Bishop; Barry Poznick; Michael Davies; Maura Dunbar; Nick Stuart; Jennifer Novak; JP Williams; Janelle Fiorito
- Producers: Danielle Henderson; Jessie Binkow; Andrew Scott
- Production location: Red Studios Hollywood
- Editors: Eric Johannsen; Myron Santos; Jamiel Nelson; Paul Heiman; Mary C. Matthews
- Running time: 42–44 minutes
- Production companies: Relativity Television; Embassy Row; Sony Pictures Television

Original release
- Network: Game Show Network
- Release: August 23, 2012 – July 17, 2014

The American Bible Challenge is an American biblical-themed television game show created by Game Show Network. It was hosted by comedian Jeff Foxworthy, with gospel musician Kirk Franklin joining Foxworthy as co-host and announcer in the second season. The series debuted on August 23, 2012, and ran for three seasons.

Each season of the series is played as a nine-episode tournament with six episodes of opening rounds, two semi-finals, and a final. Each opening round starts with three teams of three contestants answering questions about the Bible. The teams then nominate their strongest contestants to answer questions by themselves without any assistance from their teammates. After this part of the round, the third-placed team is eliminated and the two highest-scoring teams compete in a final round with the scores being reset to zero. The remaining teams answer as many questions correctly as possible within one minute, and the highest-scoring team from this round wins a $20,000 prize which is given to the team's nominated charity. The winning team then advances to a semi-final game against two other winning teams, the winning team from this game advances to a final game where the grand prize is raised to $100,000. Thus, the team that wins the season-long tournament earns a total of $140,000 for their charity.

The show became the highest-rated original program in the history of the Game Show Network. In 2014, The American Bible Challenge received two nominations at the 41st Daytime Emmy Awards: one for the series as Outstanding Game Show and the other for Foxworthy as Outstanding Game Show Host, they lost to Jeopardy! and Steve Harvey (host of Family Feud) respectively.

== Gameplay ==
=== Main game ===
To begin the game, a category is revealed and the three teams of three contestants are asked multiple-choice questions under that category, with each question having four possible answers. The contestant who "buzzes in" (sounds the buzzer indicating he or she is ready to answer) with the correct answer earns the respective team 10 points, an incorrect answer loses 10 points and opens up the question to the other teams. Contestants must wait until the host finishes the entire question (including the choices) to buzz in.

Each team then participates in a physical stunt that involves teams using common household items to answer questions about biblical figures. For example, in the game Stick a Fork In It, the teams must answer the question by using a spoon to catapult a fork into one of several glasses labeled with different possible answers. Where teams compete individually, each team is given 60 seconds, occasional games where teams compete at the same time are either untimed (with the first team to complete the game winning) or played in 90 seconds. In all cases, the team that wins the stunt receives 20 points, in case of a tie, each of the teams involved in the tie receives the points. The next round, titled Kirk's Righteous Remix, features Grammy Award–winner Kirk Franklin and the show's choir singing songs relating to various books of the Bible. Each team is then given one question based on an announced subject worth 30 points, and no penalty is assessed for an incorrect answer.

The teams then set their strongest respective contestants aside for the final round of main gameplay. These contestants move to an area behind the teams, and cannot participate in this round. The host then asks each team, in turn, a question based on an announced category. Each question in this round is worth 50 points, with no penalty assessed for an incorrect answer. Only the two contestants standing at the podium may confer and answer the question. Two questions are asked to each team in this round. In the final round titled "The Chosen Three", the contestants who were set aside from the previous round stand alone at their podiums, with their teammates standing in the area behind them. The host asks each contestant, in turn, a question with six possible answers, three of which are correct. The contestants then make three selections without conferring with the rest of their respective teams. Each individual correct answer is worth 100 points, thus, a total of 300 points are available to each team in this round. The two teams with the highest total scores advance to the final round, while the third-place team is eliminated and leaves with $2,500 for their charity.

=== The Final Revelation ===
Before the final round of regular gameplay, titled The Final Revelation, both teams' scores from the main game are discarded. The host announces the category for the round and gives each team a copy of the Bible. The teams then move to a backstage area, and are permitted up to ten minutes to study the Bible for information based on that category. In season two, while backstage, the teams also have the option to use the YouVersion mobile app of the Bible on an electronic tablet along with their physical copy of the Bible.

After ten minutes, the first team comes on stage, while the second team is placed in a soundproof booth. The host then asks the team questions from the announced category. Each question is given, in rotation, to one player, who cannot confer with teammates. Both teams play the same set of questions. Each team has a total of 60 seconds to answer as many questions as possible, and the team that answers more questions correctly wins $20,000 for their charity, while the runners-up win $5,000 for their charity. Teams that win this round advance to a semi-final game, the winners of that episode advance to the season finale, where the team that wins this round wins $100,000 for their charity as well as all winnings from previous episodes.

=== Previous rules ===
Immediately following the first round in season two, each team had a chance to earn 25 additional points. Before the show, a question was asked to 100 YouVersion users (e.g. "Would you rather fast for 40 days or eat manna for 40 years?"). A question with three possible choices was then asked about the percentage of people who answered (e.g. "What percentage said they would rather fast for 40 days than eat manna for 40 years?"). During the break, each team wrote their answer on a tablet computer, and each team that submitted the correct answer earned 25 points. This round was removed from the game in the third season and replaced with another opening round-style game played for ±10 points a question.

Following the second round in season one, teams had to choose the apocryphal verse from three true Bible verses. Since the scoring was disappointingly low, this round was eliminated in later shows.

== Production ==
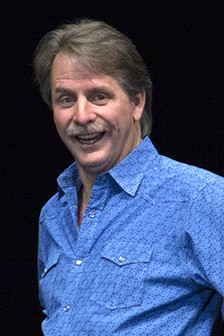
Jeff Foxworthy hosted all three seasons of the series.

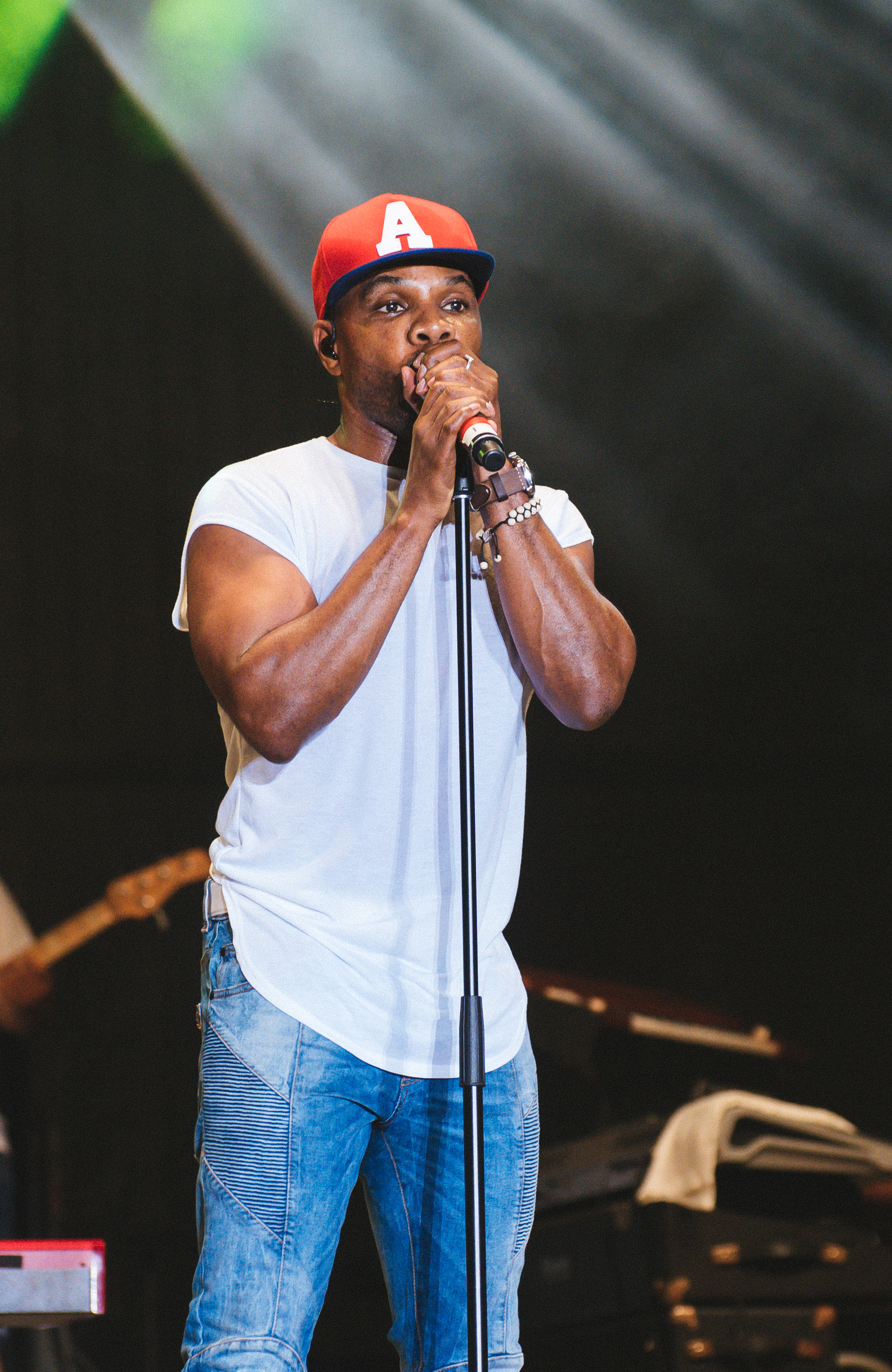
Kirk Franklin at JoyFest '17

The series began development with production staff approaching Troy Schmidt, a pastor at First Baptist Church in Windermere, Florida, to work as both a writer and a consultant for the show. One of Schmidt's initial roles was to be an "on-camera Bible expert" for the series, one of many aspects of the pilot episode that a test audience rejected, and one with which Schmidt himself later admitted he was not comfortable. In response to the early criticism from the test audience, Game Show Network (GSN) took a six-week period to bring in several new staff members and make various changes to the show's format.

After these changes were made, the test audience became more appreciative of the series, and GSN announced its development to the public at an upfront presentation in New York City on March 21, 2012, for the network's upcoming programming. By this time, a pilot episode had already been shot; which was hosted by American stand-up comedian and television personality Jeff Foxworthy. When first asked if he was interested in hosting the show, Foxworthy was hesitant; he agreed to take on the role after learning that contestants would be playing for charity rather than on their own behalf. Casting for the series was held in various cities from May to June 2012. On July 7, 2012, GSN confirmed the show would premiere on August 23, 2012, alongside the premiere of Beat the Chefs.

=== Season one ===
The first season of The American Bible Challenge premiered its first of nine episodes on August 23, 2012. An audience of 1.73 million viewers watched the debut episode, making it GSN's highest-rated original program in its history. In total, when combined with a rerun of the episode later that evening, the show brought in over 2.3 million viewers (1.730 million at 8:00 p.m., 571,000 at 11:00 p.m.) for the night. On October 18, 2012, Team Judson's Legacy, consisting of married couple Drake and Christina Levasheff of Irvine, California and their friend Dean Bobar, were crowned champions of the inaugural season's tournament, winning a total of $140,000 for Hunter's Hope, a leukodystrophy charity, chosen in honor of the Levasheffs' son, Judson, who had died in 2007 of late-onset Krabbe disease. By the end of the first season, the series had become GSN's most successful original program ever, garnering a total of over 13 million total viewers.

=== Season two ===
A second nine-episode season of the series was announced on October 9, 2012. GSN advertised that auditions would be held nationwide in November and December, and that the season would also feature the addition of Franklin to the series. The second season premiered on GSN March 21, 2013, debuting to 1.152 million viewers. On May 23, 2013, Team Wagner Warriors, consisting of brothers Joshua, Jesse, and Daniel Wagner from Owasso and Tulsa, Oklahoma, were crowned champions of the second season, winning a total of $140,000 for Wagner Ministries International, a missionary organization founded by their father. A portion of the winnings was used for Wagner Ministries' involvement in the "One Nation One Day" evangelical event in Honduras in July 2013. The Wagners had previously won the national championship of Assemblies of God Teen Bible Quiz three times in four years.

=== Season three ===
On August 8, 2013, GSN announced plans to renew The American Bible Challenge for a third season, with both Foxworthy and Franklin returning as hosts. The third season once again consisted of nine episodes, which began airing May 22, 2014. On July 17, 2014, Team Bible Belts, consisting of Jonathan King, Matt Phipps and Brad Harris from Otway, Ohio, were crowned as the third season's champions, winning a total $140,000 for Kicks for Jesus, a nonprofit which combines Bible study and taekwondo. GSN didn't renew the show and it was effectively cancelled.

== Reception ==
David Hinckley of the New York Daily News gave The American Bible Challenge a positive review, saying, "Anyone who knows even a little about the Bible will be unable to resist playing along and matching answers with the teams on the screen." Neil Genzlinger of The New York Times was also pleased, calling the show "nothing if not magnanimous, sending even the losing teams home with a little something for their charities. A spirit of good will prevails." Hank Stuever of The Washington Post was critical, calling the series "just as dull as it sounds," and arguing that "weariness" could be detected in Foxworthy's hosting. Rebecca Cusey of Patheos recommended the series for Christians in particular, saying, "Those that take the Bible as the word of God will enjoy this show." Additionally, Bounce TV expressed excitement when announcing their acquisition of the series in 2013, network chief operating officer Jonathan Katz commented, "We are very confident that the broadcast premieres of The American Bible Challenge and Catch 21 will add fuel to Bounce TV's skyrocketing growth."

The series was honored with two Emmy Award nominations at the 41st Daytime Emmy Awards in 2014. The series received a nomination for Outstanding Game Show, while Foxworthy received one for Outstanding Game Show Host. Both the show and Foxworthy lost to Jeopardy! and Steve Harvey of Family Feud respectively.

== Merchandise ==
In an effort to promote the show's second season, Schmidt released a study book titled The American Bible Challenge: A Daily Reader, Volume 1 in 2013. An online Bible study was also launched on GSN's website at the start of the second season. In addition to the Bible studies, GSN released a mobile game based on the show for Facebook, iOS devices, and Android devices in 2012, while Talicor released a board game based on the series in 2014.
