= Koren Grieveson =

American chef (born 1971)

Koren Grieveson (born 1971) is an American chef who has worked at restaurants in several major metropolitan areas of the US. She has appeared on several cooking television shows.

== Early life, family and education ==
Koren Grieveson was born in Luanda, Angola. Her father was in the poultry industry, so the family moved to several countries including Iran, Brazil, Zimbabwe, and eventually the US, settling in Glastonbury, Connecticut.

She graduated from The Culinary Institute of America (CIA) in 1996.

== Career ==
Grieveson served in the US Army for eight years. After her discharge, she catered for rock bands in New York, at Lollapalooza, and for bands on tour. She worked at various restaurants around the US before becoming executive chef at Resto in New York City. Grieveson has worked in Chicago at Blackbird and Avec and New York restaurants.

She appeared on Top Chef (season 4, judge) and Iron Chef America (season 7, contestant).

== Awards and honors ==
- James Beard Foundation Award 2010 Best Chef Great Lakes for her work at Avec in Chicago
- Food & Wine named her a Best New Chef in 2008

== Personal life ==
She was engaged to celebrity chef Anne Burrell, also a 1996 graduate of CIA. They were engaged in 2012 in Vieques, Puerto Rico but kept it secret even though their relationship was not, until Burrell publicly announced their engagement on December 31, 2012. The couple never married and eventually split.
