= Secrets of a Restaurant Chef =

American food reality television series

- Genre: Cooking show; Food reality television
- Presented by: Anne Burrell
- Country of origin: United States
- Original language: English
- No. of seasons: 9
- No. of episodes: 119 (list of episodes)

Production
- Producer: Pre-Sliced Productions
- Production locations: New York, New York, United States
- Running time: 22:00

Original release
- Network: Food Network
- Release: June 29, 2008 – April 1, 2012

Secrets of a Restaurant Chef is an American cooking show that aired on Food Network. It is presented by chef Anne Burrell; and the series featured Burrell demonstrating how to cook restaurant-quality meals at home.

Secrets of a Restaurant Chef premiered on June 29, 2008, and concluded on April 1, 2012, after nine seasons.

== Awards and nominations ==
Year	Ceremony	Category	Result
2011	Daytime Emmy	Outstanding Culinary Program	Nominated
