= List of Secrets of a Restaurant Chef episodes =

The American cooking television series Secrets of a Restaurant Chef aired on Food Network from 2008 to 2012. A total of 119 episodes of the series aired over nine seasons.

== Episodes ==
Season	Episodes	Originally released	
Season	Episodes	First released	Last released
1	6	June 29, 2008	August 3, 2008
2	13	October 11, 2008	March 28, 2009
3	13	April 8, 2009	July 11, 2009
4	13	September 26, 2009	January 23, 2010
5	15	March 13, 2010	June 19, 2010
6	15	August 7, 2010	December 4, 2010
7	13	January 8, 2011	June 4, 2011
8	17	July 7, 2011	December 10, 2011
9	14	January 7, 2012	April 1, 2012

=== Season 1 (2008) ===
No. overall	No. in season	Title	Original release date
1	1	"The Secret to Pasta Bolognese"	June 29, 2008
2	2	"The Secret to Roasted Leg of Lamb"	July 6, 2008 (Note: "The Secret to Roasted Leg of Lamb" was produced as the fifth episode of the first season and "The Secret to Grilled Pork Chops" was produced as the second episode of the season, but the episodes aired in reverse order.)
3	3	"The Secret to Roasted Chicken"	July 13, 2008
4	4	"The Secret to Seared Bass"	July 20, 2008
5	5	"The Secret to Grilled Pork Chops"	July 27, 2008
6	6	"The Secret to Steamed Mussels"	August 3, 2008

=== Season 2 (2008–2009) ===
No. overall	No. in season	Title	Original release date
7	1	"The Secret to Steak"	October 11, 2008 (Note: "The Secret to Steak" was produced as the tenth episode of the second season, but it aired as the first episode of the season.)
8	2	"The Secret to Braised Chicken"	October 18, 2008 (Note: "The Secret to Braised Chicken" was produced as the sixth episode of the second season, but it aired as the second episode of the season.)
9	3	"The Secret to Pork Loin"	November 15, 2008 (Note: "The Secret to Pork Loin" was produced as the eleventh episode of the second season, but it aired as the third episode of the season.)
10	4	"The Secret to Brunch"	November 29, 2008 (Note: "The Secret to Brunch" was produced as the eighth episode of the second season, but it aired as the fourth episode of the season.)
11	5	"The Secret to Seared Rack of Lamb"	December 6, 2008 (Note: "The Secret to Seared Rack of Lamb" was produced as the fourth episode of the second season, but it aired as the fifth episode of the season.)
12	6	"The Secret to Piccolini"	December 13, 2008 (Note: "The Secret to Piccolini" was produced as the final episode of the second season, but it aired as the sixth episode of the season.)
13	7	"The Secret to Fish in Cartoccio"	January 3, 2009 (Note: "The Secret to Fish in Cartoccio" was produced as the fifth episode of the second season, but it aired as the seventh episode of the season.)
14	8	"The Secret to Chicken Milanese"	January 10, 2009 (Note: "The Secret to Chicken Milanese" was produced as the seventh episode of the second season, but it aired as the eighth episode of the season.)
15	9	"The Secret to Grilled Pizza"	January 24, 2009 (Note: "The Secret to Grilled Pizza" was produced as the twelfth episode of the second season, but it aired as the ninth episode of the season.)
16	10	"The Secret to Spaghetti and Meatballs"	February 21, 2009 (Note: "The Secret to Spaghetti and Meatballs" was produced as the second episode of the second season, but it aired as the tenth episode of the season.)
17	11	"The Secret to Whole Roasted Fish"	March 7, 2009 (Note: "The Secret to Whole Roasted Fish" was produced as the ninth episode of the second season, but it aired as the eleventh episode of the season.)
18	12	"The Secret to Short Ribs"	March 14, 2009 (Note: "The Secret to Short Ribs" was produced as the third episode of the second season, but it aired as the twelfth episode of the season.)
19	13	"The Secret to Risotto"	March 28, 2009 (Note: "The Secret to Risotto" was produced as the first episode of the second season, but it aired as the final episode of the season.)

=== Season 3 (2009) ===
No. overall	No. in season	Title	Original release date
20	1	"The Secret to Spaghetti Carbonara"	April 18, 2009
21	2	"The Secret to Braised Spareribs"	April 25, 2009
22	3	"The Secret to Grilled Salmon"	May 2, 2009
23	4	"The Secret to Chicken Cacciatore"	May 9, 2009
24	5	"The Secret to Tapas"	May 16, 2009
25	6	"The Secret to French Onion Soup"	May 23, 2009
26	7	"The Secret to Pork Tenderloin"	May 30, 2009
27	8	"The Secret to Pollo Al Mattone"	June 6, 2009
28	9	"The Secret to Grilled Beef Tenderloin"	June 13, 2009
29	10	"The Secret to Duck Confit"	June 20, 2009
30	11	"The Secret to Gnocchi"	June 27, 2009
31	12	"The Secret to Chilled Asparagus Soup"	July 4, 2009
32	13	"The Secret to Clam and Cod Cacciucco"	July 11, 2009

=== Season 4 (2009–2010) ===
No. overall	No. in season	Title	Original release date
33	1	"The Secret to Chicken Pot Pie"	September 26, 2009 (Note: "The Secret to Chicken Pot Pie" was produced as the eighth episode of the fourth season, but it aired as the first episode of the season.)
34	2	"The Secret to Stuffed Braised Cabbage"	October 3, 2009 (Note: "The Secret to Stuffed Braised Cabbage" was produced as the tenth episode of the fourth season, but it aired as the second episode of the season.)
35	3	"The Secret to Seared Skate"	October 10, 2009 (Note: "The Secret to Seared Skate" was produced as the eleventh episode of the fourth season, but it aired as the third episode of the season.)
36	4	"The Secret to Hanger Steak"	October 17, 2009 (Note: "The Secret to Hanger Steak" was produced as the first episode of the fourth season, but it aired as the fourth episode of the season.)
37	5	"The Secret to Maple and Cayenne Glazed Chicken"	October 24, 2009 (Note: "The Secret to Maple and Cayenne Glazed Chicken" was produced as the fourth episode of the fourth season, but it aired as the fifth episode of the season.)
38	6	"The Secret to Stuffed Calamari"	October 31, 2009 (Note: "The Secret to Stuffed Calamari" was produced as the fifth episode of the fourth season, but it aired as the sixth episode of the season.)
39	7	"The Secret to Fish and Chips"	November 7, 2009 (Note: "The Secret to Fish and Chips" was produced as the twelfth episode of the fourth season, but it aired as the seventh episode of the season.)
40	8	"The Secret to Brined Turkey"	November 14, 2009 (Note: "The Secret to Brined Turkey" was produced as the ninth episode of the fourth season, but it aired as the eighth episode of the season.)
41	9	"The Secret to Pasta Amatriciana"	November 21, 2009 (Note: "The Secret to Pasta Amatriciana" was produced as the third episode of the fourth season, but it aired as the ninth episode of the season.)
42	10	"The Secret to Seared Duck Breast"	November 28, 2009 (Note: "The Secret to Seared Duck Breast" was produced as the seventh episode of the fourth season, but it aired as the tenth episode of the season.)
43	11	"The Secret to Porchetta"	December 5, 2009 (Note: "The Secret to Porchetta" was produced as the final episode of the fourth season, but it aired as the eleventh episode of the season.)
44	12	"The Secret to Grilled Striped Bass"	January 2, 2010 (Note: "The Secret to Grilled Striped Bass" was produced as the second episode of the fourth season, but it aired as the twelfth episode of the season.)
45	13	"The Secret to Grilled Veal Chops"	January 23, 2010 (Note: "The Secret to Grilled Veal Chops" was produced as the sixth episode of the fourth season, but it aired as the final episode of the season.)

=== Season 5 (2010) ===
No. overall	No. in season	Title	Original release date
46	1	"The Secret to Braised Lamb"	March 13, 2010 (Note: "The Secret to Braised Lamb" was produced as the fourth episode of the fifth season, but it aired as the first episode of the season.)
47	2	"The Secret to Chicken Noodle Soup"	March 20, 2010 (Note: "The Secret to Chicken Noodle Soup" was produced as the first episode of the fifth season, but it aired as the second episode of the season.)
48	3	"The Secret to Pan-Fried Trout"	March 27, 2010 (Note: "The Secret to Pan-Fried Trout" was produced as the sixth episode of the fifth season, but it aired as the third episode of the season.)
49	4	"The Secret to Fresh Brined Ham"	April 3, 2010 (Note: "The Secret to Fresh Brined Ham" was produced as the eleventh episode of the fifth season, but it aired as the fourth episode of the season.)
50	5	"The Secret to Coq Au Vin"	April 10, 2010
51	6	"The Secret to Linguine With Clam Sauce"	April 17, 2010 (Note: "The Secret to Linguine With Clam Sauce" was produced as the tenth episode of the fifth season, but it aired as the sixth episode of the season.)
52	7	"The Secret to Fish in Braciole"	April 24, 2010 (Note: "The Secret to Fish in Braciole" was produced as the ninth episode of the fifth season, but it aired as the seventh episode of the season.)
53	8	"The Secret to Potato Encrusted Halibut"	May 1, 2010 (Note: "The Secret to Potato Encrusted Halibut" was produced as the seventh episode of the fifth season, but it aired as the eighth episode of the season.)
54	9	"The Secret to Manicotti"	May 8, 2010 (Note: "The Secret to Manicotti" was produced as the thirteenth episode of the fifth season, but it aired as the ninth episode of the season.)
55	10	"The Secret to Lamb Stew"	May 15, 2010 (Note: "The Secret to Lamb Stew" was produced as the eighth episode of the fifth season, but it aired as the tenth episode of the season.)
56	11	"The Secret to a Healthy Children's Menu"	May 22, 2010 (Note: "The Secret to a Healthy Children's Menu" was produced as the second episode of the fifth season, but it aired as the eleventh episode of the season.)
57	12	"The Secret to Steakhouse Dinner"	May 29, 2010
58	13	"The Secret to Dijon-Lemon Grilled Chicken"	June 5, 2010 (Note: "The Secret to Dijon-Lemon Grilled Chicken" was produced as the third episode of the fifth season, but it aired as the thirteenth episode of the season.)
59	14	"The Secret to Fresh Pasta"	June 12, 2010 (Note: "The Secret to Fresh Pasta" was produced as the final episode of the fifth season and "The Secret to Pancake Breakfast" was produced as the fourteenth episode of the season, but the episodes aired in reverse order.)
60	15	"The Secret to Pancake Breakfast"	June 19, 2010

=== Season 6 (2010) ===
No. overall	No. in season	Title	Original release date
61	1	"The Secret to Grilled Steak"	August 7, 2010 (Note: "The Secret to Grilled Steak" was produced as the fourteenth episode of the sixth season, but it aired as the first episode of the season.)
62	2	"Secret to Swiss Chard and Ricotta Crostata"	August 14, 2010 (Note: "Secret to Swiss Chard and Ricotta Crostata" was produced as the ninth episode of the sixth season, but it aired as the second episode of the season.)
63	3	"The Secret to Soft Shell Crab"	August 21, 2010 (Note: "The Secret to Soft Shell Crab" was produced as the fourth episode of the sixth season, but it aired as the third episode of the season.)
64	4	"The Secret to Tagliatelle With Rock Shrimp"	August 28, 2010 (Note: "The Secret to Tagliatelle With Rock Shrimp" was produced as the tenth episode of the sixth season, but it aired as the fourth episode of the season.)
65	5	"The Secret to Dry Rubbed Ribs"	September 4, 2010
66	6	"The Secret to Lamb Shoulder Chops"	September 11, 2010 (Note: "The Secret to Lamb Shoulder Chops" was produced as the first episode of the sixth season, but it aired as the sixth episode of the season.)
67	7	"The Secret to Spinach and Ricotta Gnocchi"	September 18, 2010 (Note: "The Secret to Spinach and Ricotta Gnocchi" was produced as the twelfth episode of the sixth season, but it aired as the seventh episode of the season.)
68	8	"The Secret to Roasted Garlic Chicken"	September 25, 2010 (Note: "The Secret to Roasted Garlic Chicken" was produced as the thirteenth episode of the sixth season, but it aired as the eighth episode of the season.)
69	9	"The Secret to Braised Pork Belly"	October 2, 2010 (Note: "The Secret to Braised Pork Belly" was produced as the seventh episode of the sixth season, but it aired as the ninth episode of the season.)
70	10	"The Secret to Herb-Crusted Halibut"	October 9, 2010 (Note: "The Secret to Herb-Crusted Halibut" was produced as the eighth episode of the sixth season, but it aired as the tenth episode of the season.)
71	11	"The Secret to Pork Kebabs"	October 16, 2010 (Note: "The Secret to Pork Kebabs" was produced as the second episode of the sixth season, but it aired as the eleventh episode of the season.)
72	12	"The Secret to Harissa Grilled Chicken"	October 23, 2010 (Note: "The Secret to Harissa Grilled Chicken" was produced as the fifteenth episode of the sixth season, but it aired as the twelfth episode of the season.)
73	13	"The Secret to Fish Tacos"	November 6, 2010 (Note: "The Secret to Fish Tacos" was produced as the sixth episode of the sixth season, but it aired as the thirteenth episode of the season.)
74	14	"The Secret to Stuffed Turkey Breast"	November 13, 2010 (Note: "The Secret to Stuffed Turkey Breast" was produced as the eleventh episode of the sixth season, but it aired as the fourteenth episode of the season.)
75	15	"The Secret to Standing Rib Roast"	December 4, 2010 (Note: "The Secret to Standing Rib Roast" was produced as the third episode of the sixth season, but it aired as the fifteenth episode of the season.)

=== Season 7 (2011) ===
No. overall	No. in season	Title	Original release date
76	1	"The Secret to Poached Salmon"	January 8, 2011 (Note: "The Secret to Poached Salmon" was produced as the second episode of the seventh season, but it aired as the first episode of the season.)
77	2	"The Secret to Osso Buco"	January 22, 2011 (Note: "The Secret to Osso Buco" was produced as the third episode of the seventh season, but it aired as the second episode of the season.)
78	3	"The Secret to Lasagna"	January 29, 2011 (Note: "The Secret to Lasagna" was produced as the tenth episode of the seventh season, but it aired as the third episode of the season.)
79	4	"The Secret to Gulf Shrimp Jambalaya"	February 5, 2011 (Note: "The Secret to Gulf Shrimp Jambalaya" was produced as the thirteenth episode of the seventh season, but it aired as the fourth episode of the season.)
80	5	"The Secret to Cumin and Ginger Rubbed Pork Tenderloin"	February 12, 2011 (Note: "The Secret to Cumin and Ginger Rubbed Pork Tenderloin" was produced as the first episode of the seventh season, but it aired as the fifth episode of the season.)
81	6	"The Secret to Beef Brisket"	February 19, 2011 (Note: "The Secret to Beef Brisket" was produced as the fourth episode of the seventh season, but it aired as the sixth episode of the season.)
82	7	"The Secret to Shepherd's Pie"	February 26, 2011 (Note: "The Secret to Shepherd's Pie" was produced as the fifteenth episode of the seventh season, but it aired as the seventh episode of the season.)
83	8	"The Secret to Apple and Prune Stuffed Pork Loin"	March 5, 2011
84	9	"The Secret to Sole Meunière"	March 12, 2011
85	10	"The Secret to Chicken Scarpiello"	March 19, 2011 (Note: "The Secret to Chicken Scarpiello" was produced as the fifth episode of the seventh season, but it aired as the tenth episode of the season.)
86	11	"The Secret to Pomegranate Cornish Game Hens"	March 26, 2011
87	12	"The Secret to Beef Bourguignonne"	May 7, 2011 (Note: "The Secret to Beef Bourguignonne" was produced as the fourteenth episode of the seventh season, but it aired as the twelfth episode of the season.)
88	13	"The Secret to Pulled Pork"	June 4, 2011 (Note: "The Secret to Pulled Pork" was produced as the seventh episode of the seventh season, but it aired as the thirteenth episode of the season.)

=== Season 8 (2011) ===
No. overall	No. in season	Title	Original release date
89	1	"The Secret to Lobster Rolls"	July 2, 2011 (Note: "The Secret to Lobster Rolls" was produced as the fifth episode of the eighth season, but it aired as the first episode of the season.)
90	2	"The Secret to Seared Black Bass"	July 9, 2011 (Note: "The Secret to Seared Black Bass" was produced as the ninth episode of the eighth season, but it aired as the second episode of the season.)
91	3	"The Secret to Falafel"	July 16, 2011 (Note: "The Secret to Falafel" was produced as the seventh episode of the eighth season, but it aired as the third episode of the season.)
92	4	"The Secret to Chicken Roulades"	July 23, 2011 (Note: "The Secret to Chicken Roulades" was produced as the seventh episode of the eighth season, but it aired as the third episode of the season.)
93	5	"The Secret to Eggs Benedict"	July 30, 2011 (Note: "The Secret to Eggs Benedict" was produced as the third episode of the eighth season, but it aired as the fifth episode of the season.)
94	6	"The Secret to Cod and Shrimp"	August 6, 2011 (Note: "The Secret to Cod and Shrimp" was produced as the sixth episode of the seventh season, but it aired as the sixth episode of the eighth season.)
95	7	"The Secret to Schnitzel"	August 13, 2011 (Note: "The Secret to Schnitzel" was produced as the fourth episode of the eighth season, but it aired as the seventh episode of the season.)
96	8	"The Secret to Seared Tuna"	August 20, 2011 (Note: "The Secret to Seared Tuna" was produced as the second episode of the eighth season, but it aired as the eighth episode of the season.)
97	9	"The Secret to Turkey Burgers"	August 27, 2011 (Note: "The Secret to Turkey Burgers" was produced as the fourteenth episode of the eighth season, but it aired as the ninth episode of the season.)
98	10	"The Secret to Grilled Hanger Steak"	September 3, 2011
99	11	"The Secret to Braised Pork Shoulder"	September 10, 2011
100	12	"The Secret to Braised Stuffed Veal Breast"	October 1, 2011 (Note: "The Secret to Braised Stuffed Veal Breast" was produced as the sixth episode of the eighth season, but it aired as the twelfth episode of the season.)
101	13	"The Secret to Wild Boar Ragu"	October 8, 2011
102	14	"The Secret to Pot Roast"	October 15, 2011
103	15	"The Secret to Braised Chicken with Tomatillos and Jalapeños"	November 5, 2011 (Note: "The Secret to Braised Chicken with Tomatillos and Jalapeños" was produced as the twelfth episode of the eighth season, but it aired as the fifteenth episode of the season.)
104	16	"The Secret to Sausage Stuffed Quail"	November 26, 2011 (Note: "The Secret to Sausage Stuffed Quail" was produced as the fifteenth episode of the eighth season, but it aired as the sixteenth episode of the season.)
105	17	"The Secret to a Holiday Meal"	December 10, 2011 (Note: "The Secret a Holiday Meal" was produced as the first episode of the eighth season, but it aired as the seventeenth episode of the season.)

=== Season 9 (2012) ===
No. overall	No. in season	Title	Original release date
106	1	"The Secret to Seared Cod with Blood Orange Glaze"	January 7, 2012 (Note: "The Secret to Seared Cod with Blood Orange Glaze" was produced as the sixth episode of the ninth season, but it aired as the first episode of the season.)
107	2	"The Secret to Grilled Skirt Steak"	January 15, 2012 (Note: "The Secret to Grilled Skirt Steak" was produced as the eighth episode of the ninth season, but it aired as the second episode of the season.)
108	3	"The Secret to Crispy Stuffed Chicken Breasts"	January 22, 2012 (Note: "The Secret to Crispy Stuffed Chicken Breasts" was produced as the first episode of the ninth season, but it aired as the third episode of the season.)
109	4	"The Secret to Calzones"	January 29, 2012 (Note: "The Secret to Calzones" was produced as the fourth episode of the ninth season and "The Secret to Pork Porterhouse" was produced as the twelfth episode of the season, but the episodes aired in reverse order.)
110	5	"The Secret to Seared Duck Breasts"	February 5, 2012 (Note: "The Secret to Seared Duck Breasts" was produced as the second episode of the ninth season, but it aired as the fifth episode of the season.)
111	6	"The Secret to Arctic Char"	February 12, 2012 (Note: "The Secret to Arctic Char" was produced as the third episode of the ninth season, but it aired as the sixth episode of the season.)
112	7	"The Secret to Pork Sausage"	February 19, 2012
113	8	"The Secret to Noodleless Butternut Squash and Pork Lasagna"	February 27, 2012 (Note: "The Secret to Noodleless Butternut Squash and Pork Lasagna" was produced as the eleventh episode of the ninth season, but it aired as the eighth episode of the season.)
114	9	"The Secret to Coriander Chicken with Hammered Cauliflower"	March 4, 2012 (Note: "The Secret to Coriander Chicken with Hammered Cauliflower" was produced as the thirteenth episode of the ninth season, but it aired as the ninth episode of the season.)
115	10	"The Secret to Asian Braised Pork Shoulder"	March 11, 2012 (Note: "The Secret to Asian Braised Pork Shoulder" was produced as the ninth episode of the ninth season, but it aired as the tenth episode of the season.)
116	11	"The Secret to Veal Piccata"	March 18, 2012 (Note: "The Secret to Veal Piccata" was produced as the twelfth episode of the seventh season, but it aired as the eleventh episode of the ninth season.)
117	12	"The Secret to Pork Porterhouse"	March 18, 2012
118	13	"The Secret to Salt-Crusted Fish"	March 25, 2012 (Note: "The Secret to Salt-Crusted Fish" was produced as the tenth episode of the ninth season, but it aired as the thirteenth episode of the season.)
119	14	"The Secret to Lamb Burgers"	April 1, 2012 (Note: "The Secret to Lamb Burgers" was produced as the fifth episode of the ninth season, but it aired as the fourteenth episode of the season.)
