= Worst Cooks in America season 3 =

Worst Cooks in America
- Season 3
- Judges: Anne Burrell; Bobby Flay
- No. of contestants: 16
- Winner: Kelli Powers
- Winning mentor: Anne Burrell
- Runner-up: Vinnie Caligiuri
- No. of episodes: 8

Release
- Original network: Food Network
- Original release: February 12 – April 1, 2012

Season chronology
- ← Previous; Season 2 Next → Season 4

Worst Cooks in America 3, is the third season of the American competitive reality television series Worst Cooks in America. It premiered on Food Network on February 12, 2012, and concluded on April 1, 2012. Kelli Powers was declared the winner of this season, with Vinnie Caligiuri as the runner-up.

== Format ==
Worst Cooks in America is an American reality television series in which contestants (referred to as "recruits") with poor cooking skills undergo a culinary boot camp for the chance to win $25,000 and a Food Network cooking set. The recruits are trained on the various basic cooking techniques including baking, knife skills, temperature, seasoning and preparation. Each episode features two core challenges: the Skills Drill, which tests their grasp of basic techniques demonstrated by the chef mentors, and the Main Dish Challenge, where they must apply those skills to recreate or invent a more complex dish under specific guidelines. The weakest performer is eliminated at the end of each episode. The final two contestants prepare a restaurant-quality, three-course meal for a panel of food critics, who evaluate the dishes based on taste, presentation, and overall improvement.

== Judges ==
Anne Burrell hosted season 3 with Bobby Flay, who replaced Robert Irvine.

== Recruits ==
| Contestant | Age | Hometown | Occupation | Team | Status |
|---|---|---|---|---|---|
| Kelli Powers | 40 | Los Angeles, California | Stay-at-home mother | Anne | Winner on April 1, 2012 |
| Vinnie Caligiuri | 47 | Philadelphia, Pennsylvania | Mortgage broker | Bobby | Runner-up on April 1, 2012 |
| Melissa Rhodes | 28 | Naples, Florida | Nursing Student | Bobby | Eliminated on March 25, 2012 |
| David Shelton | 26 | Longview, Texas | Unemployed | Anne | Eliminated on March 25, 2012 |
| Tiffany Michelle | 27 | Los Angeles, California | Poker player and actress | Bobby | Eliminated on March 18, 2012 |
| Dorothy Strouhal | 38 | Cove, Texas | Make-up artist | Anne | Eliminated on March 18, 2012 |
| Anthony Schiano | 33 | Massapequa, New York | Mechanical engineer | Anne | Eliminated on March 11, 2012 |
| Benjamin Dennis | 37 | Dallas, Texas | Stay-at-home father | Bobby | Withdrew on March 11, 2012 |
| Sean "Bennett" Bennett | 36 | New York City | Automotive Spokesperson | Anne | Eliminated on March 4, 2012 |
| Sarina Weeraprajuk | 31 | West Covina, California | Wedding photographer | Bobby | Eliminated on March 4, 2012 |
| Erica Weidner | 53 | Long Beach, New York | Court Reporter Student | Bobby | Eliminated on February 26, 2012 |
| Robert "Bob" Tamke | 44 | Massapequa Park, New York | DJ | Anne | Eliminated on February 26, 2012 |
| Sherrill Moss-Solomon | 55 | New York City | Fundraiser | Bobby | Eliminated on February 19, 2012 |
| Rachel Margolin | 31 | New York City | Night Club Promoter | Anne | Eliminated on February 19, 2012 |
| Richard Chen | 55 | Queens, New York | Attorney | Anne | Eliminated on February 12, 2012 |
| Libby Floyd | 46 | Eden Prairie, Minnesota | ShopNBC host | Bobby | Eliminated on February 12, 2012 |

== Elimination Chart ==
Team Anne
Team Bobby

* Initially a member of the other team but switched after Team Bobby won a challenge.

| Rank | Contestant | Episode | | | | | | | | | | | | | |
| Rank | Contestant | 1 | 2 | | 3 | | 4 | | 5 | | 6 | | 7 | | 8 |
|---|---|---|---|---|---|---|---|---|---|---|---|---|---|---|---|
| 1 | Kelli | WIN | IN | IN | IN | IN | IN | BTM | WIN | BTM | WIN | WIN | WIN | WIN | WINNER |
| 2 | Vinnie | IN | WIN | WIN | IN | IN | IN | WIN | IN | BTM | IN | WIN | WIN | WIN | RUNNER-UP |
| 3 | Melissa* | IN | IN | IN | SWAP | IN | IN | IN | WIN | WIN | IN | BTM | IN | OUT | |
| 4 | David* | IN | IN | IN | SWAP | IN | IN | WIN | WIN | IN | WIN | BTM | IN | OUT | |
| 5 | Tiffany | WIN | IN | IN | WIN | IN | BTM | BTM | IN | BTM | IN | OUT | | | |
| 6 | Dorothy | IN | IN | WIN | IN | BTM | WIN | IN | WIN | WIN | WIN | OUT | | | |
| 7 | Anthony | IN | IN | IN | IN | IN | IN | IN | WIN | OUT | | | | | |
| 8 | Benjamin | IN | IN | IN | IN | WIN | WIN | IN | IN | WDR | | | | | |
| 9 | Bennett | IN | IN | BTM | BTM | WIN | BTM | OUT | | | | | | | |
| 10 | Sarina | BTM | IN | IN | IN | BTM | IN | OUT | | | | | | | |
| 11 | Erica | IN | IN | BTM | IN | OUT | | | | | | | | | |
| 12 | Bob | IN | WIN | IN | IN | OUT | | | | | | | | | |
| 13 | Sherrill | IN | BTM | OUT | | | | | | | | | | | |
| 14 | Rachel | BTM | BTM | OUT | | | | | | | | | | | |
| 15 | Richard | OUT | | | | | | | | | | | | | |
| 16 | Libby | OUT | | | | | | | | | | | | | |

Key
(WINNER) This contestant won the competition and was crowned "Best of the Worst".
(RUNNER-UP) The contestant was the runner-up in the finals of the competition.
(WIN) The contestant did the best on their team in the week's Main Dish challenge and was considered the winner.
(BTM) The contestant was selected as one of the bottom entries in the Main Dish challenge, but was not eliminated.
(SWAP) The contestant get switched by a mentor to the other team
(OUT) The contestant lost that week's Main Dish challenge and was out of the competition
(WDR) The contestant volunteered to quit

== Episodes ==
| No. overall | No. in season | Title | Original release date |
|---|---|---|---|
| 15 | 1 | "Best of the Worst" | February 12, 2012 |
| 16 | 2 | "Going Global" | February 19, 2012 |
| 17 | 3 | "Extreme Flavor" | February 26, 2012 |
| 18 | 4 | "Late Night/Date Night" | March 4, 2012 |
| 19 | 5 | "Luck of the Irish" | March 11, 2012 |
| 20 | 6 | "Something Fishy" | March 18, 2012 |
| 21 | 7 | "Kicked Off by Kinfolk" | March 25, 2012 |
| 22 | 8 | "Worst of the First: The Final Battle" | April 1, 2012 |
