= Beau MacMillan =

American chef and television personality

- Born: March 4, 1971 (age 55); Maine, United States
- Education: Johnson and Wales University
- Spouse: Tiffany Erickson MacMillan
- Culinary career
- Current restaurant: elements
- Television shows: Beat the Chefs; Guy's Grocery Games; Worst Cooks in America

Beau MacMillan (born March 4, 1971) is an American chef and television personality. He is the executive chef for Sanctuary on Camelback Mountain, an upscale resort in Arizona, and its featured restaurant, elements. He is also known by his nickname, "BeauMac."

== Career ==
At 16 years old, MacMillan started working at Crane Brook Tea Room in Carver. He worked under Chef Francois de Melogue for a year. He went on La Vieille Maison in Boca Raton, Florida, eventually promoted to sous chef.

MacMillan moved to Los Angeles to become sous chef at Hotel Bel-Air. He was later hired at Shutters on the Beach in Santa Monica. In 1998, he was hired as the Executive Chef at the Sanctuary on Camelback Mountain (formerly known as The Ranch on Camelback).

In 2022 Beau MacMillan opened up CALA in Scottsdale, Arizona with his partners Mikis Troyan and Justin Massei of Clive Collective. In 2024 Beau MacMillan, with his partners at Clive Collective and Creation Hospitality, opened Tell Your Friends in North Scottsdale, AZ. In 2025 Beau and his partners with Clive Collective opened Neon Spur in Tempe, AZ.

== Television career ==
While MacMillan was handing out hors d'oeuvres at the Aspen Food & Wine festival in 2005, Food Network's senior vice president of program planning, Bruce Seidel, approached him. Seidel had visited MacMillan at elements and invited him to take a turn on Iron Chef America, where he eventually beat Bobby Flay in "Battle American Kobe Beef."

In early 2010, MacMillan co-hosted Season 1 of Food Network's Worst Cooks in America with Anne Burrell, and in August 2012, he joined the pro team on Beat the Chefs on the Game Show Network.

In 2011, he participated in The Next Iron Chef and was eliminated from the competition in the fourth episode.

He also was on Guy's Grocery Games as a judge and a chef who won $16,000 for his second favorite charity, St. Mary's Food Bank.
