= Anne Burrell =

American television chef (1969–2025)

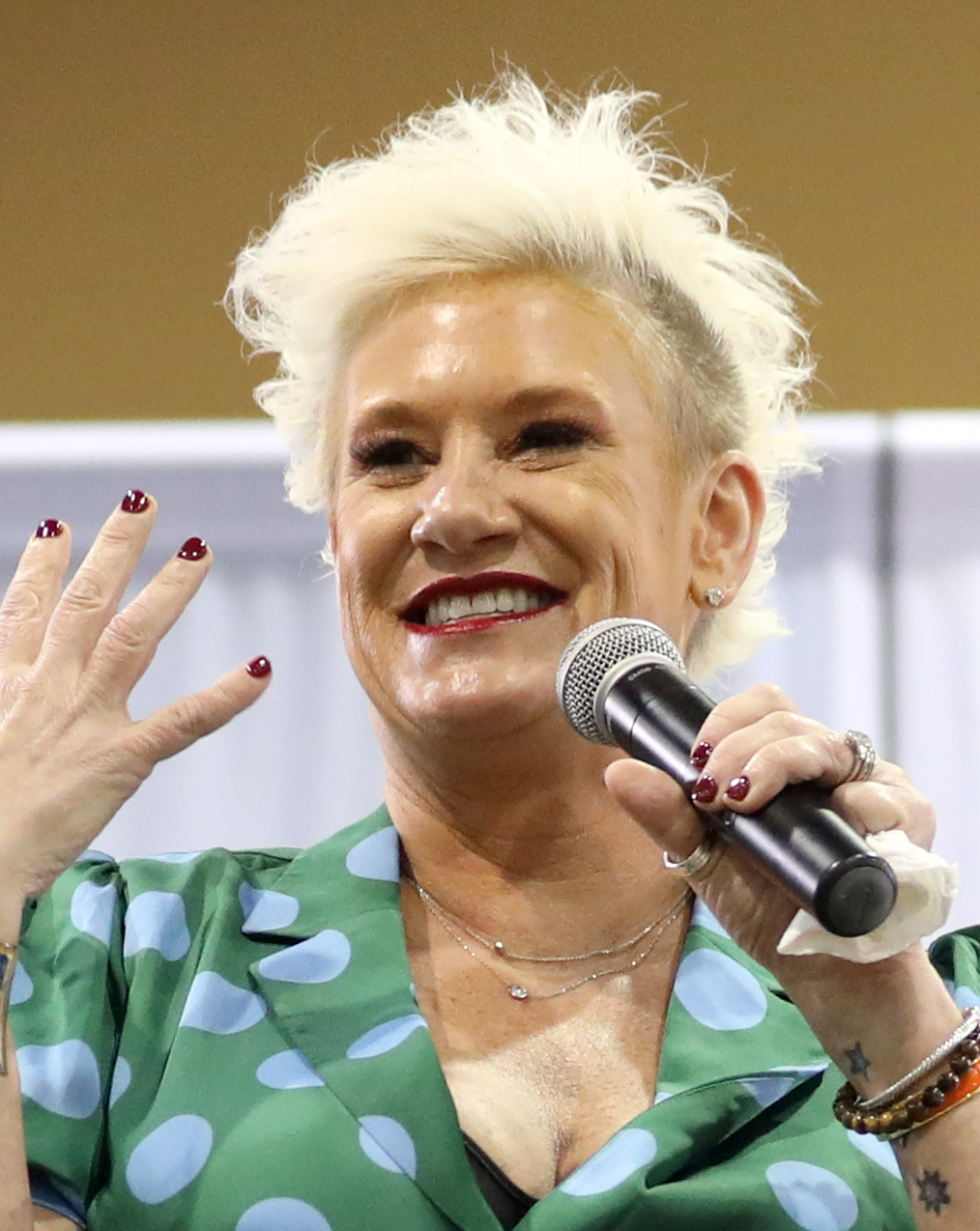
- Burrell in 2024
- Born: September 21, 1969; Cazenovia, New York, U.S.
- Died: June 17, 2025 (aged 55); New York City, U.S.
- Education: The Culinary Institute of America; Canisius College; Italian Culinary Institute for Foreigners
- Occupations: Chef; television personality; instructor
- Spouse: Stuart Claxton (m. 2021)
- Culinary career
- Previous restaurants
- Centro Vinoteca; Savoy; Felidia
- Television shows
- Secrets of a Restaurant Chef; Worst Cooks in America; Chef Wanted with Anne Burrell; Vegas Chef Prizefight

Anne W. Burrell (September 21, 1969 – June 17, 2025) was an American chef, television personality, and instructor at the Institute of Culinary Education. She hosted the Food Network show Secrets of a Restaurant Chef and was co-host of Worst Cooks in America. She was also one of Mario Batali's sous chefs in the Iron Chef America series and appeared on other programs on the network such as The Best Thing I Ever Ate.

== Early life ==
Anne W. Burrell was born on September 21, 1969, in Cazenovia, New York. She first became interested in cooking at the age of three after watching fellow American chef Julia Child and noticing her mother's homemade foods. Her mother, Marlene, owned a flower shop. Her father was initially not supportive of her career in cooking but later gave his support. Burrell's first job was at a restaurant in downtown Syracuse, New York. She later attended Canisius College in Buffalo, New York, graduating with a Bachelor of Arts (BA) degree in English and Communications in 1991.

A year later, Burrell enrolled at the Culinary Institute of America, graduating in 1996 with an Associate in Occupational Studies (A.O.S.). She also studied at the Italian Culinary Institute for Foreigners (ICIF) in Asti in the Piedmont region, Italy.

== Career ==
=== Restaurants ===
After her ICIF experience, Burrell remained in Italy, working in various restaurants for nine months. She worked at La Bottega del '30, a small restaurant in Tuscany, Italy, with one seating each night. Burrell returned to the US as a sous chef at Felidia, owned by celebrity chef Lidia Bastianich. She became the chef at Savoy, a small prix fixe dining room. After Savoy, Burrell began teaching at the Institute of Culinary Education. Lidia Bastianich's son and restaurateur, Joe Bastianich, and Chef Mario Batali named Burrell the chef for Italian Wine Merchants, their New York wine store.

She later became the executive chef of Centro Vinoteca, an Italian restaurant in New York City's West Village area which opened in 2007. She left the restaurant in September 2008 due to her busy schedule and many commitments. The departure also meant that she would not start at Gusto Ristorante, as both of the restaurants are part of Mangia Hospitality Group. Burrell planned to open her first restaurant in 2010 in New York City. Burrell opened her restaurant, Phil & Anne's Good Time Lounge, in Brooklyn in spring 2017, though as of April 2018, the restaurant had closed.

=== Television ===
In 2005, Iron Chef Mario Batali asked Burrell to serve as one of his sous chefs, along with chef and restaurateur Mark Ladner, for a pilot taping of Food Network's Iron Chef America series. She continued to serve as his sous chef during his tenure with the show. Burrell's Food Network series Secrets of a Restaurant Chef debuted June 29, 2008. In 2009, she appeared on another Food Network show, The Best Thing I Ever Ate, in which chefs recount their favorite dishes.

In 2010, Burrell and Chef Beau MacMillan hosted Worst Cooks in America, a Food Network reality TV series. Burrell and her co-host led contestants through a "culinary boot camp" on their journey to become better cooks. The first season premiered on January 3, 2010. Chef Burrell won the competition when her recruit, Rachel Coleman, beat MacMillan's recruit, Jenny Cross. The second season premiered on January 2, 2011, with Chef MacMillan being replaced by Chef Robert Irvine. To raise the stakes, Irvine and Burrell made a side bet, in which Burrell risked losing her signature hair and Irvine risked going platinum. Chef Burrell won both won the competition and the side-bet, when her recruit, Joshie Berger, beat Irvine's recruit, Georg Coleman.

Also in 2011, Burrell became the fourth runner-up in the culinary competition The Next Iron Chef on the Food Network, being eliminated in week six of the competition. The third season of Worst Cooks in America premiered on February 12, 2012. Chef Bobby Flay was the new co-host/chef for season three. Chef Burrell again won the competition, when her recruit Kelli Powers defeated Flay's recruit, Vinnie Caligiuri. Season four started on February 17, 2013. Season four concluded with Flay's team finally defeating Burrell's team, when his recruit, Alina Bolshakova, beat Burrell's recruit, Rasheeda Brown. She was also a contestant on the first season of Chopped All-Stars tournament, where she placed second runner up to Nate Appleman (winner) and Aarón Sanchez. In 2015, Burrell won the fourth installment of the Chopped All-Stars tournament, winning $75,000 for the Juvenile Diabetes Research Foundation.

=== Other projects ===
In 2009, Burrell appeared with fellow Food Network personality Guy Fieri on the Guy Fieri Roadshow. Burrell, along with fellow Food Network personalities Sunny Anderson and Claire Robinson, appeared in the 2009 Macy's Thanksgiving Day Parade on the Food Network float. Burrell hosted an 11-day Food Network cruise throughout the Mediterranean and across the Atlantic aboard the brand new Celebrity Silhouette in late 2011. From June 2012 through October 2013, Burrell hosted Chef Wanted with Anne Burrell on the Food Network. The show ran for three seasons and 36 episodes.

Burrell's two cookbooks with Suzanne Lenzer, Cook Like a Rock Star (2011; ISBN 9780307886750) and Own Your Kitchen: Recipes to Inspire and Empower (2013; ISBN 9780385345576), were New York Times bestsellers.

Burrell had been studying improvisational comedy at The Second City in Brooklyn, and had performed there on the evening before her death.

== Personal life and death ==
Burrell released a statement in 2012 confirming that she had been in a relationship with her girlfriend, chef Koren Grieveson, for two years after cookbook author Ted Allen seemingly outed her on a radio show. Burrell disputed the notion that she had been outed, saying she had not kept her sexuality a secret. On December 31, 2012, Burrell tweeted that she was engaged to Grieveson, but the two later broke up.

In 2018, she met Stuart Claxton through the dating app Bumble. On April 21, 2020, Burrell announced that she and Claxton were engaged. The two married on October 16, 2021.

Burrell died at her apartment in Brooklyn on June 17, 2025, at the age of 55. Her death was ruled a suicide from "the combined effects of diphenhydramine, ethanol, cetirizine, and amphetamine".
