= List of Flavour Network personalities =

This is a list of past and present personalities associated with the Flavour Network (formerly Food Network Canada) television network.

== A ==
- Hugh Acheson, Iron Chef on Iron Chef Canada
- Nobu Adilman, one of three hosts of Food Jammers
- David Adjey, makes several appearances as a chef on Restaurant Makeover
- Michael Allemeier, host of Cook Like a Chef
- Ted Allen, a judge on season three of Top Chef, frequent judge on Iron Chef America, host of Food Detectives and Chopped
- Camila Alves, co-hosted Kids BBQ Championship
- Pamela Anderson, host of Pamela's Cooking with Love
- Sunny Anderson co-hosts The Kitchen, and hosts Cooking For Real, and hosted of How'd That Get On My Plate?, and more
- Thea Andrews, host of Top Chef Canada
- Shereen Arazm, resident judge on Top Chef Canada

== B ==
- Mario Batali, has hosted Malto Mario, Ciao America with Mario Batali, Mario, Full Boil, and was an Iron Chef on Iron Chef America
- Ned Bell, has made appearances on Cook Like a Chef
- Valerie Bertinelli, hosts Valerie's Home Cooking and co-hosts Kids Baking Championship
- Richard Blais, frequent judge on Guy's Grocery Games
- Bob Blumer creator/host of Surreal Gourmet and Glutton for Punishment
- Brian Boitano hosted of What Would Brian Boitano Make?
- Michael Bonacini
- Anthony Bourdain, hosted of A Cook's Tour
- Kevin Brauch, floor reporter on Iron Chef America and hosted The Thirsty Traveler
- Alton Brown, presenter on Iron Chef America and hosts Good Eats; hosted Cutthroat Kitchen, Feasting on Asphalt, and more
- Anne Burrell, rotating mentor on Worst Cooks in America and frequent judge on Beat Bobby Flay; hosted Secrets of a Restaurant Chef, Chef Wanted with Anne Burrell, and Vegas Chef Prizefight

== C ==
- Laura Calder, hosted French Food at Home
- Noah Cappe, host of Carnival Eats and Wall of Chefs, co-hosted The Great Canadian Cookbook
- Massimo Capra, was a rotating a chef on Restaurant Makeover
- John Catucci, hosted You Gotta Eat Here! and Big Food Bucket List
- Michael Chiarello, frequent judge on Chopped
- Maneet Chauhan, frequent judge on Chopped
- Tom Colicchio, head judge on the show Top Chef
- Scott Conant, frequent judge on Chopped
- Cat Cora, former Iron Chef on Iron Chef America
- Chris Cosentino co-host of Chefs vs. City
- Lynn Crawford, Iron Chef on Iron Chef Canada and rotating judge on Wall of Chefs, former rotating chef on Restaurant Makeover, frequent judge on Chopped Canada, hosted Pitchin' In, and co-hosted The Great Canadian Cookbook
- Madison Cowan, occasional judge on Guy's Grocery Games
- Christine Cushing, hosted Christine Cushing Live and Cook With Me

== D ==
- Melissa d'Arabian, frequent judge on Guy's Grocery Games
- Mark Dacascos, the "Chairman" on Iron Chef America
- Giada De Laurentiis
- Bobby Deen, co-hosted of Road Tasted and was the first host of both Spring Baking Championship and Holiday Baking Championship
- Jamie Deen, co-hosted of Road Tasted
- Paula Deen
- Clarissa Dickson Wright, former co-host of Two Fat Ladies
- Matt Dunigan, hosted of Road Grill
- George Duran

== E ==
- Gordon Elliott, hosted of Gordon Elliot's Doorknock Dinners
- Ethan Erickson hosted of Chefs vs. City
- Duskie Estes, occasional judge on Guy's Grocery Games

== F ==
- Tiffani Faison, occasional judge on Chopped
- Rob Feenie
- Guy Fieri, hosts Guy's Grocery Games and Diners, Drive-Ins and Dives; hosted Guy's Big Bite
- Bobby Flay
- Tyler Florence
- Tregaye Fraser, was a rotating chef on Kitchen Sink
- Marc Forgione, Iron Chef on Iron Chef America
- Amanda Freitag, frequent judge on Chopped

== G ==
- Ina Garten, Barefoot Contessa
- Nadia Giosia, hosted of Bitchin' Kitchen
- Duff Goldman, hosted of Ace of Cakes
- Alex Guarnaschelli

== H ==
- Carla Hall, judge on Holiday Baking Championship
- Patricia Heaton, Patricia Heaton Parties
- Meredith Heron, designer on Restaurant Makeover
- Chuck Hughes, hosted of Chuck's Day Off

== I ==
- Stephanie Izard, Iron Chef on Iron Chef America

== J ==
- Eddie Jackson, co-hosted Kids BBQ Championship
- Katie Lee Joel, hosted season one of Top Chef
- Troy Johnson, frequent judge on Guy's Grocery Games
- Judy Joo, Iron Chef on Iron Chef UK, occasional judge on Guy's Grocery Games, resident judge on The Next Iron Chef, and more

== K ==
- Clinton Kelly, hosted Spring Baking Championship
- Ken Kostick
- Kylie Kwong

== L ==
- Emeril Lagasse
- Padma Lakshmi, host of Top Chef starting at season two
- Ricardo Larrivée, host of Ricardo and Friends
- Nigella Lawson, hosts or has hosted Nigella Bites, Forever Summer with Nigella, and others
- Susur Lee, Iron Chef on Iron Chef Canada, was a chef on one episode of Restaurant Makeover, and frequent judge on Chopped Canada
- Dave Lieberman
- Brad Long, was a rotating chef on Restaurant Makeover
- Pete Luckett

== M ==
- Beau MacMillan, frequent judge on Guy's Grocery Games, and was a mentor on season 1 of Worst Cooks in America
- Angie Mar, occasional judge on Chopped
- James Martin, host of Sweet Baby James
- Jeff Mauro, co-host of The Kitchen, hosted Sandwich King and $24 in 24, and was a rotating chef on Kitchen Sink
- Catherine McCord, frequent judge on Guy's Grocery Games
- Dean McDermott, first host of Chopped Canada
- Mark McEwan, star of The Heat with Mark McEwan and head judge on Top Chef Canada
- Spike Mendelsohn, was a rotating chef on Kitchen Sink
- Robin Miller, host of Quick Fix Meals with Robin Miller
- Aida Mollenkamp occasional judge on Guy's Grocery Games and hosted Ask Aida
- Roger Mooking, hosted Everyday Exotic, was a frequent judge on Chopped Canada, and was an occasional guest judge on Kids BBQ Championship
- Masaharu Morimoto, Iron Chef Japanese
- Sara Moulton, hosted Sara's Secrets and Sara Moulton Live
- Marc Murphy, frequent judge on Chopped, judge on Beat Bobby Flay, judge on Iron Chef America, and more

== N ==
- Nadia Giosia, hosted of Bitchin' Kitchen

== O ==
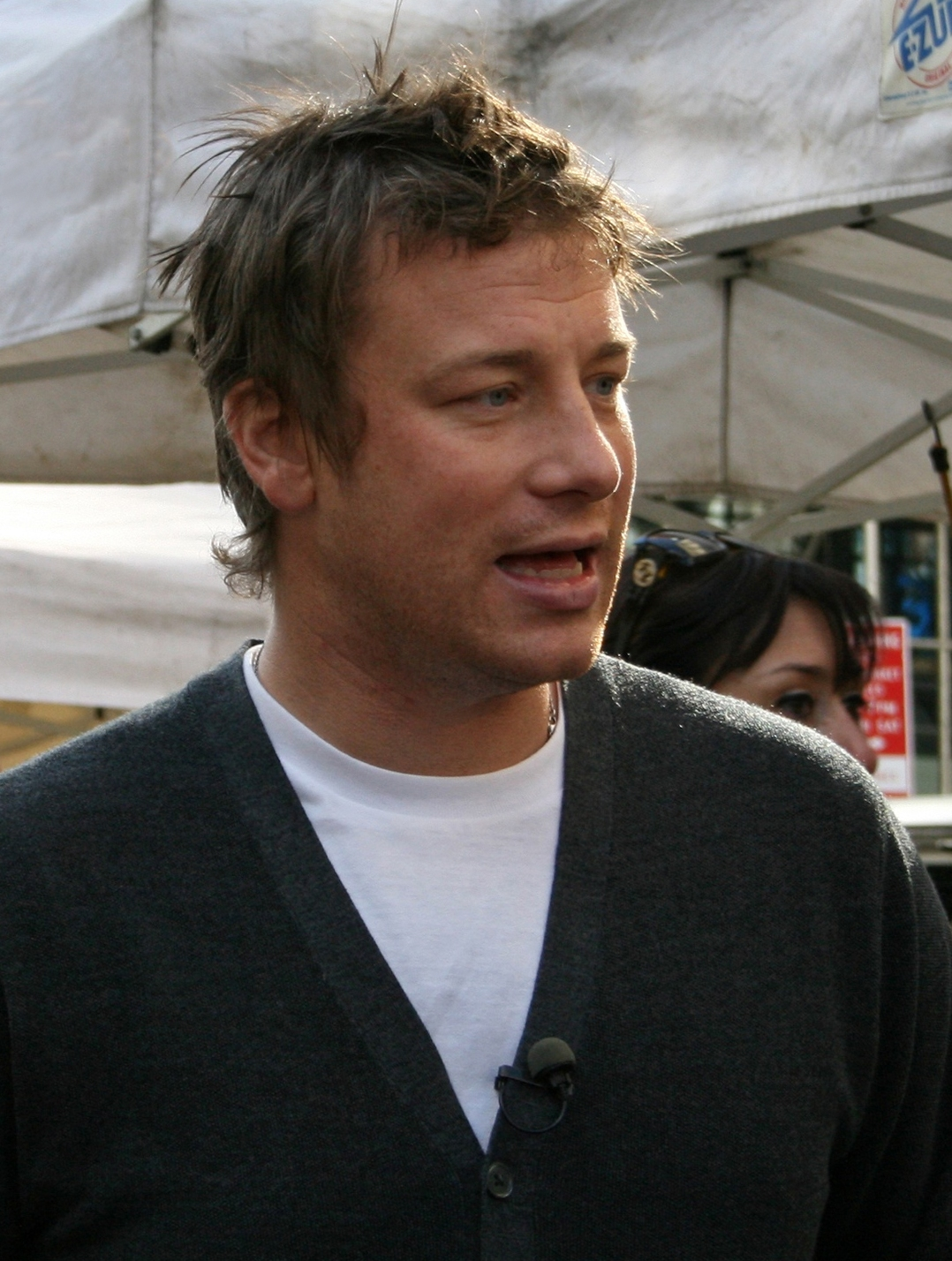
Jamie Oliver at the market.

- Jim O'Connor, hosted The Secret Life Of...
- Jamie Oliver, hosts or has hosted Naked Chef, Jamie at Home, Oliver's Twist, among others
- Anna Olson, hosts Bake with Anna Olson, Iron Chef on Iron Chef Canada; hosted/co-hosted Kitchen Equipped, Sugar, and Fresh with Anna Olson

== P ==
- Jesse Palmer, hosted Spring Baking Championship and Spring Baking Championship
- Lorraine Pascale, judge on Spring Baking Championship and Spring Baking Championship and mentor on Worst Bakers in America
- Jennifer Patterson, co-hosted of Two Fat Ladies
- Damaris Phillips, frequent judge on Guy's Grocery Games, hosted Southern at Heart and co-host Kids BBQ Championship
- Martin Picard, hosted of Chef Wild
- Greta Podleski, co-hosted of Eat, Shrink and Be Merry
- Janet Podleski, co-hosted of Eat, Shrink and Be Merry
- Wolfgang Puck, former Iron Chef on Iron Chef America
- Jay Purvis, co-hosted Kitchen Equipped

== R ==
- Rachael Ray, hosts 30 Minute Meals and has hosted $40 a Day, Inside Dish, Rachael Ray's Tasty Travels
- Gordon Ramsay
- Rob Rainford, hosted License to Grill
- Bobby Rivers, hosted Top 5
- David Rocco
- Carlo Rota
- Guy Rubino

== S ==
- Marcus Samuelsson, frequent judge on Chopped
- Aarón Sánchez, frequent judge on Chopped and co-star of Chefs vs. City
- Chris Santos, frequent judge on Chopped
- Anthony Sedlak, hosted The Main
- Gail Simmons, presenter on Iron Chef Canada
- Brad Smith, second host of Chopped Canada
- Michael Smith, was a frequent judge on Chopped Canada; hosted Chef at Home, Chef at Large, Chef Abroad, and The Inn Chef
- Aarti Sequeira, frequent judge on Guy's Grocery Games and hosted Arti Party
- Noah Starr co-hosted Ask Aida during season one as the tech guru
- Martha Stewart
- Marc Summers, original host of Unwrapped, occasional judge on Guy's Grocery Games, and was a co-host of Ultimate Recipe Showdown
- Michael Symon, competed on The Next Iron Chef, is an Iron Chef on Iron Chef America, and second host of Dinner: Impossible

== T ==
- Jet Tila, judge on many shows including Chopped, Beat Bobby Flay, Guy's Grocery Games, and more
- Corbin Tomaszeski, hosted Crash My Kitchen, judge on Dinner Party Wars, and one of the chefs on Restaurant Makeover
- Jacques Torres
- Ming Tsai, hosted East Meets West
- Anthea Turner, judge on Dinner Party Wars

== V ==
- Marcela Valladolid, frequent judge on Guy's Grocery Games, former co-host of The Kitchen, and was a rotating chef on Kitchen Sink

== Y ==
- Martin Yan, hosted Martin Yan's Chinatown
- Trisha Yearwood, Trisha's Southern Kitchen

== W ==
- Justin Warner, frequent judge on Guy's Grocery Games,

== Z ==
- Geoffrey Zakarian, hosts Cooks vs. Cons, co-hosts The Kitchen, rotating judge on Chopped, and more
- Julie Zwillich

== See also ==
- Food Network Canada
- List of programs broadcast by Food Network Canada
