= List of programs broadcast by Flavour Network =

This is a list of past and present programs airing on Flavour Network. It includes original programming, programming from Food Network, and programming acquired from other networks around the world.

== As Flavour Network (current) ==
=== Current ===
==== A-E ====
- Adam Richman Eats Britain
- Andi Oliver's Fabulous Feasts
- The Big Bake
- Beat Bobby Flay
- Big Burger Battle
- Billy and Dom Eat the World
- Carnival Eats
- Celebrity Family Food Battle
- Chasing Flavor with Carla Hall
- Cooking with the Stars
- Dinner Budget Showdown

==== F-J ====
- Fire Masters
- Gordon Ramsay's Food Stars
- The Great American Baking Show
- The Great American Recipe
- The Great British Baking Show: The Professionals
- Great British Menu
- Great Chocolate Showdown
- Gordon Ramsay's Food Stars
- Halloween Bakeshop
- Holiday Bakeshop
- Home Plate: New York with Marcus Samuelsson
- Junior Chef Showdown

==== K-O ====
- Kitchen Nightmares
- Morimoto's Sushi Master
- Neighbourhood Eats

==== P-T ====
- Pamela's Cooking With Love
- Project Bakeover
- Top Chef Canada

==== U-Z ====
- Worst Cooks in America
- You Gotta Eat Here!

== As Food Network Canada (original incarnation) ==
=== A-E ===
- Amy Schumer Learns to Cook
- The Baker Sisters
- Beat Bobby Flay
- Barefoot Contessa
- Brunch at Bobby's
- Burgers, Brew & 'Que
- Cake Hunters
- Cake Wars
- Cake Wars: Christmas
- Chef at Home
- Chef Dynasty: House of Fang
- Clash of the Grandmas
- Chopped
- Chopped: Canada
- Chopped Junior
- Cooks vs. Cons
- Cupcake Wars
- Cutthroat Kitchen
- David Rocco's Dolce Vita
- Dessert Games
- Diners, Drive-ins, and Dives
- Donut Showdown

=== F-J ===
- Food's Greatest Hits
- Food Factory
- Food Network Star
- Food Network Star Kids
- Food Safari
- Fresh with Anna Olson
- Giada Entertains
- Giada in Italy
- Ginormous Food
- Gordon Ramsay's Seasonal Specials
- Great Food Truck Race
- The Grill Dads
- Guy's Big Bite
- Guy's Grocery Games
- Guy's Family Road Trip
- Holiday Baking Championship
- I Hart Food
- Inspired with Anna Olson
- Iron Chef America
- Iron Chef Canada
- Just One Bite

=== K-O ===
- Kids Sweet Showdown
- Mystery Diners

=== P-T ===
- Patricia Heaton Parties
- The Pioneer Woman
- Restaurant: Impossible
- Restaurant Stakeout
- Sugar
- Sugar Showdown
- Top Chef: All-Stars L.A.

=== U-Z ===
- Valerie's Home Cooking
- Vegas Cakes
- Wall of Chefs
- Wall of Bakers
- Worst Bakers in America
- Worst Cooks in America

=== #-0 ===
- The 100 Mile Challenge
- 24 Hour Restaurant Battle
- 30 Minute Meals
- $40 a Day
- 5 Ingredient Fix

=== A-E ===
- Ace of Cakes
- Around the World in 80 Plates
- Ask Aida
- At the Table With...
- BBQ with Bobby Flay
- Behind the Bash
- The Best Thing I Ever Ate
- The Best Thing I Ever Made
- Big Daddy's House
- Buddy's Family Vacation
- Calling All Cooks
- Canadian Living Cooks
- Chef Academy
- Chef Abroad
- Chef at Home
- Chef at Large
- CheF*OFF
- Chef School
- Chefs vs. City
- Chef Wild
- Chefography
- Chocolate with Jacques Torres
- Christine Cushing: Cook With Me
- Christine Cushing Live
- Chuck's Day Off
- Cooking for Real
- Cook Like a Chef
- Cooking Live
- Cooking with Me
- A Cook's Tour
- Crash My Kitchen
- Crave
- Chef in Your Ear
- The Delinquent Gourmet
- Dinner: Impossible
- Dinner Party Wars
- Duff Till Dawn
- East Meets West
- Easy Entertaining with Michael Chiarello
- Eat, Shrink, and Be Merry
- Eat St.
- Emeril Live
- Essence of Emeril
- Everyday Exotic
- Everyday Italian
- Extreme Cuisine with Jeff Corwin

=== F-J ===
- The F Word
- Family Cook Off
- The Family Restaurant
- Feasting on Asphalt
- Fink
- Fixing Dinner
- Food Fighters
- Food 911
- Food Fantasy
- Food Hunter
- Food Jammers
- Food Network Challenge
- Forever Summer with Nigella
- Fresh and Wild
- French Food at Home
- From Spain With Love with Annie Sibonney
- Giada's Weekend Getaways
- Good Deal with Dave Lieberman
- Good Eats
- Gordon Elliott's Door Knock Dinners
- Gordon Ramsay's Ultimate Home Cooking
- The Great Canadian Cookbook
- Great Canadian Food Show
- Great Cocktails
- Giada at Home
- Glutton for Punishment
- Ham on the Street
- Heat Seekers
- The Heat with Mark McEwan
- Hell's Kitchen
- Honey, We're Killing the Kids
- Hot Off the Grill With Bobby Flay
- How'd That Get On My Plate?
- I Do, Let's Eat
- Ice Cold Cash
- In Search of Perfection
- The Incredible Food Race
- The Inn Chef
- Iron Chef
- Iron Chef America
- Jamie's 30-Minute Meals
- Jamie at Home
- Jamie's Great Italian Escape
- Jamie's Kitchen Australia
- Just One Bite

=== K-O ===
- Kid in a Candy Store
- Kitchen Crimes
- Kitchen Equipped
- Kitchen Nightmares
- Kylie Kwong: Simply Magic
- Licence to Grill
- Luau Beach BBQ Challenge
- Made to Order
- The Main
- Man-Made Food
- The Manic Organic
- Martin Yan's Chinatown
- Mexican Made Easy
- Molto Mario
- Nadia G's Bitchin' Kitchen
- New Classics With Chef Rob Feenie
- Nigella Bites
- Nigella Express
- Nigella Feasts
- The Opener
- Opening Soon
- Outrageous Food

=== P-T ===
- Party Dish
- Paula's Best Dishes
- Paula's Home Cooking
- Pitchin' In
- Private Chefs of Beverly Hills
- Quick & Easy
- Quick Fix Meals with Robin Miller
- Rachael Ray's Tasty Travels
- Rachael vs. Guy: Celebrity Cook-Off
- Rachael vs. Guy: Kids Cook-Off
- Ramsay's Kitchen Nightmares
- Recipe for Success
- Recipe to Riches
- Restaurant Makeover
- Restaurant Takeover
- Return to Tuscany
- Ricardo and Friends
- River Cottage Treatment
- Road Grill
- Road Tasted
- Sandwich King
- Sara's Secrets
- The Secret Life Of...
- Secrets of a Restaurant Chef
- Shopping With Chefs
- Simply Delicioso
- Southern at Heart
- Spice Goddess
- Sugar
- Sugar High
- Summer's Best
- The Supersizers Go...
- Surfing the Menu
- The Surreal Gourmet
- Sweet Baby James
- Sweet Genius
- Ten Dollar Dinners With Melissa D'Arabian
- The Thirsty Traveler
- This Food, That Wine
- Top 5 Restaurants
- Top Chef Just Desserts
- Top Chef Masters
- Tough Cookies
- Two Fat Ladies
- Tyler's Ultimate

=== U-Z ===
- Ultimate Recipe Showdown
- Unwrapped
- The Urban Peasant
- Wall of Bakers
- Wall of Chefs
- What Would Brian Boitano Make?
- The Wild Chef
- Will Work for Food
- World's Weirdest Restaurants

== See also ==
- List of programs broadcast by the Food Network
