= Ned Bell =

Canadian television personality (born 1973)

- Born: June 12, 1973 (age 52); Okanagan, British Columbia
- Education: Drubrulle French Culinary School
- Culinary career
- Cooking style: Farm-To-Table, Globally inspired, Locally created
- Television show(s): Cook Like a Chef ts Just Food Global B.C Weekend Monday news Saturday Chefs

Ned Bell (born June 12, 1973) is a Canadian television personality and executive chef. In 2008 he appeared in one episode of Cook Like a Chef, Its Just Food and on Global B.C. Weekend Monday News Saturday Chef segment.

== Early life ==
Born on June 12 in Okanagan, British Columbia, at the age of 12, Bell cooked for his younger siblings and that is what kick started his love for food and cooking. When he turned 15, he got his first job washing dishes. In 1991 he graduated high school from Magee Secondary School. Then he went on to culinary school at the Durbrulle French Culinary School and graduated in 1994.

== Career ==
After graduating college, Bell followed his instructor Rob Feenie and worked at Crocodile and Lumiere in Vancouver. Bell eventually became Lumiere's sous chef alongside Michael Jacob. He was awarded "Best Over All Rising Star" from Where (magazine) after opening Murrietas Grill in Calgary. In 2007 Bell returned home to become the chef at the Kelowna lakeside, and owner of Cabana Bar and Grill, which closed in 2011. Soon after, he ranked as one of Western Living Magazines "Top 40 Foodies Under 20". Bell moved on to work at the Four Seasons Hotel under YEW Kitchen, which launched a sustainable seafood concept in 2011. In his first year of working at the Four Seasons, guest covers, restaurant sales and catering revenue grew by 30 percent.

== Television ==
Bell also hosts and makes appearances on a few television shows. Its Just Food! is a show for cooks to learn techniques and different meals. From main dishes, side dishes and even desserts Bell and his co-host Julie Van Rosendale show at-home chefs back-to-basic examples and demonstrate the cooking basics. Cook Like a Chef was another show Ned made appearances on, which a studio-based television show that shows people how to cook, not what to cook. Chefs on this show focus on cooking tips and skills. Another show he appears on is Global BC Weekend Morning News chef segments.

In 2018, Bell competed on the second episode of Iron Chef Canada in which he battled his former mentor Rob Feenie in a battle of stone fruit.

== Awards ==
- "Best over all up coming star" by Where Magazine after opening Murrieta's Grille in Calgary.
- "Top 40 Foodies Under 20" by Western Living magazine after becoming the co-owner and chef at Cabana Bar and Grille in Kelowna.

== Personal life ==
Bell is a father of three sons, Fin, Max and Jet. He's married to publicist Kate Colley. Besides cooking he spends his free time with his family, cycling, golfing and running.
