= Pamela Anderson =

Canadian-American actress and model (born 1967)

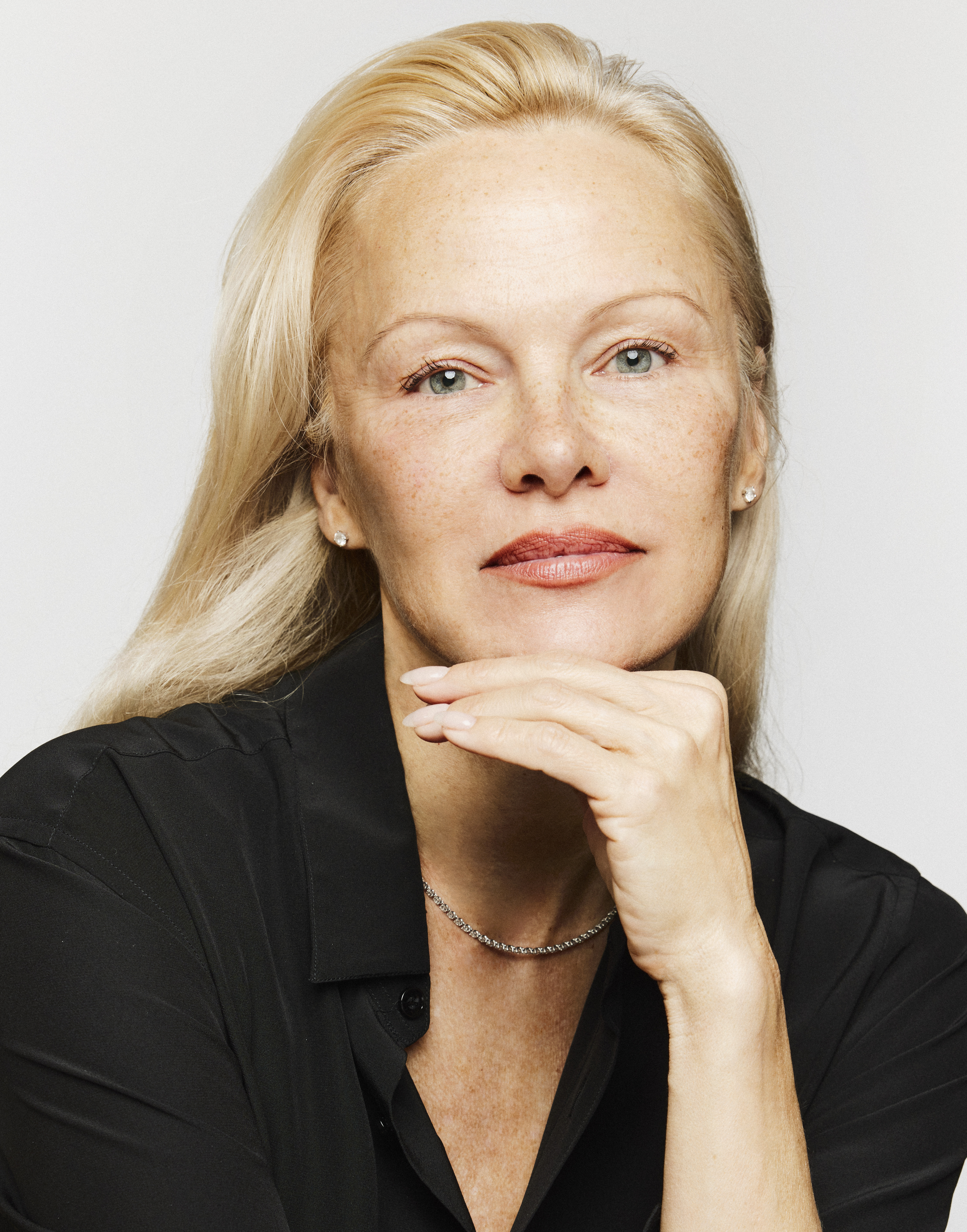
- Anderson in 2024
- Born: Pamela Denise Anderson; July 1, 1967 (age 59); Ladysmith, British Columbia, Canada
- Other name: Pamela Anderson Lee
- Citizenship: Canada; United States
- Education: Highland Secondary School
- Occupations: Actress; model; media personality; author
- Years active: 1989–present
- Spouses: Tommy Lee (m. 1995; div. 1998) Kid Rock (m. 2006; div. 2007) Rick Salomon (m. 2007; ann. 2008) (m. 2014; div. 2015) Dan Hayhurst (m. 2020; div. 2022)
- Partner: Adil Rami (2017–2019)
- Children: 2

Playboy centerfold appearance
- February 1990
- Preceded by: Peggy McIntaggart
- Succeeded by: Deborah Driggs

Personal details
- Height: 5 ft 7 in (1.70 m)
- Website: pamelaanderson.com

Pamela Denise Anderson (born July 1, 1967) is a Canadian-American actress, model and media personality. She came to public prominence after being selected as the February 1990 Playboy Playmate of the Month following her appearance on the cover of the magazine's October 1989 issue. She went on to make regular appearances on the magazine's cover, and holds the record for appearing on the most Playboy covers of any individual. Anderson became known to a wider audience for her role on the ABC sitcom Home Improvement (1991–1993), before gaining international recognition for her starring role as "C.J." Parker in the drama series Baywatch (1992–1997), which further cemented her status as a sex symbol.

In 1995, home videos of Anderson with her then-husband, Tommy Lee, were stolen, spliced together, and sold as a sex tape, which resulted in a legal fight and made her the subject of controversy. She starred as Vallery Irons in the syndicated series V.I.P. (1998–2002) and as Skyler Dayton in the Fox sitcom Stacked (2005–2006). She starred in the E! reality series Pam: Girl on the Loose (2008) and appeared as a contestant on the Dancing with the Stars franchise (2010–2012, 2018). In 2022, Anderson made her Broadway debut as Roxie Hart in the musical Chicago, and the following year, she was the subject of the Netflix documentary Pamela, a Love Story.

Anderson’s film credits include Barb Wire (1996), Scary Movie 3 (2003), Borat (2006), Baywatch (2017), City Hunter (2018), and The Naked Gun (2025). For starring in the independent drama film The Last Showgirl (2024), she received nominations for the Golden Globe Award and the Screen Actors Guild Award for Best Actress. Anderson has written several books. She has also supported various charitable causes, particularly animal rights and People for the Ethical Treatment of Animals (PETA), and endorses plant-based cooking.

== Early life and education ==
Anderson was born in Ladysmith, British Columbia, Canada, the daughter of Barry W. Anderson, a furnace repairman, and Carol (née Cawthorpe), a waitress. Her great-grandfather, Juho Hyytiäinen, was a Finnish native of Saarijärvi, and left the Grand Duchy of Finland for Canada in 1908 and changed his surname to Anderson. Pamela's grandfather Herman Anderson—a logger and a poet who believed in folklore, fairies, and trees that whispered secrets to each other—taught her to speak Finnish. Anderson has Volga German ancestry on her mother's side; her grandmother, Rose Friesen, ethnically German, was born in Russia in a Mennonite village and immigrated to Canada in 1901. Anderson received press coverage right after birth as a "Centennial Baby", being born on July 1, 1967, the 100th anniversary of Canada's official founding via the Constitution Act, 1867. She has a younger brother, Gerry (born 1971), an actor and producer who worked in some of her films and television shows.

When she was in grade 8, Anderson was a "scat soloist" for her middle school jazz band, where she played the saxophone. In 2025, she would draw on this talent for a solo in The Naked Gun. Anderson attended Highland Secondary School in Comox, British Columbia, where she played on the volleyball team, and graduated in 1985.

In 2014, Anderson discussed suffering sexual abuse as a child. She mentioned being molested by a female babysitter from ages 6 to 10, raped by a 25-year-old man when she was age 12, and gang-raped by her boyfriend and six of his friends when she was 14.

Anderson became a vegetarian in her early teens after her father went hunting and brought home a "bloodied deer." She eventually transitioned to a vegan diet in her twenties, and promotes the benefits of a plant-based diet.

== Career ==
=== 1980s and 1990s: Modelling and acting breakthrough ===
In 1988, Anderson moved to Vancouver and worked as a fitness instructor. The next year, she attended a BC Lions Canadian Football League game at the BC Place Stadium in Vancouver, where she was featured on the jumbotron while wearing a Labatt's Beer T-shirt. The brewing company hired Anderson briefly as a spokesmodel. Inspired by the event, her then-boyfriend Dan Ilicic produced a poster of her image, entitled the Blue Zone Girl.

Anderson was flown to Los Angeles for a photo shoot; she appeared as the cover girl on Playboy magazine's October 1989 issue. She subsequently moved to the United States, settling in LA to further pursue a modelling career. Playboy subsequently chose her as Playmate of the Month in their February 1990 issue, in which she appeared in the centrefold portrait. Anderson then elected to have breast implant surgery, increasing her bust size to 34D. She increased her bust size again, to 34DD, several years later. Her Playboy career spans 22 years, and she has appeared on more Playboy covers than any other model. She has also made numerous appearances in the publication's newsstand specials. Anderson wrote the foreword to the Playboy coffee table book Playboy's Greatest Covers. She had a minor role as Lisa, the original "Tool Time Girl", on the ABC comedy series Home Improvement.

Her breakthrough role was as C.J. Parker on Baywatch, which she played for five seasons between 1992 and 1997, making her one of the longest-serving cast members. The series has gained her popularity from international viewers and the character of Parker became one of her best-known roles, having been reenacted by multiple high-profile people since. Anderson was paid US$1,500 per episode during the first season. She reprised her role in a reunion movie, Baywatch: Hawaiian Wedding (2003), and also appeared as Parker in commercials for DirecTV in 2007. Anderson modelled for Outdoor Life and appeared on the cover of the magazine multiple times. In 1993, Anderson appeared in a music video "Can't Have Your Cake" by Vince Neil to promote his first solo album, Exposed.

In 1994, she was cast in her first starring film role, in Raw Justice, also known as Good Cop, Bad Cop, co-starring with Stacy Keach, David Keith, and Robert Hays. Under the alternate title, the film won the Bronze Award at the Worldfest-Charleston in the category for dramatic theatrical films. In 1996, she played Barbara Rose Kopetski in the film Barb Wire. The movie, a thinly veiled futuristic remake of Casablanca, was not a commercial success. During filming, she had barbed wire tattooed on her left upper arm instead of having it painted on by make-up artists every day, but she had it removed in 2016. In April 1997, she guest-hosted Saturday Night Live. She appeared on one of two covers for the September 1997 issue of Playboy. In September 1998, Anderson starred as Vallery Irons in the Sony Pictures Television syndicated action/comedy-drama series V.I.P. created by J. F. Lawton. The series had a successful four-year run. In 1999, she appeared as a man-eating giantess in the music video for "Miserable" by California alternative rock band Lit. She appeared on The Nanny as Fran Fine's rival, Heather Biblow.

=== 2000s: Rise to media prominence ===
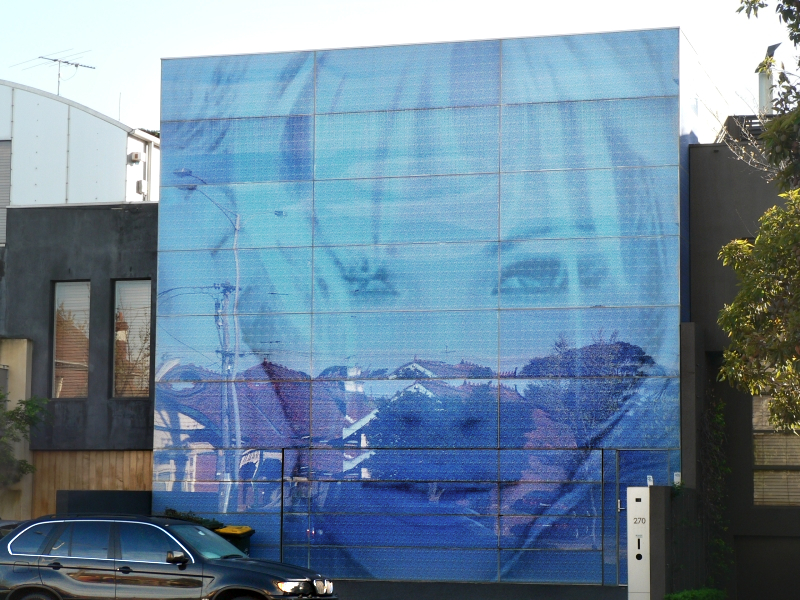
Sam Newman House featuring a large image of Anderson's face, 2006

Sam Newman House, a pop architecture building constructed in 2001 in St Kilda, Victoria, Australia, has a large image of Anderson's face. Sam Newman commissioned local architect Cassandra Fahey to design the building, and used the image with Anderson's permission. Permits were issued retroactively when it became a major local landmark and won the award for Best New Residential Building in the Victorian Architecture Awards. Later that year, Anderson played herself in the Miller Lite TV commercial "Pillow Fight", the sequel to the brand's earlier commercial "Catfight", with models Tanya Ballinger and Kitana Baker reprising their roles.

In May 2004, Anderson appeared nude on the cover of Playboy magazine. Later, she posed naked for Stuff and GQ magazines. Anderson was also featured on the cover of the fashion magazines W, British Marie Claire, Flare, and Elle Canada and in editorials for Russian Elle and V.

In 2004, she released the book Star, co-written by Eric Shaw Quinn, about a teenager trying to become famous. After this, she began touring the United States, signing autographs for fans nationwide. Her second book, Star Struck, released in 2005, is a thinly veiled look at her life with Tommy Lee and the trials of celebrity life. In 2005, Anderson starred in a new Fox comedy series Stacked as Skyler Dayton, a party girl who works at a bookstore. It was cancelled on May 18, 2006, after two seasons. On August 14, 2005, Comedy Central aired the Roast of Pamela Anderson.

In December 2005, NBC removed a video of Anderson pole dancing from the TV broadcast of Elton John's special "The Red Piano", saying that the footage was inappropriate for prime time. The video was shown on huge screens during the event, while John played "The Bitch Is Back".

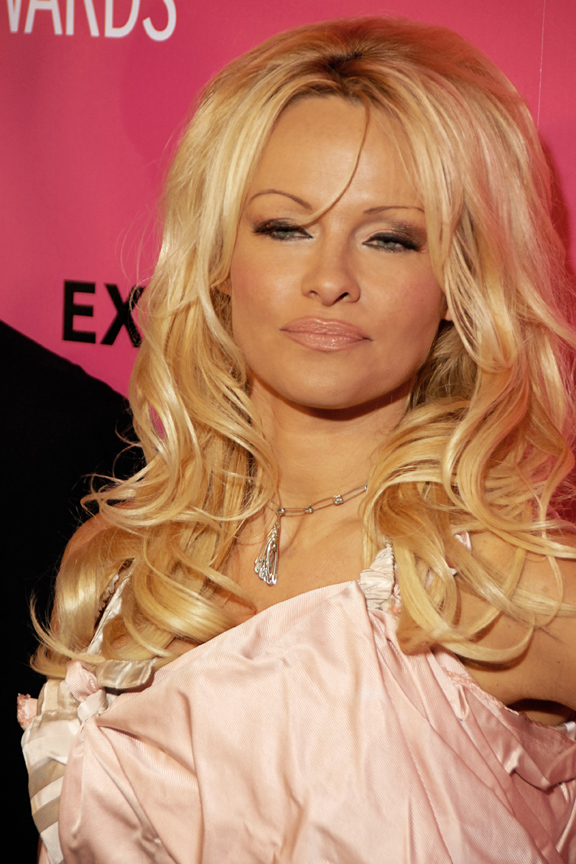
Anderson in 2009

In March 2006, Anderson received a star on Canada's Walk of Fame. In April 2006, she hosted Canada's Juno Awards, becoming the first non-singer and model to do so. She also appeared in the 2006 mockumentary Borat: Cultural Learnings of America for Make Benefit Glorious Nation of Kazakhstan, in which the title character becomes obsessed with her and plans to abduct and marry her. She appears as herself at a book-signing at the end of the film, confronted by Borat in a staged botched abduction.

Anderson performed on February 13–14, 2008, in a Valentine's Day strip-tease act at the Crazy Horse cabaret in Paris. Anderson then starred in the reality series Pam: Girl on the Loose.

In December 2009, Anderson guest-starred as Genie of the Lamp in the pantomime Aladdin at the New Wimbledon Theatre in Wimbledon, in southwest London. Anderson took over the role from comedian Ruby Wax, with former EastEnders actress Anita Dobson and comedian Paul O'Grady also booked for the role.

=== 2010s: Shift to reality television ===
In 2010, she appeared in the short film The Commuter directed by the McHenry Brothers and shot entirely on the Nokia N8 smartphone as promotion for the phone in the UK. Anderson was featured in a beach-themed editorial, shot by Mario Testino for Brazilian Vogue's June 2013 "Body Issue".

In November 2010, Anderson appeared on season 4 of Bigg Boss, the Indian version of the Big Brother television franchise. She stayed as a guest in the house for three days for a reported sum of Rs. 2.5 crores (approx US$550,000). Furthering her involvement in the franchise, Anderson took part in the 12th season of Big Brother in the United Kingdom in 2011. In 2012, she appeared as a Special Houseguest on the fourth season of VIP Brother, the celebrity spin-off of Big Brother in Bulgaria.

On Day 12 of the first season of Promi Big Brother in Germany, she entered the house, as a special guest star on the final day. David Hasselhoff, a former Baywatch co-star, was a contestant on Days 1 to 5.

Anderson was a contestant on the tenth season of Dancing with the Stars, partnered with professional dancer Damian Whitewood. The season premiered on March 22, 2010. Anderson was eliminated after seven weeks. She also took part in the 15th season all-star edition in 2012 with Tristan MacManus. Anderson and MacManus were eliminated in the first week of competition.

In May 2011, she was a contestant on the Bailando 2011 (Argentina), partnered with professional dancer Damian Whitewood. She left the competition after 4 weeks.

In 2013, Anderson appeared on the eighth series of the British reality TV show Dancing on Ice, partnered with former winner Matt Evers.

In 2018, she was a contestant on the ninth season of French Dancing with the Stars. The season premiered on September 29, 2018. Anderson was eliminated on November 8, 2018. She served as an executive producer for the 2018 plant-based documentary The Game Changers, along with James Cameron, Arnold Schwarzenegger, and Jackie Chan.

=== 2020s: Critical resurgence and plant-based cooking ===
Anderson made her Broadway debut playing Roxie Hart in the Broadway production of Chicago for eight weeks from April 12, 2022 to June 5, 2022 (her first time performing since 2019). That same year, she expanded her presence on television with the reality series Pamela's Garden of Eden, which premiered in November 2022. The show followed Anderson as she left her Hollywood life behind to return to her roots on her family's Vancouver Island property, where she undertook the extensive restoration of her grandmother's legacy estate and embraced sustainable design and gardening.

The series proved popular enough to return for a second season in 2023, in which Anderson continued the renovation but also assisted her sons, Brandon and Dylan, with transforming their newly purchased home in Los Angeles, giving viewers a deeper look at her life, design philosophy, and family dynamics. Anderson described the second season as a more authentic reflection of where she is in life, emphasizing sustainability and her growing sense of self-acceptance.

A few months later in 2023, Netflix released a documentary directed by Ryan White on her life from childhood to the 2022 appearance in Chicago, called Pamela, a Love Story. It was also produced by her son Brandon Thomas Lee, who received his first Primetime Emmy Award nomination as a producer in the 2023 Outstanding Documentary or Nonfiction Special category for his work on the film. Its release coincided with Anderson's autobiography, Love, Pamela, which debuted at number two on The New York Times Best Seller list within its first week of release.

"I always say the win is in the work...I got to do something I really love, and I needed to do that for my soul."

— Anderson on not being nominated for an Academy Award for The Last Showgirl

After watching Pamela, a Love Story, Gia Coppola expressed interested in casting Anderson as the lead character Shelly in her 2024 drama film The Last Showgirl. She sent the script to Anderson's then-agent who turned it down within the hour without letting Anderson know about it. Coppola then reached out to Anderson's son Brandon through mutual friends, who passed it along to his mother. While Anderson had given up on acting by this point, she accepted the role. She was officially cast in February 2024, starring alongside Jamie Lee Curtis, Dave Bautista, Brenda Song, Kiernan Shipka and Billie Lourd. The film premiered at the Toronto International Film Festival in September 2024, with Anderson calling it "the role I have been waiting for my entire career". Caryn James of the BBC called Anderson "a revelation" and wrote: "The low-key devastation Anderson has captured is the real acting triumph." David Rooney of The Hollywood Reporter said Anderson's "transformative performance is undeniably affecting, offering illuminating insights into both the character and the actress playing her, who has had to struggle to be taken seriously. This role should mark a turning point on that front." Anderson received a nomination for a Golden Globe Award for Best Actress in a Motion Picture – Drama for her performance in the film, marking her first Golden Globe Award nomination and the first major industry acting nomination in her career. She was also nominated for the Screen Actors Guild Award for Outstanding Performance by a Female Actor in a Leading Role.

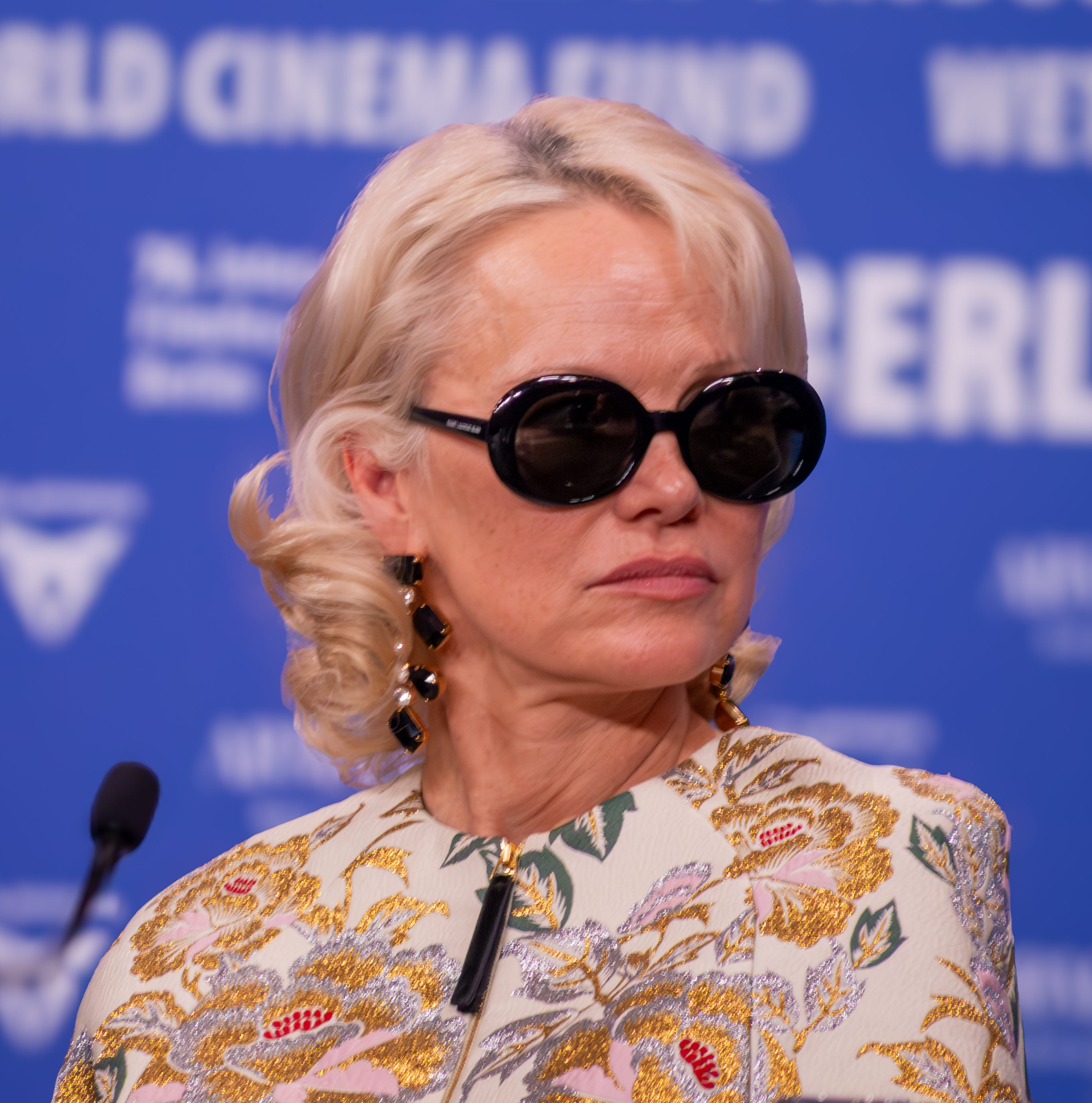
Anderson at the Rosebush Pruning premiere in the 76th Berlin International Film Festival

Anderson appeared in the November 12, 2024 episode of the Criterion Closet, where she discussed her lifelong interest in cinema. The films she selected included Jean-Luc Godard's Breathless, David Lynch's Blue Velvet, Federico Fellini's La Strada, and David Lean's Summertime. In 2025, Anderson appeared in the Williamstown Theatre Festival's production of Camino Real (Tennessee Williams), and is slated to appear in Karim Aïnouz's Rosebush Pruning.

In the early 1990s, Anderson was offered the role of Tanya Peters in the 1994 film, Naked Gun 33 1/3: The Final Insult, but turned it down due to scheduling conflicts (the role eventually went to Anna Nicole Smith). Over thirty years later, Anderson co-starred in the 2025 legacy sequel, The Naked Gun (Beth Davenport) alongside Liam Neeson (Lt. Frank Drebin Jr.)

Anderson's 2024 plant-based cookbook I Love You: Recipes From the Heart, was nominated for a 2025 James Beard Award. The work of her photographer, Ditte Isager, was recognized in the "Media: Visuals" category. Actress and talk show host Drew Barrymore has noted that "as a cookbook collector" she found I Love You: Recipes From the Heart to be "the most beautiful cookbook I've ever seen - it is stunning." VegNews listed I Love You: Recipes From the Heart as one of "The Best Vegan Cookbooks of 2024," Chowhound referred to it one of the "15 Best Vegetarian Cookbooks Of 2024," and SHE Media listed Anderson as one of "22 Celebrity Moms Whose Cookbooks Will Solve Your Dinner Problems." During her interview with Anderson for Elle, Martha Stewart stated that I Love You: Recipes From the Heart is "very nicely done," and that Anderson drew from French cuisine "in the most simple, beautiful way." In addition, after testing a salad recipe in the book, Jessica Wrubel wrote in Parade magazine that she was "completely smitten with I Love You as a whole. Pamela's journey into this softer, more personal territory—whether through her recipes or her stories—makes the book feel like an extension of her heart. If you've ever doubted the staying power of Pamela Anderson's influence, let this cookbook—and this salad—prove you wrong."

In 2025, she began hosting Pamela's Cooking with Love (a plant-based cooking show), when it debuted on Canada's Flavour Network. The show was greenlit in February 2023.

== Activism ==
=== Animal rights ===
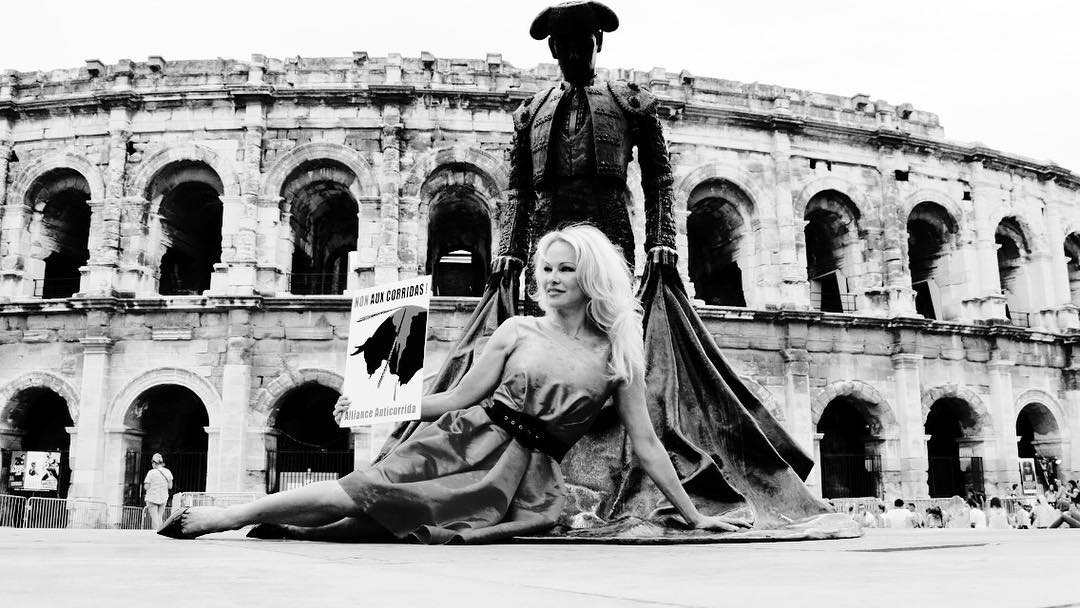
Anderson in front of the Arena of Nîmes in public campaign against bullfights, July 2017

Anderson advocates for animal rights, and is an active member of the animal protection organization People for the Ethical Treatment of Animals (PETA).

In 2010, she posed for a PETA ad wearing a bikini with sections drawn on her body dividing it into ribs, rump, shoulder, etc., like a diagram of meat cuts; the ad's tagline was "All Animals Have the Same Parts". The ad was banned in Montreal, Quebec on grounds that it was sexist. Anderson retorted, "In a city that is known for its exotic dancing and for being progressive and edgy, how sad that a woman would be banned from using her own body in a political protest over the suffering of cows and chickens. In some parts of the world, women are forced to cover their whole bodies with burqas – is that next? I didn't think that Canada would be so puritanical."

In 2012, she became a company spokesperson for FrogAds, Inc., a company that used her as part of a media campaign in a pool operation of which she was unaware.

In February 2014, she stripped for a Valentine's Day-themed ad for PETA, urging dog lovers to cuddle up with their pets during winter.

On July 8, 2015, Anderson wrote to Vladimir Putin to save whales. On December 15, 2015, Anderson, representing the International Fund for Animal Welfare (IFAW), met with top Kremlin officials regarding animals rights in Russia. On December 15, 2016, Anderson and IFAW officials met with Kremlin officials to discuss animal welfare and conservation.

In December 2015, Anderson, a close friend of Sea Shepherd Conservation Society founder Paul Watson and a long-time supporter and advisory board member, became a full board member in order to further its efforts in opposing the hunting of whales.

=== Anti-pornography ===
In a 2008 interview with The Guardian, Anderson said that because she is aware of her Finnish ancestry, she considered moving to Finland and opening a strip club called "Lapland". However, she has since become critical of pornography.

In 2016, she co-authored a viral opinion article in The Wall Street Journal with Orthodox rabbi Shmuley Boteach, in which they called online pornography a "public hazard of unprecedented seriousness." The two called for a "sensual revolution" to replace "pornography with eroticism, the alloying of sex with love, of physicality with personality, of the body's mechanics with imagination, of orgasmic release with binding relationships." They later gave a joint lecture at Oxford University to over 1,000 people. Boteach observed: "It can be intimidating to talk about pornography and eroticism alongside an international sex symbol, but I think Pamela has handled it extremely well." The two also wrote a book together, Lust for Love (2018), about how meaningful, passionate sex has been declining, and called for a new sensual revolution that emphasizes partners connecting in the bedroom.

=== Julian Assange ===
In December 2016, in a statement to People magazine, Anderson called WikiLeaks founder Julian Assange a "hero". She stated that he had done everyone "a great service" and that "[e]veryone in the world has benefited because of WikiLeaks," while decrying how "elaborate plots against him and made up sexual allegations could result in him being extradited to the US – where he would not be treated fairly – because of his exposure of truths." In April 2019, Anderson expressed anger on Twitter at Assange's expulsion from Ecuador's London embassy. In May 2019, Anderson visited Assange in Belmarsh prison with Kristinn Hrafnsson, and said she believed Assange to be innocent, saying, "He is a good man, he is an incredible person. I love him, I can't imagine what he has been going through."

In October 2019, Anderson announced she would be travelling to Australia in November 2019 to challenge Australian Prime Minister Scott Morrison to stand up for Assange. In her announcement, she referenced the 'disparaging remarks' he made about her in 2018 and challenged him to debate the matter "in front of the Australian people." She also wrote another letter to Morrison asking him to use his influence to secure Assange's release. Morrison replied with a letter, saying that his government would respect Britain's judicial process and Assange would not receive any special help. In the text of a speech she had intended to give at Parliament House, Canberra, Anderson said that Assange was suffering "psychological torture" in jail and that "every moment he is in there, he is in danger".

On January 18, 2021, Anderson spoke on the Fox News show Tucker Carlson Tonight, asking President Donald Trump to pardon Assange.

=== Additional activism ===
In March 2005, Anderson became a spokesperson for MAC Cosmetics's MAC AIDS Fund, which helped people affected by AIDS and HIV. After becoming the official spokesmodel, Anderson raised money during Toronto, Tokyo, Dublin, and Athens events. Anderson became the celebrity spokesperson for the American Liver Foundation and served as the Grand Marshal of the SOS motorcycle ride fundraiser.

In 2009, Anderson wrote an open letter to President Barack Obama urging the legalization of cannabis.

In November 2016, Anderson starred in a video public service announcement produced by the National Limousine Association and the National Sexual Violence Resource Center as part of the Ride Responsibly initiative, titled The Driving Game, which aimed to shed light on the lack of universal driver regulations in the private ground transportation industry.

Anderson once again starred in a video public service announcement produced by the National Limousine Association in January 2018, this time in partnership with Promoting Awareness | Victim Empowerment (PAVE), as part of the Ride Responsibly initiative. The video titled The Signs pushes for passenger safety and universal driver regulations in the private ground transportation industry.

In the 2019 Canadian federal election, she endorsed the Green Party of Canada.

After supporting the yellow vests movement, Anderson attended a meeting of the European Spring with Yanis Varoufakis and Benoît Hamon. She appeared as a supporter on election posters of the German DiEM25 campaign in the run-up to the 2019 European Parliament elections.

== Personal life ==
=== Homes and family ===
Anderson has two sons from her first marriage to Tommy Lee, Brandon Thomas (born in 1996) and Dylan Jagger (born in 1997). She became a naturalized citizen of the United States in 2004 while retaining her Canadian citizenship. After moving to California in 1989, Anderson felt that it was important to become an American citizen in order to vote and one day petition to bring her parents to the U.S. and care for them when they were older.

Anderson purchased a beach home in Malibu, California for $1.8 million in 2001 and attempted to sell it in 2013 for $7.75 million, but later took it off the market. She previously lived in a mansion in Cassis, in the commune of Marseille, France.

During the COVID-19 pandemic, her childhood home in Canada became her permanent residence, and she sold her Malibu home. As of 2024 she lives with her dogs in Ladysmith on Vancouver Island, British Columbia, and has a vegetable farm, Arcady.

=== Marriages and relationships ===
Anderson has been married five times. She married her first husband, Tommy Lee, drummer of Mötley Crüe, on February 19, 1995, after knowing him for only four days. They married on a beach, with Anderson in a white bikini and Lee in boardshorts. Lee was later sentenced to six months in the Los Angeles County Jail for spousal abuse after assaulting Anderson, and they divorced in 1998. A long custody dispute over their sons followed, and was finalized when they were granted joint custody in October 2002. In March 2002, Anderson publicly stated that she had contracted hepatitis C by sharing tattoo needles with Lee, and began writing a regular column for Jane magazine. In October 2003, Anderson jokingly said on Howard Stern's radio show that she did not expect to live more than 10 or 15 years, but this was taken seriously by many websites and tabloids. By 2015 Anderson had been cured of hepatitis C.

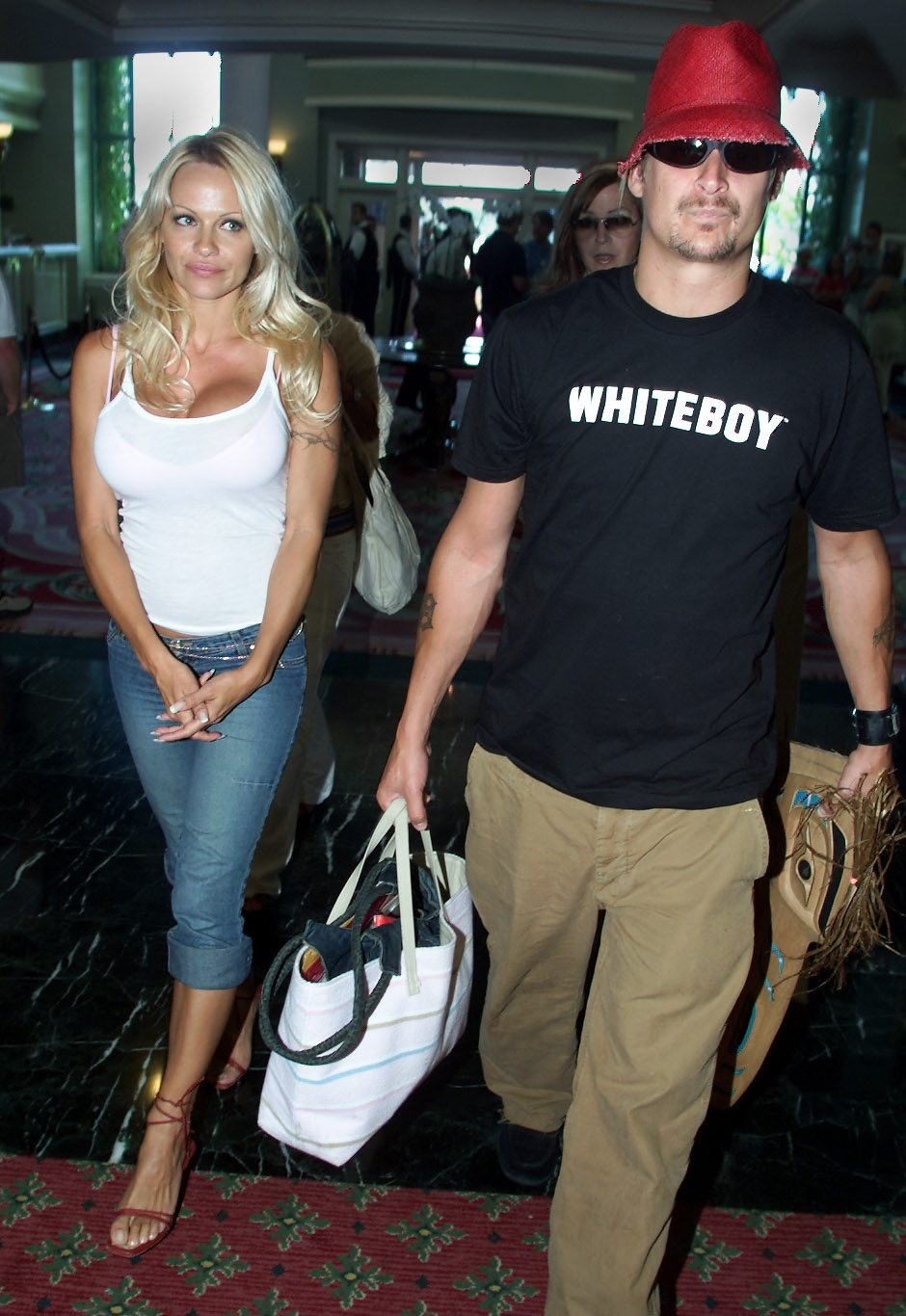
Anderson and Kid Rock in 2003

Anderson later married Kid Rock, but after a miscarriage while in Vancouver shooting a new film, Blonde and Blonder, Anderson filed for divorce in Los Angeles County Superior Court, citing irreconcilable differences.

In September 2007, Anderson stated on The Ellen DeGeneres Show that she was engaged, and on September 29, Anderson and Rick Salomon applied for a marriage license in Las Vegas. On October 6, 2007, Anderson married Salomon in a small wedding ceremony at The Mirage, between her two nightly appearances at the Planet Hollywood Resort and Casino in Hans Klok's magic show. The couple separated on December 13, and on February 22, 2008, Anderson requested through the courts that the marriage be annulled, citing fraud. In October 2013, Anderson stated on The Ellen DeGeneres Show that she and Salomon were "friends with benefits". In January 2014, she announced that she had remarried Salomon on an unspecified date. Anderson filed for divorce from Salomon in February 2015. The divorce was finalized on April 29, 2015.

She was in a relationship with French soccer player Adil Rami from 2017 to 2019.

On December 24, 2020, Anderson married Dan Hayhurst, her bodyguard. On January 21, 2022, she announced that she had filed for divorce and split with Hayhurst.

=== Stolen home videos ===
In 1995, personal home videos of Anderson with her then-husband Tommy Lee recorded on a houseboat on Lake Mead were stolen and spliced together. They were then sold as a sex tape, which resulted in a legal fight and made her the subject of controversy. Anderson sued the video distribution company, Internet Entertainment Group, who posted the video on their website ClubLove in November 1997. Anderson was pregnant during the trial and, fearful of the extreme stress causing harm to her pregnancy, dismissed the case. The company began making the tape available to subscribers to its websites again, resulting in triple the normal traffic on the sites. In the 2023 Netflix documentary Pamela, a Love Story, Anderson said there was no confidential agreement over releasing rights to the video, and that she chose not to monetize it.

The story of the tape was portrayed in the Hulu 2022 miniseries Pam & Tommy. In Pamela, a Love Story, Anderson said that she was not consulted about the production of the series. Critics, journalists, and academics posited that the series was profiting from Anderson's trauma and likely doing further harm to her. Pamela, a Love Story verified those claims, in Anderson's own words. Producers of the series were able to develop the series without her participation, permission, or consent by optioning the rights to an article published by Rolling Stone in 2014. Some critics felt that this was a similar violation of privacy that mirrored the tape originally being stolen and distributed without Anderson's and Lee's consent.

== Bibliography ==
Main author

- Anderson, Pamela (2004). Star: A Novel. Atria Books. ISBN 9780743493727.
- Anderson, Pamela (2005). Star Struck. Atria Books. ISBN 9780743492836.
- Anderson, Pamela (2023). Love, Pamela. HarperCollins. ISBN 978-0-06-322658-6.
- Anderson, Pamela (2024). I Love You: Recipes from the Heart (A Cookbook). Voracious. ISBN 978-0316573481.

Co-authored

- Ali, Tariq; Kunstler, Margaret, eds. (October 2019). In Defense of Julian Assange. OR Books, LLC. ISBN 978-1-68219-221-4. (Note: Contributors: Pamela Anderson, Julian Assange, Renata Avila, Katrin Axelsson, Franco "Bifo" Berardi, Sally Burch, Noam Chomsky, Patrick Cockburn, Naomi Colvin, The Courage Foundation, Mark Curtis, Daniel Ellsberg, Teresa Forcades i Vila, Charles Glass, Kevin Gosztola, Serge Halimi, Nozomi Hayase, Chris Hedges, Srećko Horvat, Caitlin Johnstone, Margaret Kimberley, Geoffroy de Lagasnerie, Lisa Longstaff, Alan MacLeod, Stefania Maurizi, Craig Murray, Fidel Narváez, John C. O'Day, John Pilger, Jesselyn Radack, Michael Ratner, Angela Richter, Geoffrey Robertson, Jennifer Robinson, Matt Taibbi, Natalia Viana, Ai Weiwei, Vivienne Westwood and Slavoj Žižek.)
- Lust for Love: Rekindling Intimacy and Passion in Your Relationship (co-writer with Shmuley Boteach) (2018)
- Anderson, Pamela; Dunlavey, Emma; Mazzucco, Raphael (September 2015). Raw. BenBella Books. ISBN 978-1-942952-07-7.
- Lee, Pamela A.; Gold, Todd (June 1998). Pamdemonium. Grand Central Publishing. ISBN 978-0-446-60668-4.

== See also ==
- List of Flavour Network personalities
- List of programs broadcast by Flavour Network
- List of vegan and plant-based media

== Notes ==
Peggy McIntaggart	Pamela Anderson	Deborah Driggs	Lisa Matthews	Tina Bockrath	Bonnie Marino
Jacqueline Sheen	Melissa Evridge	Kerri Kendall	Brittany York	Lorraine Olivia	Morgan Fox
