= Geoffrey Zakarian =

Armenian-American celebrity chef

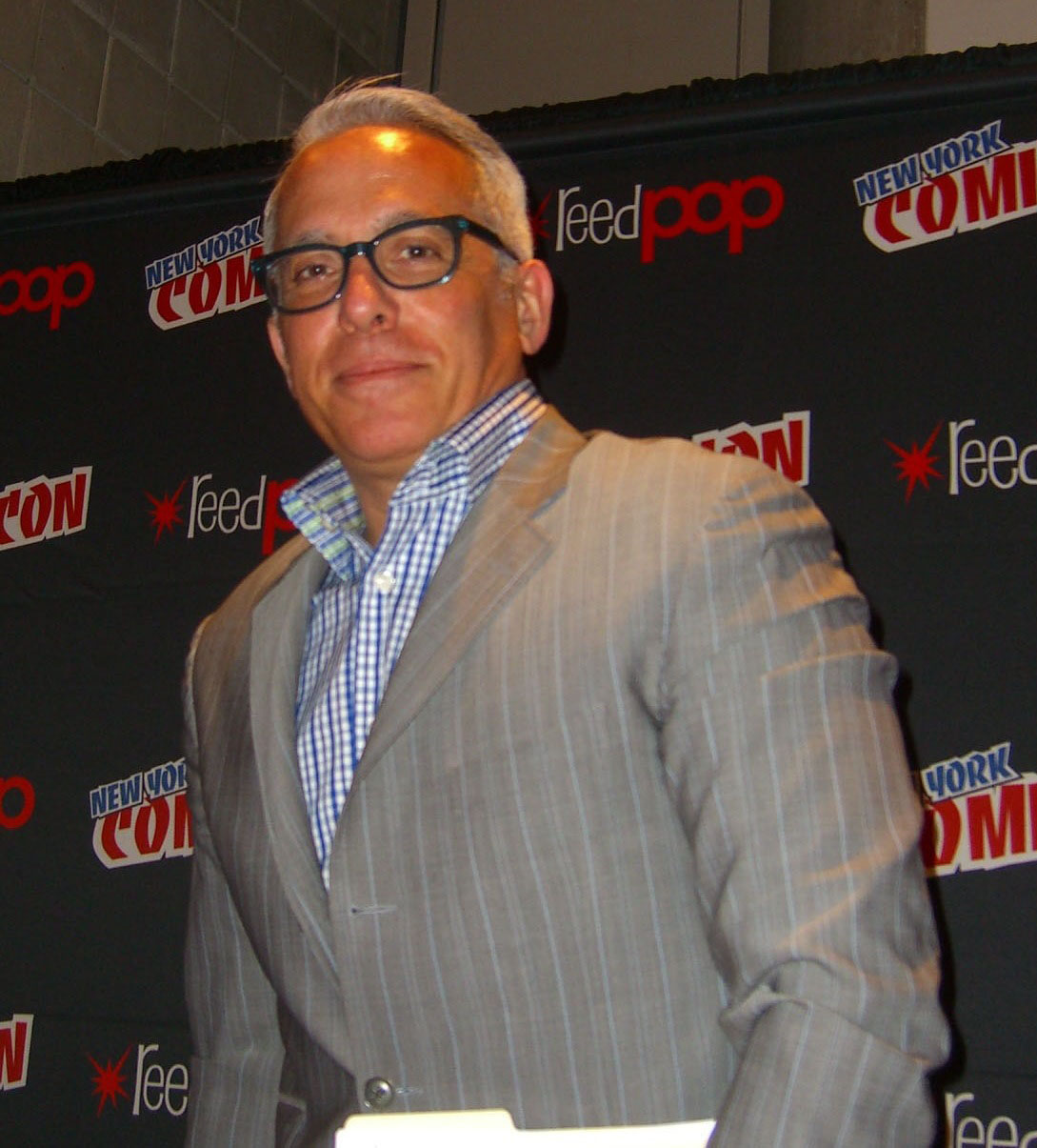
- Zakarian at the 2012 New York Comic Con
- Born: July 25, 1959 (age 67); Worcester, Massachusetts, U.S.
- Education: Worcester State University; Culinary Institute of America
- Spouse: Margaret Anne Williams (m. 2005)
- Children: 3
- Culinary career
- Television shows
- Chopped; Chopped Junior; Cooks vs. Cons; The Kitchen; Kitchen Sink; Top 5 Restaurants
- Website: geoffreyzakarian.com

Geoffrey Zakarian (born July 25, 1959) is an American chef, restaurateur, television personality, and author. He is the executive chef of several restaurants in New York City, Atlantic City, and Miami. He is featured on several television shows on the Food Network, including Chopped and The Next Iron Chef. In 2011, on The Next Iron Chef he won an opportunity to join Iron Chef America.

== Early life and education ==
Zakarian was born July 25, 1959, in Worcester, Massachusetts to an Armenian-American father, musician George Zakarian, and a Polish-American mother, Viola (née Hekowicz). Zakarian has a sister, Virginia, and a brother, George. Geoffrey graduated from Burncoat High School in 1977. He earned a degree in economics from Worcester State University and then went to France, where he decided to be a chef.

He began his culinary career with an associate degree from the Culinary Institute of America in Hyde Park, New York. As an apprentice chef, he began his work under chef Daniel Boulud at Le Cirque, where he was named a "Chef de Cuisine" from 1982 to 1987.

== Career ==
In 1990, at 31 years old, he became the executive chef in the Royalton Hotel in midtown Manhattan. William Grimes of The New York Times described Zakarian as "the reason that 44 in the Royalton Hotel was always a lot better than it needed to be" in 2001. Previously in 1992, 44 had received only two stars from New York Times columnist Bryan Miller.

In 1996, he was hired to oversee Old Navy's ill-fated coffee bar and coffee cart division with David Brody of Z100 WHTZ. He then went on to work for the Blue Door of the Delano Hotel in South Beach in Miami Beach, Florida. In 1998, he became the executive chef at Patroon in Manhattan, which was awarded three stars (excellent) by New York Times critic Ruth Reichl. In the spring of 2000, Zakarian worked with Alain Passard, a renowned French chef at the three-Michelin star restaurant Arpège in Paris.

In the 2000s, Zakarian owned two Manhattan restaurants, Town and Country, both of which were rated three stars by The New York Times. The town was located on the East Side of midtown Manhattan in the Chambers Hotel and opened in spring 2001, but closed in 2009. Country was located in the James New York – NoMad near Madison Square Park and opened in 2005 but closed in 2008. The restaurant has earned a Michelin Star. Zakarian is now a consultant at the Water Club in Atlantic City and executive chef at the Lamb's Club in New York City. The Lamb's Club restaurant is not connected in any way to the historical theatre club The Lambs (known as The Lambs Club since 1874). In the spring of 2006, Zakarian released his first book, Geoffrey Zakarian's Town / Country. It was quoted as being "one of the best (cookbooks) of 2006" by The New York Times columnist Amanda Hesser. The book features 150 recipes for family, friends, and "Life Around the Table".

He is chairman of the City Harvest Food Council, a food rescue organization dedicated to fighting hunger in New York City.

His style is described as "modern" with roots in French cuisine, or as he describes it, "dynamic American".

== Legal issues ==
In spring 2011, Zakarian filed for personal bankruptcy in response to a class action lawsuit filed against him by former employees. The employees sued for back pay and alleged that he violated labor laws. Two of his partners in the related restaurant supported the workers' claims, but his publicist denied the claims. The matter was settled out of court.

In July 2015, Zakarian withdrew from a planned restaurant called The National in the Trump International Hotel Washington, D.C. after Donald Trump’s comments about illegal immigrants. Zakarian responded by saying Trump's statements "do not in any way align with my personal core values". Zakarian was expected to lose a $500,000 lease deposit. Trump sued Zakarian in August 2015 for a sum "in excess of $10 million" claiming the chef violated their contractual agreement, causing lost rent and other damages. The matter was settled out of court in April 2017.

== Television ==
He has appeared numerous times on Food Network's Chopped series as a judge with fellow restaurateurs Scott Conant, Chris Santos, Aarón Sánchez, Amanda Freitag, Marcus Samuelsson, Marc Murphy, Maneet Chauhan, and Alex Guarnaschelli since the show began. He appeared in the Food Network's series 24 Hour Restaurant Battle, also as a judge. He has been on Top Chef as a judge and appeared on Hell's Kitchen.

Zakarian competed as a challenger on Iron Chef America in May 2010 facing Masaharu Morimoto and lost with a score of 57 to 43. Zakarian was named the winner of The Next Iron Chef in December 2011, defeating Elizabeth Falkner in the season finale. In January 2014, he became a co-host on the Food Network's series The Kitchen along with Jeff Mauro, Katie Lee, Marcela Valladolid, and Sunny Anderson. Zakarian has also appeared on Cutthroat Kitchen as a judge ("Well, Hot Clam!") and a contestant ("Judging Judges"). In 2016, he began hosting the Food Network series Cooks vs. Cons; on the show, judges try to determine if a winning dish was made by a professional chef or a home cook. Zakarian competed on Wildcard Kitchen in 2025 for an episode where Chopped judges competed.

== Personal life ==
Zakarian married Margaret Anne Williams, a marketing executive, in 2005. They have three children. He was previously married to Heather Karaman for approximately ten years.
