= Lynn Crawford =

Canadian chef and television personality

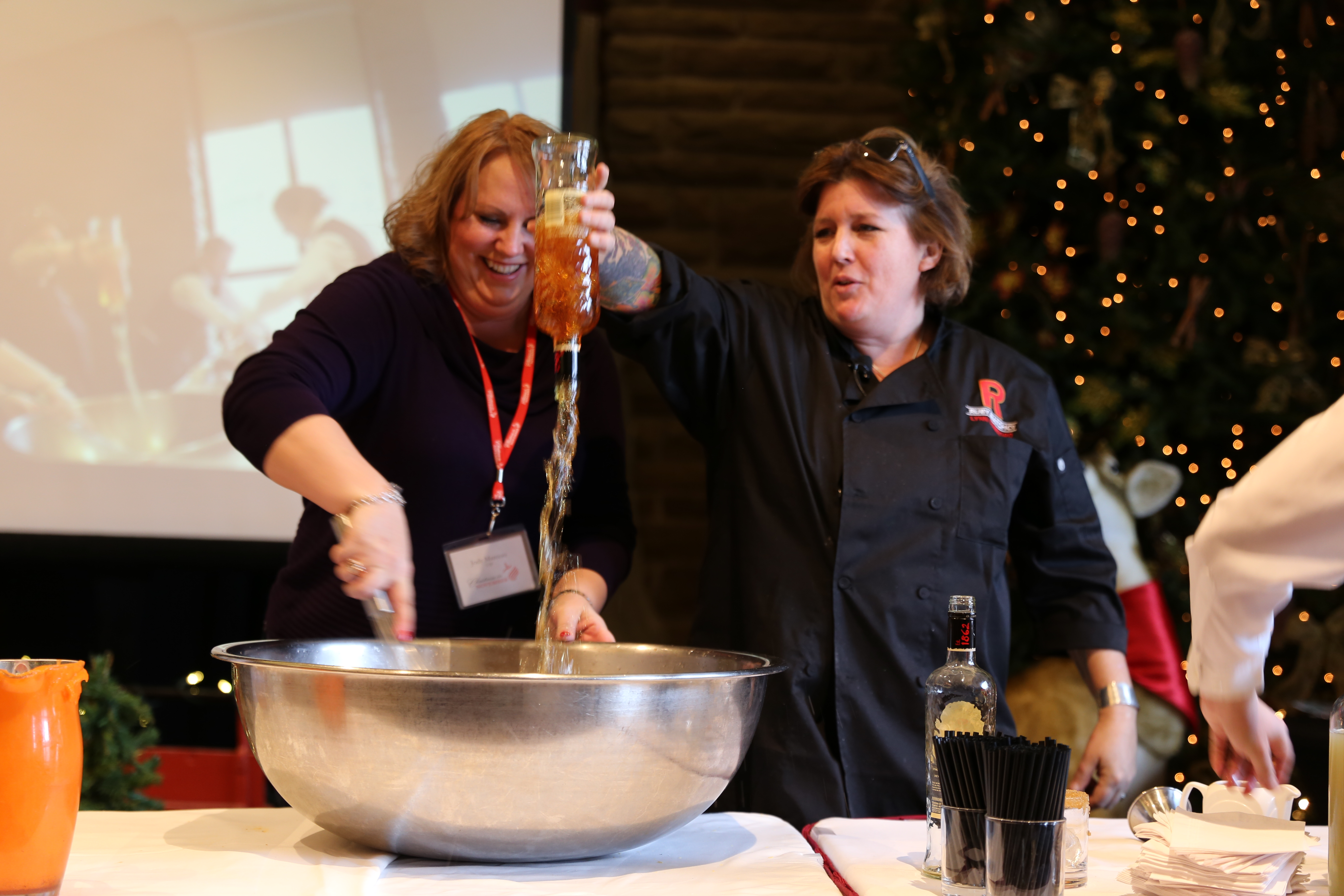
- Crawford (right) in 2014
- Born: July 18, 1964 (age 62); Toronto, Ontario
- Education: George Brown College
- Spouse: Lora Kirk
- Culinary career
- Previous restaurants
- Ruby Watchco, Toronto (2010–2021)
- Television shows
- Restaurant Makeover (2005–2008) * Pitchin' In (2010–2014) * Iron Chef Canada (2018–present)

Lynn Crawford (born July 18, 1964) is a Canadian chef and television personality. She is known for her appearances on the Food Network show Restaurant Makeover, which is seen in over 16 countries worldwide.

== Biography ==
Lynn Crawford was born July 18, 1964, in Toronto, Ontario, Canada. She trained at George Brown College in Toronto. She apprenticed under Alice Waters.

She was formerly the executive chef at the Four Seasons in Toronto and the former executive chef of the Four Seasons in New York.

From 2010 until 2021, she co-founded and co-owned, alongside Lora Kirk, the table d’hôte restaurant Ruby Watchco in Toronto.

== Television appearances ==
She appeared on the Food Network's Iron Chef America (the third chef from Canada to do so), in a battle with Iron Chef Bobby Flay. The episode first aired on March 7, 2007, with peanut as the theme ingredient. Crawford lost the battle to Chef Flay.

In 2010, Crawford debuted a Food Network Canada series entitled Pitchin' In, in which she goes out to take on the challenge of getting the freshest and best ingredients. In the same year she launched Ruby Watchco, a table d'hôte restaurant, in Toronto's Riverside neighbourhood. In 2010, she was nominated for a Gemini Award in the Best Host in a Lifestyle/Practical Information, or Performing Arts Program or Series category for the Pitchin' In shrimp episode. In 2014, Crawford was nominated for Canadian Screen Award in the category of Lifestyle Program or Series for Pitchin In.

In 2013, Crawford was a contestant on Top Chef Masters, along with her spouse Lora Kirk. Crawford and Kirk published the cookbook Hearth & Home: Cook, Share and Celebrate Family Style in 2021.

In 2018, Crawford was the Iron Chef for the debut of Iron Chef Canada, a Food Network Canada series. She is one of five Iron Chefs in the series, along with Hugh Acheson, Amanda Cohen, Rob Feenie and Susur Lee.

== Personal life ==
Crawford is married.

== Filmography ==
Television
Year	Film	Role	Notes	Ref
2005–2008	Restaurant Makeover	Herself	Was one of the rotating chefs	
2007	Iron Chef America	Herself	Battled against Bobby Flay; Theme ingredient was peanut	
2010–2014	Pitchin' In	Herself	Host	
2011–2017	Top Chef Canada	Herself / Guest Judge / Resident Judge	4 episodes	
2013	Top Chef Masters	Herself	Competed in season 5 and was eliminated sixth	
2014–2017	Chopped Canada	Herself	One of the rotating judges	
2015	The Great Canadian Cookbook	Herself	Co-host with Noah Cappe	
2018–Present	Iron Chef Canada	Herself	One of five Iron Chefs along with Hugh Acheson, Amanda Cohen, Rob Feenie and Susur Lee	
2020	Wall of Chefs	Herself / Judge	2 episodes	
2020	Junior Chef Showdown	Herself / Judge	8 episodes	

== Awards and nominations ==
Lynn Crawford awards and nominations
Awards and nominations
Award	Wins	Nominations
Canadian Screen Awards	0	1
Consumer's Choice	1	1
Gemini Awards	0	1
Ontario Hostelry Institute	1	1
The Pennsylvania Academy of Fine Arts	1	1

Totals (Note: Certain award groups do not simply award one winner. They acknowledge several different recipients, have runners-up, and have third place. Since this is a specific recognition and is different from losing an award, runner-up mentions are considered wins in this award tally. For simplification and to avoid errors, each award in this list has been presumed to have had a prior nomination.)
- Wins: 3
- Nominations: 5

Year	Nominated work	Award	Category	Result	Ref
2008	Herself	—N/a	Thomas Jefferson Award Honoree	Won	
2010	Pitchin In – Shrimp	Gemini Award	Best Host in a Lifestyle/Practical Information, or Performing Arts Program or Series	Nominated	
2011	Herself	—N/a	Consumer's Choice Business Woman of the Year	Won	
2013	Herself	—N/a	Ontario Hostelry Institute Chef of the Year	Won	
2014	Pitchin' In	Canadian Screen Awards	Lifestyle Program or Series	Nominated	
