= Feenie's =

- Interactive map of Feenie's

Restaurant information
- Established: November 2000
- Head chef: Rob Feenie
- Food type: French, Canadian, North American
- Location: 2551 West Broadway, Vancouver, British Columbia, V6K 2E9, Canada

Feenie's was a bistro on West Broadway in the Kitsilano neighbourhood of Vancouver, British Columbia, Canada. It was the casual-dining sister-restaurant to Lumière, which was located next-door. Feenie's was founded by celebrity chef Rob Feenie, the first Canadian to win on Iron Chef America. Feenie was co-owner and executive chef until 2007, when he left the restaurant after a falling out with his business partners. After entering into a partnership with chef Daniel Boulud, the majority owners renamed the restaurant "db Bistro Moderne". On March 13, 2011, the ownership closed both db Bistro Moderne and Lumière.

Feenie's was featured on Rachael Ray's Tasty Travels on the Food Network when the show was in Vancouver.

== See also ==
- List of restaurants in Vancouver
