= Top 5 Restaurants =

American television series

- Genre: Food reality television
- Presented by: Sunny Anderson; Geoffrey Zakarian
- Country of origin: United States
- Original language: English
- No. of seasons: 3
- No. of episodes: 32

Production
- Producer: Authentic Entertainment
- Running time: 22:00

Original release
- Network: Food Network
- Release: June 15, 2015 – September 24, 2016

Top 5 Restaurants is an American food-themed television series that aired on Food Network. The series was presented by chefs Sunny Anderson and Geoffrey Zakarian; and it featured the chefs counting down the top food items from across the United States that the network's "food experts" were able to find.

== Episodes ==
=== Season 1 (2015) ===
No.	Title	Original air date
1	"Best Burgers"	June 15, 2015
2	"Best BBQ"	June 22, 2015
3	"Best Pizza"	June 29, 2015
4	"Best Steak"	July 6, 2015
5	"Best Tacos"	July 13, 2015
6	"Best Ice Cream"	July 20, 2015

=== Season 2 (2015–2016) ===
No.	Title	Original air date
1	"Best Thanksgiving"	November 16, 2015
2	"Best Diners"	November 23, 2015
3	"Best Sandwiches"	November 30, 2015
4	"Best for the Holidays"	December 7, 2015
5	"Best Desserts"	December 14, 2015
6	"Best Brunch"	December 21, 2015
7	"Best Fried Chicken"	January 4, 2016
8	"Best Ribs"	January 11, 2016
9	"Best Hot and Spicy Foods"	January 18, 2016
10	"Best Chocolate"	January 25, 2016
11	"Best Bar Food"	February 3, 2016
12	"Best Romantic Foods"	February 10, 2016
13	"Best Italian"	February 27, 2016

=== Season 3 (2016) ===
No.	Title	Original air date
1	"Best Soul Food"	June 18, 2016
2	"Best Breakfast"	June 25, 2016
3	"Best Fried Foods"	July 2, 2016
4	"Best Cheap Eats"	July 16, 2016
5	"Best Cheesy Eats"	July 23, 2016
6	"Best Chinese Food"	July 30, 2016
7	"Best Food Trucks"	August 6, 2016
8	"Best Mexican Food"	August 13, 2016
9	"Best Late Night Eats"	August 27, 2016
10	"Best Bacon Bites"	September 3, 2016
11	"Best Street Food"	September 10, 2016
12	"Best Doughnuts"	September 17, 2016
13	"Best Lunch"	September 24, 2016
