= Susur Lee =

Canadian celebrity chef (born 1958)

- Born: December 27, 1958 (age 67); British Hong Kong
- Occupation: Chef/Cook
- Known for: Iron chef
- Style: Fusion cuisine
- Spouses: Marilou Covey (m. 1978; died 1983) Brenda Bent (m. 1991)

Chinese name
- Traditional Chinese: 李國緯
- Simplified Chinese: 李国纬
Transcriptions
Standard Mandarin
- Hanyu Pinyin: Lǐ Guówěi
Yue: Cantonese
- Jyutping: Lei^{5} Gwok^{3} Wai^{5}
- IPA: [lej˩˧ kʷɔk̚˧ wɐj˩˧]
- Website: www.susur.com

Susur Lee (Chinese: 李國緯; born 27 December 1958) is a Canadian celebrity chef based in Toronto, Ontario, Canada. He is known for being the lead chef on Iron Chef Canada, for his four restaurants, and more recently, for his short-form cooking content on YouTube and TikTok.

== Early life ==
Lee was born in Hong Kong, the youngest of six children. He served his culinary apprenticeship at Hong Kong's Peninsula Hotel.

== Career ==
Lee worked his way to executive chef status at a number of restaurants and eventually became an entrepreneur. His eclectic culinary style is described as fusion cuisine. He is especially well known for "Singapore Slaw", his take on Lo Hei salad, which is traditionally eaten during the Chinese New Year.

Lee was a finalist in the second season of the Bravo TV show Top Chef: Masters, finishing in a tie for second behind winner Marcus Samuelsson. He has made guest appearances on numerous television cooking shows, and was the second Canadian chef (after Rob Feenie) to appear on the Food Network's Iron Chef America.

Lee's career includes being a chef at numerous Toronto dining establishments, judging culinary events, appearing on many food and wine television shows and owning/managing popular restaurants in Canada, United States and Singapore. Lotus, his first restaurant, opened in Toronto in 1987. He owns and manages Susur Lee Restaurant Group.

== Social media ==
Lee is featured in TikTok videos produced by his son Jet, as part of a recurring series where he "turns various foods gourmet". He also owns the YouTube channel "Iron Chef Dad" with various food-related videos, that also frequently feature his son.

== Awards ==
Lee's awards include the CAA Five Diamond Award, Cannes, France; the American Academy of Hospitality Services' 5 Diamond Award (selected as one of the "World's Best Chefs") and being named one of the "Ten Chefs of the Millennium" by Food & Wine. In 2017 he was given "Canada's Best 100 Lifetime Achievement Award". In 2015, Susur was one of the recipients of the 2015 Top 25 Canadian Immigrant Awards presented by Canadian Immigrant Magazine.

== Personal life ==
Lee met his first wife Marilou Covey while he was a sous chef at the Peninsula Hong Kong. They immigrated to Canada in 1978, where they married in the same year. In 1983, the couple had decided to move to Hong Kong, but Covey died as a passenger aboard Korean Air Lines Flight 007, which was destroyed by a Soviet jet fighter. Susur married Brenda Bent in 1991, with whom he has three children: Levi, Kai and Jet.

== Current restaurants ==
- Lee, Toronto (owner and chef), 2004 – present
- Tung Lok Heen (formerly Chinois), Singapore (owner and chef), 2010–present
- Lee Kitchen, Toronto Pearson International Airport, 2015–present
- Kid Lee, Toronto (owner and chef), 2018–2020

== Past restaurant affiliations ==
- Luckee (Chinese: 祿記), Toronto (owner and chef), 2014–December 2018
- Fring's, Toronto (co-owner rapper Drake), 2015–2018
- Bent, Toronto (owner and chef), 2012–2017
- Zentan at the Donovan House, Washington, D.C. (owner and chef), 2009–2013
- Shang, New York (owner and chef), 2008–2011
- Madeline's, Toronto (owner and chef), 2008–2010
- Susur, Toronto (owner and chef), 2000–2008
- Prague Fine Food Emporium, Toronto, 1998
- Ritz-Carlton, Singapore (consulting chef), 1997
- Kojis Kaizen, Montreal
- Hemispheres, Toronto (consulting chef)
- Oceans, 1990
- Lotus, Toronto (owner and chef), 1987–1997
- La Bastille, Toronto (guest chef), 1987
- Lela, Toronto (chef or executive chef)
- Peter Pan, Toronto (chef or executive chef)
- Le Trou Normand, Toronto
- Le Connaisseur, Toronto
- The Westbury Hotel, Toronto (cook)
- Peninsula Hotel, Hong Kong (apprentice/commis)

== Book ==
- A Culinary Life, co-written with Canadian Chef Jacob Richler. Published by Ten Speed Press.

== TV appearances ==
- Iron Chef Canada - Iron Chef
- Chopped Canada - guest judge
- Canada Crew
- Top Chef Canada - guest judge
- Top Chef - guest judge
- Top Chef Masters - finalist (runner-up)
- At the Table With... - biography on Susur's career
- East Meets West - guest judge
- Food Jammers - guest appearance in "Global Dumpling" episode
- Iron Chef America - tied chef Bobby Flay in "Battle Bacon"
- Opening Soon - Lee Restaurant
- Restaurant Makeover - Dhaba Indian Excellence
- Simply Ming - guest chef in the "Hoisin Sauce and Pizza Dough" episode
- This Is Daniel Cook
- Bizarre Foods America
- MasterChef Asia - judge
- Wall of Chefs - judge

== Controversy ==
In 2007, the Ontario Ministry of Labour investigated six claims of unpaid wages from former employees at Lee's Susur restaurant on King Street West in Toronto that also included complaints of excessive work hours, failure to provide employees with due time off, and various other employment standards and human rights violations.

In April 2017, Fring's Restaurant in Toronto, co-owned by Lee and rapper Drake, had its liquor license suspended for a week by the Alcohol and Gaming Commission of Ontario. The establishment was cited for numerous Liquor Control and Fire Protection and Prevention violations, including overcrowding, promoting "immoderate consumption", and failing to post its license.

In August 2017, prior occurrences of employees at Lee's Toronto restaurants — Lee, Fring's, and Bent — having their tips docked to pay for spilled drinks, errors, and unpaid guest checks, an illegal business practice in Ontario, were revealed via screenshots on a pseudonymous Twitter account known for calling out personalities in the Toronto food scene. As a result, representatives for the chef have announced the policy is no longer in effect. Still, a petition was launched demanding the chef and his restaurants reinstate the money that was withheld. After more than 7,000 customers petitioned Lee, he and his sons, Kai Bent-Lee and Levi Bent-Lee, who help to manage the family business, announced that they would refund all retained gratuities to current and past staff.
