= Greta and Janet Podleski =

Canadian authors

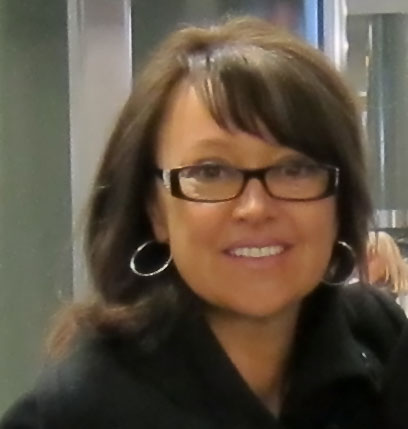
Janet Podleski

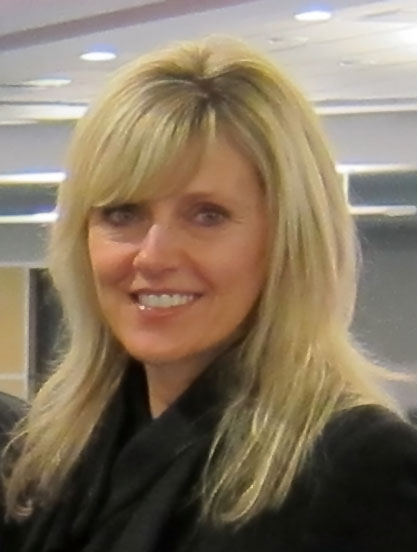
Greta Podleski

Janet and Greta Podleski are Canadian authors, chefs and television presenters. The two sisters were born and raised in St. Thomas, Ontario.

The Podleski sisters' first book, Looneyspoons: Low-Fat Food Made Fun, was rejected by seven publishers before they convinced David Chilton to invest.

As of 2008, Greta and Janet have penned three cookbooks: Looneyspoons: Low-Fat Food Made Fun, Crazy Plates: Low-Fat Food So Good, You'll Swear It's Bad for You! and Eat, Shrink and Be Merry!, the last one becoming an inspiration and basis for a TV Cooking show of the same name on the Food Network hosted by the sisters themselves. Their books feature health conscious recipes that are usually low in fat and sodium and high in fibre and protein. All of the books are written in a fairly easy to follow and humorous manner and the recipes usually include nutritional information. In 2000, the sisters were recognized with Canada's Top 40 Under 40 award, an award that honours Canadians under the age of 40 who have become outstanding achievers or leaders in their field of expertise.
