= Christine Cushing: Cook with Me =

Canadian television series

Christine Cushing: Cook With Me was a 2005-2006 Canadian cooking show that incorporated a variety of recipes and discussions. The host, Christine Cushing, is accompanied by three guests who fuel conversations and help cook the meals of the day. Each episode has a special menu to go along with the themed meal, such as "Girl's Poker Night", "The Big Game", and "At the Ranch".

Cook With Me was part of the Food Network (Canada), and episodes aired every weekday at 11:30 AM, 5:00 PM ET.

== Host ==
Originally from Athens, Christine Cushing and her family moved across the world to Toronto, Canada when she was one. There she attended George Brown College and École de Cuisine La Varenne, completing the Food and Beverage Management program.

Cushing has taught Canadians how to cook for over 15 years. She recently launched a new series of recipes on how to cook cakes using olive oil.

== TV appearances ==
- 1999-2001 Life Network: Dish It Out
- 2001-2006 Food Network Canada: Christine Cushing Live
- 2009–present Oprah Winfrey Network: Fearless in the Kitchen

== Episodes ==
Episode	Title	Air date	Guests	Description
1	"Some like it Spicy"	October 3, 2005	Christine Cushing, David Merry, and Don Gough	Recipes: Spicy Beef with Steamed Rice and Bok Choy, Spicy Caesar Sorbet, and Spicy Green Mango and Cucumber Salad
2	"Food Adventures"	October 4, 2005	Cleo Paskal, Calo Rota, and Benson Cowan	Recipes: Fresh Melon with Prosciutto and Bouillabaisse with Saffron mayonnaise
3	"Mood Food"	October 5, 2005	Cathy Gildiner, Jenn Stone, and Harry Doupe	Recipes: Linguine with Clams, Banana Fritters with Vanilla Ice Cream and Caramel Sauce, and Grilled Garlic Bread with Thyme Infused Butter
4	"Meat Lovers"	October 6, 2005	Stephen Alexander, Larry Horowitz, and Matt Galloway	Recipes: Porterhouse Steak with Hollandaise, Rustic Potato and Parsnip Mash, and Beef Carpaccio with Arugula and Pecorino
5	"Teen Taste Buds"	October 10, 2005	Miriam McDonald, Keith Peiris, and Matt Costello	Recipes: Lotus and Taro Root Chips with Sea Salt, Tuna Carpaccio with Sesame Lime Dressing, and Napa Cabbage Slaw with Lime Honey Dressing
6	"Best Dinner Ever"	October 11, 2005	Dean Blundell, John Lee and Monika Schnarre	Recipes: Herb Crusted Lamb Rack with Cassis Reduction, Pavlova with Hazelnut Cream and Raspberry Coulis, and Grilled Langoustine with Lemongrass Butter
7	"Food Personalities"	October 12, 2005	Bob Blumer, Michael Bonacini, and Donna Dooher	Recipes: Grape Chutney with Brie, Arugula Salad with Pear and Prosciutto, and Grilled Squid Skewers
8	"Food on the Go"	October 13, 2005	Marnie McBean, Peter Kent, and Bruce Gordon	Recipes: Spinach Salad with Sprouts and Buttermilk Dressing, Homemade Pizza, and Banana Orange Sorbet
9	"Supermoms"	October 17, 2005	Lynn Johnston, Michelle Hatzioannou, and Jennifer Low	Recipes: Celeriac and Potato Gratin with White Truffle Oil, Grilled Duck Breast with Blueberry Glaze, and French Apple Tart
10	"Food Quirks"	October 18, 2005	Divine Brown, Nikki Payne, and Sonia Thapar	Recipes: Chicken with Rosemary Wine Sauce, Garden Salad with Minneola Dressing, and Cheesecake with Mixed Berry Sauce
11	"Dining In"	October 19, 2005	Bonnie Stern, Sean MacMahon, and Helder Carvelho	Recipes: Smoked Duck Salad, Sweet Lobster with Pernod and Baby Vegetable, and Espresso Chocolate Cream Brûlée
12	"Salty N' Sweet"	October 20, 2005	Elvira Kurt, Jennifer Hamilton, and Kevin Von Appen	Recipes: Salt Cod Fritters with Lemon and Caper Mayonnaise, Chocolate Pecan Torte with Caramel Sauce and Fleur de Sel, and Feta and Watermelon Salad
13	"Coffee"	October 24, 2005	Stuart Ross, Winston Spear, and Peter Pesce	Recipes: Lemon Semolina Cookies, Wild Mushroom and Asiago Quiche, Beignets with Cinnamon and Sugar
14	"Memories of Paris"	October 25, 2005	Sarah Slean, Marilyn Brook, and Jean-Pierre Challet	Recipes: Citrus Salad with Walnuts, Clafouti, and Moules and Frites
15	"Mexico"	October 26, 2005	Anna Marie Kalcevich, Mauricio Cabrera, and Jonathan Carroll	Recipes: Margarita, Angel Food Cake with Mango Lime Salsa and Vanilla Cream, Pork Adobado, and Mexican Red Potatoes Salad with Avocado and Red Pepper
16	"Fishing"	October 27, 2005		
17	"Perfect Party"	October 31, 2005		
18	"Power Foods"	November 1, 2005		
19	"Kitchen Catastrophes"	November 2, 2005		
20	"Eating With Your Eyes"	November 3, 2005		
21	"Classic Italian"	November 7, 2005		
22	"Canadian Brunch"	November 8, 2005		
23	"Airplane Food"	November 9, 2005		
24	"Food Hunters"	November 10, 2005		
25	"Mr. Moms"	November 14, 2005		
26	"Power Foods"	November 15, 2005		
27	"My Favorite Wine"	November 16, 2005		
28	"Kitchen Catastrophes"	November 17, 2005		
29	"Exotic Food"	November 22, 2005		
30	"Beer Culture"	November 23, 2005		
31	"New York"	November 24, 2005		
32	"The Big Game"	November 28, 2005		
33	"Slow Food"	November 29, 2005		
34	"Aphrodisiacs"	November 30, 2005		
35	"Weekend Brunch"	December 1, 2005		
36	"Chill Out"	December 3, 2005		
37	"Indoor Picnic"	December 5, 2005		
38	"It's All Greek"	December 6, 2005		
39	"Creative Juices"	December 7, 2005		
40	"Movie and a Meal"	December 8, 2005		
41	"Girl's Poker Night"	December 9, 2005		
42	"Etiquette"	December 10, 2005		
43	"Memories of Home"	December 12, 2005		
44	"Caribbean"	December 13, 2005		
45	"Bollywood"	December 14, 2005		
46	"Sunday Supper"	December 15, 2005		
47	"At the Ranch"	January 2, 2006		
48	"Chemistry"	January 2, 2006		
49	"Power Lunch"	January 3, 2006		
50	"Catering to the Stars"	January 4, 2006		
51	"Unexpected Guests"	January 9, 2006		
52	"Asia"	January 9, 2006		
53	"Mom's Cooking"	January 10, 2006		
54	"Family Business"	January 11, 2006		
