= Chefs vs. City =

- Also known as: Chefs vs. City
- Genre: Reality TV, Cooking
- Starring: Aarón Sanchez; Chris Cosentino; Ethan Erickson
- Country of origin: United States
- Original language: English
- No. of seasons: 2

Production
- Camera setup: Multi-camera
- Running time: 46 minutes

Original release
- Network: Food Network
- Release: August 7, 2009 – August 27, 2010

Chefs vs. City is an American television show that aired on Food Network for two seasons from 2009 to 2010. The show stars chefs Aarón Sanchez and Chris Cosentino, who travel to different cities of the United States to challenge two local chefs to a variety of food-related challenges. The show was hosted by actor Ethan Erickson.

== Show format ==
Each episode takes place in a major United States city. The show features two teams: two Food Network chefs (Sanchez and Cosentino) and two chefs from the featured city. At the beginning of the show, each contestant receives a backpack with certain instruments that they will use during the contest, and a dossier with information on their first stop. Each team is given a Ford Expedition to move around the city as they try to reach each stop ahead of the other team.

At each stop, both teams have to complete a certain food-related task before they receive a new dossier and advance to the next contest. Examples of tasks include eating a whole serving of an extremely spicy or very large dish, sampling and separating products, and cooking or prepping dishes.

After the final contest, the contestants have to race through a finish line together to win.

Of the show's twenty episodes, Chris and Aaron won in 14 of them, and lost in six.

=== Changes from season 1 to 2 ===
During season 1, the competitors would have to run to the finish line. But, during season 2, they would drive to the finish line and then run. Also in season 2, the directions on the signs at the challenges got shorter. The first five season 2 episodes featured Chris and Aaron against fellow Food Network stars, who acted as the "City" representatives.

== Controversy ==
In 2014, Cosentino gave a talk at the MAD Symposium about how he regretted participating in the series. Most notably, he had gotten third-degree alkaline burns on his stomach lining as a result of the eating challenges, which he said took him five years to recover from, during which time he had to carefully monitor his diet. He also said that the show made him look "like a bully" when he and Sanchez beat the local chefs, and that the show's eating challenges glamorized overeating.

== Season 1 ==
Episode	Show #	Date	City	City Chefs	Winner
1	CS0101	August 7, 2009	New York City, New York	Kelsey Nixon and Claire Robinson	Chefs
2	CS0102	August 14, 2009	Las Vegas, Nevada	Stephen Hopcraft and Santanna Salas	City
3	CS0103	August 21, 2009	Boston, Massachusetts	Peter and Robert Depesa	Chefs
4	CS0104	August 28, 2009	San Francisco, California	Anna Wankel and Melissa Perello	Chefs
5	CS0105	September 4, 2009	Chicago, Illinois	Gregg and Joey Morelli	Chefs
6	CS0106	September 11, 2009	Los Angeles, California	Amy Powell and Nino Linsmayer	City
7	CS0107	September 18, 2009	New Orleans, Louisiana	Alfred Singleton and Stephanie Bernard	Chefs

== Season 2 ==
Episode	Show #	Date	City	City Chefs	Winner
1	CS0201	April 18, 2010	Miami, Florida	Claire Robinson and Sunny Anderson	Chefs
2	CS0202	April 25, 2010	Atlanta, Georgia	Robert Irvine and George Galati	City
3	CS0203	May 2, 2010	Savannah, Georgia	Jamie Deen and Bobby Deen	City
4	CS0204	May 9, 2010	Dallas, Texas	Aaron McCargo, Jr. and Adam Gertler	City
5	CS0205	May 16, 2010	Phoenix, Arizona	Duff Goldman and Geof Manthorne	Chefs
6	CS0206	May 30, 2010	Hollywood, California	Daisy Roman and David Rosenberger	Chefs
7	CS0207	June 18, 2010	Seattle, Washington	Carrie Mashaney and Jason Stratton	Chefs
8	CS0208	June 25, 2010	Portland, Oregon	Gabriel Kapustka and Ryan McMallen	Chefs
9	CS0209	July 16, 2010	San Diego, California	Kari Rich and Steve Pickett	Chefs
10	CS0210	July 23, 2010	Palm Springs, California	Tony DiLembo and Thomas Hogan	City
11	CS0211	August 13, 2010	Philadelphia, Pennsylvania	Quincy Logan and Chaz Brown	Chefs
12	CS0212	August 20, 2010	Baltimore, Maryland	Ann Marie Langton and Thomas Looney	Chefs
13	CS0213	August 27, 2010	Washington, D.C.	Terrell Danely and Ryan Gordon	Chefs
