= Tregaye Fraser =

American chef

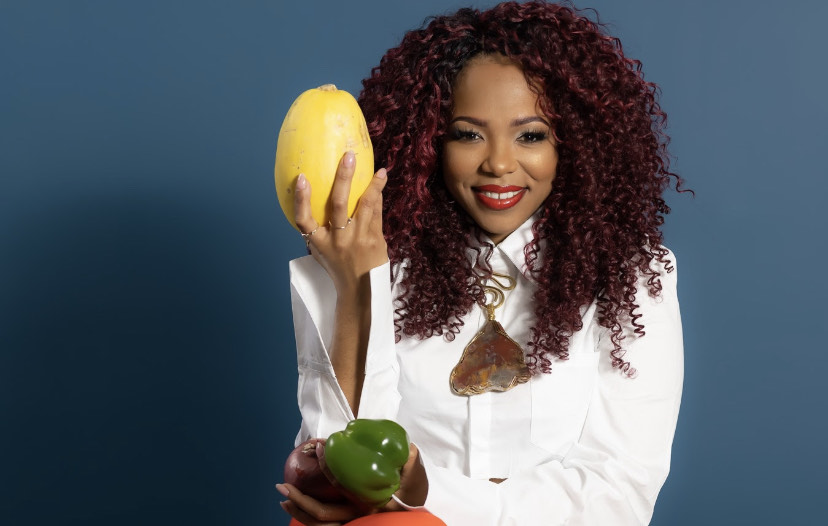
- Artwork from Tregaye Fraser's cookbook, Kitchen Conversations with Chef Tregaye Fraser (2021)
- Born: September 6, 1984 (age 40); Atlanta, Georgia, US
- Culinary career
- Cooking style: American Fusion
- Television show(s): Kitchen Sink Tregayes way(tv series) Cakealikes (tv series)
- Website: www.cheftregaye.com

Tregaye Fraser (born September 6, 1984) is an American chef.

== Career ==
Fraser trained at Le Cordon Bleu. She is the winner of the 12th season of the Food Network television series Food Network Star. She competed and won several episodes of Cutthroat Kitchen and Guy's Grocery Games, was featured on Best Thing I Ever Ate (7 episodes) and All-Star Best Thing I Ever Ate (2020). She's made appearances on broadcast talk shows from Steve Harvey to Good Morning America.
