= Kitchen Sink (TV series) =

- Genre: Food reality television
- Country of origin: United States
- Original language: English
- No. of seasons: 2
- No. of episodes: 10 (1 unaired)

Production
- Producer: BSTV Entertainment
- Running time: 22:00

Original release
- Network: Food Network
- Release: May 15, 2016 – January 29, 2017

Related
- The Kitchen

Kitchen Sink is an American cooking show that aired on Food Network. It is presented by a rotating lineup of chefs who teach the viewers how to create different indulgent recipes. During the first season, the series was titled The Kitchen Sink.

The series is a spin-off of The Kitchen. However, unlike The Kitchen, it did not have a studio audience; and it ran for 22 minutes instead of 41 minutes.

== Episodes ==
=== Season 1 (2016) ===
No.	Title	Presenters	Original air date	Production code
1	"Best Snacks Ever" (Note: "Best Snacks Ever" was produced as the second episode of the first season, but it aired as the first episode of the season.)	Sunny Anderson; Jeff Mauro; Marcela Valladolid	May 15, 2016	SI0102H
2	"The Great Debate: Cake vs. Pie" (Note: "The Great Debate: Cake vs. Pie" was produced as the fourth episode of the first season, but it aired as the second episode of the season.)	Lazarus Lynch; Jeff Mauro; Marcela Valladolid	May 22, 2016	SI0104H
3	"11 Ways to Win at Summer"	Katie Lee; Geoffrey Zakarian	May 29, 2016	SI0103H
4	"The Nine Ways to Build a Better Cupcake" (Note: "The Nine Ways to Build a Better Cupcake" was produced as the first episode of the first season, but it aired as the fourth episode of the season.)	Katie Lee; Lazarus Lynch; Geoffrey Zakarian	June 5, 2016	SI0101H
5	"Rainbow Foods to Brighten Your Day"	Katie Lee; Geoffrey Zakarian	June 12, 2016	SI0105H
6	"What to Eat Now"	Sunny Anderson; Lazarus Lynch; Jeff Mauro; Marcela Valladolid	June 19, 2016	SI0106H

=== Season 2 (2017) ===
No.	Title	Presenters	Original air date	Production code
1	"Foods You Need in Your Life"	Tregaye Fraser; Jeff Mauro; Fanny Slater	January 15, 2017	SI0201H
2	"Carbs on Carbs"	Tregaye Fraser; Katie Lee; Spike Mendelsohn	January 22, 2017	SI0202H
3	"The Ultimate Party Menu"	Sunny Anderson; Vivian Chan; Tregaye Fraser; Spike Mendelsohn	January 29, 2017	SI0203H
4	"Sunday Funday: Brunch"	Fanny Slater	unaired	SI0204H
