= Michael Allemeier =

Canadian chef (born 1967)

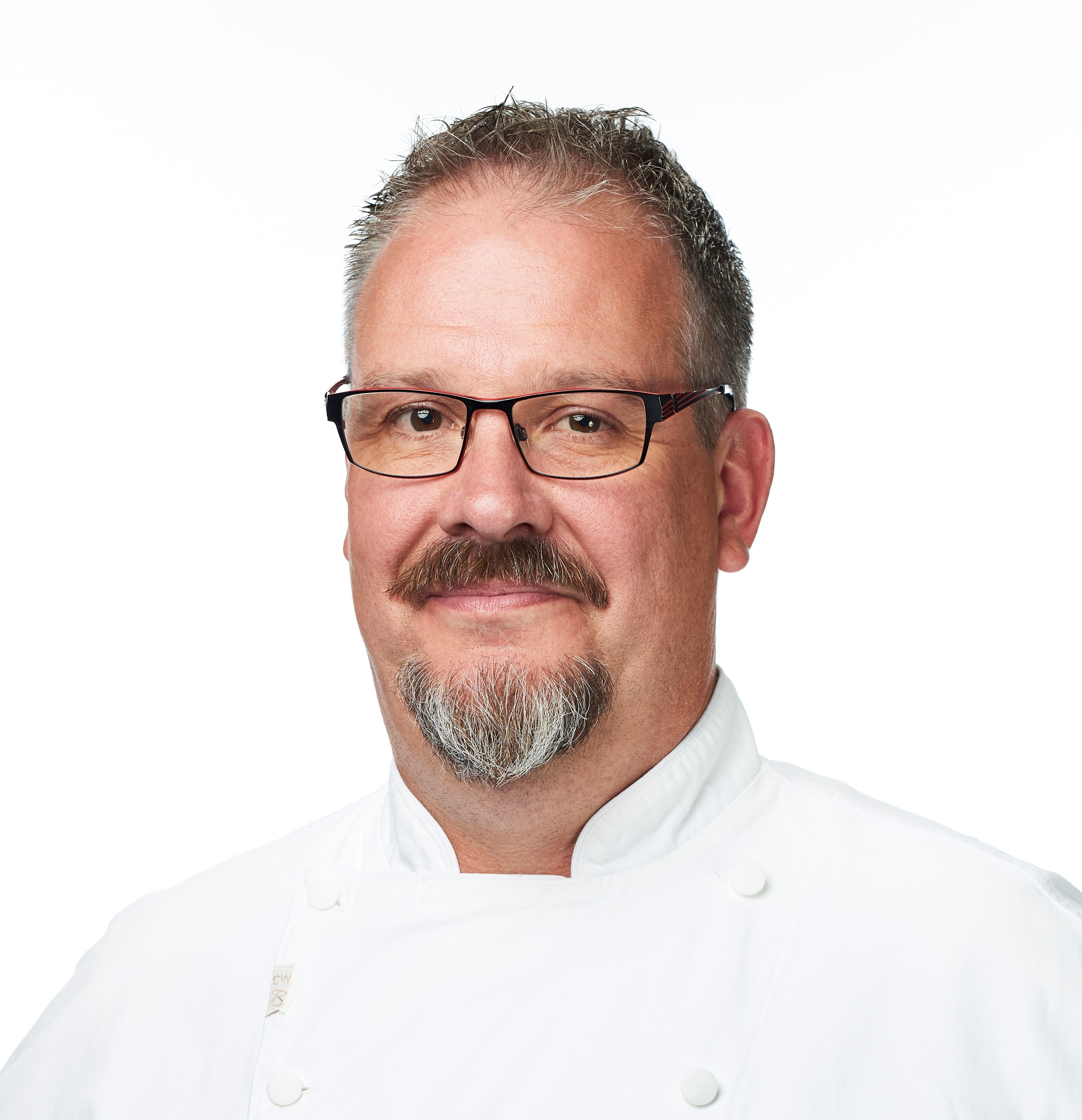
- Chef Allemeier CMC
- Born: Johannesburg, South Africa
- Culinary career
- Cooking style: Canadian Regional
- Television show
- Cook Like a Chef

Michael Allemeier CMC (born 1967) is a South African-born Canadian who is an Instructor of Culinary Arts at SAIT Polytechnic and former Executive Chef at Mission Hill Family Estate in Westbank, British Columbia, Bishops in Vancouver, and Teatro in Calgary.

Chef Allemeier has served in his current position since August 2009. He provides instruction to hundreds of students in the School of Hospitality and Tourism at SAIT.

While at Mission Hill Family Estate, Chef Allemeier oversaw all food operations at the winery including the Terrace Restaurant, Private Dining, Banquets, Culinary Workshops and a product line of winery made preserves.

Chef Allemeier is a host on Food Network's and Gusto's Cook Like a Chef.

In 2001, Chef Allemeier earned the title of Certified Chef de Cuisine (CCC), Canada's second highest professional culinary accreditation designation. He describes his style of cooking as "Cuisine de Terroir."

In 2017, Chef Allemeier earned his Certified Master Chef (CMC) designation. He was the third Canadian Chef to earn this trade designation.

== International Youth ==
Allemeier was born in Johannesburg South Africa in 1967. He lived most of his youth outside of Canada in places including Hong Kong where he developed an appreciation for diverse culinary styles.

== Bishop's ==
Allemeier came to prominence as a chef during his 7 years at Vancouver's Bishop’s restaurant. For his last 5 years, Allemeier served as Executive Chef.

== Whistler & Calgary ==
After leaving Bishop's, Allemeier spent a year running the Kitchen at the Wildflower Restaurant in the Fairmont Chateau Whistler in Whistler, British Columbia before moving to Calgary, Alberta to serve as Executive Chef at Teatro from 1998 to 2002. From 2002 to 2003, Allemeier was the consulting Executive Chef at Wrayton's Fresh Market in Calgary.

== Cooking for Presidents ==
On April 4, 1993, Allemeier cooked the dinner meal for President of the United States Bill Clinton and President of the Russian Federation Boris Yeltsin during their summit meeting in Vancouver, British Columbia.

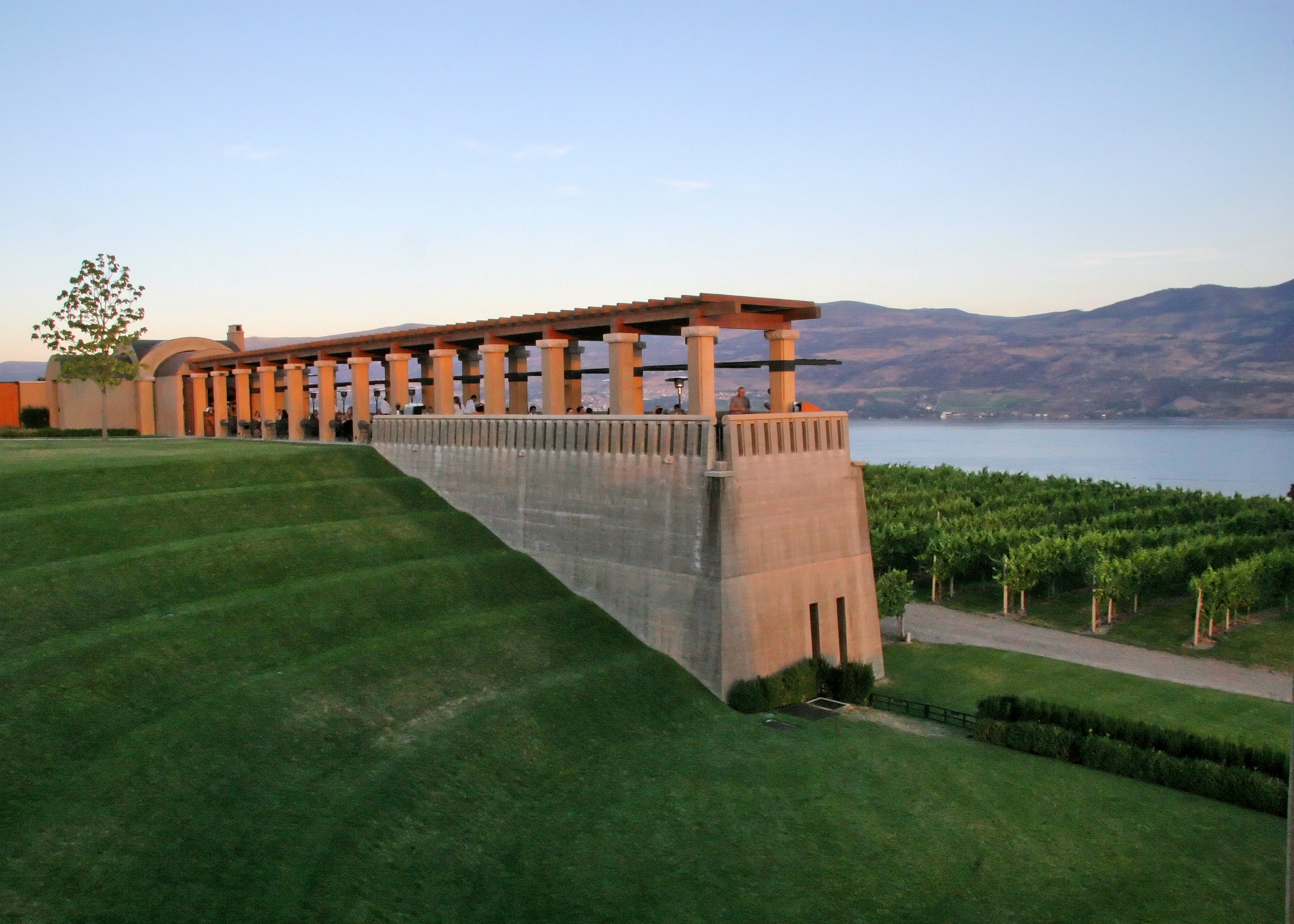
Terrace Restaurant at Mission Hill Winery

== Mission Hill Family Estate ==
Allemeier moved to the Okanagan Valley of British Columbia in 2003 to accept the position of Executive Winery Chef at Mission Hill Winery. As the Winery Chef, Allemeier designed menus that complement the estate's wine offerings with a focus on locally produced, sustainable ingredients. During his time at Mission Hill, Travel Leisure Magazine recognized The Terrace Restaurant as one of the "Top Five Winery Restaurants" in the world.

== Becoming a Master Chef ==
On June 11, 2017, Chef Allemeier completed his CMC (Certified Master Chef), becoming Canada's third Chef to achieve this designation. The CMC (Certified Master Chef) is the most demanding and highest culinary designation in Canada and is internationally recognized in the industry as a Master of the Craft.

== Television ==
- Grocery Bags - W Network 2008
- Thirsty Traveler - Food Network Canada 2007
- Chef at Large - Food Network Canada 2006

Allemeier is one of the Host Chefs of Cook Like a Chef. As a host he filmed 20 episodes of Food Network's Cook Like a Chef, including:

=== Season One ===
- Fish Episode
- Game Episode
- Pasta Episode
- Pork Episode
- Potatoes Episode
- Soufflé Episode
- Turkey Episode

=== Season Two ===
- Beans Episode
- Desserts Episode
- Fowl Episode
- Game Episode
- Nuts & Seeds Episode
- Sauces Episode

=== Season Three ===
- Baking Episode
- Shellfish Episode
- Vegetables Episode

=== Season Four ===
- BBQ Episode
- Cheese Episode
- Pressure Cooker Episode
- Mushroom Episode

== Education ==
- Kelvin High School Grade 12 1985
- Red River Community College 1989, Cook's Apprentice Levels I-III
- Red Seal Journeyman's Paper 1989
- Cona Sucre D'art 1994, Sugar Forms & Usage
- Chateau Whister Resort 1997, Kitchen Leadership
- SAIT 2001, CCC Certification Coursework
- Canadian Culinary Institute 2001, Certified Chef de Cuisine
- ISG 2006, Wine Fundamentals I
- WSET 2015, WSET II
- Canadian Culinary Institute, Humber College, 2017, Certified Master Chef

== Awards ==
- Vancouver Magazine - Best Winery/Vineyard Dining April 2009
- Urban Diner - Best Winery restaurant April 2009
- Chaine des Rotisseurs - Silver Star of Excellence (October 2008)
- Travel & Leisure Magazine – Best Winery Restaurant in the World (2008)
- Canadian Culinary Institute - Certified Chef de Cuisine (2001)
- Vancouver Magazine - Gold Medal Best Winery/Vineyard Dining (2008)
- Vancouver Magazine - Silver Medal Best Okanagan Restaurant (2007)
- Vancouver Magazine - Gold Medal Best Okanagan Restaurant (2006)
- Vancouver Magazine - Silver Medal Best Okanagan Restaurant (2005)
- Master Chef (June 2017)

== Personal life ==
Allemeier, his wife Meredith and their two sons live in Calgary, Alberta. He is an avid rock-climber, hiker and cross country skier.
