= The Kitchen (talk show) =

American cooking talk show

- Genre: Talk show
- Presented by: Sunny Anderson; Katie Lee; Jeff Mauro; Geoffrey Zakarian; Marcela Valladolid (2014–2017); Alex Guarnaschelli (2020–2024)
- Country of origin: United States
- Original language: English
- No. of seasons: 36
- No. of episodes: 490

Production
- Executive producer: Blake Swerdloff
- Producer: BSTV Entertainment
- Production locations: New York City, New York, United States

Original release
- Network: Food Network
- Release: January 4, 2014 – December 13, 2025

Related
- Kitchen Sink

The Kitchen is an American cooking-themed talk show that aired on Food Network. The series presenters were Food Network chefs Sunny Anderson (Cooking for Real) and Jeff Mauro (Sandwich King) as well as chef Katie Lee and Iron Chef Geoffrey Zakarian. The series premiered on January 4, 2014. The show produced over 490 episodes and 14 specials.

On February 20, 2014, it was announced that the series had been renewed for a second season, which began airing on April 19, 2014. The series ran for 36 seasons. Marcela Valladolid announced her departure from the show on October 18, 2017, citing a desire to focus on family.

On October 20, 2025, the show was canceled by Food Network after eleven years, with the series finale airing on December 13, 2025. A post-cancelation special episode was announced in March 2026.

== Awards and nominations ==
Year	Award	Category	Work	Result
2015	Daytime Emmy Awards	Outstanding Art Direction/Set Decoration/Scenic Design	—N/a	Nominated
2015	Daytime Emmy Awards	Outstanding Talk Show / Informative	—N/a	Nominated
