= The Great Canadian Cookbook =

Canadian television show

The Great Canadian Cookbook is a Canadian television and web series, which aired on Food Network in 2015. Hosted by Noah Cappe and Lynn Crawford, the series profiled the diversity and richness of Canadian cuisine, through visits to various restaurateurs and other people involved in the food industry throughout the country.

The series consisted of four full television episodes, with additional segments presented as a web series on the program's website.

The series was a shortlisted finalist for Lifestyle Program or Series at the 5th Canadian Screen Awards.
