= Ask Aida =

- Starring: Aida Mollenkamp
- Country of origin: United States
- Original language: English
- No. of seasons: 3
- No. of episodes: 39

Production
- Running time: 30 minutes
- Production company: Sharp Entertainment

Original release
- Network: Food Network
- Release: August 2, 2008 – December 5, 2009

Ask Aida is an interactive cooking show on the Food Network hosted by Aida Mollenkamp. The show began airing on August 2, 2008. On Ask Aida, Noah Starr serves as the "tech guru" sorting through then asking the many culinary questions sent to Mollenkamp via email, text, phone calls and video. Also during each episode, Noah tries to "stump" Aida with a crazy ingredient or gadget. Each show also has an advertisement telling viewers how they can get a link to that episode's recipes via text message.

For Season 2, the format of the show changed slightly, Starr was removed from the program.

== Episodes ==
=== Season 1 ===
1. Hot Off the Grill
2. Steak and Potatoes
3. Easy as Pie
4. Eggs
5. Catch of the Day
6. Weeknight Dinners
7. Pasta in Presto
8. Mexican Night
9. Sweet Morning
10. Chicken
11. Lasagna
12. Double Dips
13. Southern Comfort

=== Season 2 ===
1. Light & Healthy
2. Quick and Affordable
3. Simple Asian
4. Game On
5. Taqueria Mexicana
6. Chocolate
7. Pizza
8. Comfort Food
9. Fast With Five
10. Veggies Rock
11. One Dish Wonders
12. Spring Is in the Air
13. Mollenkamp Moms

=== Season 3 ===
1. Burger Bonanza
2. Grilling Greats
3. Cheesy Pasta
4. Cookie Craze
5. Steak, Rattle & Roll
6. Chicken in a Flash
7. Cheese Please
8. Simple Stews
9. Dinner Party Pork
10. Chocolate Bliss
11. Eggs-Travaganza
12. Aida's Thanksgiving
13. Aida's Holiday
