= Made to Order (TV series) =

- Created by: Guy Rubino & Michael Rubino
- Starring: Guy Rubino & Michael Rubino
- Country of origin: Canada

Production
- Running time: 30 minutes

Original release
- Network: Food Network Canada

Made to Order is a Canadian lifestyle show airing in more than 150 countries, including the Food Network and Fine Living in Canada, Fine Living in the US, Discovery Travel, and Living in Asia, Australia, India and South America. It features the behind-the-scenes of the running of rain, a high-end restaurant in Toronto, Ontario run by Michael and Guy Rubino. It had 39 episodes.
