= Rob Feenie =

Canadian chef

- Education: Dubrulle Culinary Institute (now The Art Institute of Vancouver)
- Culinary career
- Current restaurant
- Le Crocodile by Rob Feenie
- Previous restaurants
- Vancouver Golf Club (2023); Bacchus Restaurant, Wedgewood Hotel, Vancouver (2022-2023); Cactus Club Cafe (2008-2022); Lumière, Vancouver (2000-2007); Feenie's (2000-2007)
- Television show
- New Classics with Rob Feenie Wall of Chefs
- Website: www.lecrocodilerestaurant.com

Robert Feenie is the Executive Chef and Partner of Le Crocodile by Rob Feenie. He is a Canadian chef based in Vancouver, British Columbia.

== Culinary career ==
His interest in cooking began during a high school exchange program in Europe. He attended Dubrulle Culinary Institute (now part of The Art Institute of Vancouver). After graduation, Feenie worked as a sous chef at various restaurants, including The Rim Rock Café and Oyster Bar in Whistler, British Columbia and The Cherrystone Cove and Le Crocodile in Vancouver. While at Le Crocodile, Feenie worked stages in France and the United States. Later, Feenie opened Accolade Restaurant in the Crowne Plaza Hotel in Toronto.

Rob Feenie was the founder, co-owner and executive chef of Lumière and Feenie's in Vancouver. Those restaurants garnered critical and public success, including being awarded the prestigious Relais Gourmand designation, four stars from the Mobil Travel Guide and the AAA Diamond Award. In late 2007, Feenie had a dispute with his then-business partners. Ultimately, Feenie severed ties with them and left Lumière and Feenie's. On February 5, 2008, Feenie joined premium casual dining chain Cactus Club Cafe as a "Food Concept Architect".

Feenie is also a chef-consultant, who restructured Le Regence in the Hotel Plaza Athene. In July 2004, Chef Feenie was invited to New York by the Canadian Consulate to create an extravagant lunch and dinner at the famous James Beard House in celebration of Canada Day. In February 2009, Feenie became the first "Hokanson Chef in Residence" at NAIT.

Feenie has published three cookbooks, starred in New Classics with Rob Feenie on Food Network Canada, and in 2005 was the first Canadian to win on the popular television show, Iron Chef America, by defeating Chef Masaharu Morimoto.

== Filmography ==
Television
| Year | Title | Role | Notes |
|---|---|---|---|
| 2000-2004 | New Classics with Chef Rob Feenie | Himself | Host |
| 2005 | Iron Chef America | Himself/Challenger | Season 1 episode 5: "Crab"; Battled Masaharu Morimoto |
| 2011; 2018 | Top Chef Canada | Himself | Season 1 episode 11: "Surf and Turf" and Season 6 episode 1: "The Next Wave"; Guest judge |
| 2018–present | Iron Chef Canada | Himself | One of five Iron Chefs alongside Lynn Crawford, Susur Lee, Amanda Cohen, and Hugh Acheson |
| 2020 | Wall of Chefs | Himself | Competition judge |

== Books ==
- Rob Feenie Cooks at Lumière
- Lumière Light
- Feenie's
- Vancouver Cooks (Contributor)
