= Sunny Anderson =

American chef

- Born: April 9, 1975 (age 50); Lawton, Oklahoma, US
- Culinary career
- Television shows: Cooking for Real; How'd That Get on My Plate?; The Kitchen; Kitchen Sink; Top 5 Restaurants
- Website: http://www.sunnyanderson.com

Sunny Anderson (born April 9, 1975) is a Food Network personality. She began hosting How'd That Get On My Plate? in July 2008. She also hosts the Food Network program Cooking for Real (beginning in April 2008), and served as co-host with Marc Istook of the Food Network program Gotta Get It (beginning in April 2007).

== Early life ==
Sunny Anderson was born in Lawton, Oklahoma, and grew up as an Army brat, which allowed her to travel the world (living in Germany and other places) and sample many local cuisines with her parents, who were food enthusiasts. She attended Madison High School in San Antonio, Texas, and upon her graduation, she joined the United States Air Force in June 1993, where she earned the rank of Senior Airman and worked as a military radio host in Seoul, South Korea. She then worked for Air Force News Agency radio and television in San Antonio from 1993 to 1997. Anderson was honorably discharged from the Air Force in June 1997. She went to school in New Orleans at Loyola University. At age 19, Anderson was diagnosed with ulcerative colitis. in 2014, she teamed up with the Crohn's & Colitis Foundation of America to raise awareness of this disease.

== Career ==
Between 1995 and 2001, Anderson worked as a radio personality at KCJZ and KONO-FM in San Antonio, WYLD-FM and KUMX in Fort Polk, Louisiana, WJWZ in Montgomery, Alabama, and WDTJ in Detroit, Michigan.

Anderson settled in New York City in 2001 at the age of 26, and worked as a radio personality for HOT 97 (WQHT) in New York City from 2001 to 2003. From 2003 to 2005, she was the owner of Sunny's Delicious Dishes, a catering company based in Jersey City, New Jersey.

She first appeared on the Food Network in October 2005 (as a guest on the Emeril Live program) and began hosting How'd That Get On My Plate? in July 2008. She also hosts the Food Network program Cooking for Real (beginning in April 2008), and served as co-host with Marc Istook of the Food Network program Gotta Get It, beginning in April 2007.

In 2006 and 2007, she served as food and lifestyle editor for Hip Hop Weekly magazine.

In January 2014, Anderson became a co-host on the Food Network's series The Kitchen along with Jeff Mauro, Katie Lee, Marcela Valladolid, and Geoffrey Zakarian.

Anderson was a contender for the 44th Daytime Emmy Awards for the Outstanding Talk Show/Informative award with the cast of The Kitchen, but lost.

Anderson has been a guest chef on several talk shows and morning news programs including The Rachael Ray Show, Good Morning America, The Early Show, The View, The Talk, and The Wendy Williams Show.

In 2022, Anderson hosted NFL Tailgate Takedown along with New England Patriots Hall-of-Famer Vince Wilfork.

In October 2022 she hosted season 3 of Outrageous Pumpkins on Food Network.

== Filmography ==
as Host
Year	Title	Notes
2007	Gotta Get It: Grilling	Host
2008-2011	Cooking For Real	Host, 113 episodes
2014-2025	The Kitchen	Cohost, 345 episodes
2015-2016	Top 5 Restaurants	Co-host, 34 episodes
2019	Thanksgiving Pie Fight	Host
2021	Chocolate Meltdown: Hershey's After Dark	Host, 4 episodes
2021	Easter Basket Challenge	Host, 5 episodes
2021	Outrageous Pumpkins	Host, 4 episodes
2022	Spring Baking Championship: Easter	Host, 6 episodes
2023	NFL Tailgate Takedown	Host, 6 episodes

as Guest
Year	Title	Notes
2008	How'd That Get On My Plate	
2008	Dear Food Network	3 episodes
2008, 2014	The Wendy Williams Show	2 episodes
2008-2018	Rachael Ray	Cohost/guest, 68 episodes
2009-2018	Food Network Star	Guest Judge, 5 episodes
2010	Food Network Challenge	Competitor, 1 episode
2010-2011	The Best Thing I Ever Ate	14 episodes
2010, 2014	The View	2 episodes
2011	The Nate Berkus Show	
2011	Paula's Best Dishes	
2011	Thanksgiving Live!	TV Special
2011-2012	The Best Thing I Ever Made	9 episodes
2011-2012	The Perfect 3	3 episodes
2011-2022	Good Morning America	Guest, 8 episodes
2012	Thanksgiving Live!	TV Special
2012	Iron Chef America Countdown	6 episodes
2012	Iron Chef America: The Series	Judge, 2 episodes
2012	Katie	1 episode
2012	Home Made In America	6 episodes
2012-2025	Today	Cohost/guest, 36 episodes
2013	The Chew	1 episode
2013	David's Food Court	1 episode
2013	The Queen Latifah Show	1 episode
2013, 2014	Bethenny	2 episodes
2013, 2014	Melissa Harris-Perry	2 episodes
2013-2017	The Talk	Cohost/guest, 11 episodes
2013-2023	Chopped	Judge, 10 episodes
2014	Rachael vs. Guy: Celebrity Cook-Off	Judge, 1 episode
2014	Rewrapped	Judge, 1 episode
2014	The Doctors	Co-host, 1 episode
2014-2025	Beat Bobby Flay	Judge & Mentor, 48 episodes
2015	Fox and Friends	1 episode
2015	Rachael Ray's Kids Cook-Off	Judge, 1 episode
2015	Thanksgiving at Bobby's	1 episode
2015	Christmas as Bobby's	1 episode
2015-2018	Weekend Today	Guest, 3 episodes
2015-2018	Home & Family	6 episodes
2016	Brunch at Bobby's	1 episode
2016-2017	The Kitchen Sink	Cohost, 9 episodes
2016-2017	Cooks vs. Cons	Judge, 4 episodes
2017	Chopped Junior	Judge, 1 episode
2017	Pickler & Ben	2 episodes
2017	Steve	5 episodes
2017, 2018	Bakers vs. Fakers	Judge, 2 episodes
2020	GMA3: What You Need To Know	1 episode
2020	All-Star Best Thing I Ever Ate	4 episodes
2020	Turkey Day Sunny's Way	
2021	Live with Kelly and Mark	Guest, 1 episode
2023	Sesame Street: Oscar's Handmade Halloween	
2023	Tamron Hall	1 episode
2024	Name That Tune	1 episode
2024	GMA3	Guest, 1 episode
2023-2024	BBQ Brawl: Flay v. Simon	Captain, 12 episodes
2024-2025	The Drew Barrymore Show	Guest, News Contributor, 40 episodes

== Awards and nominations ==
Year	Organization	Award	Nominated work	Result
2017	Daytime Emmy Award	Outstanding Informative Talk Show Host	The Kitchen (shared with Katie Lee, Jeff Mauro, Marcela Valladolid, and Geoffrey Zakarian	Nominated

== See also ==
- List of people diagnosed with ulcerative colitis
