= Iron Chef Canada =

Canadian television program

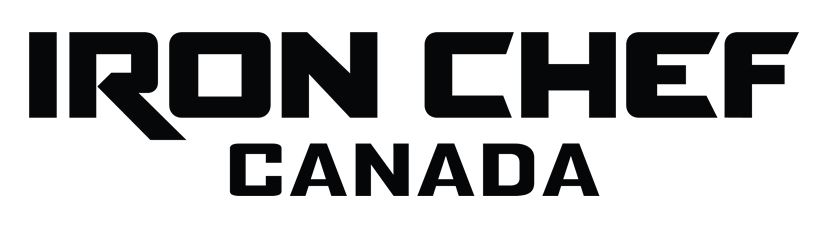
- Genre: Cooking, Game show
- Presented by: Gail Simmons
- Starring: Chris Nuttall-Smith (floor reporter); Jai West (Chairman)
- Country of origin: Canada
- Original language: English
- No. of seasons: 2
- No. of episodes: 20

Production
- Producers: Corus Entertainment; Proper Television
- Camera setup: Multi-camera
- Running time: 60 minutes

Original release
- Network: Food Network
- Release: 17 October 2018 – 30 October 2019

Related
- Iron Chef; Iron Chef America

Iron Chef Canada is a show on Food Network Canada which premiered October 10, 2018. The show is hosted by Gail Simmons, with Chris Nuttall-Smith as the floor reporter, and Jai West as The chairman. The show is produced by Corus Entertainment and based on the popular Iron Chef franchise.

Besides the secret ingredient that has to be featured in every dish, the chairman also introduces a "culinary curveball" in the middle of the competition that has to be used in at least one dish.

The chefs compete in the sponsored "Monogram Kitchen Stadium."

== Development ==
On May 30, 2019, Corus Entertainment renewed Iron Chef Canada for a second season. On the Food Network Canada website, the new episodes are still counted toward the first season.

== Iron Chefs ==
| Iron Chef | Seasons | Win | Loss | Draw | Total | Win % |
|---|---|---|---|---|---|---|
| Hugh Acheson | 1 - 2 | 1 | 2 | 0 | 3 | 33.3% |
| Amanda Cohen | 1 - 2 | 3 | 0 | 0 | 3 | 100.0% |
| Lynn Crawford | 1 - 2 | 3 | 1 | 0 | 4 | 75.0% |
| Rob Feenie | 1 - 2 | 3 | 0 | 1 | 4 | 75.0% |
| Susur Lee | 1 - 2 | 3 | 2 | 0 | 5 | 60.0% |
| Anna Olson | 1 - 2 | 1 | 0 | 0 | 1 | 100.0% |

== Episodes ==
=== Season 1 ===
| # | No. | Original air date | Iron Chef | Challenger | Secret ingredient(s) | Curveball | Winner | Final score |
|---|---|---|---|---|---|---|---|---|
| 1 | 1 | 17 October 2018 | Lynn Crawford | Marc Lepine | Maple | Instant coffee | Lynn Crawford | 72–68 |
| 2 | 2 | 24 October 2018 | Rob Feenie | Ned Bell | Stone fruit | Liquid nitrogen | Rob Feenie | 81–65 |
| 3 | 3 | 31 October 2018 | Susur Lee | Nick Liu | Bitter greens | Canned pumpkin | Susur Lee | 72–70 |
| 4 | 4 | 7 November 2018 | Hugh Acheson | Alex Chen | Tomato | Berbere | Alex Chen | 66–71 |
| 5 | 5 | 14 November 2018 | Amanda Cohen | René Rodriguez | Cauliflower | Nutritional yeast | Amanda Cohen | 79–67 |
| 6 | 6 | 21 November 2018 | Lynn Crawford | Jason Bangerter | Venison | Vegetable sheeter | Jason Bangerter | 72–77 |
| 7 | 7 | 28 November 2018 | Rob Feenie | John Horne | Bivalves | Salt & vinegar potato chips | Rob Feenie | 82–73 |
| 8 | 8 | 5 December 2018 | Susur Lee | Danny Francis | Pork | Cheese curds | Danny Francis | 71–72 |
| 9 | 9 | 12 December 2018 | Anna Olson | Laura White | Nuts | Ginger snap | Anna Olson | 77–75 |
| 10 | 10 | 19 December 2018 | Hugh Acheson | Brandon Olsen | Arctic char | Preserved lemon | Hugh Acheson | 73–70 |

=== Season 2 ===
| # | No. | Original air date | Iron Chef | Challenger | Secret ingredient(s) | Curveball | Winner | Final score |
|---|---|---|---|---|---|---|---|---|
| 1 | 11 | 28 August 2019 | Susur Lee | Stefan Hartmann | Offal | Stout | Susur Lee | 80–62 |
| 2 | 12 | 4 September 2019 | Lynn Crawford | Shane Chartrand | Trout | Montreal bagel | Lynn Crawford | 77–74 |
| 3 | 13 | 11 September 2019 | Hugh Acheson | Nick Hodge | Goat | Mango | Nick Hodge | 64–72 |
| 4 | 14 | 18 September 2019 | Amanda Cohen | Duncan Ly | Eggs | Red pepper jelly | Amanda Cohen | 76–65 |
| 5 | 15 | 25 September 2019 | Rob Feenie | Ivana Raca | Cheddar cheese | Ice wine | Rob Feenie | 79–66 |
| 6 | 16 | 2 October 2019 | Susur Lee | Paul Boehmer | Tiny fish | Soda crackers | Paul Boehmer | 70–77 |
| 7 | 17 | 9 October 2019 | Lynn Crawford | Scott Vivian | Bacon | Dates | Lynn Crawford | 71–59 |
| 8 | 18 | 16 October 2019 | Amanda Cohen | Jonathan Gushue | Squash | Dulce | Amanda Cohen | 76–74 |
| 9 | 19 | 23 October 2019 | Rob Feenie | Fisun Ercan | Beef | Lapsang Souchong Tea | Tie | 73-73 |
| 10 | 20 | 30 October 2019 | Susur Lee | Pino Posteraro | Crab | Cucumber Gin | Susur Lee | 60–54 |
