= East Meets West (TV series) =

- Created by: Ming Tsai
- Starring: Ming Tsai
- Country of origin: United States
- No. of seasons: 5
- No. of episodes: 168

Production
- Running time: 30 minutes

Original release
- Network: Food Network

East Meets West is a cooking show on the Food Network hosted by the Chinese American chef Ming Tsai. During each half-hour episode, Tsai cooked Asian-European fusion cuisine. East Meets West aired from 1998 to 2003. In 1999, Tsai won the Daytime Emmy award in the category Outstanding Service Show Host for the show.

== Opening sequence ==
The opening credits for the show consisted of Tsai doing various things, such as doing yoga, playing tennis, cooking, shopping, hopping out of his van, riding a bicycle, and shopping in an Asian market.

== Episode list ==
- Season 1: 40 Episodes
- Season 2: 43 Episodes
- Season 3: 27 Episodes
- Season 4: 23 Episodes
- Season 5: 35 Episodes
