= Marcela Valladolid =

American chef and author (born 1978)

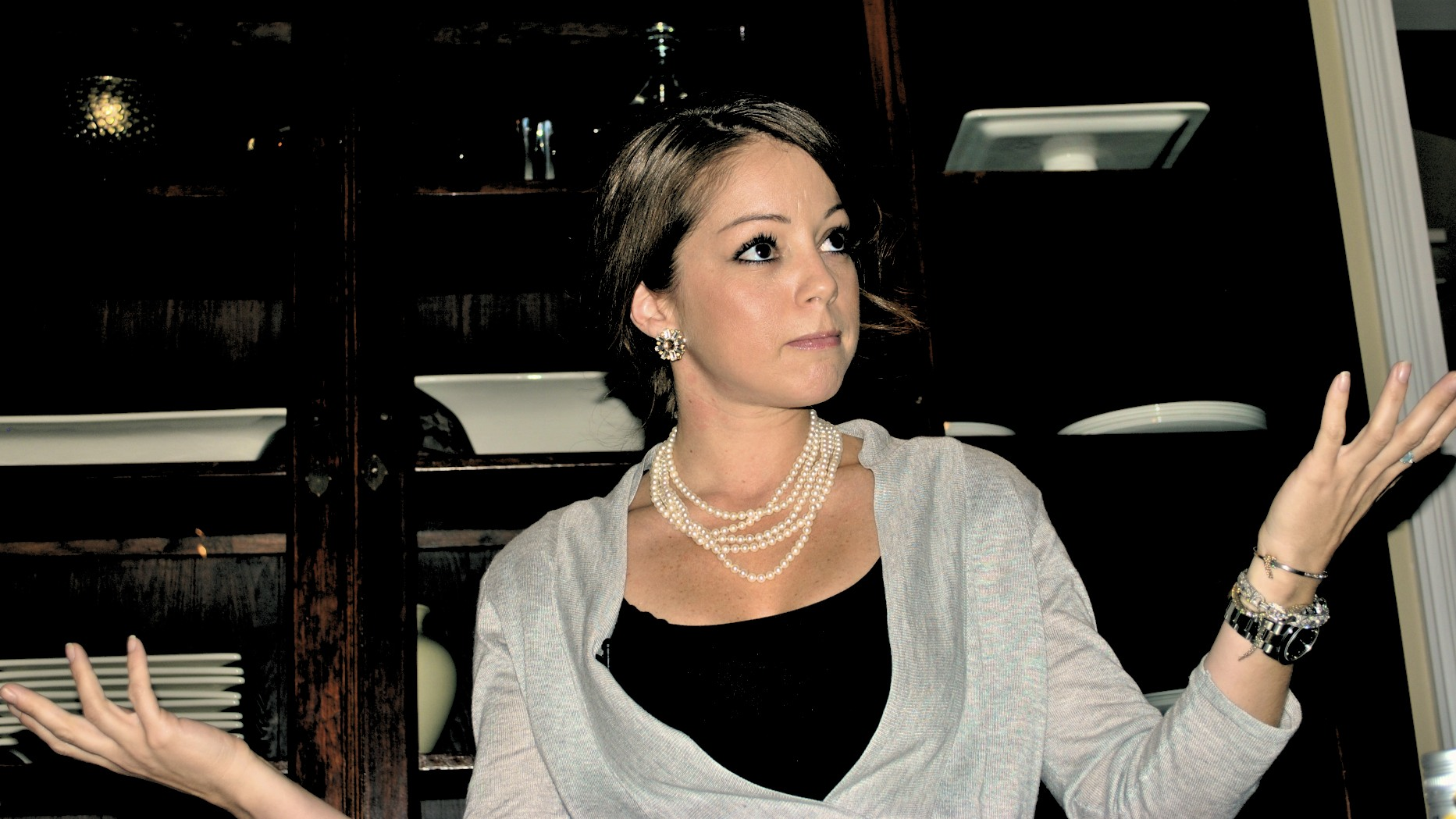
- Valladolid at a 2010 Sauza Tequila Chicago cooking night
- Born: Marcela Luz Valladolid; July 19, 1978 (age 47); San Diego, California, U.S.
- Education: Ritz Escoffier Cooking School; Los Angeles Culinary Institute
- Children: 3
- Culinary career
- Cooking style: Mexican
- Television shows: The American Baking Competition; Best Baker in America; The Kitchen; Kitchen Sink; Mexican Made Easy

Marcela Luz Valladolid (born July 19, 1978) is an American chef and author. She was the host of the Food Network television series Mexican Made Easy, and a judge on the Food Network series Best Baker in America.

== Early life ==
Valladolid was born in San Diego, California. Her interest in pursuing a career as a chef was sparked when she began working at her Aunt Marcela's cooking school in Tijuana, Mexico. Valladolid graduated from the Los Angeles Culinary Institute as a "Certified cook" and then moved to Paris, France, where she graduated as a classically trained pastry chef at the Ritz-Escoffier Cooking School.

She then returned to Tijuana and started her own catering company and taught cooking techniques to classes of 40 students out of her home there.

== Career ==
Valladolid joined the staff of Bon Appétit magazine as an editor and recipe stylist. She also competed on the 2005 series The Apprentice: Martha Stewart, in which she came in fourth place.

Valladolid's first cooking show was Relatos con Sabor on Discovery en Español which aired in the United States and Latin America. In the series, she showed viewers how local Hispanic homes preserve and revive traditional recipes.

Valladolid's first cookbook, Fresh Mexico: 100 Simple Recipes for True Mexican Flavor, debuted in August 2009 and has since received positive reviews.

Valladolid's second cooking show, Mexican Made Easy, debuted in January 2010 on the Food Network. Her second cookbook, Mexican Made Easy, was released in September 2011 as a companion book to the show. Both Valladolid's book and the show, filmed in San Diego, were designed to show the world there is no "yellow cheese" in traditional Mexican cooking and that her Mexican culinary style can be done with "fresh flavor that fits all."

Valladolid has also appeared in other Food Network shows. On Throwdown! with Bobby Flay she was a judge for a fish taco-themed competition. She and Flay teamed up to defeat Masaharu Morimoto and teammate Andrew Zimmern on a New Year's edition of Iron Chef America in 2012. Also in 2012, she competed in a celebrity version of Chopped in which she advanced to the final round and finished second (out of four competitors). In 2013, she served as a judge on Guy's Grocery Games.

Valladolid was one of two judges on the CBS reality TV cooking competition series The American Baking Competition.

On November 27, 2013, Valladolid was a guest model on the Thanksgiving episode of The Price Is Right, and long before that was a contestant in 2004 playing "That's Too Much", winning a car.

In January 2014, Valladolid debuted as one of the co-hosts on Food Network's show The Kitchen. and left the show in October 2017.

== Personal life ==
She has a son named Fausto Gallardo (2004) with her ex-husband Fausto Gallardo, son David Button-Valladolid (2015) and daughter Anna Carina Button-Valladolid (2016) with her current husband Philip Button.

In 2013, Valladolid had a brief affair with her The American Baking Competition co-host Paul Hollywood. Both Valladolid's and Hollywood's spouses subsequently divorced them due to this affair. Hollywood and his wife separated temporarily because of the affair before reconciling, but it was cited in news of their second separation in 2017.
