= Culture in Toronto =

Overview of the culture of Toronto, Canada

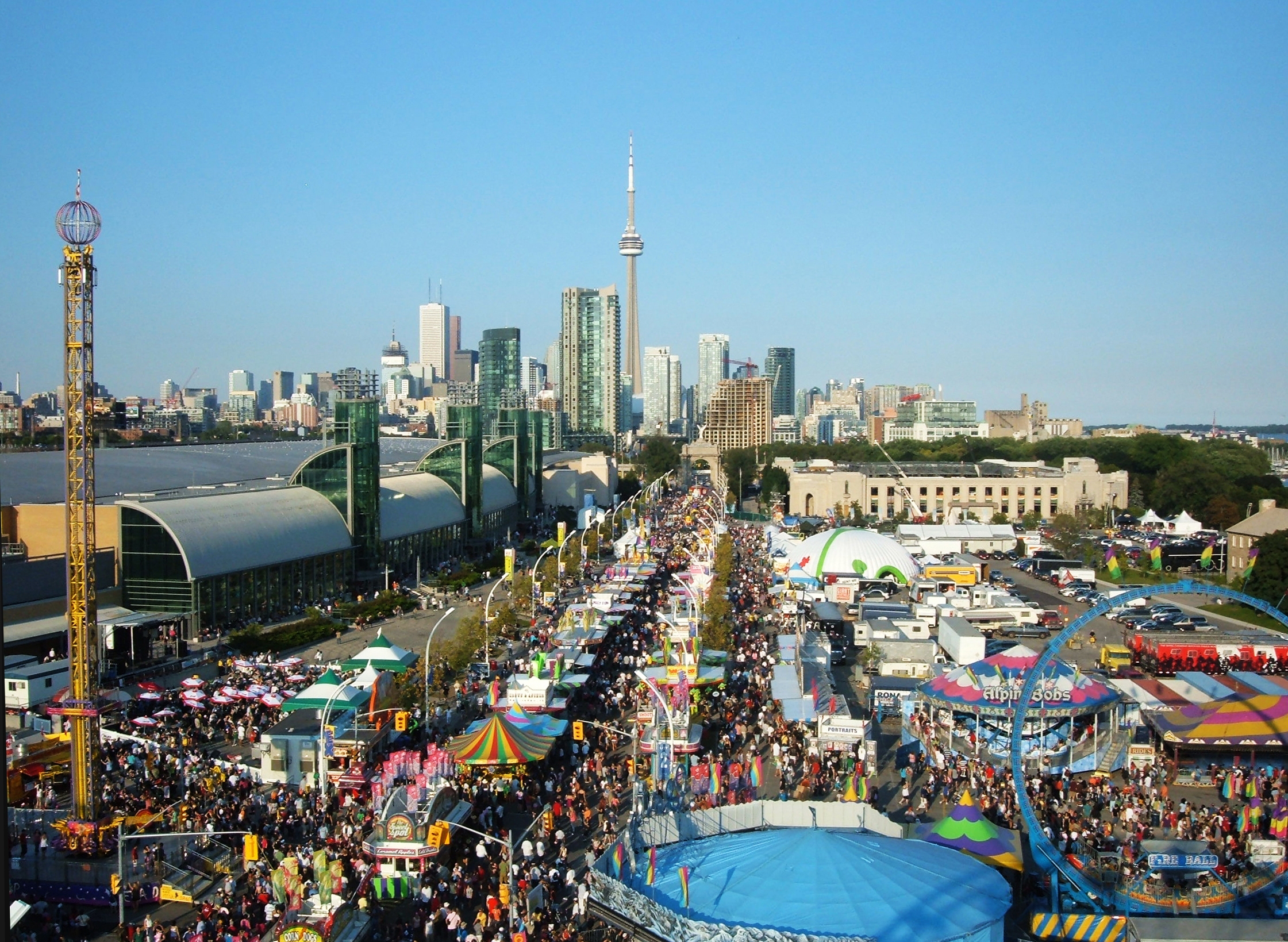
The Canadian National Exhibition is Canada's largest annual fair, and the fifth largest in North America. The CNE remains a focal point of Toronto's culture

Toronto is the largest city in Canada and one of the most multicultural cities in the world. Many immigrant cultures have brought their traditions languages and music to Toronto. Toronto, the capital of the province of Ontario, is a major Canadian city along Lake Ontario's northwestern shore.

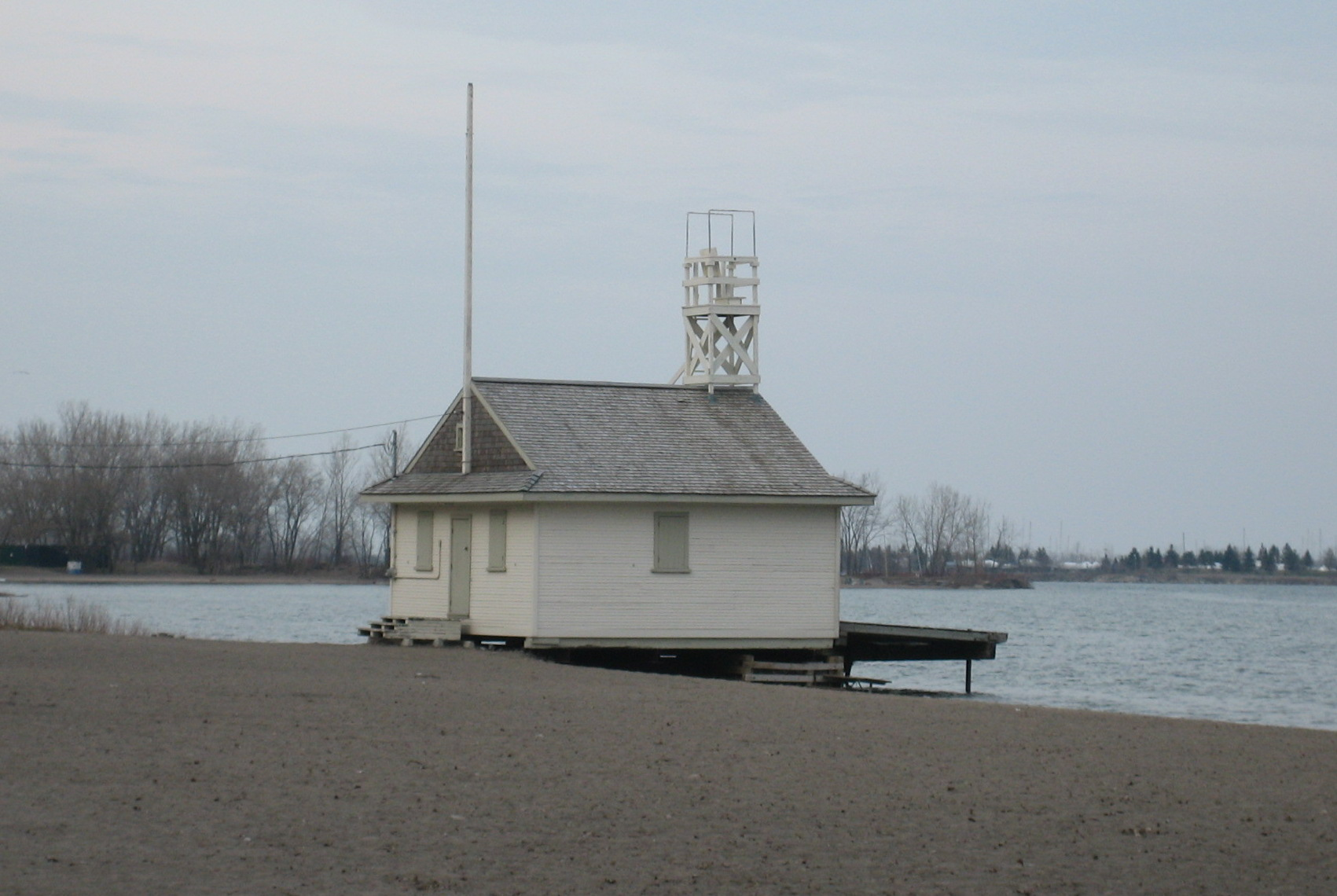
Cherry Beach Toronto

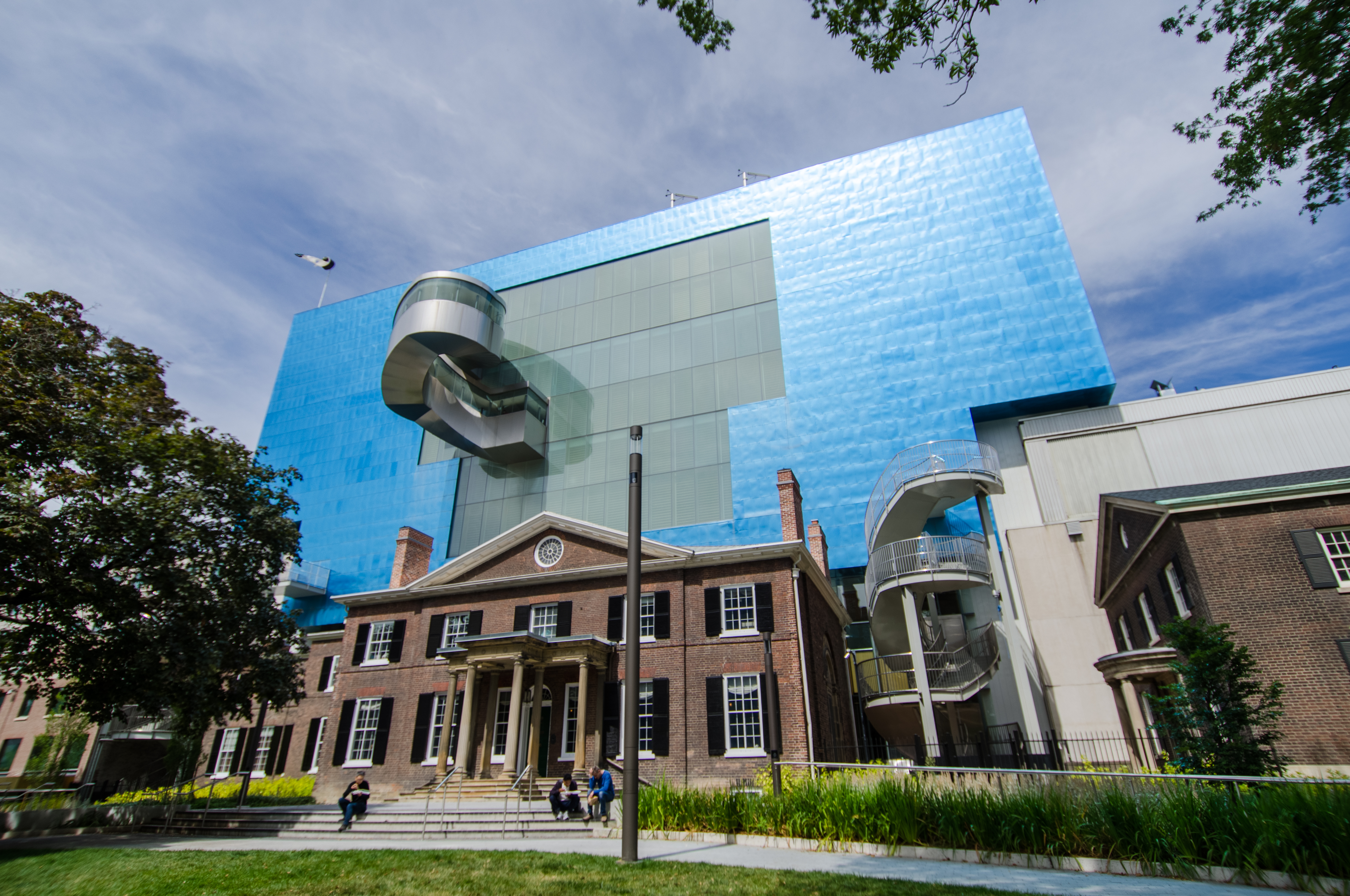
Art Gallery Of Ontario

The city features many distinctive neighbourhoods. Many of these neighbourhoods were originally built as streetcar suburbs in the past and are still vibrant today. This is partially because of an influx of residents in the downtown caused by a large amount of new condominium construction in the city since the mid 2000s.

Toronto is one of the few cities in North America to retain its historic streetcar lines. These streetcars are not just touristic streetcars, but are an integral part of the transit system. This streetcar network crisscrosses the downtown area and some of the suburban parts of the city as well. The city also features many unique neighbourhoods. These include the largest collection of Victorian-era industrial architecture in North America (a legacy from Toronto's past as a major whisky distilling centre), the largest urban car-free community in North America, and the bohemian heart of the city, Kensington Market.

The city features a number of notable festivals. The city is home to the Toronto International Film Festival, one of the largest and most prestigious events of its kind in the world. It is also home to the Hot Docs Canadian International Documentary Festival, the largest documentary festival in North America. The Scotiabank CONTACT photography festival, one of the largest photography festivals in the world, showcases notable photographs from throughout the world. The Toronto International Festival of Authors welcomes authors from throughout the world to promote interest and enthusiasm in writing and reading on both a local and international level. The city also features one of the largest public library systems in the world and unique museums such as the Bata Shoe Museum, the Aga Khan Museum, and the Hockey Hall of Fame.

The city is the third-largest film and television production centre in North America, after Los Angeles and New York, and has the third-largest English language theatre district in the world, after New York and London. Successful television shows shot or set in the city and surrounding areas include Kim's Convenience, Schitt's Creek, SCTV, Kids in the Hall, Orphan Black, and the Degrassi franchise. The city is also home to the OVO Sound recording company and the home of Toronto sound (hip hop). A few famous music artists that have emerged from the city or its suburbs include Peaches, Rush, Drake, Jessie Reyez, Shawn Mendes, Alessia Cara, DillanPonders, K-os, Roam, Sean Leon and The Weeknd.

Dishes that originated in the city or that are unique to it include Peameal bacon, Peameal bacon sandwiches, East Indian rotis, Toronto-style pizza, sushi pizza, and many unique fusion cuisine dishes.

== Film festivals ==
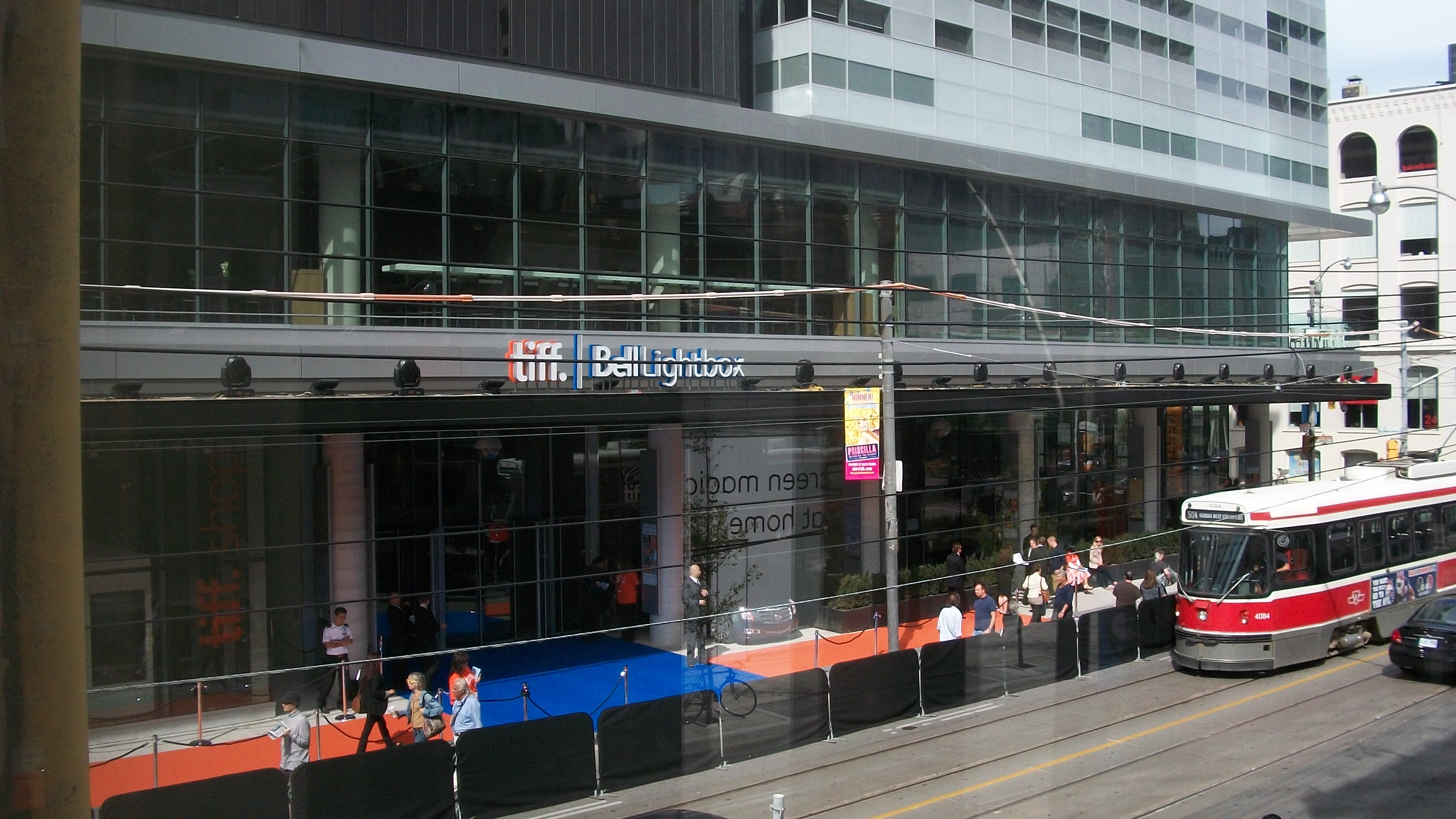
The Toronto International Film Festival is one of the largest publicly attended film festivals in the world. Its organizers operate out of the TIFF Bell Lightbox.

Toronto has one of the highest counts of film festivals in the world. The most well-known is the Toronto International Film Festival (TIFF). Founded in 1976, TIFF is now one of the largest events of its kind in the world. In 1998, Variety magazine acknowledged that TIFF "is second only to Cannes in terms of high-profile pics, stars, and market activity". In 2007, Time noted that TIFF had "grown from its place as the most influential fall film festival to the most influential film festival, period". This is partially the result of the festival's ability and reputation for generating "Oscar buzz".

The festival's People's Choice Award—which is based on audience balloting—has emerged as an indicator of success in awards season, especially at the Academy Awards. Past recipients of this award include Oscar-winning films, such as: Life Is Beautiful, American Beauty, Crouching Tiger, Hidden Dragon, Slumdog Millionaire, The King's Speech, 12 Years a Slave, The Imitation Game, Room, La La Land, Three Billboards Outside Ebbing, Missouri and Green Book.

The TIFF Bell Lightbox opened in 2010 as a permanent headquarters for TIFF. It houses film screenings (mostly Canadian, art-house, international, etc. films), restaurants, and exhibition and gallery spaces. The city is also home to the Hot Docs Canadian International Documentary Festival, which is the largest documentary festival in North America. Other film festivals in Toronto include Inside Out Toronto Lesbian and Gay Film and Video Festival, ReelHeART International Film Festival, Toronto After Dark Film Festival, Toronto Reel Asian International Film Festival, and WILDsound Film Festival. Toronto also has the National Film Board of Canada.

== Art and exhibits ==
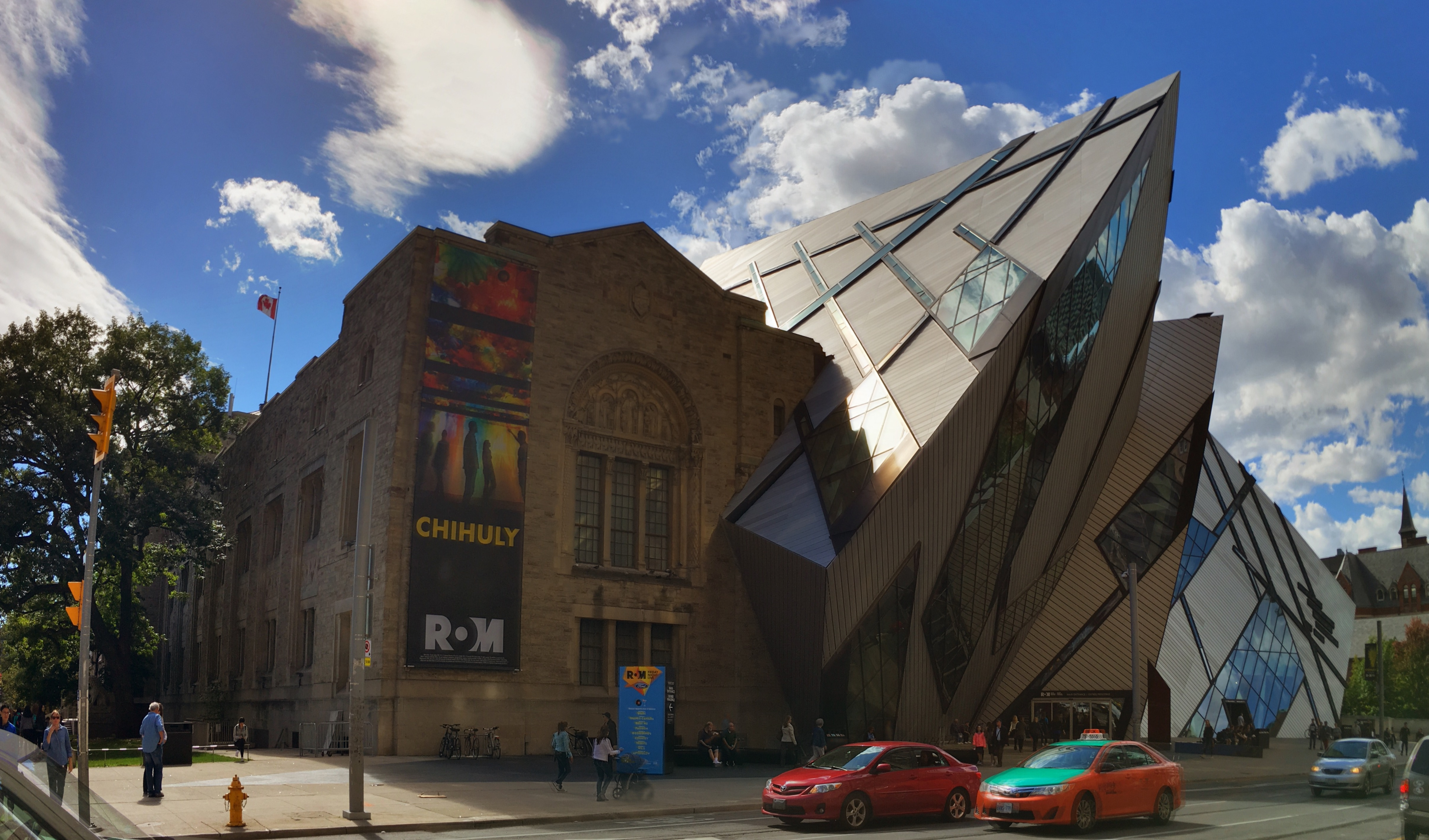
The Royal Ontario Museum is a museum of art, world culture and natural history. It is the largest, and most visited museum in Canada.

Toronto's Royal Ontario Museum ("the ROM") is well known, as well as the Art Gallery of Ontario (the "AGO") which is one of North America's largest.

Toronto holds many other major museums and galleries, such as the Gardiner Museum, Bata Shoe Museum, Design Exchange, Museum of Inuit Art, Museum of Contemporary Canadian Art, Fort York, TIFF Bell Lightbox, Canadian Air and Space Museum, CBC Museum, Hockey Hall of Fame, John Street Roundhouse, Institute for Contemporary Culture, TD Gallery of Inuit Art, Textile Museum of Canada, Harbourfront Centre, Allen Lambert Galleria, Ontario Science Centre and the Aga Khan Museum. There are also museums, such as the Parliament Interpretive Centre, operated by Ontario Heritage Trust, purposed for education about the War of 1812 and the history and anthropology of the province and city.

Prominent art scenes and collections are also found in the city's major institutions, like the Ontario College of Art and Design University, the University of Toronto Art Centre, The Image Centre, and the Art Gallery of York University. The city also runs its own historic museums which include Casa Loma and Spadina House. Lastly, there is also a place called Graffiti Alley, a network of alleyways around Queen St and Spadina Ave that features kilometres of graffiti art.

The governments of Toronto and Ontario also each have collections of important archives, historic artifacts and documents, as well as artworks of significance. The City of Toronto Archives and Archives of Ontario house these in separate buildings, but may be available for public viewing. The Toronto Reference Library also holds historic documents from the world and hosts exhibitions. Toronto also has the largest public library system in the world.

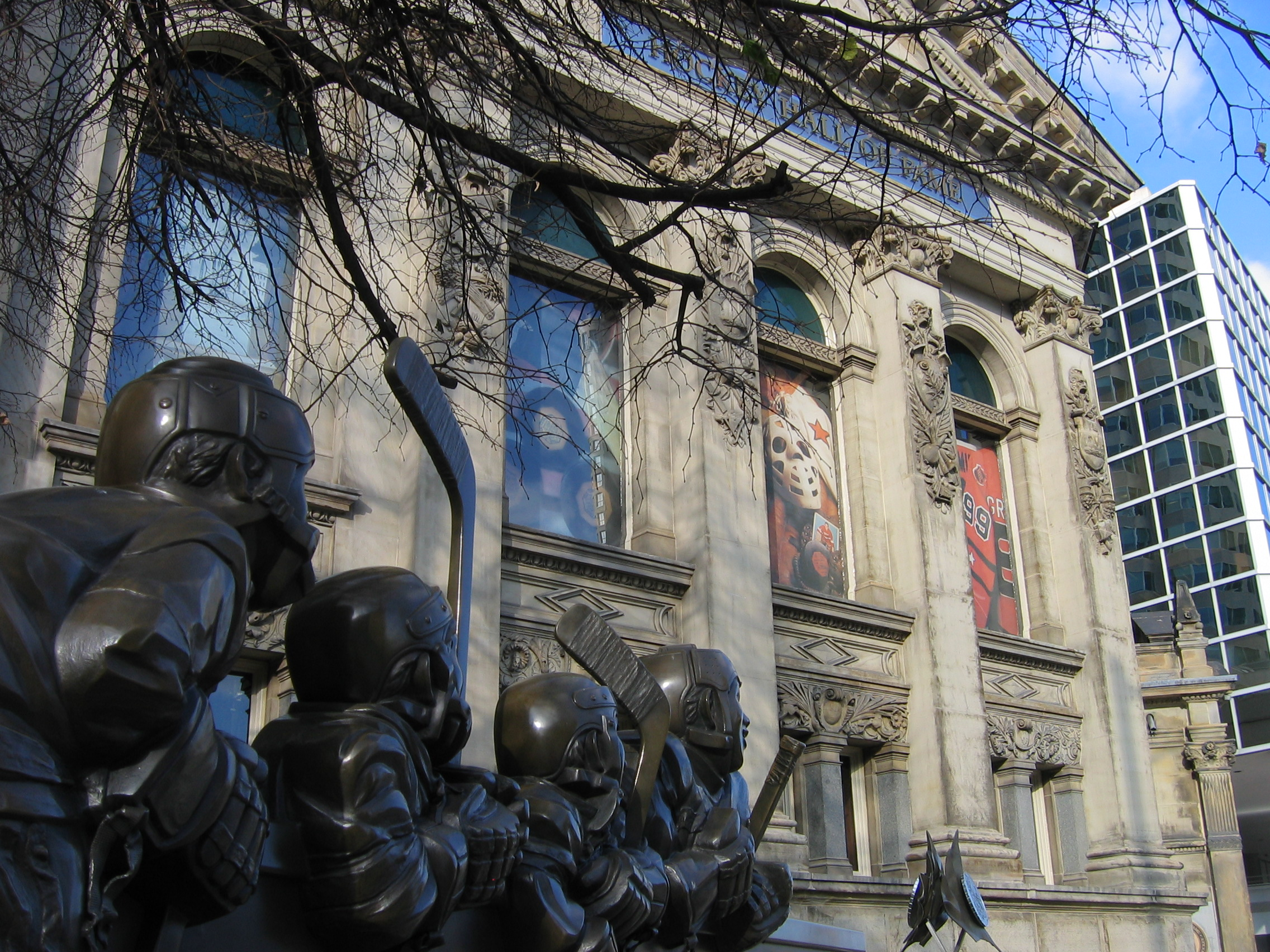
The Hockey Hall of Fame is a museum dedicated to ice hockey, as well as a Hall of Fame.

Some prominent artists who have called Toronto home are Tom Thomson, the Group of Seven members, Douglas Coupland, Shary Boyle, General Idea's members, and Frank Gehry.

Gallery devotees to contemporary art include the Power Plant, Design Exchange, Museum of Contemporary Canadian Art, First Canadian Place gallery and many private galleries in Yorkville, the Distillery District, Queen Street West, The Junction, and elsewhere. Nuit Blanche Toronto is a free celebration of contemporary art which features public art commissions, all-night exhibitions, live performances and programs throughout the city. Luminato is a comparable annual event that runs for ten days at the beginning of June.

During Doors Open Toronto, which takes place annually in May, over 140 buildings of architectural, historic or cultural significance are open to the public for a citywide celebration. The city of Toronto was the first government organization to create this kind of event. The annual Toronto International Art Fair showcases modern, multi-disciplined art with a focus on the latest international developments. The Queen West Art Crawl is an annual weekend-long festival celebrating the arts on Queen Street West. The Toronto Outdoor Art Exhibition is another annual weekend event at Nathan Phillips Square, gathering more than 500 visual artists and craftspeople mainly from Ontario and Quebec. Works including Native art, contemporary sculpture, and architectural models can be seen within the rotunda of Toronto's City Hall. Art is also showcased within the Toronto subway system, most notably on the Sheppard line and stations north of Bloor St, as well as Pearson Airport, featuring international and Canadian art.

Public art and sculpture in the city are abundant, and have representations of many artists like Henry Moore, Richard Serra, Sol LeWitt, Menashe Kadishman, Douglas Coupland, Bernard Schottlander, Jaume Plensa, Rowan Gillespie, William McElcheran, Joe Fafard, and traditional Inuit art, among others. Public art also finds a home at the Toronto Sculpture Garden, with its temporary outdoor exhibitions. The Princess of Wales Theatre also has the largest work of American painter Frank Stella, with 10 000 sq. ft of his works found inside the structure, as well as a large mural at the sides of it.

Exhibition Place is the home of both the Canadian National Exhibition, a large annual outdoor fair, and the Canadian International Air Show. Nearby Ontario Place is a popular amusement park on the waterfront.

A vibrant visual arts scene includes several artist-run cooperatives regularly presenting contemporary art exhibitions.

ArtsScene, a group hosted by Business for the Arts, an alliance of banks and insurance companies, aims to encourage more young business professionals to engage with the arts. ArtsScene holds monthly events at different arts organizations, organizes events to arrange volunteer board and committee memberships in Canadian arts and heritage organizations, and maintains a website to connect potential volunteers online with arts organizations. The city has bid for Expo '98 and Expo 2000, losing both times.

Toronto's fashion scene is primarily focused in Queen West, King West, and Yorkville. The city has LG Fashion Week, and also recently has had "Rogue Fashion Week" for designers who choose not to show with the official festival. There is also a Fashion Film Festival.

== Performing arts ==
Toronto is home to Canada's most active English language theatre scene; indeed, the Canadian actor, playwright and theatre critic David Gardner has claimed: "With over 168 nonprofit companies and a host of independent commercial enterprises, Toronto has emerged as the world's third-largest centre for English-language theatre, behind only London and New York."

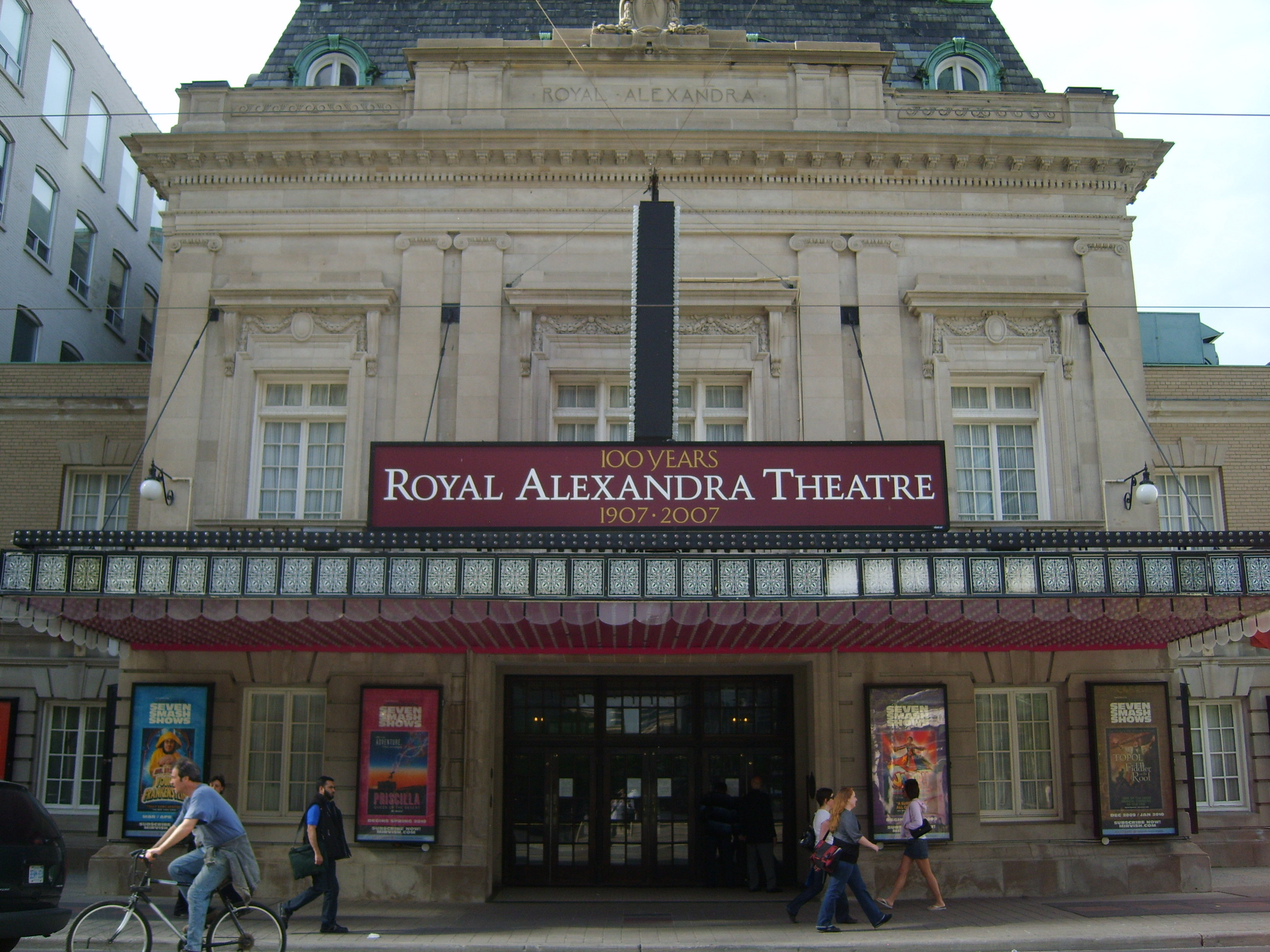
Opened in 1907, the Royal Alexandra Theatre is the oldest continuously operating theatre in North America. Toronto is the third largest centre for English-language theatre, behind only London, and New York.

Toronto's Soulpepper Theatre Company regularly stages classic works by Ibsen, Chekhov and Shakespeare, while the Canadian Stage Company has mounted performances of Shirley Valentine, Frankenstein and It's a Wonderful Life. Harold Green Jewish Theatre has staged such pieces as Kindertransport and Tuesdays with Morrie. Tarragon Theatre not only has performed pieces by Strindberg, Chekhov, etc., but has helped playwrights to develop and stage new works.

Several Broadway theatrical hits originated in Toronto, such as the 1993 revival of Show Boat and Ragtime. Venues for theatre include the historic Canon Theatre (formerly the "Pantages"), the Elgin and Winter Garden Theatres, the Princess of Wales Theatre, the Royal Alexandra Theatre, the Poor Alex Theatre, and the Harbourfront Centre. Theatres such as The Factory Theatre and Theatre Passe Muraille aim to produce distinctly Canadian theatre and have nurtured local artists including George F. Walker, Michael Healey and Ann-Marie MacDonald.

Other prominent venues include St Lawrence Centre for the Performing Arts, Young Centre for the Performing Arts, Young People's Theatre, Imperial Oil Opera Theatre, and the Royal Conservatory of Music.

Musical venues in Toronto include Roy Thomson Hall, home to Toronto Symphony Orchestra (TSO); the Toronto Centre for the Arts in North York; Sony Centre for the Performing Arts, (previously the Hummingbird Centre) and Massey Hall. The Canadian Opera Company built Canada's first purpose-built opera house, the Four Seasons Centre, which opened in 2006. The National Ballet of Canada, which had previously appeared at the Sony Centre with the COC, also moved into the Four Seasons Centre at the same time. The city is also home to the renowned Toronto Children's Chorus.

As Canada's recording industry centre, Toronto is also home to many Canadian pop, rock, and hip hop musicians. Live music is centred primarily in the Entertainment District on Queen Street West, though many music venues exist in other neighbourhoods. Established acts play at venues such as Lee's Palace, The Opera House, The Horseshoe Tavern, The Mod Club, The Phoenix Concert Theatre, The Guvernment and Kool Haus. Major concert tours usually book into larger venues such as Air Canada Centre, Sony Centre for the Arts, Rogers Centre and Molson Amphitheatre at Ontario Place.

The Toronto Music Garden, designed with Yo-Yo Ma as a consultant, also hosts free outdoor orchestras in the summer.

Toronto hosts the annual Toronto Student Film Festival. TSFF is a free submission film festival, that screens short films created by students 12–18 years old. This festival attracts submissions from across the world.

== Literature ==
The Greater Toronto Area is the centre of English Canadian literature, and a list of fiction set in Toronto reveals many titles by writers such as Margaret Atwood, Michael Ondaatje, Robertson Davies, M. G. Vassanji and Timothy Findley. Other prominent Toronto-based writers include Marshall McLuhan, Rohinton Mistry, Morley Callaghan, Michael Ignatieff, George Elliott Clarke and the late George Faludy and Jane Jacobs. Canada's mostly Toronto-based English-language publishing industry includes McClelland and Stewart and smaller firms like House of Anansi Press, Key Porter Books and Coach House Books. Since 1974 the Toronto Book Awards have honoured authors of books evocative of Toronto. PEN Canada is an activist group working since 1926 in defence of freedom of expression throughout the world. North America's largest literary festival, the annual International Festival of Authors, takes place each fall in Toronto.

Canada's main English-language national newspaper, The Globe and Mail, as well as the National Post and Canada's largest-circulating daily newspaper, the Toronto Star, are based in Toronto, as are many other major magazines and periodicals.

== Tourism events ==
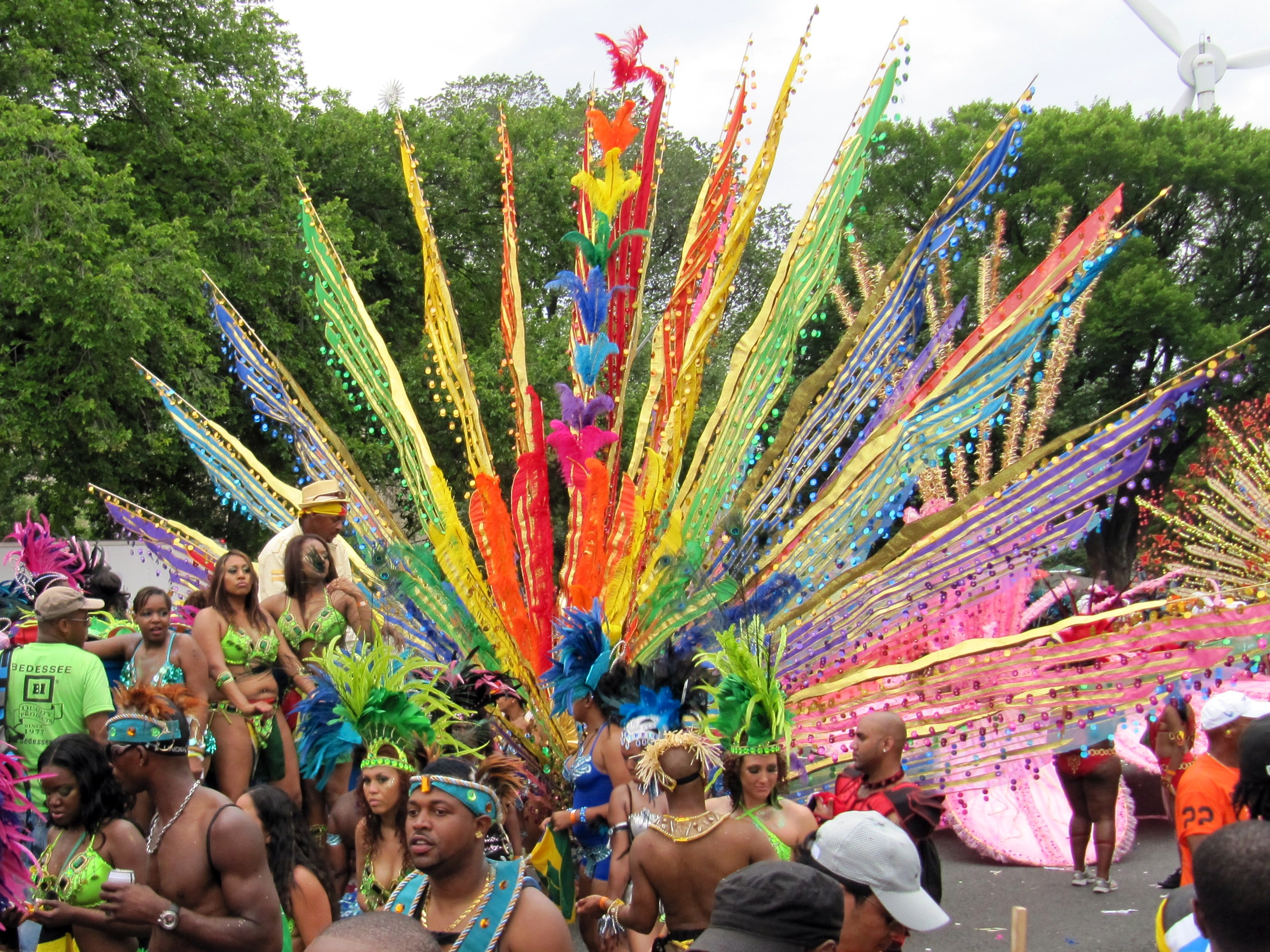
Caribana is a festival of Caribbean culture and traditions. Held each summer in the city, it is North America's largest street festival.

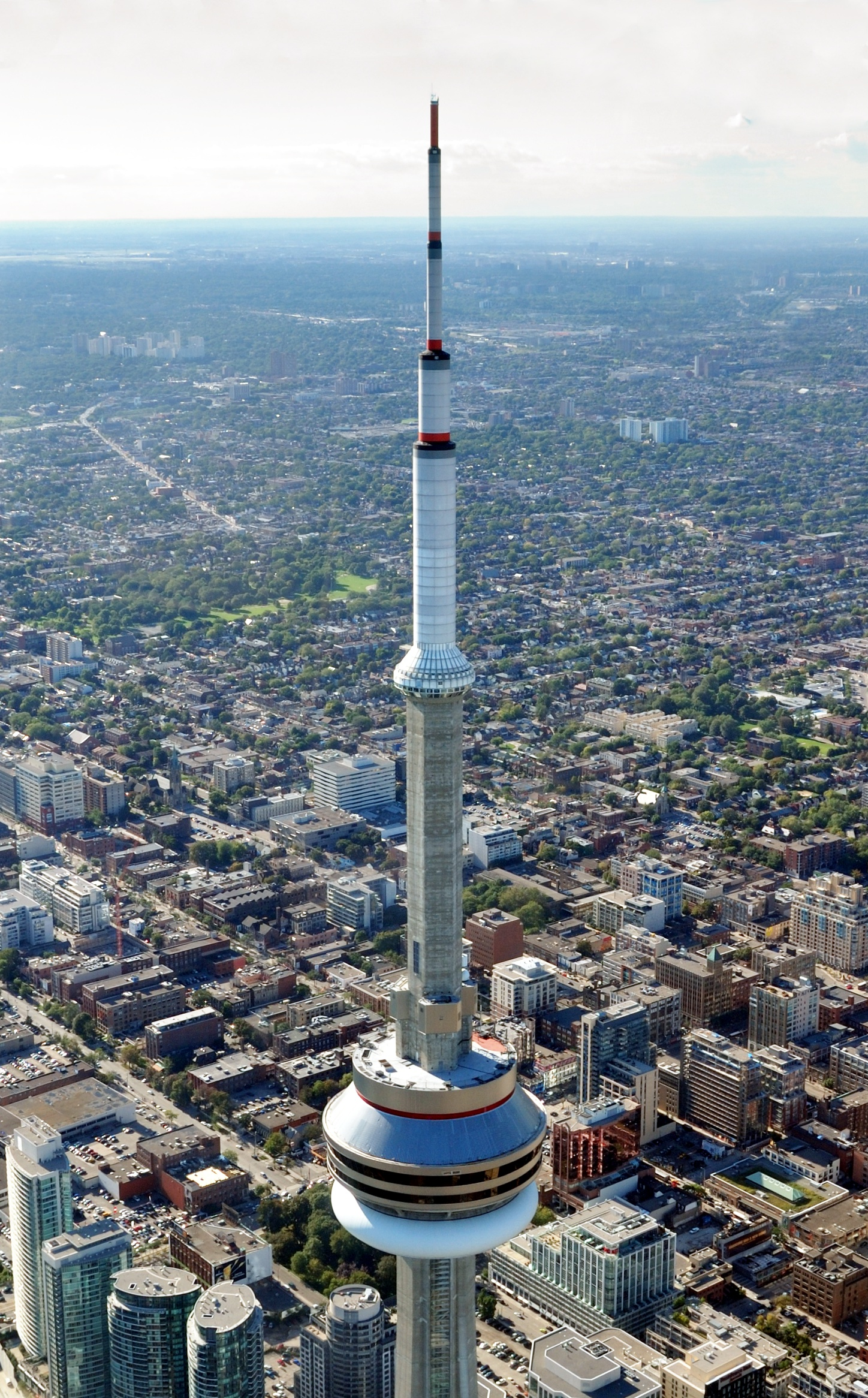
Tip of the iconic CN Tower, formerly the world's tallest free-standing structure

Toronto's most iconic landmark is the CN Tower. The tourism industry has not fully recovered from a 2003 SARS outbreak, while the strong Canadian dollar and tighter Canadian customs controls influenced by U.S. homeland security paranoia have resulted in fewer US visitors, while tourists from overseas continue to increase.

Toronto plays host to a variety of different events year-round. In September, Hollywood actors, writers, directors and producers descend on the city for the Toronto International Film Festival, which competes with other major film festivals at Cannes, Venice and the Sundance Festival.

Luminato is a 10-day festival in June featuring over a thousand local and international artists for theatre, dance, music, visual arts, books and film events. In July, Caribana, the largest Caribbean festival in North America, attracts more than a million people for the concerts, the food, the King and Queen of the Bands competition, and the popular Caribana parade. The Ontario civic holiday – called Colonel By Day in Ottawa, Peter Robinson Day in Peterborough and Simcoe Day in Toronto and in most of Ontario – is named after the first Lieutenant Governor of Upper Canada, John Graves Simcoe.

The last week of June is Pride Toronto. The week is celebrated with a Pride Parade and a Dyke March, along with various other pro-LGBT events, and rivals similar Gay pride events in Montreal, San Francisco, Sydney and São Paulo.

== Toronto Downtown ==
Downtown Toronto is home to attractions like the CN Tower, St. Lawrence Market, and the Royal Ontario Museum, with exhibits on natural history. Bloor Street is an upscale shopping area, and the Eaton Centre is a huge, multistory mall. On the lake, the Harbourfront area has parks and cultural venues.

== Food ==
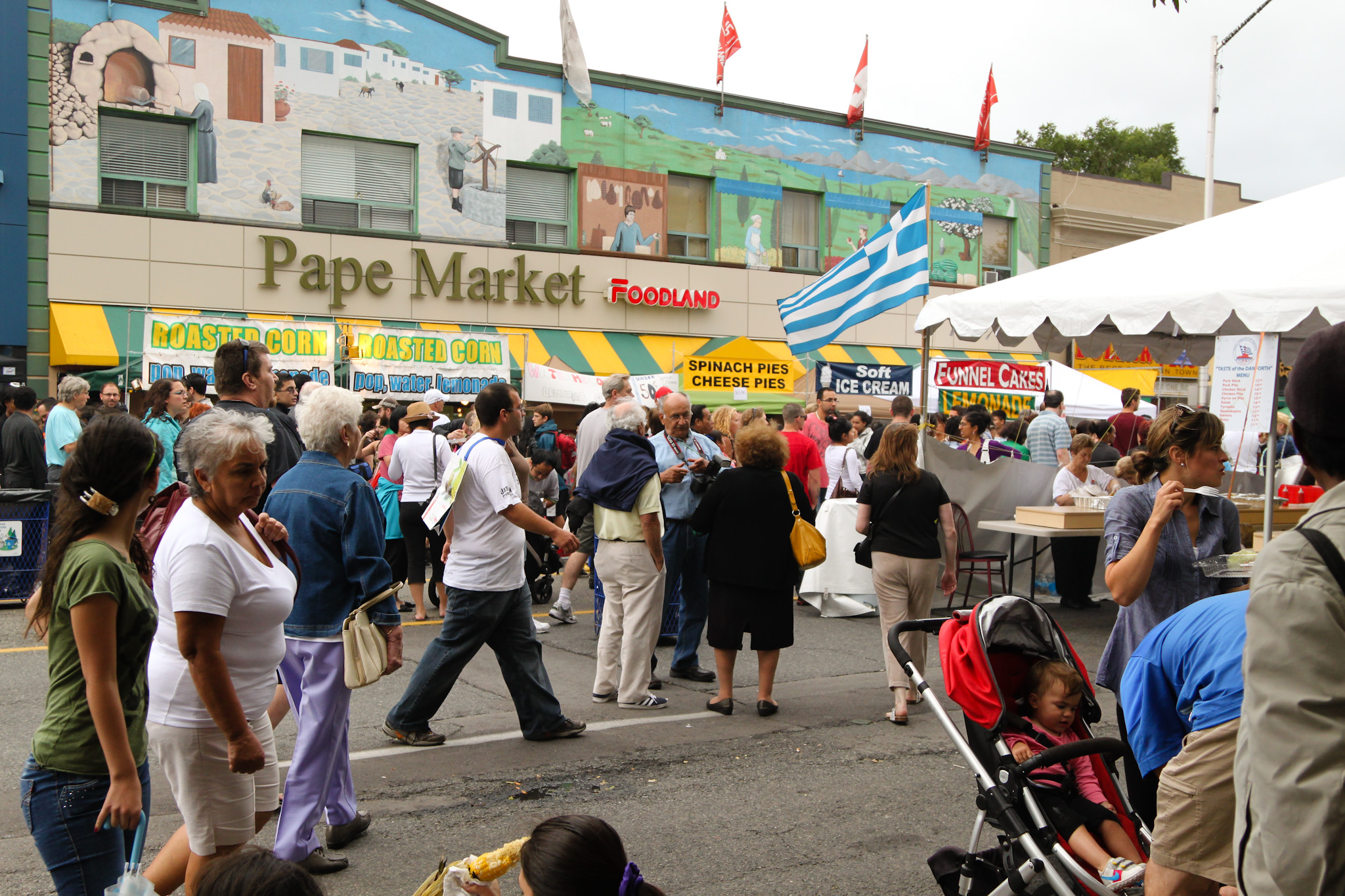
The Taste of Danforth is a yearly festival held Greektown along Danforth Avenue. Typically held in August, the festival celebrates Greek cuisine.

Toronto's cosmopolitan atmosphere is reflected in its cuisine, with many world cooking styles represented. The city celebrates its ethnic diversity through numerous food festivals:

- Summerlicious and Winterlicious – citywide festivals celebrating culinary diversity
- Taste of Danforth – Greek
- Corso Italia – Italian
- Toronto Chinatown Festival – Chinese
- Rib Fest – Etobicoke, Scarborough
- Taste of Lawrence – Caribbean, Lebanese
- Toronto's Festival of Beer
- Sante Wine Festival
- Salsa on St. Clair – Latin American
- Festival of South Asia – Bangladeshi, Indian, Pakistani, Sri Lankan

=== Unique dishes ===
==== Peameal bacon sandwich ====
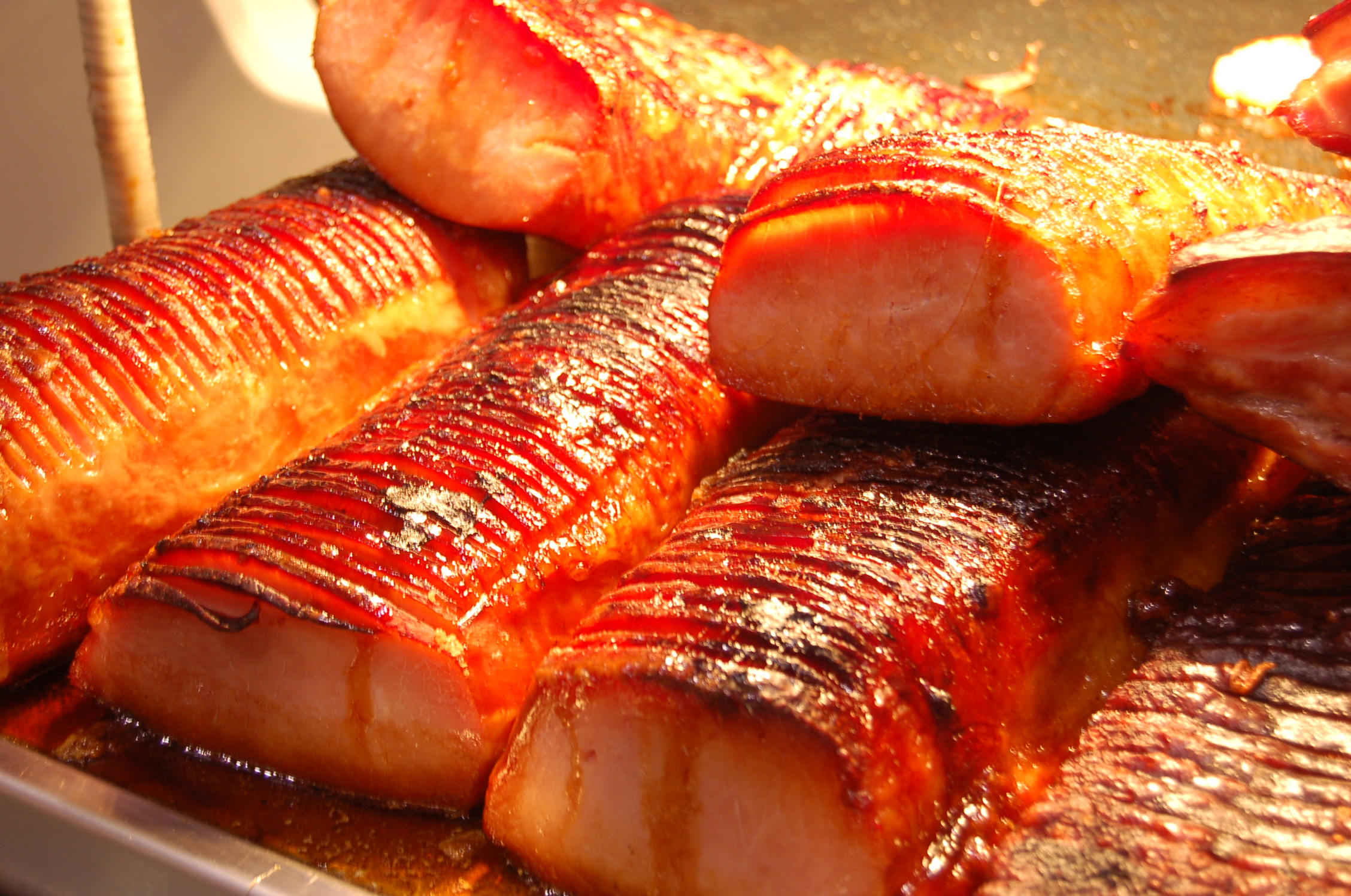
Peameal bacon was a type of back bacon developed by Toronto-based William Davies Company. Today the peameal bacon sandwich is considered a staple of St. Lawrence Market.

Perhaps one of the most iconic and distinct Toronto offerings is the peameal bacon sandwich, normally on a Kaiser. Peameal bacon was originally developed by William Davies at the St. Lawrence Market. Some notable offerings of the sandwich are Paddington's Pump, Sausage King, and Carousel Bakery; coincidentally enough, all are located at St. Lawrence Market. Further east in Leslieville is Rashers, billed as North America's only bacon sandwich shop, recently opened and sells a peameal bacon sandwich that Toronto Life describes as "Toronto's iconic sandwich done right".

==== East Indian roti ====
Another distinct Toronto offering is the "East Indian roti", a variation on the stuffed roti from the West Indies. Owing to Toronto's considerable immigrant populations from both the Caribbean islands and the Indian subcontinent, a hybrid dish has been developed, using South Asian bread and curries as stuffing, for the otherwise West Indian dish.

==== Toronto-style pizza ====
This type of pizza is available in certain restaurants in the Toronto area. It consists of thin-crust pizza brushed with garlic oil. Many of the restaurants that offer this type of pizza have a brush on the counter to allow customers to brush the garlic oil on their slice of pizzas themselves. This style of pizza was invented by Vietnamese immigrants who learned pizza-making from the former Italian owners that they worked for in Toronto. These immigrants were originally from the city of Hue in Vietnam.

==== Others ====
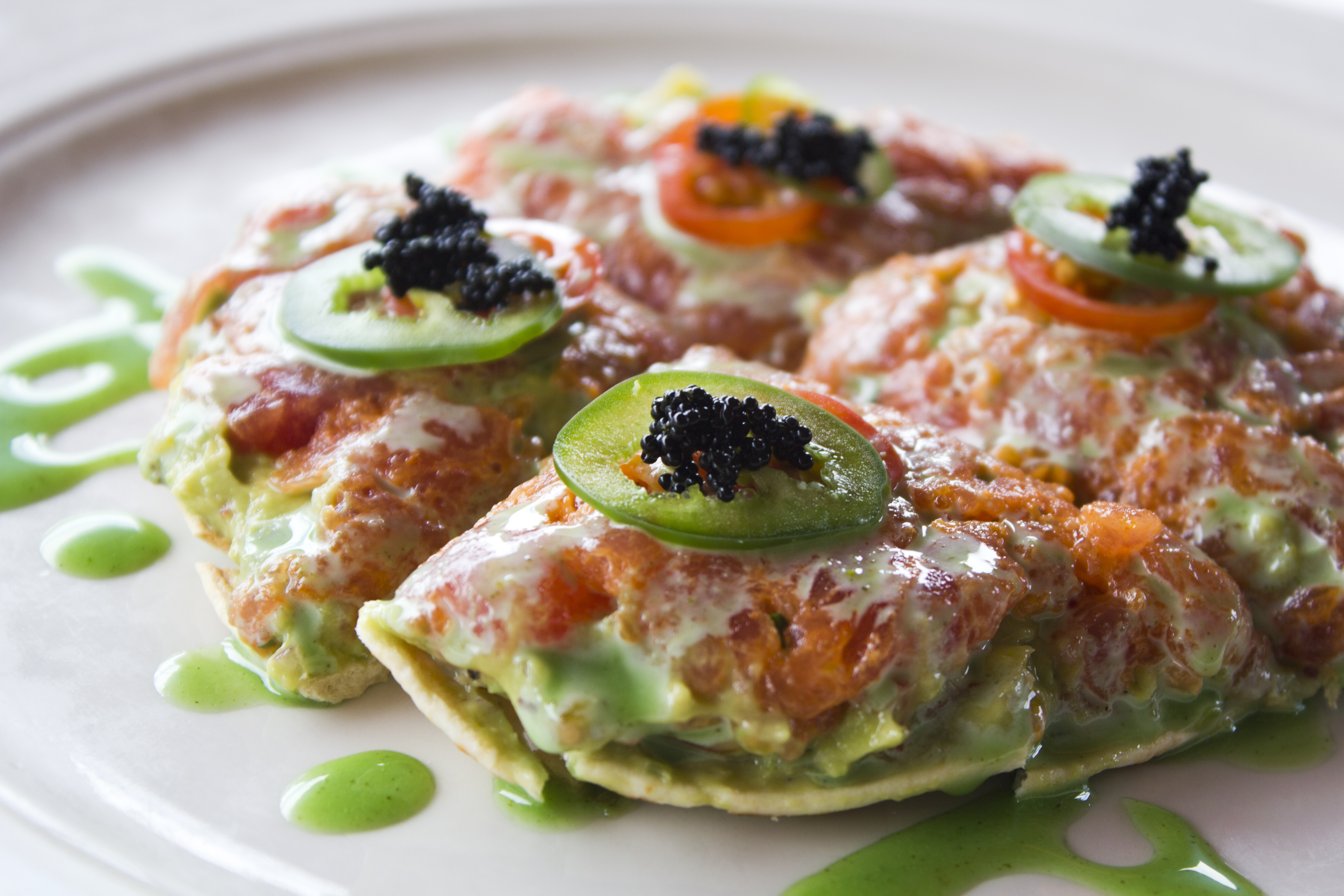
Sushi pizza

- Sushi pizza, a hybrid of sushi and pizza invented in the early 1990s.

== Neighbourhoods ==
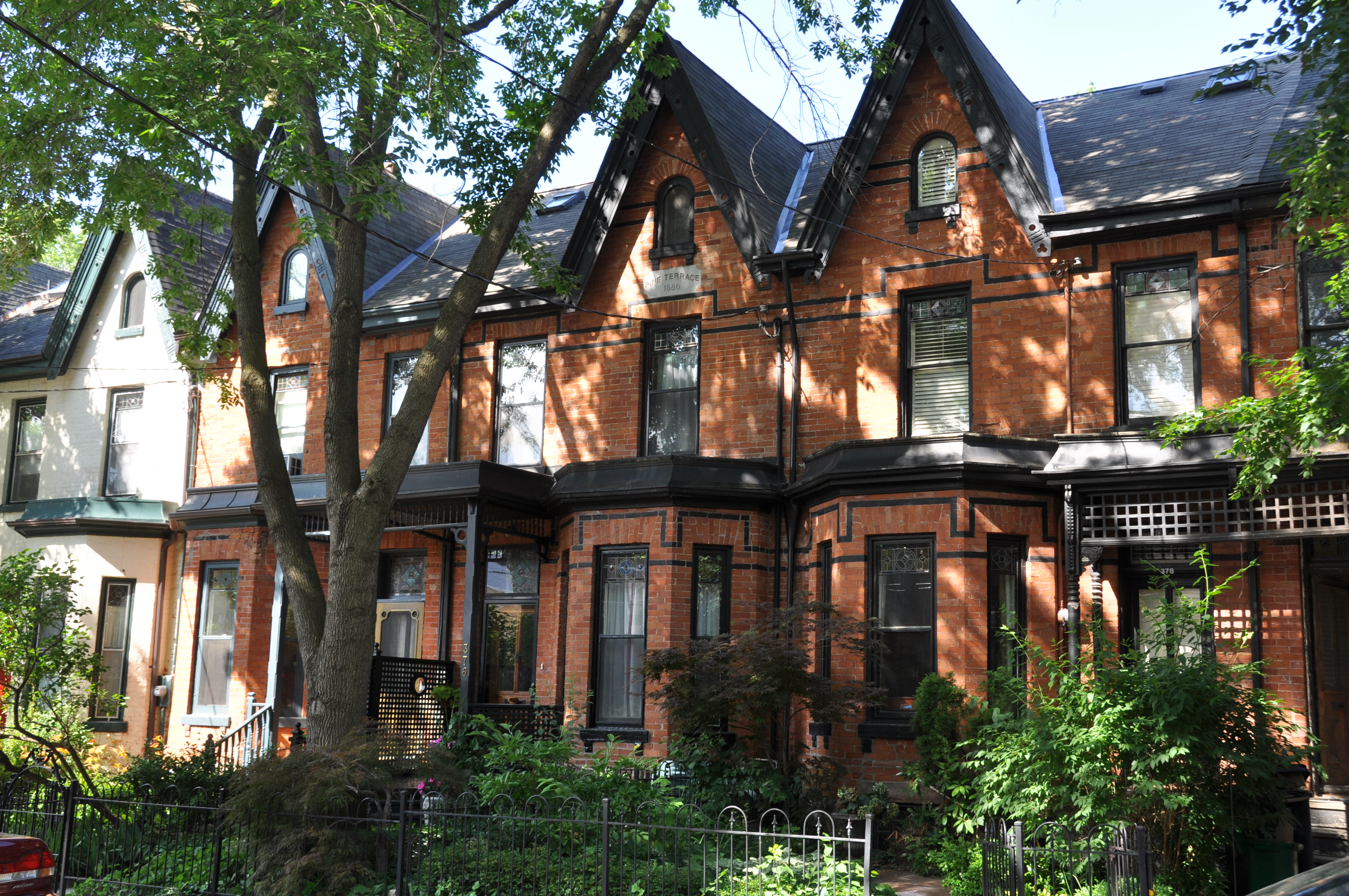
Victorian-era bay-and-gable homes, an architectural style unique to the city. Most houses in the neighbourhoods of the "old city" and its "inner ring" consist of pre-World War II homes.

Toronto bills itself "the city of neighbourhoods" because of their continuing strength and vitality within the metropolis. The city has over 240 distinct neighbourhoods within its boundaries. Residential communities express a character distinct from commercial skyscrapers, and Victorian- and Edwardian-era residential buildings can be found in enclaves such as Rosedale, Forest Hill, Cabbagetown, The Annex, the Bridle Path and Moore Park.

A neighbourhood for tourists and locals alike in Toronto is Kensington Market. This neighbourhood features shops, cafes, and restaurants. Some of these shops are built inside old Victorian bay-and-gable townhomes.

Before 1998, Toronto proper was a much smaller municipality and formed part of the regional district of Metropolitan Toronto. When the city amalgamated that year, Toronto absorbed the former municipalities of York, East York, North York, Etobicoke and Scarborough. Each of these former municipalities still maintains a certain distinctness, and residents still use the names of these municipalities. The area known as Toronto before the amalgamation is sometimes called Old Toronto, the Central District or simply "Downtown".

The "old" City of Toronto is the business centre and is, by far, the most populous and dense part of the city. The "inner ring" suburbs of York and East York are older, middle-income and ethnically diverse areas. Much of the housing stock in these areas consists of old pre-war single-family houses, terraced houses, such as the uniquely Torontonian bay-and-gable housing style, and post-war high-rises. Many of the neighbourhoods in these areas were built up as streetcar suburbs and contain many dense and mixed-use streets. They share many characteristics with sections of the "old" city that are outside of the downtown core. The "outer ring" suburbs of Etobicoke, Scarborough, and North York are much more suburban but are developing urban centres of their own, such as North York Centre around Mel Lastman Square.

== Ravines and parks ==
=== Ravine system ===
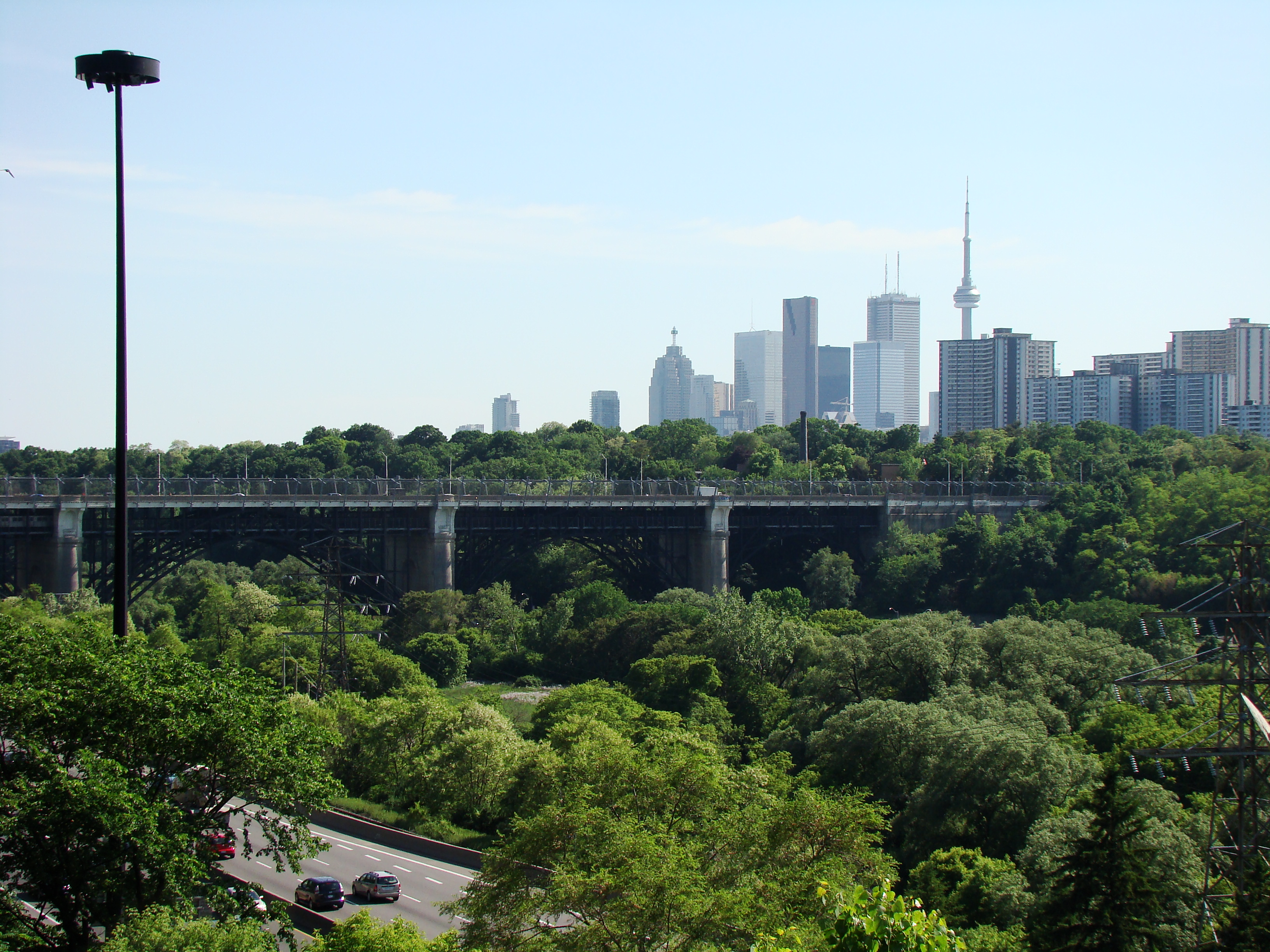
The Toronto ravine system is a distinct feature of Toronto's geography. Initially a barriers towards development, they've since become central to city's landscape.

The ravine system, a distinctive feature of the geography of Toronto, is a network of deep ravines forming an urban forest that runs throughout much of the city. For the most part designated as parkland, the ravines are largely undeveloped. Toronto's ravines have been presented as central to Toronto's character. Architect Larry Richards describes Toronto as topographically being "San Francisco turned upside down." They appear in the works of major Toronto writers such as Margaret Atwood, Anne Michaels, Morley Callaghan and Ann-Marie MacDonald. Robert Fulford has declared: The ravines are the chief characteristic of the local terrain, its topographical signature. Canadian journalist Robert Fulford had described the ravine system as "both a tangible (though often hidden) part of our surroundings and a persistent force in our civic imagination. They are the shared subconscious of the municipality, the places where much of the city's literature is born."

=== Parks ===
The City of Toronto government operates a number of parks and gardens, in an effort to improve the livability of the city. The Toronto and Region Conservation Authority (TRCA), a conservation authority that manages the watershed of the Greater Toronto Area, also manages several conservation areas in the city, including Black Creek Pioneer Village, and the Leslie Street Spit.

In addition to the parks and gardens operation by the municipal government and the TRCA, the city is also home to a number of provincial and nationally operated parks. Provincial parks includes Trillium Park, a park located at the former theme park grounds of Ontario Place and Queen's Park, is located in downtown Toronto. Opened in 1860, Queen's Park is the site of the Ontario Legislative Building. Two parks in Toronto are operated by federally-funded agencies. Managed by the Canada Lands Company, Downsview Park, was originally a Canadian Forces base, CFB Downsview was closed in 1996, and re-purposed to an urban park in 1998. In addition, the eastern portion of the city is also home to Rouge National Urban Park, a national park managed by Parks Canada.

== Nightlife ==
The city's art community attracts and has top theatre groups, galleries, and other high culture attractions.

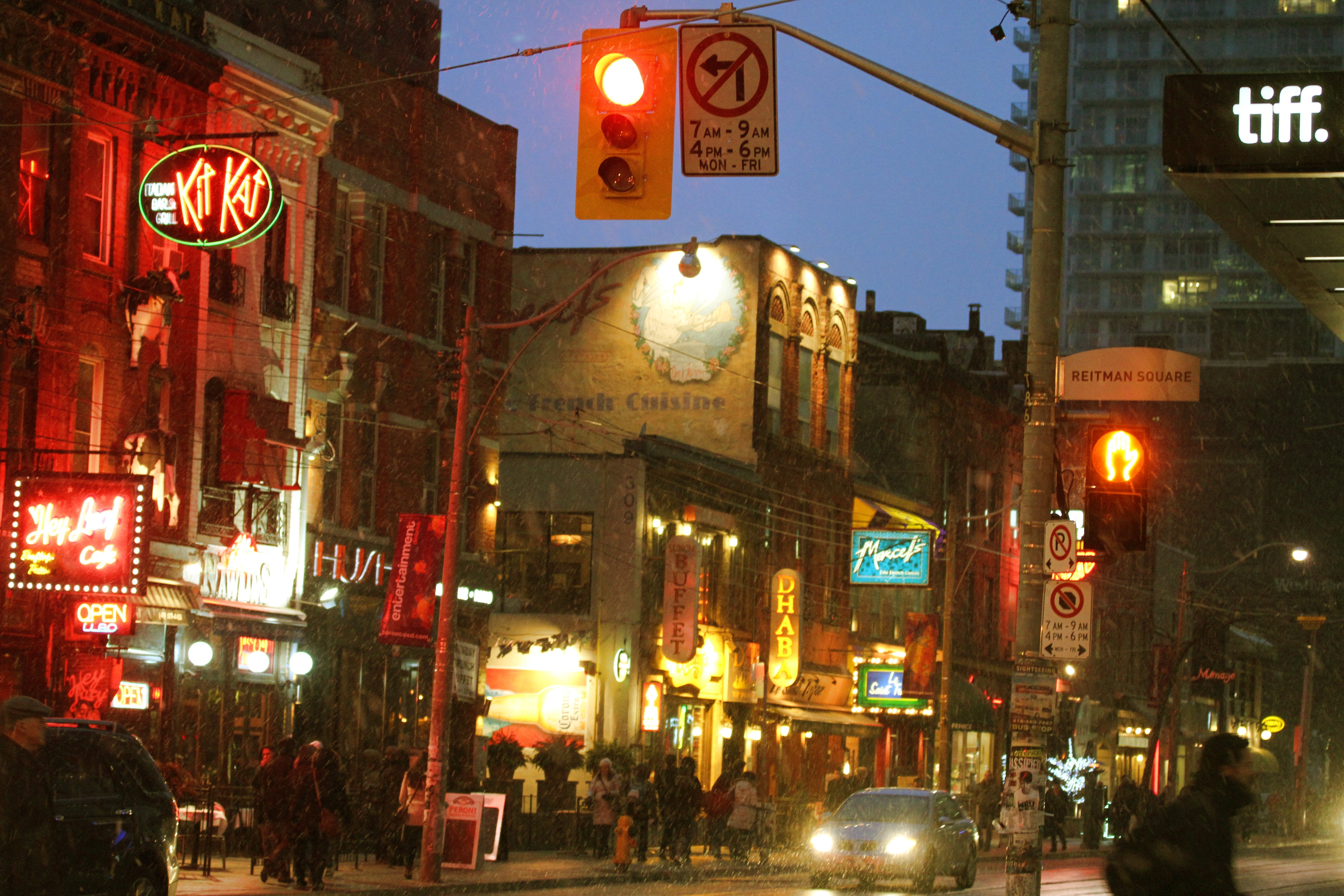
A view of the nightlife in the Entertainment District in Downtown Toronto.

The bar scene is housed in many different sections of the city, each with its own flavour and type of patrons. The "Entertainment District," however, has the highest concentration of nightclubs, bars, and restaurants in the city. There are approximately 90 nightclubs located in this one square kilometre area.

With recent condominium developments in the Entertainment District, many condo tenants have made noise complaints against nightclubs and their rowdy patrons. Condo tenants are pressing for nightclub owners to move away from the newly established residential areas. However, the Entertainment district is still a nightlife destination, and there are many other areas in the city that are becoming increasingly popular at night. Subsequently, many nightclubs have moved along King Street West between Spadina Avenue and Bathurst Street.

Other neighbourhoods that come alive at night include "The Annex" (serving the university student population), "Little Italy" on College Street, "Yonge and Eglinton", "Church and Wellesley", "Queen West" (between Spadina Avenue and Bathurst Street), "West Queen West" (between Bathurst and Dufferin) "Greektown," and the "St. Lawrence Market" neighbourhood (the numerous bars and restaurants on Front Street East and The Esplanade). Ossington Avenue and Dundas Street West have become nightlife destinations that attract mainly young hip, bohemian-type patrons. Parkdale, another hip westside neighborhood known for its affordable housing stock and resilient, creative community, has gained nightlife popularity thanks to notable venues such as The Rhino, Guu Izakaya, AMPM, 3 Dollar Bill, Virginia Cocktail Bar and Tilt Arcade Bar in addition to also containing Noble Street Studios where numerous famous musicians such as Billy Talent, Kanye West, Shawn Mendes, Drake, Usher and The Weeknd have worked on music.

The city's many dance and live music venues host international and Canadian performers, and its comedy clubs have served as training grounds for stars such as Jim Carrey, Russell Peters, The Kids in the Hall and SCTV.

== Music ==
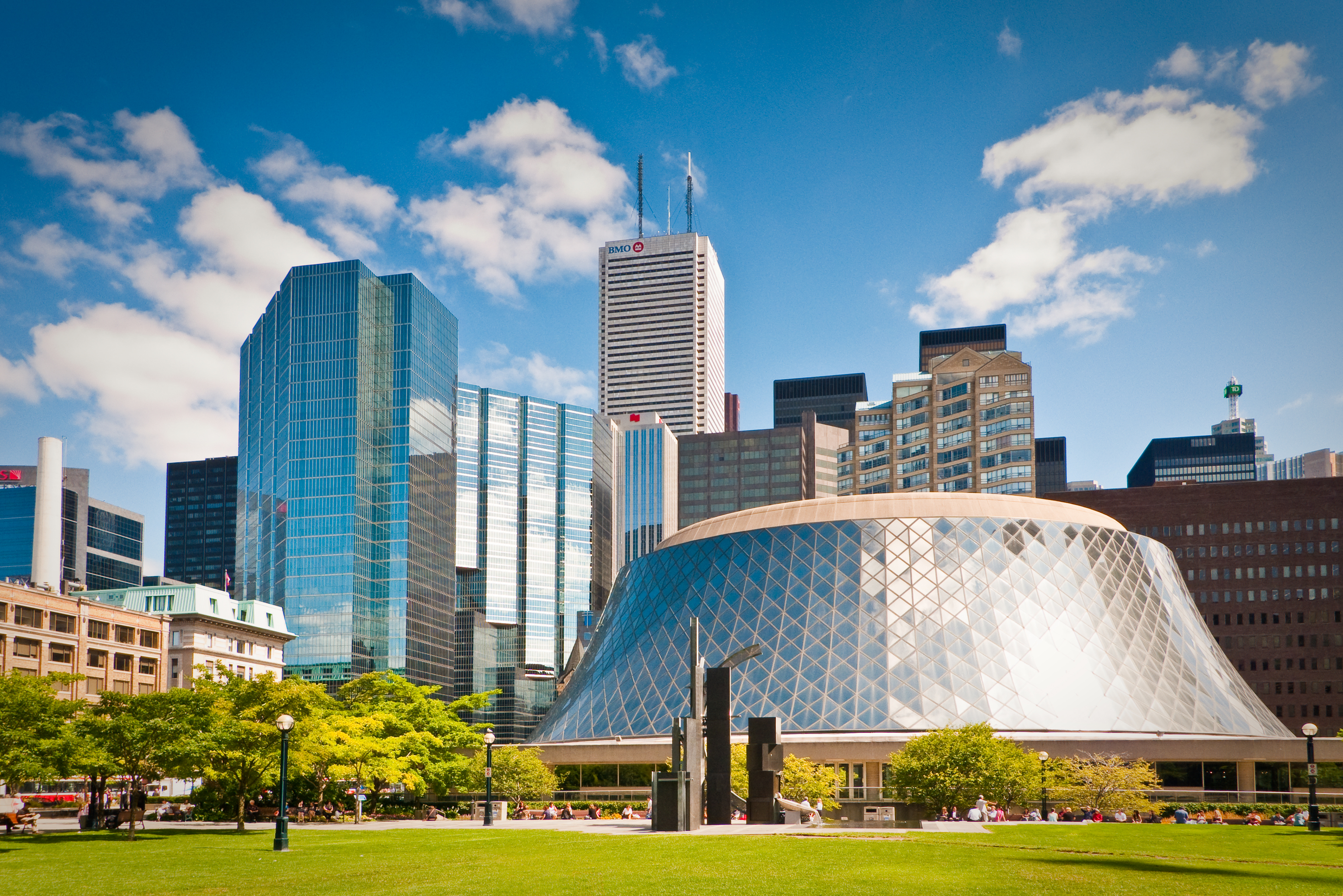
Roy Thomson Hall is a concert hall that acts as the home for the Toronto Symphony Orchestra. It is also used as one of the main venues for the Toronto International Film Festival.

Toronto is home to three professional orchestras, including the Toronto Symphony Orchestra, Esprit Orchestra, and Tafelmusik Baroque Orchestra & Chamber Choir, in addition to several small chamber ensembles specializing in Baroque, Classical, Romantic, Modern and World music. As is common in many cities in North America, choral ensembles that perform with professional instrumental ensembles are amateur. The largest of these is the Toronto Mendelssohn Choir, which performs large works for choir and orchestra. The professional core of this choir is the Elmer Iseler Singers. The Amadeus Choir is also a high-caliber ensemble. Canada's largest professional opera company, the Canadian Opera Company makes its home in the Four Seasons Centre for the Performing Arts, the first true opera house in Toronto and in Canada. There are a number of smaller professional opera ensembles, some of which specialize in new music, such as Tapestry New Opera. Other professional ensembles based in Toronto include the Hannaford Street Silver Band and Canadian Sinfonietta.

Three-piece rock band Rush has been active in Toronto since 1968; band members Geddy Lee and Alex Lifeson grew up in the city. An instrumental named "YYZ" after the Toronto Pearson International Airport's IATA airport code was featured on the band's 1981 album Moving Pictures, and has been a mainstay of their subsequent live shows. Dance-punk duo Death from Above 1979 began in Toronto and recorded one studio album (You're a Woman, I'm a Machine) before breaking up in 2006.

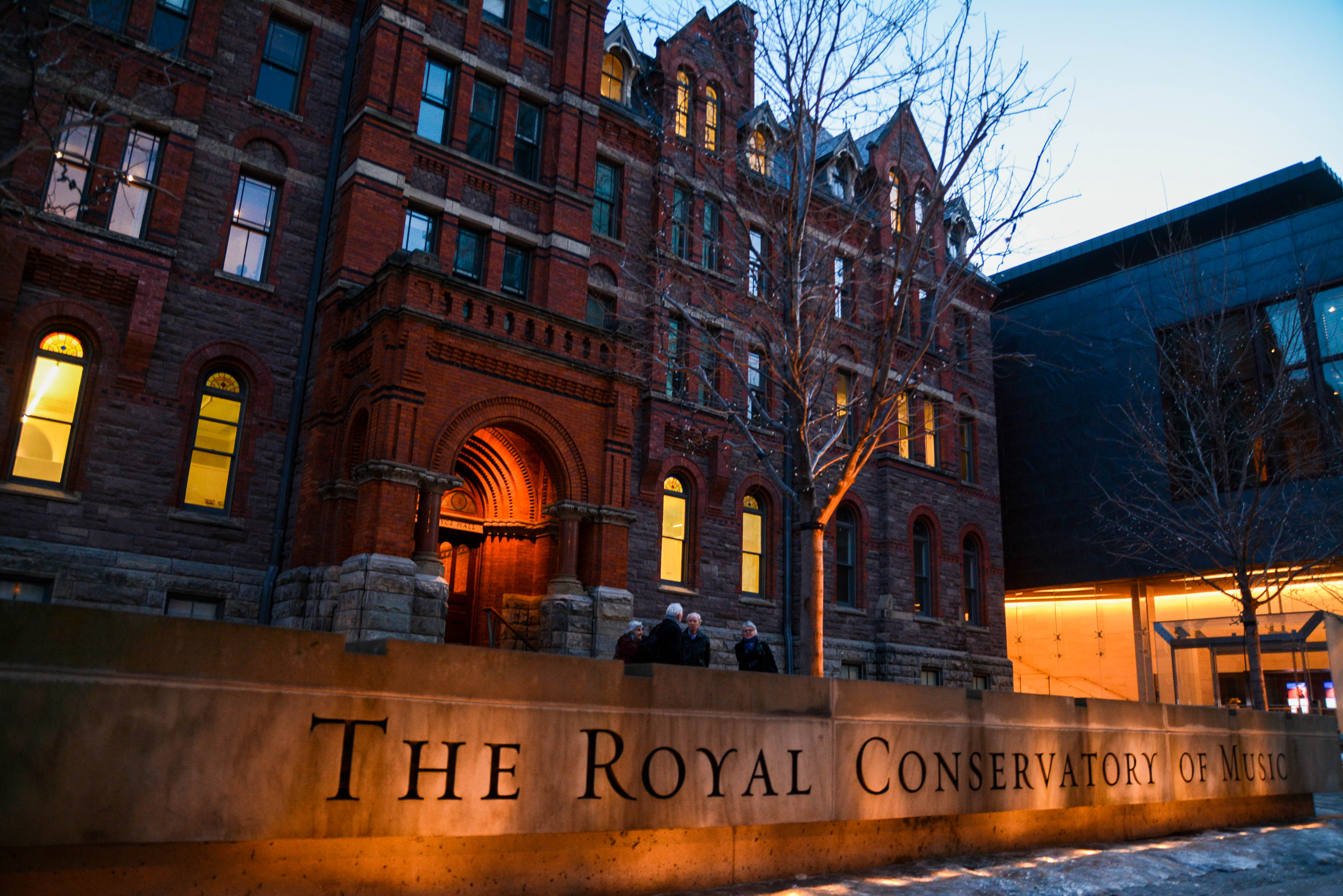
Founded in 1886, The Royal Conservatory of Music is a prominent organization in music education.

In 1971 the Canadian Electronic Ensemble was formed in Toronto. It is the oldest continuously active live-electronic performing group in the world. In the mid-1970s, the Southcote pop band from Toronto was active. During the late 1980s through the 1990s, Toronto was home to one of the largest Drum and Bass (Jungle) scenes in the world. After recently coming out of a recession, the many abandoned warehouses in the city became a breeding ground for Toronto's emerging rave scene. Parties, often only accessible by phoning into local hotlines or getting hold of flyers, were occurring all over the industrial areas of the city. The grassroots Jungle scene then grew from borderline illegal warehouse parties to dominating the clubs across the city. Soon, Drum and Bass in Toronto was big business. International acts flocked to play in the city and promoters threw bigger and bigger events. However, two student deaths connected to the rave-scene in 1999 prompted the city to take action. Provincial legislation, in the form of Bill 73 (the Raves Act of 2000), forced parties to apply for permits and made police presence standard at all events. This made hosting the rave parties the scene had become accustomed to unsustainable. Events quickly moved into clubs and more established locations to escape the strict regulation, but this had the unintended effect of removing people under the age of 19 from the scene. Over time, fewer youths engaging with the scene caused its gradual decline. Fewer events began to be hosted and Toronto eventually lost its intentional reputation for its Jungle scene.

Despite a hip-hop music scene active since the 1980s, Toronto's hip-hop artists are usually considered underground, having had little success outside of Canada until much recently. Artists who have achieved moderate mainstream success include Kardinal Offishall, k-os, Choclair, Maestro Fresh-Wes, Saukrates, Dream Warriors, K'naan and Drake. The post-2010 era has seen a stark change in the hip-hop landscape of Toronto, mostly attributed to the success of Drake in the late 2000s to early 2010s. The city is quickly becoming a larger player in hip-hop with artists such as Jazz Cartier, PARTYNEXTDOOR, Tory Lanez, P Reign, Roy Woods, NAV, OB O'Brian, Pressa, and Sean Leon among others, finding success. Many of the newer artists coming out of Toronto are signed to Drake's own label OVO Sound.

Starting in 1997, the music booker Daniel Burke has been credited with playing a "significant" role in revitalizing the music scene on College Street by booking a number of rising American and Canadian "indie" bands to play at various nightclubs. Burke's success as one of Toronto's top bookers despite issues with substance abuse and living as a homeless person have made him into a local celebrity.

R&B and soul music have been prominent in Toronto since the 1990s. Artists such as Deborah Cox, Glenn Lewis, Melanie Fiona, Daniel Caesar and The Weeknd have achieved mainstream success outside of Canada.

Toronto's goth scene emerged from the punk and new romantic alternative music scene in the early 1980s. Originally called "freaks", the subculture became significant in Toronto's night club and fashion culture in the late 1990s. After the Columbine High School massacre in Colorado, the goth scene experienced an understandable decline. The goth-industrial scene is largely situated in the neighbourhood of West Queen West, and a few signed and independent goth and industrial bands are based in Toronto.

== Sports ==
Regular sporting events, such as home games of the Toronto Maple Leafs, Toronto Blue Jays, Toronto Raptors, Toronto Tempo, Toronto Sceptres, Toronto FC, Toronto Marlies, Toronto Rock, and the Argonauts, bring tourists to the city every year, while the Honda Indy, held every July, attracts fans of auto racing. The city is also home to the King's Plate, one of the oldest continuously-run horse races in North America.

Hockey stirs much passion and interest, giving Toronto the sobriquet "Hockey capital". Basketball is also increasing in popularity, especially among the city's youth. In recent years, the Greater Toronto Area has become recognized as a global hub for basketball talent, with many players in the NBA hailing from the area. A championship by a major pro sports team is often marked by celebrations including a parade for the victorious team. Meanwhile, the Toronto Argonauts are one of the oldest operating professional sports franchises in North America, being active since 1873. Canadian football also originated in the area.

Toronto nurtures sports rivalries with other Great Lakes cities such as Hamilton (begun in 1873) as well as an intense historical rivalry with Montreal; the cities were two of the Original Six teams to contest the Stanley Cup. There is also a growing rivalry with the Ottawa Senators (dubbed the "Battle of Ontario") and the Buffalo Sabres.

=== Professional franchises ===
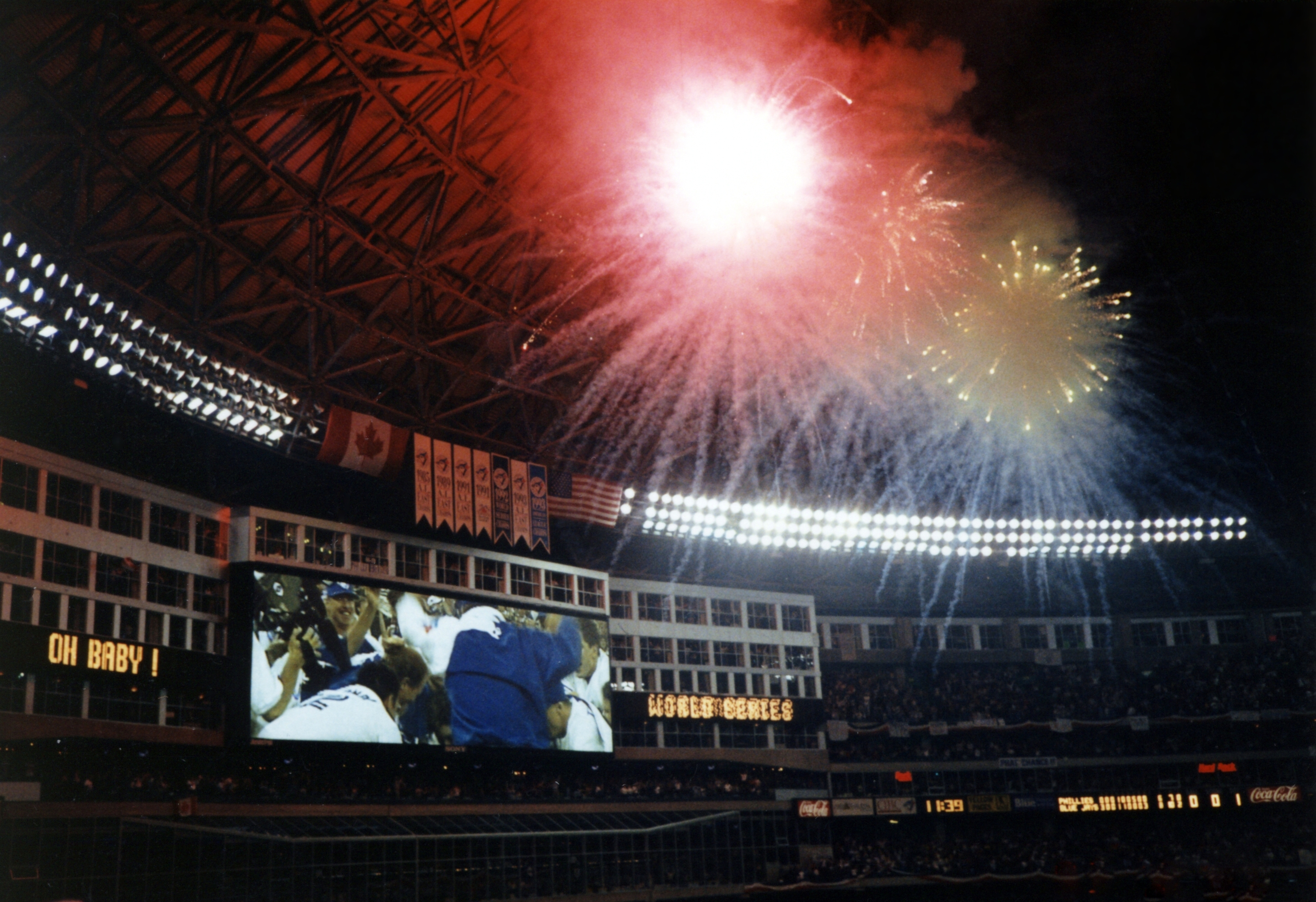
Celebrations at the SkyDome after the Toronto Blue Jays won the 1993 World Series. The Blue Jays are a professional baseball team of Major League Baseball, based in Toronto.

Club	League	Venue	Established	Championships
Toronto Argonauts	CFL	BMO Field	1873	17
Toronto Maple Leafs	NHL	Scotiabank Arena	1917	13
Toronto Blue Jays	MLB	Rogers Centre	1977	2
Toronto Raptors	NBA	Scotiabank Arena	1995	1
Toronto Rock	NLL	Scotiabank Arena	1999	6
Toronto Marlies	AHL	Coca-Cola Coliseum	2005	1
Toronto FC	Major League Soccer	BMO Field	2006	1
Toronto Wolfpack	RFL Championship	Lamport Stadium	2016	1
AFC Toronto	NSL	York Lions Stadium	2023	0
Toronto Sceptres	PWHL	Coca-Cola Coliseum	2024	0
Toronto Tempo	WNBA	Coca-Cola Coliseum	2026	0

=== Semi-professional franchises ===
Club	League	Venue	Established	Championships
Toronto Maple Leafs	Intercounty Baseball League	Christie Pits	1969	7
Toronto Eagles	Ontario Australian Football League	Humber College Park	1989	9
Toronto Downtown Dingos	Ontario Australian Football League	Humber College Park	1996	3
Toronto Rush	American Ultimate Disc League	Varsity Stadium	2013	1

=== Major sporting venues ===
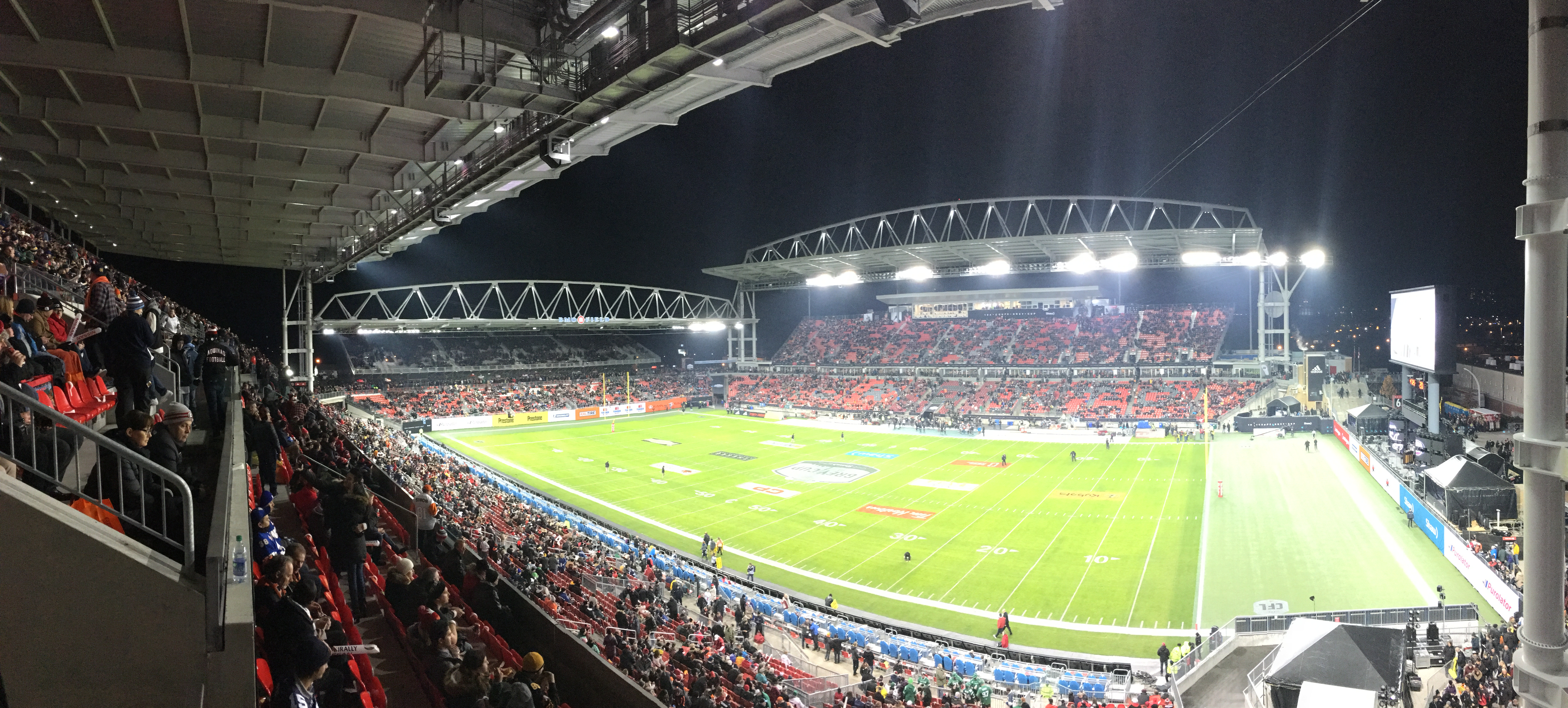
BMO Field is the home stadium for the Toronto FC of Major League Soccer, and the Toronto Argonauts of the Canadian Football League.

- Scotiabank Arena – home of the NHL Toronto Maple Leafs, the NBA Toronto Raptors and the NLL Toronto Rock.
- Allan Lamport Stadium – named after Toronto Mayor Allan Lamport, City-owned facility
- Beatrice Ice Gardens – York University
- Birchmount Stadium – City-owned facility
- BMO Field – home of the Toronto FC of the MLS, on the grounds of Exhibition Place and also home to the CFL Toronto Argonauts
- Christie Pits – home to the Toronto Maple Leafs (semi-pro baseball), City-owned facility
- Rexall Centre – home to National Tennis Centre at York University
- Ricoh Coliseum – home of the AHL Marlies. On City land.
- Rogers Centre – Owned and used by MLB Toronto Blue Jays
- Toronto Track and Field Centre at York University
- Varsity Arena – University of Toronto Varsity Blues Hockey
- Woodbine Race Track – owned by the Ontario Lottery and Gaming Corporation, site of the annual Breeders Cup for thoroughbreds
- Varsity Stadium - home of the Toronto Rush (disc ultimate)
