= Grant McCracken =

Canadian anthropologist and author (born 1951)

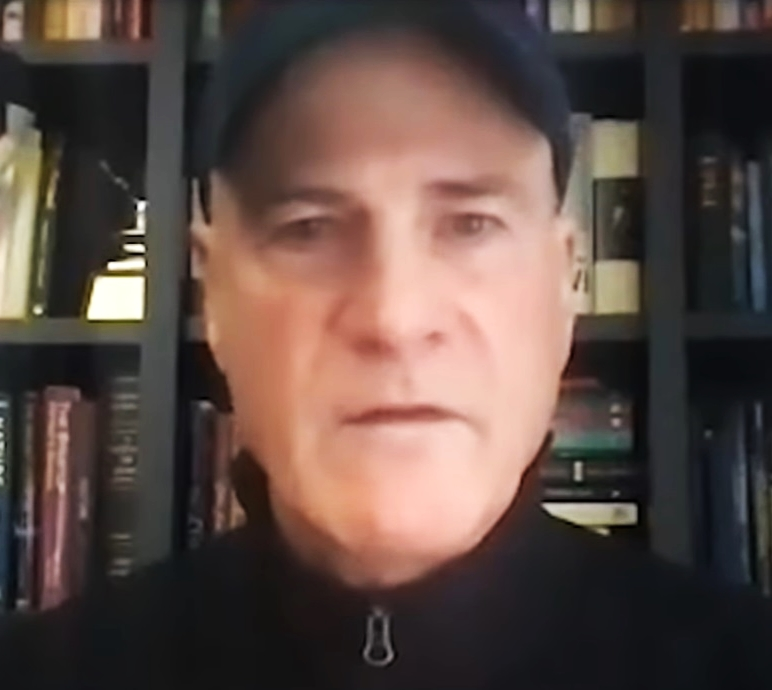
- McCracken speaks on Reason TV in 2021
- Born: Canada
- Occupation: Author lecturer
- Writing career
- Genres: Culture, commerce, business
- Notable works: Chief Culture Officer, Transformations
- Website: cultureby.com

Grant David McCracken (born 1951) is a Canadian anthropologist and author, known for his books about culture and commerce. He was the founder and director of the Institute for Contemporary Culture at the Royal Ontario Museum and was a member of Convergence Culture Consortium at MIT. He holds a Ph.D. in anthropology from the University of Chicago. He coined the term the Diderot effect. He lives in Rowayton, Connecticut.

== Bibliography ==
- 1988 The Long Interview
- 1990 Culture and Consumption
- 1996 Big Hair
- 1997 Plenitude
- 2005 Culture and Consumption II
- 2006 Flock and Flow
- 2008 Transformations
- 2009 Chief Culture Officer
- 2012 Culturematic
- 2016 Dark Value
- 2020 The New Honor Code
- 2022 Return of the Artisan

== See also ==
- Diderot effect
