= Smile Records =

Smile Records can refer to:

- Smile Records (Canada)
- Smile Records (US)

== See also ==
- Painted Smiles Records
- Smile (The Beach Boys album)
