= Cuisine of Toronto =

Culinary traditions in a Canadian city

The cuisine of Toronto reflects Toronto's size and multicultural diversity. Ethnic neighbourhoods throughout the city focus on specific cuisines, such as authentic Chinese and Vietnamese found in the city's Chinatowns, Korean in Koreatown, Greek on The Danforth, Italian cuisine in Little Italy and Corso Italia, Bangladeshi cuisine in southwest Scarborough and East York, and Indian/Pakistani in Little India. Other world cuisines available in the city include Portuguese, Hungarian, Japanese, and Caribbean. Toronto's large Jewish population has given rise to many Jewish restaurants and delis, with varying adherence to kosher rules.

== Neighbourhoods with prominent ethnic food ==
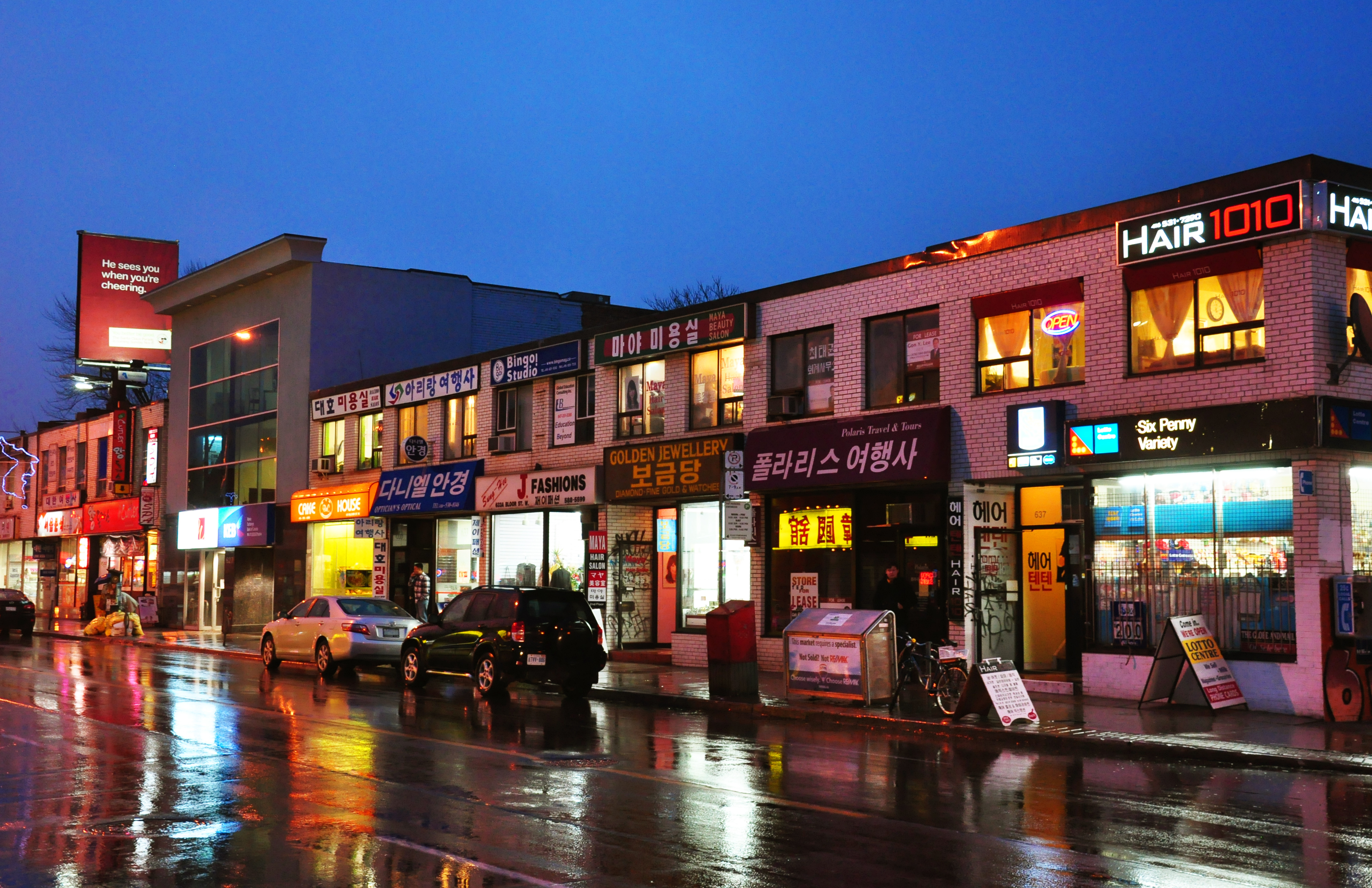
Toronto's Koreatown is home to a number of Korean restaurants.

- Eglinton West – Caribbean food
- Roncesvalles – Polish cuisine
- Chinatown and East Chinatown– Chinese and Vietnamese food
- Kensington Market – Latin American, Vietnamese, Japanese, Turkish, Mexican, Caribbean, and others
- Little Italy and Corso Italia – Italian
- Gerrard India Bazaar and Rexdale – Indian and Pakistani
- Agincourt – Chinese, Korean, Japanese, Vietnamese, South Indian, Sri Lankan
- Clanton Park and Lawrence Manor – Jewish, Filipino
- Wexford - Japanese, Vietnamese, South Indian, Afghani, Sri Lankan, Iraqi, Lebanese, Pakistani, Egyptian, Filipino, Syrian, East African
- Koreatown – Korean
- Little Portugal/Rua Acores – Portuguese
- The Danforth – Greek, Turkish
- The Annex – Hungarian (historically)
- North York City Centre, Newtonbrook - Korean, Chinese, Iranian
- St. Clair West – Latin American (between Oakwood and Old Weston)

== Chefs ==
Notable chefs from or based in Toronto:

- Susur Lee
- Massimo Capra
- Jamie Kennedy
- Brad Long
- Pasquale Carpino
- Christine Cushing
- David Adjey
- Mark McEwan
- Lynn Crawford
- Marc Thuet
- David Rocco
- Guy Rubino
- Claudio Aprile
- Michael Bonacini
- Matty Matheson
- Sash Simpson

=== Food-related personalities ===
- Kevin Brauch
- Charles Khabouth

== Breweries ==
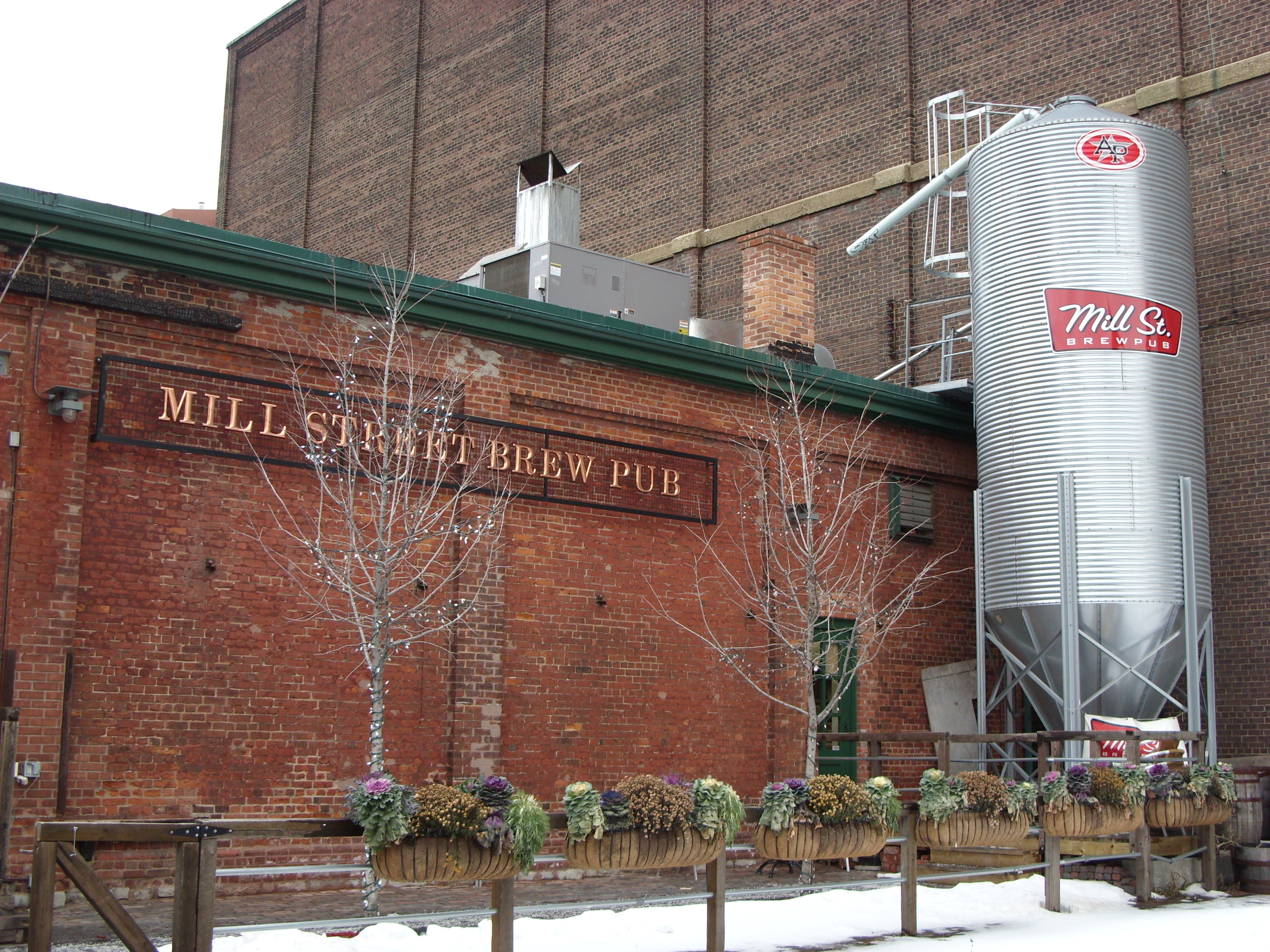
The back of Mill Street Brewery Brew Pub in Toronto's Distillery District

Toronto has a long history of beer brewing. Eugene O'Keefe, founder of O'Keefe Brewing Company, grew up in Toronto, to which his family had emigrated from Ireland in 1832. O'Keefe was the first to produce lager beer in Canada along with the traditional ale and porter.

Notable breweries in the city include Amsterdam Brewing Company, Mill Street Brewery, and Steam Whistle Brewing.

== See also ==
- Canadian Chinese cuisine
- Canadian cuisine
- Culture in Toronto: Food
