= Sushi pizza =

Japanese-inspired dish invented in Toronto

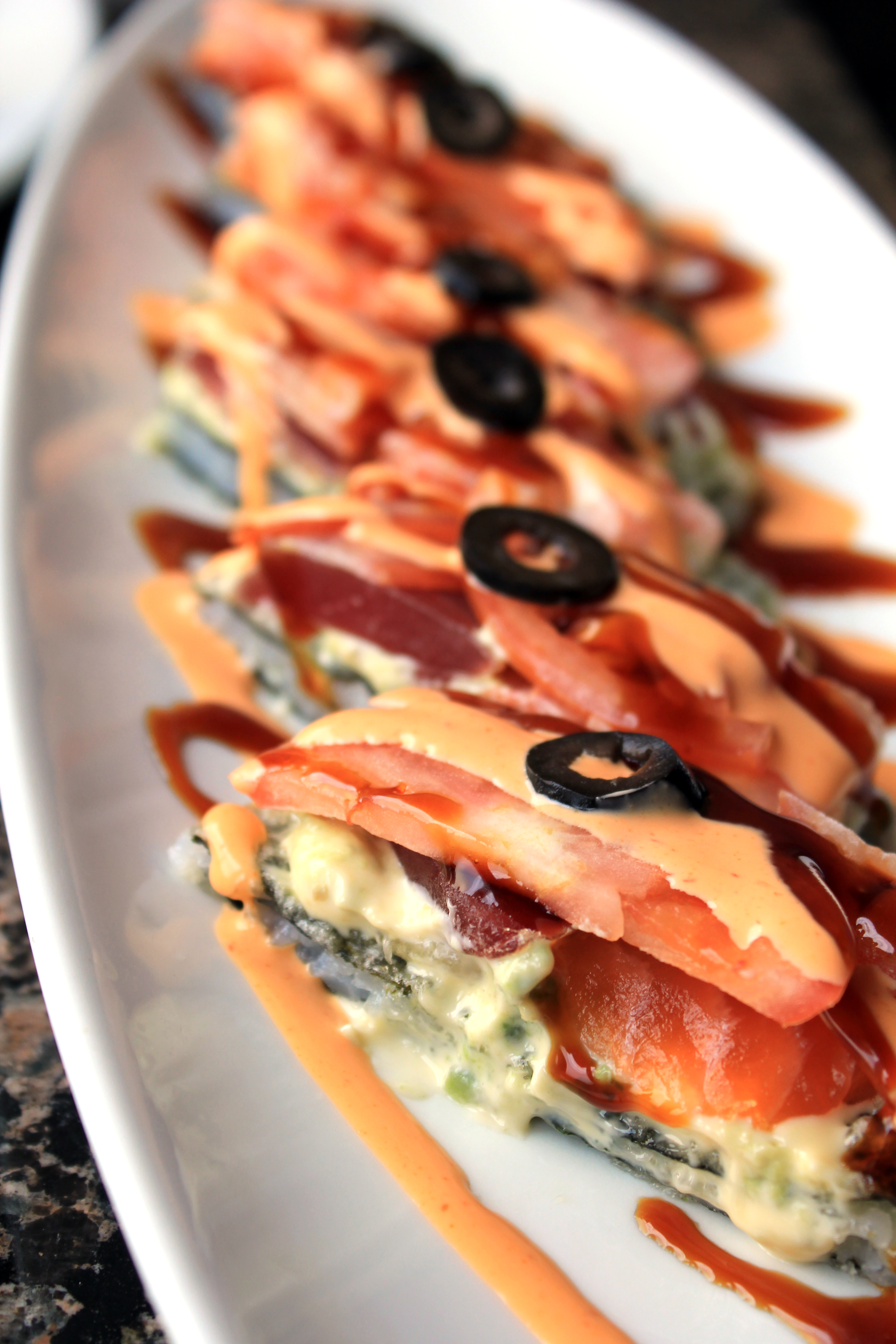
- Sushi pizza
- Course: Main course
- Place of origin: Canada
- Region or state: Toronto
- Serving temperature: Hot
- Main ingredients: Fried rice patty, salmon, avocado
- Variations: Multiple
- Food energy (per serving): 312 per serving (151g)

Sushi pizza is a Canadian dish that originated from Toronto and a fusion of sushi and pizza often served in the Greater Toronto Area, conceptualized by Kaoru Ohsada no later than May 1993 as a Nami Japanese Seafood Restaurant chef. It uses a slightly crispy yet chewy fried rice patty as the base and is topped with a layer of sliced avocado, a layer of sliced salmon, tuna or crab meat, a drizzle of blended mayonnaise and wasabi powder and is served in wedges. Nori, pickled ginger, and roe are sometimes also served as toppings or on the side.

Due to the popularity and wide availability of the dish in Toronto, it has quickly become one of the city's signature dishes, along with the peameal bacon sandwich.

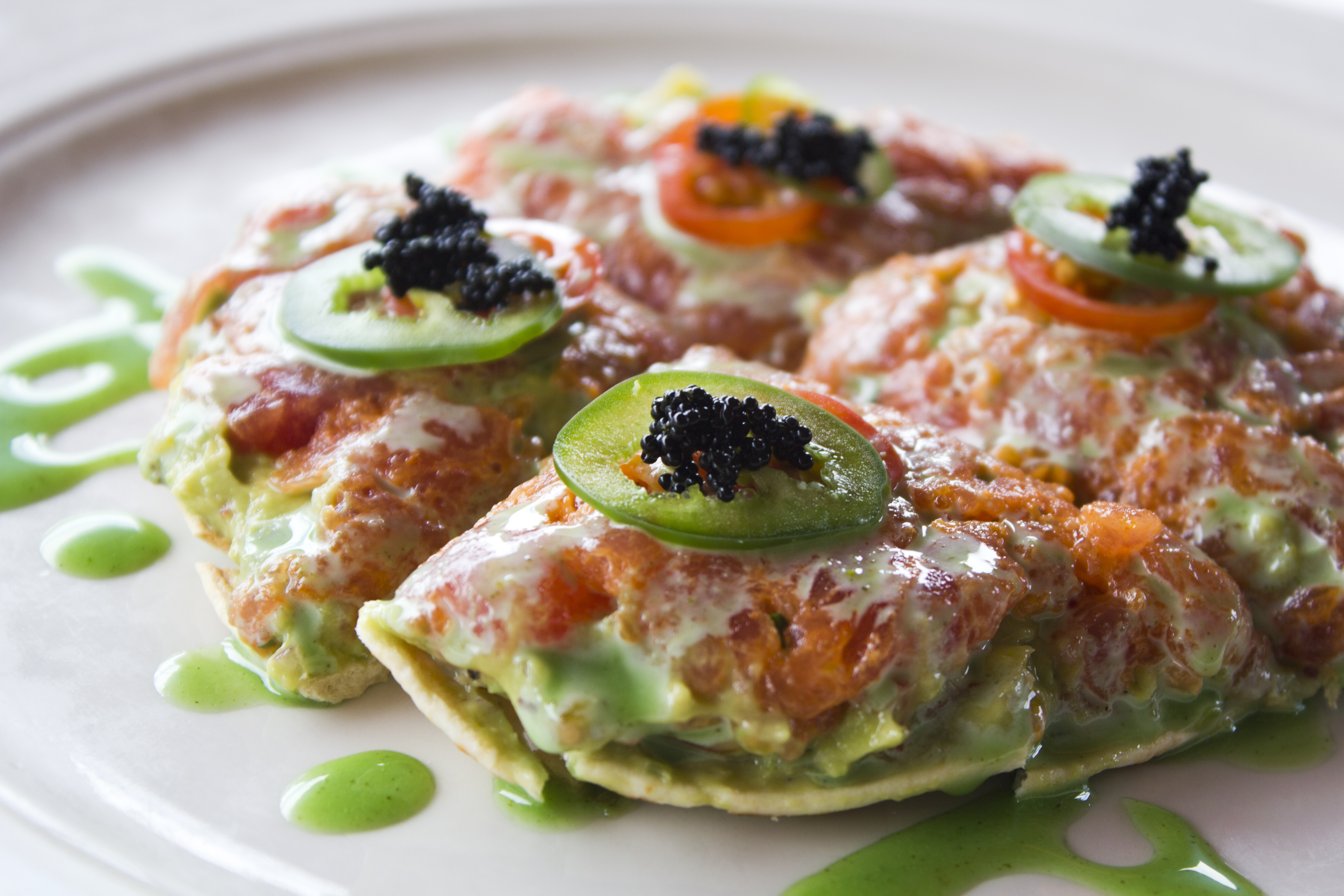
Sushi pizza

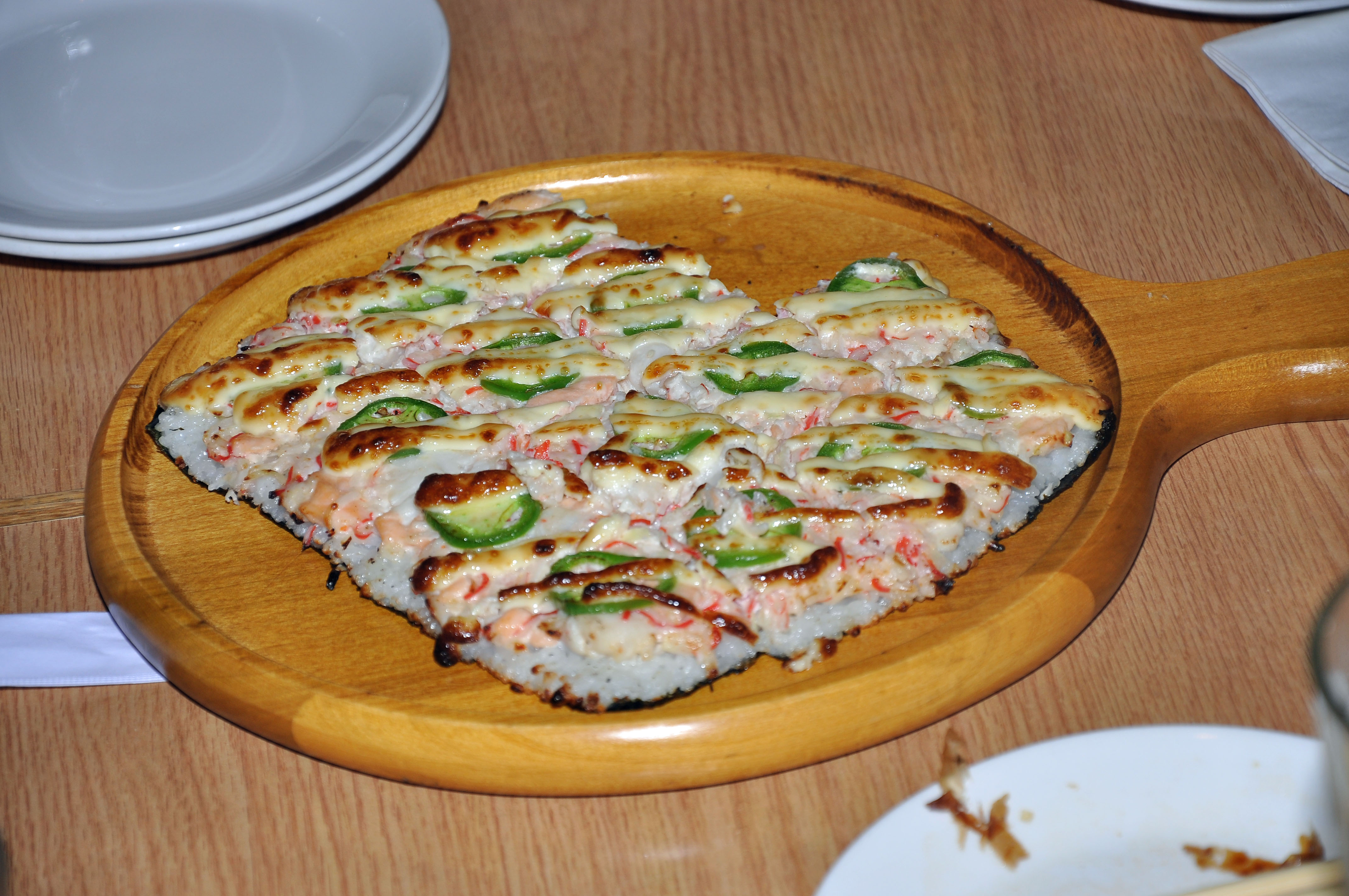
A different kind of "sushi pizza" from a restaurant in Hawaii

== See also ==
- Canadian cuisine
- Cuisine of Toronto
- Sushi burrito
- Fusion cuisine
