= Southcote (band) =

- Origin: Toronto, Ontario, Canada
- Genres: Pop
- Years active: 1970s
- Labels: Smile
- Past members: Beau David; Breen LeBoeuf; Charlie White; Lance Wright; Joe Ress

Southcote was a Canadian pop band from Toronto active in the mid-1970s. Forming in 1972, they signed to Smile Records. They released the single "She" in 1973, which was a hit in Canada and reached #19 on the RPM Top Singles chart. It was released in the U.S. by Buddah Records and also reached #80 on the Billboard Hot 100 in the United States.

== Members ==
- Beau David (vocals)
- Breen LeBoeuf (vocals, keyboards, bass)
- Charlie White (guitar)
- Lance Wright (drums)
- Joe Ress (keyboards, added in 1973)
