= Sushirrito =

Fast food chain

Restaurant information
- Food type: Sushi burrito
- Location: United States
- Other locations: San Francisco Bay Area, California

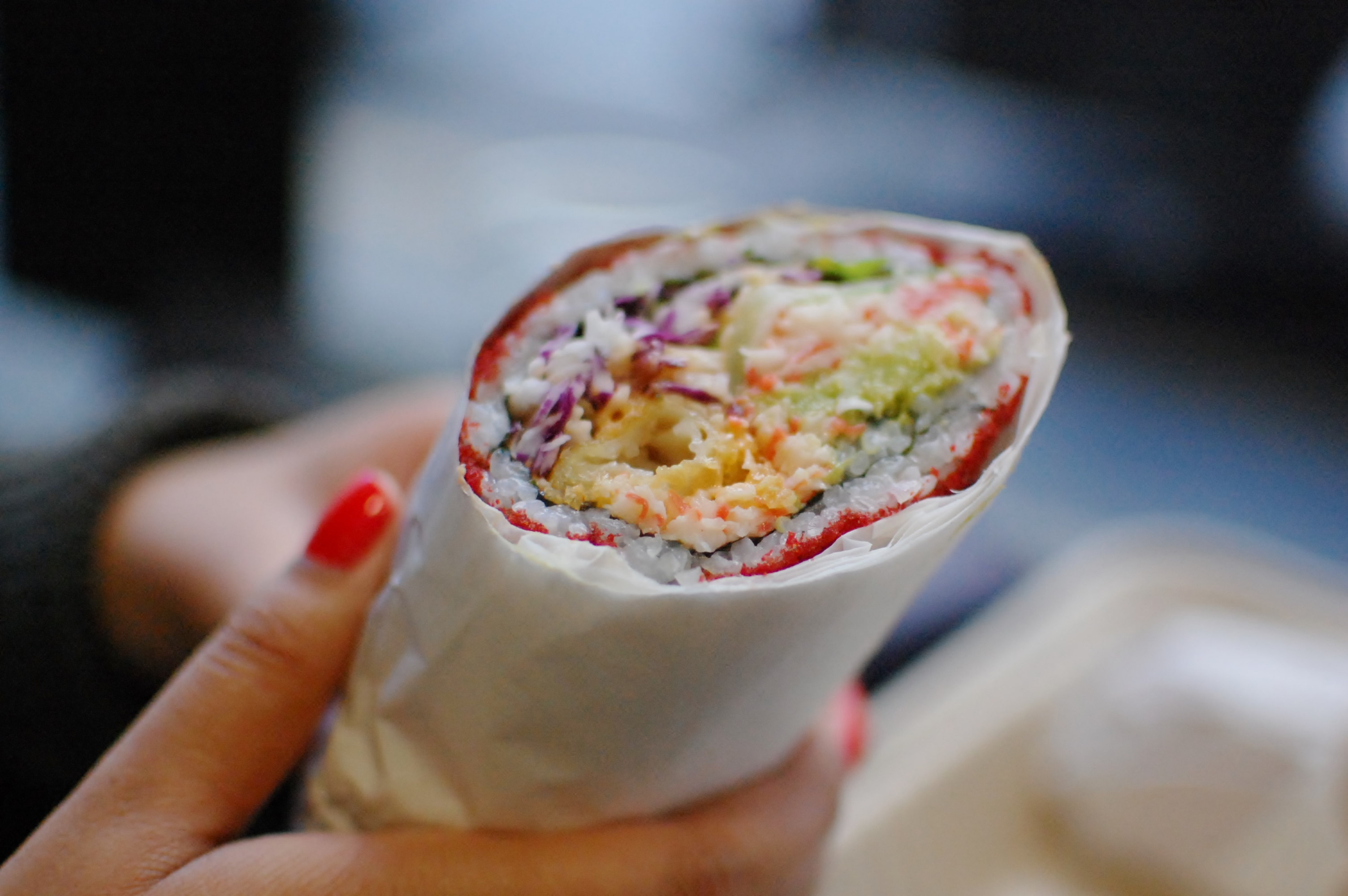
A sushi burrito

Sushirrito is a fast casual restaurant chain that started in San Francisco in January 2011. The main distinction is the titular "sushirrito", a blend of traditional sushi with the form of a burrito, with the intent of portability. As of October 2024, it has 9 locations in the San Francisco Bay Area.

== Food ==
Sushirrito does not offer customizability in its food. Soy sauce and wasabi are also not offered.

In the San Francisco Bay area, Sushirrito receives its fish from Royal Hawaiian Seafood, which sources its fish based on the Monterey Bay Aquarium’s Seafood Watch's sustainability criteria and research.

== See also ==
- Sushi burrito
