= Diderot effect =

Social phenomenon

The Diderot effect is a phenomenon that occurs when acquiring a new possession leads to a spiral of consumption that results in the acquisition of even more possessions. In other words, buying something new can cause a chain reaction leading to one buying more and more things. Each new item makes one feel like one needs other things to go with it or to keep up with it. This can lead to overspending and accumulating more possessions than one needs or uses.

The term was coined by anthropologist and scholar of consumption patterns Grant McCracken in 1986, and is named after the French philosopher Denis Diderot (1713–1784), who first described the effect in an essay titled "Regrets for my Old Dressing Gown, or, A warning to those who have more taste than fortune".

The term has been used in discussions of sustainable consumption and green consumerism, in regard to the process whereby a purchase or gift creates dissatisfaction with existing possessions and environment, provoking a potentially spiraling pattern of consumption with negative environmental, psychological, and social impacts.

== Origin ==
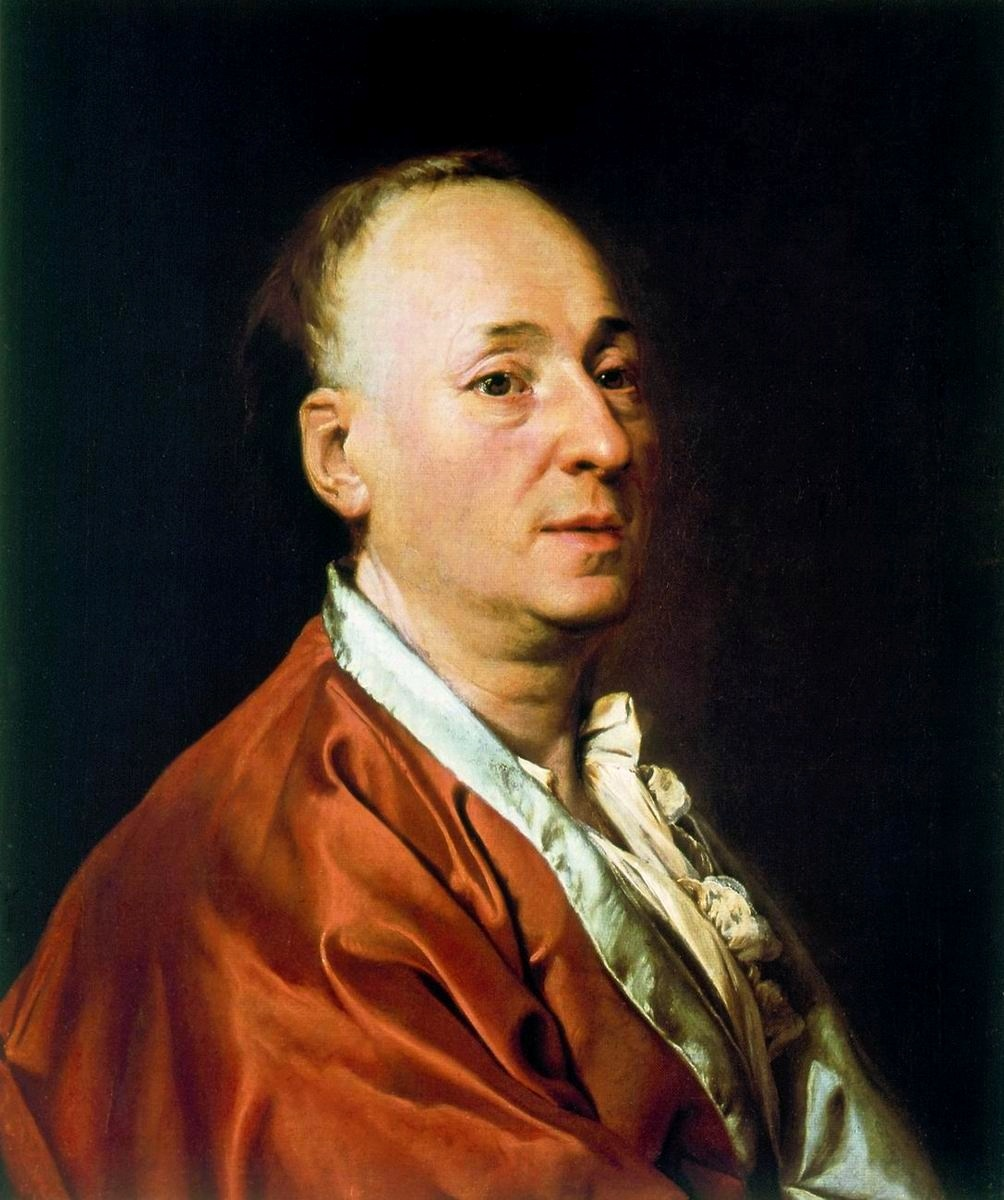
Denis Diderot in red gown, by Dmitry Levitzky, 1773. In his 1769 essay "Regrets for my Old Dressing Gown", Diderot describes how receiving a new gown affected his view of his other possessions.

The effect was first described in Diderot's essay of 1769 "Regrets for my Old Dressing Gown". In this essay Diderot tells how the gift of a beautiful scarlet dressing gown leads to unexpected results, eventually plunging him into debt. Initially pleased with the gift, Diderot came to rue his new garment. Compared to his elegant new dressing gown, the rest of his possessions began to seem tawdry and he became dissatisfied that they did not live up to the elegance and style of his new possession. He replaced his old straw chair, for example, with an armchair covered in Moroccan leather; his old desk was replaced with an expensive new writing table; his formerly beloved prints were replaced with more costly prints, and so on.

"I was absolute master of my old dressing gown", Diderot writes, "but I have become a slave to my new one ... Beware of the contamination of sudden wealth. The poor man may take his ease without thinking of appearances, but the rich man is always under a strain".

== Usage ==
In anthropologist Grant McCracken's usage in 1986, the Diderot effect is the result of the interaction between objects within "product complements", or "Diderot unities", and consumers. A Diderot unity is a group of objects that are considered to be culturally complementary, to one another. McCracken suggests that a consumer is less likely to veer from a preferred Diderot unity to strive towards unity in appearance and representation of one's social role. However, it can also mean that if an object that is somehow deviant from the preferred Diderot unity is acquired, it may have the effect of causing the consumer to start subscribing to a completely different Diderot unity.

Sociologist and economist Juliet Schor uses the term in her 1992 book The Overspent American: Why We Want What We Don't Need to describe processes of competitive, status-conscious consumption driven by dissatisfaction. Schor's 2005 essay "Learning Diderot's Lesson: Stopping the Upward Creep of Desire" describes the effect in contemporary consumer culture in the context of its negative environmental consequences.

James Clear discusses the Diderot effect in his 2018 book Atomic Habits. After recounting Diderot's purchase of a scarlet robe and the subsequent replacement of other possessions, Clear uses the episode to illustrate how one action can become a cue for the next. He then applies the same principle to habit stacking, a technique in which a new habit is attached to an existing daily routine.

== See also ==
- Hedonic treadmill
- Induced demand
- Keeping up with the Joneses
- Lifestyle creep
