= Sushi burrito =

Type of Japanese-Mexican fusion cuisine

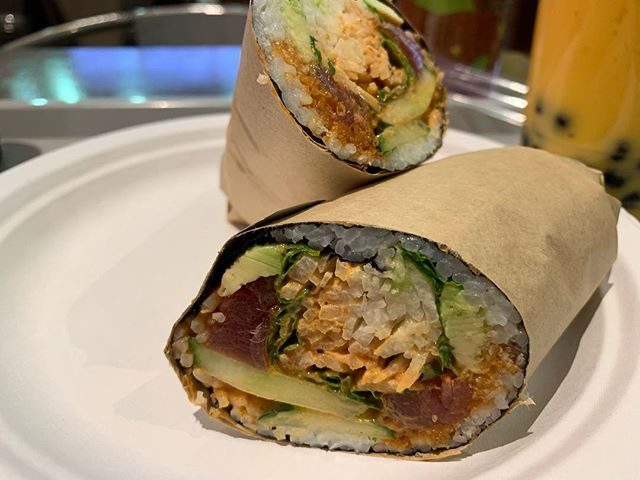
- Type: Sushi
- Place of origin: United States
- Associated cuisine: Japan, Mexico, United States
- Created by: Peter Yen
- Main ingredients: Wrap, fish, rice
- Ingredients generally used: Fish, sliced meat, nori, sliced vegetables, sauces

The sushi burrito or sushirrito is a type of Japanese-Mexican fusion cuisine. It is typically prepared by rolling sushi ingredients such as fish and vegetables in a wrap and serving like a burrito. The dish is a form of American fusion cuisine inspired by the mixture of Mexican and Japanese cuisine, but is not considered to be authentic to either.

== Variations ==
Some variations of the sushi burrito include Mexican American ingredients typical of burritos, while others are simply burrito-sized rolls with traditional ingredients. The latter dish was described by GQ as an "oversized maki roll." Sushi burrito recipes often include raw or fried fish, as well as seaweed or rice wrappers in place of traditional tortillas used in burritos. Soy paper is also commonly used as a wrap.

== History ==
The sushi burrito was created in 2008 by Peter Yen of the San Francisco fast casual restaurant Sushirrito. Since then, the dish has expanded in popularity and is sold by a variety of sushi and burrito restaurants in the United States.

== Reception ==
Sushi burritos have seen widespread popularity in the United States since their creation. Their popularity is partly based on the popularity of both sushi and burritos as take-out and casual dining meals, as well as the influence of "foodie" culture. Josh Scherer of the LA Weekly described the popularity of the sushi burrito as a food trend, and criticized both the eating experience and authenticity of the dish.

== See also ==
- Sinaloan sushi
- Sushi pizza
