= Jamie Kennedy (chef) =

Canadian chef

Jamie Kennedy OC
- Born: Henry James Kennedy; 1960 (age 65–66); Don Mills, Ontario
- Culinary career
- Previous restaurants
- Jamie Kennedy at the ROM, Jamie Kennedy Wine Bar; Jamie Kennedy at the Gardiner; Gilead Café; Bistro 67; Windows by Jamie Kennedy
- Website: https://jamiekennedy.ca/

Jamie Kennedy (born Henry James Kennedy) is a Canadian chef.

Kennedy is the proprietor of Jamie Kennedy Kitchens based in Toronto, Ontario. He was previously the owner and operator of Gilead Café from 2008 to the cafe's closure in March 2015. Kennedy's cafe was notable for its Wine Bar menu of small tapas-like dishes and dessert items, suitable for sharing and sampling, and a seating area where diners could observe and talk to the chef and sous chefs preparing plates for guests.

In 2005, Kennedy opened a restaurant adjacent to the Wine Bar which served a more complete seasonal menu of various Canadian and international fares. The restaurant has since closed and in October 2008, was replaced by a cafe.

In 2006, Kennedy opened another restaurant, Jamie Kennedy Gardiner, at the Gardiner Museum of Ceramic Art which has undergone a complete renovation.

Coupled with his restaurant business is a catering service and event space that can be rented.

Kennedy used to possess an operation at the Royal Ontario Museum, Jamie Kennedy at the ROM, which operated on the third floor of the museum and its member lounge, but has since closed due to the museum's own extensive renovations and restoration.

Kennedy was the inaugural recipient of the Governor General's Award in Celebration of the Nation's Table, in 2010. In December 2010, was awarded the Order of Canada for his promotion of Canadian cuisine and the use of organic, sustainable and locally sourced foods.

In 2015 Kennedy produced a cookbook, J.K. The Jamie Kennedy Cookbook.

== See also ==
- Cuisine of Toronto
