= Sinaloan sushi =

Mexican-American and Japanese fusion cuisine

Sinaloan sushi is a type of Mexican-American and Japanese fusion cuisine found prominently on the northern side of Mexico, mainly in Sinaloa state where it originated. In the US it is usually found on the United States West Coast and Southwest. Instead of wasabi, heat is provided by Sinaloa spices such as chipotle, chiltepin and jalapeño.

The food probably originated in Culiacán, Sinaloa in the early 2000s, then was adopted in Los Angeles in the 2010s. Some of the first American restaurants were in Los Angeles County in 2013, and the first Mexican sushi restaurant in Orange County opened in 2015. In 2016, at least six Mexican sushi restaurants were open in the Phoenix, Arizona area. In 2017, one opened in Houston, Texas, and another in the Denver area. In 2017, one opened in Kent, Washington, and in 2021, one opened in Tacoma, Washington. It reached the Canadian city of Toronto by 2022.

== See also ==
- Sushi burrito
