= Sash Simpson =

Chef and Toronto restaurant owner

Sash Simpson (born 1970) is a chef and owner of the Toronto restaurant Sash. He was a street kid in southern India before being adopted by Sandra Simpson of the Toronto charity Families for Children.

== Biography ==
=== Early life ===
A runaway as a child, Simpson lived in a movie theatre before being taken in by an orphanage in Coimbatore sponsored by a Canadian nonprofit, Families for Children, when he was seven.

In 1979 Simpson was adopted by Sandra Simpson, the founder of Families for Children, the group that sponsored the orphanage. He moved to Toronto with Ms. Simpson, where he lived with the Simpsons' four biological and 28 other adopted children.

Sash dropped out of high school in the 12th grade to work full-time in the restaurant industry.

=== Culinary career ===
Sash Simpson started his first job of delivering newspapers when he was 12. He worked as a dishwasher when he was 14. He helped in the Toronto restaurant run by Ms Simpson called Mel’s Montreal Delicatessen.

In 1993, Simpson joined the restaurant North 44 in the northern section of Toronto. He initially joined the restaurant as an unpaid stage, before working his way up in the kitchen. He left North 44 briefly in 2002 to help open Bymark, another restaurant by North 44 owner Mark McEwan, as executive sous chef. However, he returned to North 44 soon after and, in 2003, became the executive chef of the restaurant.

Simpson worked at North 44 until the restaurant closed in 2018.

Simpson opened his own restaurant Sash Restaurant & Wine Bar in 2019.

Documentary filmmaker Barry Avrich produced a documentary about Sash's life, released in 2024. The film was shot in Toronto and India.

=== Personal life ===
Simpson met his wife Robin Pitcher in 2008. The couple married in 2011.

Simpson returned to India in 2018 to open a restaurant at his former orphanage, where orphans who reach the age of 18 can work and develop skills.
