= Institute for Contemporary Culture =

- Location of the Institute in Toronto
- Established: 1989
- Location: Royal Ontario Museum, Queen's Park, Toronto, Ontario, Canada
- Coordinates: 43.6677097°N 79.3947771°W
- Director: Francisco Alvarez (2008-2012)
- Public transit access: Toronto Transit Commission subway stations: Museum and St. George

The Institute for Contemporary Culture (ICC) is located in the Royal Ontario Museum (ROM) in Toronto, Ontario, Canada, and serves as the ROM’s window on contemporary society. While the ROM’s vast collection explores world cultures and natural history, the ICC focuses on contemporary works of art that connect living society with the cultural and natural artifacts of the ROM, including art installations, photography exhibits, and performance pieces. The ICC also coordinates the ROM’s involvement with major annual events in Toronto such as Nuit Blanche, Luminato, and the Toronto International Film Festival. The ICC has hosted many travelling exhibitions. The institute's annual highlight was. since 2006, the Eva Holtby Lecture on Contemporary Culture. It has not taken place since 2019.

As of 2025, it is unclear if the ICC is still active.

== History ==
Founded in 1989, the ICC was established to present the contemporary world to ROM audiences. After 2005, the ICC’s mandate became more focused. Rather than investigating everything and anything contemporary, with Canadian subjects being given preference, the focus became cultural and socio-political issues of international significance examined through works of art. Although its exhibitions and programs tend to take a global perspective, Canadian relevance and content continues to be of important consideration. The ICC's most recent show "Fresh Perspectives: Tours of El Anatsui: When I Last Wrote to You about Africa" was presented in 2011.

== Galleries ==
The ICC has hosted its major exhibitions in the Roloff Beny Gallery on Level 4 of the Michael Lee-Chin Crystal. This high-ceilinged multimedia gallery of approximately 6,000 sq ft (560 m^{2}) served as the Royal Ontario Museum's main contemporary art exhibition space. The gallery has featured ICC's exhibitions on fashion photography (2009), street art (2009), Chinese urban design and architecture (2008), and contemporary Japanese art (2007).
