= Canadian independent record labels =

The Canadian independent music scene has been active for some decades, with significant growth occurring in the mid-1970s. The industry is largely split along the language divide, for example SOPROQ is a collective that focuses mainly on the French-speaking domestic sector and some international artists, whereas the Canadian Independent Record Production Association (CIRPA) is an industry association composed of English speaking labels, producers and others. Dorland argues that (as of 1996) "the racial and ethnic boundaries" are growing stronger.

== History ==
=== 1970s ===
Around this time many independent record labels distributed through London Records including Maple Records, Smile Records, Attic Records, Boot Records, Kilmarnock Records, and French language labels including Socite Zoologique du Quebec. Goldfish Records moved from London to A&M.

In 1975 CIRPA was formed to represent the English-speaking independent music industry.

=== 1980s ===
X-records was an independent record label that recorded the Rheostatics first album and other bands like Pig Farm and Nomind.

Toronto, Ont Adam Faux, Corrinne Timmins, Rob (last name unknown)

Dove Entertainment (Toronto) - released Industrial and experimental bands/ music

=== 2000s ===
In 2006 the Independent Digital Licensing Agency (IDLA) was set up by CIPRA and twenty independents with funding form the Ontario government (Ontario Media Development Corporation).

== Artist owned labels ==
History music, independent record label based in Vancouver BC, started 2006 by black halos drummer Rob Z and Danny Cameo. Released Black Halos "we are not alone". Produced by Jack Endino, executive producer Danny Cameo. Mastered by Jack Endino.

== List of labels ==
Currently Active

- 473 SOUND INC.
- 473 SOUND (record label)
- 604 Records
- Aardskarf Records
- Ambiances Magnétiques
- Arbutus Records
- Ariella Records
- Arts & Crafts
- ALTR Inc
- Blue Fog Recordings
- Borealis Records
- Buzz Masters War
- Constellation Records
- Cargo Records
- Close to Modern
- City Natives Ent.
- City Natives Records
- Deadbeats
- Dare to Care Records
- Deep Therapy Records
- Dine Alone Records
- Distort Entertainment
- East Park Productions
- Faith Bow Media Ltd
- FAITH BOW MUSIC CO.
- Fileunder:music
- Flemish Eye
- FOF Records Inc.
- Funktasy Records
- Hype-R Music Group
- Justin Time Records
- Kannibalen Records
- Last Gang Records
- Leaf Music
- Light Organ Records
- Linus Entertainment
- FOF Records Inc.
- Minemine Records
- Mint Records
- Monstercat
- Nettwerk Productions
- Omerta Records
- Royalty Records
- Paper Bag Records
- Preeminent Music Group
- Secret City Records
- Six Shooter Records
- SiddiousMusic Corp.
- Sonic Unyon
- Stand One Records
- True North Records
- Tiger Music Productions Canada
- UNT Records
- Gladiator Records
- ViiiZUALEYES Media Group & Recordings Inc

Currently Defunct

- Blocks Recording Club
- Mammoth Cave Recording Co.
- History Music
- Orange Records
- Three Gut Records
- TheBrokenReckords Entertainment
- Broken Reckords Media Group

== See also ==
- Category:Canadian independent record labels
- Canadian Independent Record Production Association
