= List of Chopped Canada episodes =

This is the list of episodes for the Food Network Canada competition reality series Chopped Canada.

== Series overview ==
Season	Episodes	Originally released	
Season	Episodes	First released	Last released
1	26	January 2, 2014	June 26, 2014
2	26	January 10, 2015	July 4, 2015
3	24	November 28, 2015	October 15, 2016
4	15	October 16, 2016	February 11, 2017

== Episodes ==
=== Season 1 ===
Chopped Canada Season 1 episodes
No. in series	Title	Judges	Competitors (Bold indicates Winner)	Original air date
1	"The Proof is in the Pudding"	Michael Smith; Vikram Vij; Anne Yarymowich	Daniel Janetos; Johan Maes; **Shelley Robinson**; Patrick Vasiliauskas	January 2, 2014
2	"Disheveled Until Dessert"	Chuck Hughes; Roger Mooking; Anne Yarymowich	Matt Binkley; **Stephanie Brewster**; Jonathan O'Callaghan; Tim Schorno	January 9, 2014
3	"Food, Sweat, Tears"	Lynn Crawford; John Higgins; Roger Mooking	Mike Batke; Adam Calzonetti; **Ryan Reed**; Robin Wasicuna	January 16, 2014
4	"All's Fair in Cooking and War"	Chuck Hughes; Roger Mooking; Anne Yarymowich	Steve Glavicich; Diana Johnstone; Robert Rose; **Alvin Viguilla**	January 23, 2014
5	"Just Desserts"	Susur Lee; Vikram Vij; Anne Yarymowich	Bryan Birch; **Paul Lillakas**; Terrance Tew; Eric Wood	January 30, 2014
6	"The Trouble With Tuile"	John Higgins; Michael Smith; Anne Yarymowich	**Luca Cianciulli**; Mariel Montero Sena; Adam Ryan; Trevor Wilkinson	February 6, 2014
7	"Clams, Lamb, Thank You Ma'am"	Chuck Hughes; Susur Lee; Roger Mooking	Jesse Fader; Luke Hayes-Alexander; **Brianne Nash**; William Tse	February 13, 2014
8	"Ramp It Up"	John Higgins; Michael Smith; Vikram Vij	Anthony D'Ambrosio; Maurice Desharnais; **Whitney Mayes**; Jose Mendoza	February 20, 2014
9	"Offal to the Races"	Chuck Hughes; Vikram Vij; Anne Yarymowich	Martin Juneau; Paul McGreevy; Simon McNeil; **Trevor Ritchie**	February 27, 2014
10	"You Can't Win If You Don't Plate"	Chuck Hughes; Roger Mooking; Anne Yarymowich	Erik Kekes-Marshall; **Mark McCrowe**; Kirk Weiss; Kai Zyganiuk	March 6, 2014
11	"The Sweet Taste of Success"	Lynn Crawford; John Higgins; Vikram Vij	Lukas Gurtner; **Tammi McGee**; Jason Nolan; Damien Wilmot	March 13, 2014
12	"Slippery When Wet"	Lynn Crawford; Chuck Hughes; Susur Lee	Kieth Carlson; Sherry Gallinger; **Missy Hui**; Pieter Van Meenen	March 20, 2014
13	"A Wing and a Prayer"	Lynn Crawford; Chuck Hughes; Vikram Vij	Michael Dolente; Anthony Figliano; James Hannah; **Nicholas Wong**	March 27, 2014
14	"Slaying the Dragonfruit"	Susur Lee; Michael Smith; Vikram Vij	**Norman Aitken**; Bev Milnes; Justin Myles; Frank Sham	April 3, 2014
15	"High Steaks"	Lynn Crawford; John Higgins; Vikram Vij	Victor Bongo; Michael Luck; **Boris Rubtsov**; Brett Turnbull	April 10, 2014
16	"For the Love of Cod"	Lynn Crawford; John Higgins; Michael Smith	**Jayke Carter**; Audie Grant; David Husereau; Ian Thompson	April 17, 2014
17	"The Young and the Timeless"	John Higgins; Chuck Hughes; Roger Mooking	Toivo Heyduck; Carolyn Jones; **Derek Pennell**; Philip Tarlo	April 24, 2014
18	"When Life Hands You Lemonade"	Lynn Crawford; John Higgins; Roger Mooking	Pascal Bisson; **Neil Dowson**; Jesse Mutch; Doreen Prei	May 1, 2014
19	"Snakes and Batters"	Chuck Hughes; Roger Mooking; Vikram Vij	Craig D'Cruze; Julian Harries-Jones; Miriam Martinez; **Jessica Pelland**	May 8, 2014
20	"The Spruce is Loose"	Lynn Crawford; Roger Mooking; Anne Yarymowich	Bruno Feldeisen; Takumi Kitamura; Alex Svenne; **JohnRoss Woodland**	May 15, 2014
21	"Pressed for Ham"	Susur Lee; Michael Smith; Anne Yarymowich	Subra Balakrishnan; **Matthew Pennell**; Derek Ralph; Tony Velinov	May 22, 2014
22	"Showdown at the Oka Corral"	Lynn Crawford; Michael Smith; Anne Yarymowich	Tobias Grignon; **Stephanie Schoales**; Johnathan Sobol; Daniel Trottier	May 29, 2014
23	"That Wascally Wabbit"	Lynn Crawford; John Higgins; Roger Mooking	**Hayden Johnston**; Winston Hugh; Katherine MacDonald; Robert Mills	June 5, 2014
24	"One Flew Over the Cocoa Nest"	John Higgins; Chuck Hughes; Roger Mooking	**Daren Bergeron**; Romeo Oloresisimo; Christina Pugliese; Henry Strong	June 12, 2014
25	"Some Skin In the Game"	Chuck Hughes; Roger Mooking; Vikram Vij	Sheina Haddad; **Pierre Lamielle**; Abbey Solomon; Sue Wiebe	June 19, 2014
26	"Who Gives A Geoduck"	Susur Lee; Michael Smith; Vikram Vij	Matt Chandler; Huberto Sanchez; **Miheer Shete**; Evelynn Takoff	June 26, 2014

=== Season 2 ===
Chopped Canada Season 2 episodes
No. in series	Title	Judges	Competitors (Bold indicates Winner)	Original air date
27	"Kat-A-What?"	Eden Grinshpan; Michael Smith; Anne Yarymowich	Carol Christie; **Keith Hoare**; Brian McKenna; Mario Spina	January 10, 2015
28	"Holler For Challah"	Eden Grinshpan; Michael Smith; Anne Yarymowich	**Jack Demers**; Erin Harris; Bryan Simmons; Rob Thomas	January 17, 2015
29	"It's a Halva Day"	Lynn Crawford; John Higgins; Michael Smith	Becky Hood; Elizabeth Phillips; **Stacie Royds**; Hanna Sogo	January 24, 2015
30	"In A Pig's Ear"	Massimo Capra; Susur Lee; Roger Mooking	Jamie Huynh; Stefan Kuhn; Sébastien Laframboise; **Matthew Sullivan**	January 31, 2015
31	"Viewer's Choice: Land, Sea, Air"	Susur Lee; Roger Mooking; Antonio Park	**Dylan Draper**; Andrew Hajjar; Luc McCabe; Hunter J. Moyes	February 7, 2015
32	"How About Them Apples!"	Massimo Capra; Susur Lee; Roger Mooking	John Alvarez; **Brody Ashton**; Maru Eugenia Cacho; Patrick Mathieu	February 14, 2015
33	"Dippity Do What?"	Lynn Crawford; Susur Lee; Michael Smith	Justin Flood; Blythe Ogston; **Paddy Townsend**; Abraham Wornovitzky	February 21, 2015
34	"Steaking Their Claim"	Lynn Crawford; John Higgins; Antonio Park	Ted Dimoglou; David Jackman; Giuseppe Sacchetti; **Erin Smith**	December 26, 2014 (re-aired February 28, 2015)
35	"Every Round Has Its Thorns"	Massimo Capra; John Higgins; Michael Smith	**Janet Burnup**; Shane Chartrand; Roary MacPherson; Christine Moody	March 7, 2015
36	"A Brisket, A Basket"	Susur Lee; Michael Smith; Anne Yarymowich	Tania Ganassini; Bhavesh Karna; Line Lefebvre; **Daryle Ryo Nagata**	March 14, 2015
37	"Taken Out By Take Out"	Massimo Capra; John Higgins; Susur Lee	Alison Iannarelli; Stephanie O'Brien; **Alana Peckham**; Devon Thurston	March 21, 2015
38	"Crème de la Crop"	Lynn Crawford; Antonio Park; Anne Yarymowich	Gordon Desormeaux (aka Chef Dez); Adrian Forte; Stuart Saunders; **Kendra Smith**	March 28, 2015
39	"Fire In the Hole"	Massimo Capra; Lynn Crawford; Michael Smith	Caroline Brunet; Britney Condotta; Chris Doepner; **Angela Villalta**	April 4, 2015
40	"Fowl Play"	Massimo Capra; Lynn Crawford; Roger Mooking	Richard Baksh; Paul Ambrose Heighton; Dave Mottershall; **Anne Sorrenti**	April 11, 2015
41	"No Choking Around"	Massimo Capra; Lynn Crawford; John Higgins	Chris Batzios; Debbie Clauss; **Manny Ferreira**; Claudia Giermindl	April 18, 2015
42	"Can You Stomach This?"	Susur Lee; Roger Mooking; Antonio Park	Tim Kozody; Matt Schram; Krissy Seymour; **Wallace Wong**	April 25, 2015
43	"Leftovers: Recycle, Reuse, Reheat!"	Lynn Crawford; Michael Smith; Anne Yarymowich	Gaetano Ferrara; Tim Halley; Tom Lee; **Sean Reeve**	May 2, 2015
44	"Lost In Transformation"	Susur Lee; Antonio Park; Anne Yarymowich	Matt Duffy; **Charles-Emmanuel Pariseau**; Tara Pietroniro; Alex White	May 9, 2015
45	"One For The Family"	Roger Mooking; Michael Smith; Anne Yarymowich	Miguel Cervantes; **Ryan Gark**; Simon McGrath-Martel; Sharon Snow	May 16, 2015
46	"In The Name Of The Game"	Roger Mooking; Antonio Park; Anne Yarymowich	Nick Dompierre; **Barrie Elliot**; Gregory Galoska; Trevor McNeil	May 23, 2015
47	"Crabby Pans"	Eden Grinshpan; John Higgins; Susur Lee	Ben Leblanc; Chris MacDougall; **Matt Rosen**; Sonya Sammut	May 30, 2015
48	"Carnival: No Room For Seconds"	Eden Grinshpan; Roger Mooking; Anne Yarymowich	**Roger Andrews**; Beth Hume; Cameron MacDonald; Colin Robin	June 6, 2015
49	"Rib 'N Roll"	Massimo Capra; John Higgins; Susur Lee	**Sonia Cuffy**; Janice Mackay; Kory Mills; David Omar	June 13, 2015
50	"Everything But The Kitchen Sink"	Lynn Crawford; Roger Mooking; Michael Smith	**Mathieu Masson-Duceppe**; Heather Porteous; Ryan Rajkumar; Zac Zorisky	June 20, 2015
51	"The World Is Your Lobster"	Lynn Crawford; Antonio Park; Anne Yarymowich	Justin Bonney; **Brock Bowes**; Seika Groves; Damian Liengme	June 27, 2015
52	"Cookin' At The Savoy"	Lynn Crawford; John Higgins; Antonio Park	Shane Chartrand; **Marcia Dellepoort**; Alon Fuks; Harley MacIntyre	July 4, 2015

=== Season 3 Teen Tournament ===
Chopped Canada Season 3 Teen Tournament episodes
No. in series	Title	Judges	Competitors (Bold indicates Winner)	Original air date
53	"Dukkah-ing It Out"	Massimo Capra; Susur Lee; Anne Yarymowich	**Yohannes Asres**; Noah Assayag; Jade Lockie; Alexandra Meshcherecova	November 28, 2015
54	"Lunchbox Letdown"	Massimo Capra; Susur Lee; Anne Yarymowich	Kenny Carey-Kochan; **Irelyn Dacosta**; Victoria Jennings; Maximillian Koczka	December 5, 2015
55	"Clawing To The Win"	Lynn Crawford; Antonio Park; Michael Smith	**Justice Chea**; Logan Hepditch; Cole Millard; Marianne Paquin	December 12, 2015
56	"In A Deep Fried Pickle"	Lynn Crawford; Antonio Park; Michael Smith	**Emilia Augello**; Kendall Bouvette; Alex Lebel; Skylar Sinow	December 19, 2015
57	"Higher Steaks" (Teen Tournament Finale)	Lynn Crawford; Susur Lee; Antonio Park	Yohannes Asres; **Emilia Augello**; Justice Chea; Irelyn Dacosta	December 26, 2015

=== Season 3 ===
Chopped Canada Season 3 episodes
No. in series	Title	Judges	Competitors (Bold indicates Winner)	Original air date
58	"Sauce On The Side"	Massimo Capra; Eden Grinshpan; Antonio Park	**Emma Beqaj**; Richard Moore; Sandro Pangilinan; William Wallace	January 9, 2016
59	"Batter Battle"	Eden Grinshpan; Mark McEwan; Antonio Park	David Antonucci; Christina D'Angela; **Erica Hakien**; Robert McKim	January 16, 2016
60	"Rice Twice"	Eden Grinshpan; John Higgins; Antonio Park	Kate Dean; Ashley Dolbec; **François Lavallée**; Qamar Masood	January 23, 2016
61	"Return to Victory" (Redemption Episode)	Lynn Crawford; Susur Lee; Roger Mooking	Matt Binkley; Steve Glavicich; Erin Harris; **Sébastien Laframboise**	January 30, 2016
62	"Cooking With Courage"	Lynn Crawford; John Higgins; Anne Yarymowich	Amanda Finkle; **Josh Karbelnik**; Derek McCann; Stephanie Randall	February 6, 2016
63	"All About the Bass"	Lynn Crawford; Antonio Park; Anne Yarymowich	Jean-Philippe Miron; **Alexander Molitz**; Kyle Christofferson; Nathalie Des Rosiers	February 13, 2016
64	"Shell Shocked"	Massimo Capra; Eden Grinshpan; Michael Smith	**Pam Fanjoy**; Magda Louis-Jean; Chris Oliveira; Nathan Reid	February 20, 2016
65	"What the Shell?"	John Higgins; Michael Smith; Anne Yarymowich	Sharon Guiel; Brian Magee; **Jody Sigurdson-Longo**; Ted Pace	February 27, 2016
66	"Duelling Over Devilled Eggs"	John Higgins; Michael Smith; Anne Yarymowich	**Melanie Robinson**; Lynda Smith; Paresh Thakkar; Dan Worth	March 5, 2016
67	"Fish Become Sausages"	Lynn Crawford; Mark McEwan; Roger Mooking	Allison Kulik; **Valentino Pereira**; Scott Starkweather; Mark Steele	March 12, 2016
68	"Cooking With Heart"	Lynn Crawford; Susur Lee; Roger Mooking	Cobey Adams; TJ Crafter; **Lyndsay Jones**; Cosmo Spina	March 19, 2016
69	"Bro-Down Showdown"	Mark McEwan; Roger Mooking; Anne Yarymowich	Dany Sok; **Pete Sok**; Bijou Texeira; Imrun Texeira	March 26, 2016
70	"Win By A Hare"	Susur Lee; Mark McEwan; Michael Smith	**Dennis Peckham**; James Santon; Hilarie Vatcher; Olivier Vigneault	April 2, 2016
71	"Rabbit Roundabout"	Massimo Capra; Eden Grinshpan; John Higgins	**Matthew Kershaw**; Jean-Philippe St-Denis; Tallis Voakes; Travis "Catfish" Olfers	April 9, 2016
72	"Full of Beans"	Roger Mooking; Susur Lee; Mark McEwan	Jaimie Delson; **Kaya Ogruce**; Navita Singh; Kenny Kaechele	April 16, 2016
73	"Sweet Success"	Massimo Capra; Eden Grinshpan; Antonio Park	Michael Hunter; Mike Duarte; Nicholas Bramos; **Ivana Raca**	April 23, 2016
74	"Something's Fishy"	Mark McEwan; Eden Grinshpan; Roger Mooking	**Keith Pears**; Derrick Uniat; Andrew Hodge; Scott Bailey	April 30, 2016
75	"Pepper Powerhouse"	Michael Smith; Eden Grinshpan; Massimo Capra	John Chad; **Krish Nair**; Kylie d'Entremont; Kevin Koohtow	May 7, 2016
76	"Candy is Dandy"	Mark McEwan; Anne Yarymowich; Susur Lee	Robbie Brooks; **Jonathan Tomlin**; Luke Willingdon; Holly Verboom	May 14, 2016
77	"Helping Hands"	Massimo Capra; Eden Grinshpan; John Higgins	Josh Gale; **Arron Carley**; David Braaten; Angie Mohr	September 3, 2016
78	"Cooking La Vida Loca"	John Higgins; Micheal Smith; Eden Grinspan	Steve Gonzales; **Nick Valliquette**; JR Perras; Zach Thompson	September 10, 2016
79	"Redemption – Gone Too Soon"	Massimo Capra; Micheal Smith; Anne Yarymowich	Micheal Luck; **Roary McPherson**; Anthony D’Ambrosio; Elizabeth Philipps	September 17, 2016
80	"Dill-icious"			September 24, 2016
81	"Cooking For Love"			October 1, 2016
82	"Desert Dilemma"			October 8, 2016
83	"Keep On Truckin'"			October 15, 2016

=== Season 4 ===
Chopped Canada Season 4 episodes
No. in series	Title	Judges	Competitors (Bold indicates Winner)	Original air date
84	"Going Crackers"			October 16, 2016
85	"O for Cake's Sake"			October 23, 2016
86	"Put a Pork in It"			October 30, 2016
87	"Live Life with Spice"			November 6, 2016
88	"Hook, Line and Sinker"			November 13, 2016
89	"Escargot Away"			November 20, 2016
90	"Judge or Be Judged"			November 26, 2016
91	"Grandmas Go for Broke"			December 3, 2016
92	"Fired Up"			December 10, 2016
93	"Celebrity Challenge"			December 17, 2016
94	"Crash and Burn"			January 14, 2017
95	"From the Ground Up"			January 21, 2017
96	"Clammy Hands, Warm Heart"			January 28, 2017
97	"Pie for Dessert"			February 4, 2017
98	"Mirin, Mirin on the Wall"			February 11, 2017

== See also ==
- List of Chopped episodes
- List of Chopped Junior episodes
- List of Chopped Sweets episodes
