= Meeru Dhalwala =

Indo-Canadian chef and author

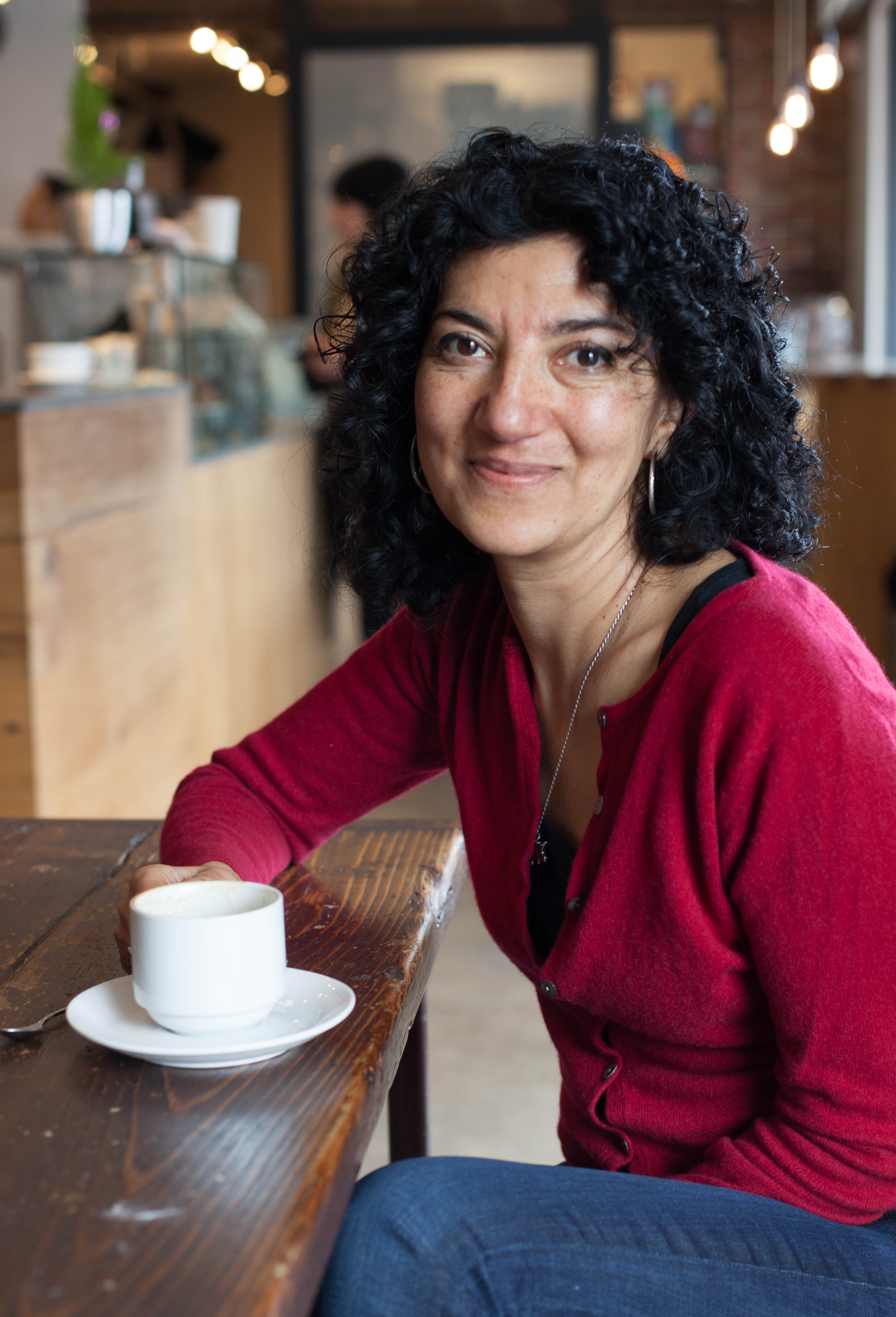
- Meeru Dhalwala
- Born: October 1964 (age 61–62); Amritsar, Punjab, India
- Known for: Vij's and Lila restaurants (Vancouver), Joy of Feeding

Meeru Dhalwala is a restaurateur, chef, public speaker, and cookbook author. She is one of Vancouver’s most prominent promoters of women in business, climate change and sustainability, and healthy-elegant home cooking. She co-owned the restaurants Vij's and Rangoli and currently co-owns Lila in Vancouver, British Columbia.

== Early life and education ==
Meeru Dhalwala was born in Delhi, India in October 1964. In winter of 1969, she moved to Washington, D.C., with her parents. She was raised in Northern Virginia. She lived in D.C. in her adult years, until she moved permanently to Vancouver, BC in February 1995. Dhalwala attended the University of Bath in England, and holds a Master of Science in Development Studies.

== Career ==
Prior to 1995, Dhalwala was in human rights and international development work. She worked as Program Manager for the Committee of Human Rights at the U.S. National Academy of Sciences. After receiving her MSc, Dhalwala volunteered in India for the Self Employed Women's Association in Ahmedabad, Gujarat. She then worked in Washington, D.C. on various development projects in Rwanda, Uganda, and Malawi.

Dhalwala is co-founder of Vij's with her then-husband Vikram Vij and Lila restaurants (May 2024 to present). For almost 30 years, she created all the recipes, menus and ran the kitchen at Vij's. She also co-founded and ran Rangoli market and restaurant from 2003 to 2020 (Rangoli closed due to the COVID-19 pandemic). In 2002, Dhalwala created the concept and design of boil-a-bag, sustainably sourced, and modern Indian foods and worked with designer Marc Bricault on the packaging and labels. With Bricault, she trademarked and created the ‘elephant and 3 stars’ logo for Vij’s at Home packaged meals and spices.

By 2003, Mark Bittman of the New York Times was praising Vij's Restaurant as "easily among the finest Indian restaurants in the world".

In 2004, Dhalwala and Vij opened up a second restaurant and market called Rangoli. Both restaurants became known for having an all female kitchen staff, having all come from the Punjab of India. Along with the restaurant recipes, Dhalwala created recipes for Vij's Inspired Indian Cuisine, a line of prepackaged gourmet curries. The product line is sold in grocery stores across British Columbia, and other regions.

In November 2012, Dhalwala launched a new Indian restaurant, Shanik, in Seattle, Washington. Shanik received a James Beard nomination as a semifinalist for 2012 Best New Restaurant in the United States. Shanik closed in March 2015. During her time as chef of Shanik, Meeru wrote guest chef recipes in the column Slow Food Fast for the Wall Street Journal.

Meeru Dhalwala has written three cookbooks, co-authored with Vikram Vij. In 2006, Dhalwala penned the first, Vij's: Elegant and Inspired Indian Cuisine, which won several awards in 2007, including Cuisine Canada's Gold Award for Best Cookbook and Cordon d'Or Gold Ribbon International Cookbook Award. The book also took first place in the reference category at the Alcuin Society Awards for Excellence in Book Design. In 2010, she penned Vij's at Home: Relax Honey, which placed second in the Best Indian Cuisine Book in the World category at the 2010 Gourmand World Cookbook Awards, and received silver at the Canadian Culinary Book Awards. Her third book, Vij's Indian: Our Cherished Recipes and Stories was released in 2016 and was shortlisted for best Indian Cookbook at the 2017 Gourmand International World Cookbook Awards.

In 2022, Dhalwala launched My Bambiri Foods, an online organic baby and toddler food company. My Bambiri foods are sold via a three-tiered pricing model, where customers select the price they will pay, based on their incomes and financial agency.

In May 2024, Dhalwala opened Lila, a modern Indian pescetarian/vegetarian restaurant, with co-founder Shira Blustein (of the Acorn restaurant). The same year, she created recipes for a successful collaboration with Fresh Prep, a meal-kit delivery service in B.C. and Alberta.

== Advocacy and Community Contributions ==
Dhalwala believes in supporting local business and agriculture, and is committed to improving her business environmental footprint. Within her restaurants, Dhalwala takes strides to build long-term relationships with local farmers and other local suppliers in order to source produce, seafood and meats that align with her philosophy. Meeru was a pioneer in the use of crickets in gourmet cooking, bringing attention to their potential as a sustainable protein. She developed a recipe for cricket paranthas, which were on the menu at both Vij's and Shanik and an Indian cricket pizza, served at Rangoli. She is working to have them farmed locally.

Dhalwala is active in the community and was a board member of Vancouver Farmers Markets (2010-2013, 2014-2017) . With her restaurant in Seattle, she worked to build relationships with Oregon and Washington farmers, just as she did in British Columbia with her Vancouver restaurants. She currently serves on the board of IC-IMPACTS (India-Canada Centre for Innovative Multidisciplinary Partnerships to Accelerate Community Transformation and Sustainability) (2019–present). She has been a judge for Canada's Outstanding Young Farmer Awards and has been a member of Les Dames D'Escoffier, B.C. Chapter since 2010.

Dhalwala actively researches topics around food, the environment and health. This plays a key role in developing her recipes. Dhalwala is particularly interested in sharing her cooking skills with parents who wish to feed their families in a way that is "easy, delicious and healthy". Dhalwala shared her ideas through her regular monthly column in The Vancouver Sun, titled Food for Thought, and a regular Point Person for CBC Radio's 2009 national show The Point. Dhalwala hosts annual cooking shows at the Bowery Whole Foods Kitchen in New York City.

Dhalwala is founder and co-organizer of the Joy of Feeding, an annual international food fair held at the UBC Farm in Vancouver. The event serves a fundraiser for the farm and combines a focus on culture, health and the environment. It features around 16 home cooks from various heritages and professions, sharing their home style of comfort foods. Most of the food is sourced organically and/or locally. Dhalwala's vision is to grow the event to "a worldwide Joy of Feeding day where various communities throughout the world gather together to feature and share their home cooked meals".

== Awards and Distinctions ==
Vij's was named Vancouver Magazine Best Indian Restaurant from 1995-2015.

In 2019, Dhalwala was inducted into the British Columbia Restaurant Hall of Fame for "her excellence as a chef and a mentor to women chefs and cooks. "

In 2022, Dhalwala received Vancouver Magazine's Lifetime Achievement Award.

Dhalwala won the WORTH (Women of Restaurant, Tourism, and Hospitality) Association's Woman of Worth Empower award in 2023.

In 2024, Dhalawala received the Restaurants Canada Award for Culinary Excellence, for "honouring those who harmonize culinary expertise with unparalleled creativity, celebrating a wide array of flavours and cuisines while prioritizing sustainability and a consistent commitment to high-quality culinary service. "

Dhalwala holds honorary doctorates from both Simon Fraser University (2015) and the University of British Columbia (2016). Her citation from UBC notes her work "to create networks of local farmers and suppliers; to provide respectful employment opportunities for immigrant women, and to provide leadership to local sustainability organizations" and indicates that she was both a fundraising leader for the Centre for Sustainable Food Systems at UBC Farm and a mentor for Social Entrepreneurship students in the Sauder School of Business.

== Bibliography ==
- Vij's: Elegant and Inspired Indian Cuisine, with Vikram Vij. Douglas & McIntyre, 2006. ISBN 1553651847.
- Vij's at Home: Relax, Honey: The Warmth and Ease of Indian Cooking, with Vikram Vij. Douglas & McIntyre, 2011. ISBN 1553655729.
- Vij's Indian: Our Stories, Spices, and Cherished Recipes, with Vikram Vij. Penguin Random House, 2016. ISBN 9780143194224
