= Wall of Chefs =

Canadian reality television series

- Genre: Cooking, competition
- Presented by: Noah Cappe
- Countries of origin: Canada, United States
- No. of seasons: 2
- No. of episodes: 30

Production
- Production company: Insight Productions

Original release
- Network: Food Network
- Release: February 3, 2020 – March 7, 2022

Wall of Chefs is a Canadian-American reality television series, which premiered February 3, 2020 on Food Network. Hosted by Noah Cappe, the series features four amateur home chefs per episode competing in culinary challenges, judged by a rotating panel featuring some of Canada's and America's most prominent chefs and restaurateurs. After each round, one of the competitors is eliminated, and the winner of the episode is awarded $10,000.

The series features three rounds of challenges: "Crowd-Pleaser", where all four competitors are asked to prepare their own most popular dish; "Chef's Fridge", in which the three remaining competitors are challenged to create a dish using three ingredients revealed by one of the professional chefs as staple ingredients in their own fridges; and "Restaurant-Worthy", in which the two finalists are challenged to create a restaurant-calibre dish inspired by one of the judges' own signature dishes.

Twelve chefs appear as the "Wall of Chefs" on each episode, with four of them judging each round before all of the chefs vote on the final winner of the episode. A total of 33 chefs appeared overall throughout the first season of the series, including Hugh Acheson, Suzanne Barr, Massimo Capra, Alex Chen, Lynn Crawford, Christine Cushing, Rob Feenie, Rob Gentile, Susur Lee, Nick Liu, Dale MacKay, Mark McEwan and Todd Perrin.

The series is produced by Insight Productions. It received a Canadian Screen Award nomination for Best Reality/Competition Series at the 9th Canadian Screen Awards in 2021.

== Episodes ==
| No. | Title | Original release date | Viewers (millions) |
|---|---|---|---|
| 1 | "Welcome to the Wall" | 3 February 2020 | n/a |
Challenges: Chef's Fridge: Set by Mark McEwan. Ricotta cheese, sriracha, leeks.; Restaurant Worthy: Set by Renée Lavallée. Create a restaurant quality Lobster dish.; Competitors: Charlie Cacapit, 27, Winnipeg, MB; Christopher Mask, 44, Wahnapitae, ON; Nicole King, 32, Toronto, ON; Susy Danelon, 54, Toronto, ON
| 2 | "Bing Bam Boom" | 10 February 2020 | n/a |
Challenges: Chef's Fridge: Set by Massimo Capra. Pancetta, sun-dried tomatoes, heirloom carrots.; Restaurant Worthy: Set by Christa Bruneau-Guenther. Create a restaurant-worthy pizza reflecting the competitor's cultural background.; Competitors: Cheryl Torrance, 50, Toronto, ON; Jennilee Vaneltsi, 36, Fort McPherson, NT; Joe McLaren, 37, Toronto, ON; Mark Sheane, 32, Langley, BC
| 3 | "Buon Appetito!" | 17 February 2020 | n/a |
Challenges: Chef's Fridge: Set by Joël Watanabe. Pecorino, Japanese soy sauce, arugula.; Restaurant Worthy: Set by Rob Gentile. Create a restaurant caliber rice dish.; Competitors: Alice Okundaye, 30, Toronto, ON; Amita Massey, 19, Calgary, AB; Joseph Gasdia, 35, Toronto, ON; Silvio Zampieri, 60, Abbotsford, BC
| 4 | "Whipped Herbed Cheese" | 23 February 2020 | n/a |
Challenges: Chef's Fridge: Set by Hugh Acheson. Miso paste, whipped cheese, celery.; Restaurant Worthy: Set by Darren MacLean. Create a restaurant-quality noodle soup.; Competitors: Christine Pattison, 47, Winnipeg, MB; James Deveaux, 33, Halifax, NS; Kevin Murphy, 33, London, ON; Mary Rocto, 50, Toronto, ON
| 5 | "Gobble It Up" | 1 March 2020 | n/a |
Challenges: Chef's Fridge: Set by Lynn Crawford. Maple syrup, spinach, parmigiano reggiano.; Restaurant Worthy: Set by Nick Hodge. Create a restaurant quality version of Street Food.; Competitors: Aaron Hewitt, 42, Toronto, ON; Chris Dunne, 29, St. John’s, NL; Danielle Finestone, 27, Toronto, ON; Janine Woods, 52, Calgary, AB
| 6 | "Mac 'n Cheese Please!" | 9 March 2020 | n/a |
Challenges: Chef's Fridge: Set by Shane Chartrand. Speck, cottage cheese, squash.; Restaurant Worthy: Set by Suzanne Barr. Create an elevated Macaroni and Cheese dish.; Competitors: Alison Anderson, 37, Toronto, ON; Jason Orban, 39, Osoyoos, BC; Minal Abhange, 31, Stephenville, NL; Ryan Johnson, 42, Toronto, ON
| 7 | "One Protein Two Ways" | 16 March 2020 | n/a |
Challenges: Chef's Fridge: Set by Michele Forgione. 'Nduja, burrata, cauliflower.; Restaurant Worthy: Set by Susur Lee. Prepare a restaurant quality dish showing one protein prepared in two different ways.; Competitors: Cindy Meays, 46, Kamloops, BC; Ian Tyson, 48, St. Thomas, ON; Kyle Crawford, 29, Halifax, NS; Sabrina Santer, 28, Toronto, ON
| 8 | "Duelling Desserts" | 23 March 2020 | n/a |
Challenges: Chef's Fridge: Set by Dale Mackay. Brie, garlic, rapini.; Restaurant Worthy: Set by Guy Rawlings. Create a restaurant-caliber dessert.; Competitors: Alexandra Hicks, 29, Niagara-on-the-Lake, ON; Bee Zhou, 45, Edmonton, AB; Crystal Leptich, 34, Saskatoon, SK; Josh Prince, 32, Toronto, ON
| 9 | "Southern Comfort" | 30 March 2020 | n/a |
Challenges: Chef's Fridge: Set by Corinna Mozo. Taro root, chipotle peppers in adobo, cilantro.; Restaurant Worthy: Set by Hugh Acheson. Create a restaurant quality dish inspired by the American South.; Competitors: Jeff Brown, 32, Toronto, ON; Justine Balin, 20, Vancouver, BC; Lucas Alves Debien, 31, Winnipeg, MB; Narida Mohammed, 37, Etobicoke, ON
| 10 | "The Secret's in the Sauce" | 6 April 2020 | n/a |
Challenges: Chef's Fridge: Set by Rob Feenie. Gem lettuce, Dijon mustard, merguez sausage.; Restaurant Worthy: Set by Alex Chen. Create a restaurant quality dish where the sauce is the main highlight.; Competitors: Adam Kelly, 25, Toronto, ON; Brooke Shutiak, 28, Saskatoon, SK; Mel Heng, 47, Mississauga, ON; Natasha Sharpe, 45, Mount Pearl, NL
| 11 | "Pop the Champagne" | 1 September 2020 | n/a |
Challenges: Chef's Fridge: Set by Susur Lee. Romano beans, lemon, dandelion greens.; Restaurant Worthy: Set by Christie Peters. Create a restaurant quality classic dish, but with the competitor's own creative twist.; Competitors: Roman Szostak, 58, Utopia, ON; Cindy Billingham, 52, Whitehorse, YT; Jordan McKenzie, 31, Muskoka, ON; Joe Tong, 31, Vancouver, BC
| 12 | "Surf & Surf and Turf & Turf" | 8 September 2020 | n/a |
Challenges: Chef's Fridge: Set by Nuit Regular. Tofu, chilies, oyster sauce.; Restaurant Worthy: Set by Rob Feenie. Create a restaurant quality Surf n' Turf dish.; Competitors: Carmen Lee, 33, Winnipeg, MB; Jordan Raymond, 31, Saskatoon, SK; Lindsay Brun, 42, Anjou, QC; Max Valiquette, 46, Toronto, ON
| 13 | "A Jacuzzi of Butter" | 15 September 2020 | n/a |
Challenges: Chef's Fridge: Set by Christine Cushing. Feta cheese, fennel, sherry.; Restaurant Worthy: Set by Victor Barry. Create a restaurant caliber chicken dish.; Competitors: Mary Budgell, 34, Halifax, NS; Razan Khan, 30, Mississauga, ON; Nicolas Mongeon, 21, Sudbury, ON; Tammy Wood, 46, Agassiz, BC
| 14 | "The Power of Peperoncini" | 22 September 2020 | n/a |
Challenges: Chef's Fridge: Set by Danny Smiles. Mayonnaise, peperoncini, Brussels sprouts.; Restaurant Worthy: Set by Fisun Ercan. Create a restaurant-calibre vegetarian dish.; Competitors: Anna Bondoc, 31, Toronto, ON; Shauna Lindzon, 49, Toronto, ON; Marc Swiednicki, 47, Montreal, QC; Bill Medak, 73, Edmonton, AB
| 15 | "Thyme Will Tell" | 29 September 2020 | n/a |
Challenges: Chef's Fridge: Set by Jesse Vergen. Hakurei turnip, aged cheddar cheese, thyme.; Restaurant Worthy: Set by Marysol Foucault. Create a restaurant caliber brunch dish.; Competitors: Andres Araneda, 33, Regina, SK; Bri Young, 19, Winnipeg, MB; Helen Hibbert, 48, London, ON; Ross Di Stefano, 45, Vaughan, ON
| 16 | "Wee, That's Fire!" | 6 October 2020 | n/a |
Challenges: Chef's Fridge: Set by Nick Liu. Wasabi, sour cream, plums.; Restaurant Worthy: Set by Dale Mackay. Create a restaurant quality lamb dish.; Competitors: Tabassum Wyne, 32, Milton, ON; Gaetano Corbo, 24, Vaughan, ON; Domingo Lumanog, 35, Calgary, AB; Clotilde Friedmann, 60, Longueuil, QC
| 17 | "Burger Wars" | 13 October 2020 | n/a |
Challenges: Chef's Fridge: Set by Jinhee Lee. Gochujang, eggs, cabbage.; Restaurant Worthy: Set by Mark McEwan. Create a deluxe hamburger.; Competitors: Kelsey Glaser, 26, Toronto, ON; Louis Milo, 51, Oshawa, ON; Jason Pon, 24, Toronto, ON; Alexis Hillyard, 37, Edmonton, AB
| 18 | "See-Food" | 20 October 2020 | n/a |
Challenges: Chef's Fridge: Set by Alida Solomon. Capers, basil, Greek yogurt.; Restaurant Worthy: Set by Todd Perrin. Create a dish featuring fish or seafood.; Competitors: Brandi England, 34, Vancouver, BC; John Cannella, 32, Aurora, ON; Ernie Chow, 26, Toronto, ON; Janice Doerksen, 56, Langley, BC
| 19 | "Game Faces On" | 27 October 2020 | n/a |
Challenges: Chef's Fridge: Set by Mandel Hitzer. Blue cheese, broccoli, chorizo.; Restaurant Worthy: Set by Christine Cushing. Create a restaurant quality pasta dish.; Competitors: Ahsan Sadiq, 33, Montreal, QC; Ashley Hoar, 24, Hamilton, ON; Billy Snaychuk, 44, Parksville, BC; Giota Diakopoulos, 46, Oakville, ON
| 20 | "Your Average Meat and Potatoes" | 3 November 2020 | n/a |
Challenges: Chef's Fridge: Set by Meeru Dhalwala. Coconut milk, chickpeas, kale.; Restaurant Worthy: Set by Lynn Crawford. Create a restaurant quality meat and potatoes dish.; Competitors: Paddy O’Neill, 58, Spruce Grove, AB; Julia Mark, 33, Burnaby, BC; Meredith Youngson, 29, Toronto, ON; Sammy Farid, 35, Toronto, ON
| 21 | "Smoke Show" | 3 January 2022 | n/a |
Competitors: Chef's Fridge: Set by Todd Perrin. Cremini mushrooms, Indonesian chili paste, kelp.; Restaurant Worthy: Set by Christine Cushing. Create a dish inspired by the competitor's childhood.; Contestants: Eseosa Babatunde, 28, Hamilton, ON; Mitchell Yaholnitsky, 35, Toronto, ON; Nancy MacLellan, 57, Halifax, NS; Johnny Trinh, 40, Vancouver, BC
| 22 | "Herbes Salées" | 10 January 2022 | n/a |
Challenges: Chef's Fridge: Set by Marysol Foucault. Beets, creme fraiche, herbes salees.; Restaurant Worthy: Set by Roger Mooking. Create a dish featuring a variety of textures.; Competitors: Tracy Palmer, 43, Edmonton, AB; Mike Gabel, 47, Toronto, ON; Winnie Xu, 21, White Rock, BC; Adam Kahgee, 39, Port Elgin, ON
| 23 | "Make it Special" | 17 January 2022 | n/a |
Challenges: Chef's Fridge: Set by Jae-Anthony Dougan. Avocado, pineapple, Bajan hot sauce.; Restaurant Worthy: Set by Alida Solomon. Create a dish inspired by personal travels.; Competitors: Beth Dangerfield, 43, Toronto, ON; Tabby Radira, 43, Sainte-Hyacinthe, QC; Michael Schroeder, 35, Brooklyn Corner, NS; Nicole Ratti, 27, Toronto, ON
| 24 | "Salad Days" | 24 January 2022 | n/a |
Challenges: Chef's Fridge: Set by Meeru Dhalwala. Eggplant, green onion, fish sauce.; Restaurant Worthy: Set by Hugh Acheson. Create a main dish worthy salad.; Competitors: Kenna Deo, 31, Nanaimo, BC; AJ Clarke, 34, Mississauga, ON; Laura Lopez, 21, Edmonton, AB; Bryan Rice, 41, Regina, SK
| 25 | "Winner Br’inner" | 31 January 2022 | n/a |
Challenges: Chef's Fridge: Set by Danny Smiles. Zucchini, za'atar, honey.; Restaurant Worthy: Set by Kelsey Johnson. Transform breakfast into a decadent dinner dish.; Competitors: Deborah Sargeant, 36, Brampton, ON; Michael Nardozza, 35, Montreal, QC; Melissa Jones, 40, Russell, ON; Robert Kowbel, 34, Victoria, BC
| 26 | "Oh, it's Gonna be Charred" | 7 February 2022 | n/a |
Challenges: Chef's Fridge: Set by Rob Feenie. Baby potatoes, serrano peppers, anchovies.; Restaurant Worthy: Set By Nuit Regular. Create a restaurant quality dish appropriate to be served in a bowl.; Competitors: Eesa Gonzales, 20, Oshawa, ON; Tammy Sweeney, 53, Saskatoon, SK; Jeff Wong, 42, Ajax, ON; Najwa Cagnin, 47, Ancaster, ON
| 27 | "A Towering Occasion" | 14 February 2022 | n/a |
Challenges: Chef's Fridge: Set by Daniela Manrique Lucca. Manchego cheese, peas, black garlic paste.; Restaurant Worthy: Set by Alex Chen.. Create a dish appropriate for a special occasion celebration.; Competitors: Grayden Meulenaar, 25, Belleville, ON; Brenda Hutch, 53, Regina, SK; Christian Giaconi-Bonaguro, 31, Barrie, ON; Junelle Knihniski, 23, Saskatoon, SK
| 28 | "Boppity-Boopi" | 21 February 2022 | n/a |
Challenges: Chef's Fridge: Set by Christa Bruneau-Guenther. Pine nuts, Swiss chard, birch syrup.; Restaurant Worthy: Set by Massimo Capra. Create an eye-catchingly colourful restaurant quality dish.; Competitors: Michael Campoli, 23, Montreal, QC; Ellie Hadley, 37, Port Alberni, BC; Josh Allen, 46, Toronto, ON; Preeti Ravi, 33, Toronto, ON
| 29 | "Turkey Dinner" | 28 February 2022 | n/a |
Challenges: Chef's Fridge: Set by Suzanne Barr. Tamarind paste, oranges, chayote.; Restaurant Worthy: Set by Mark McEwan. Create a restaurant caliber Turkey dish.; Competitors: Tatiana Marcelin, 34, Montreal, QC; Gilbert Proulx, 35, Regina, SK; Nokey Yutamanop, 32, Bowmanville, ON; Manpreet Gosal, 48, Markham, ON
| 30 | "Summer Dayz" | 7 March 2022 | n/a |
Challenges: Chef's Fridge: Set by Lynn Crawford. Bacon, shallots, spicy brown mustard.; Restaurant Worthy: Set by Shawn Adler. Create a restaurant quality summer dish.; Competitors: Dee (Diana) Aitchison, 47, Victoria, BC; Shay Vannery, 31, New Westminster, BC; Keira Tidmand, 23, Milton, ON; Steve Camara, 37, Beamsville, ON
