= List of pepper sauces =

The following is a list of pepper sauces. Pepper sauce may refer generally to sauces made with black pepper, Sichuan pepper, or chili peppers, or to the following dishes:

- Bajan pepper sauce
- Chili sauce
- Peppercorn sauce
- Harrisa
- Sauce poivrade
- Shito
- Zhug
