= Akidi =

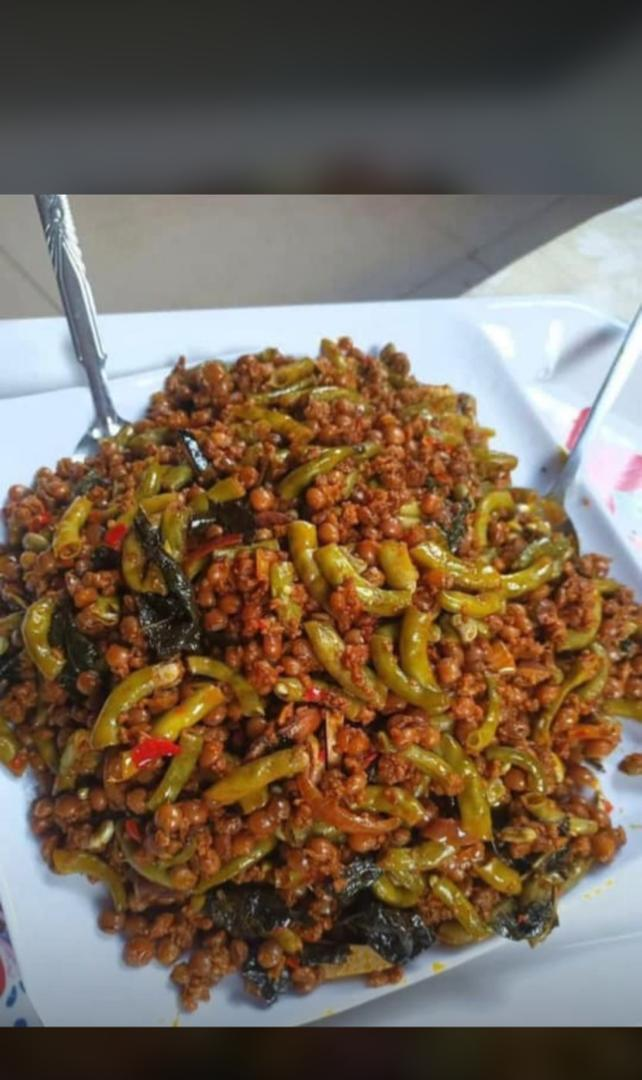
- Akidi
- Alternative names: Black-eyed peas
- Type: Traditional Nigerian food
- Place of origin: South East (Nigeria)
- Region or state: Igbo
- Main ingredients: Black-eyed peas; Palm oil
- Ingredients generally used: Crayfish; Fried fish

Akidi, also known as Akidi beans, is a delicacy popular among the Igbo people of southeastern Nigeria. It is made from freshly harvested black-eyed peas and garnished with palm oil and other local seasonings.

== Overview ==
It is easy to cook and has a clean, grassy flavor. It can be garnished with African eggplant and enjoyed as breakfast or lunch. Akidi is a nutrient-dense legume known for its high protein content. The ingredients used in preparing it include:

- black-eyed peas (akidi)
- onion
- scotch bonnet peppers
- palm oil
- dried crayfish
- salt
- black pepper
- stock cube
- Water

Akidi is a quick food that can be prepared between 10 - 15 minutes.

== Health benefits ==
Based on its nutritional composition, half a cup of cooked Akidi contains 23 mg of calcium, 7.5 g of dietary fiber, 114 kcal of energy, and 20.39 g of carbohydrates. Its nutritional value also makes it a good source of Vitamin K, zinc, iron, magnesium, and potassium, making it a suitable local source of a balanced diet.

== Gallery ==
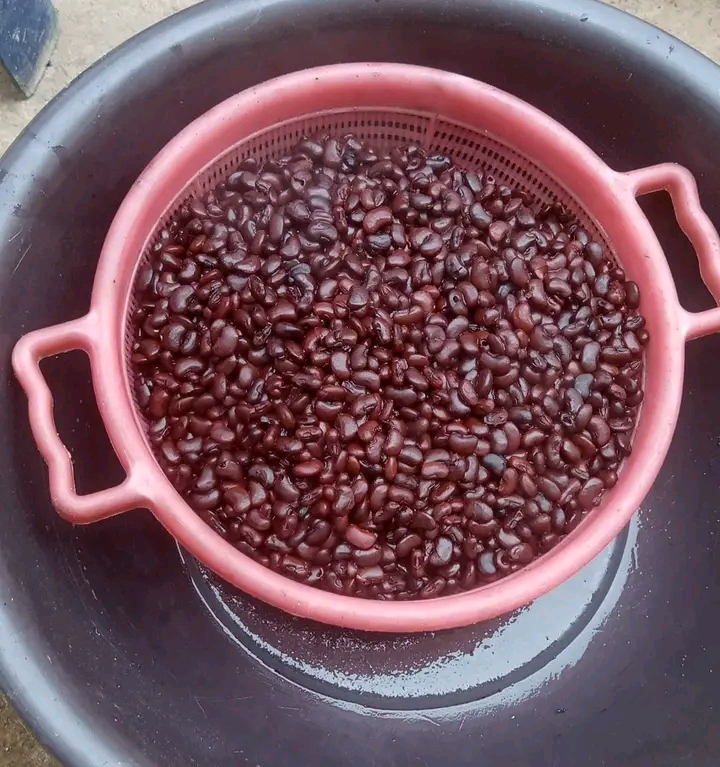
Akidi (Local beans)

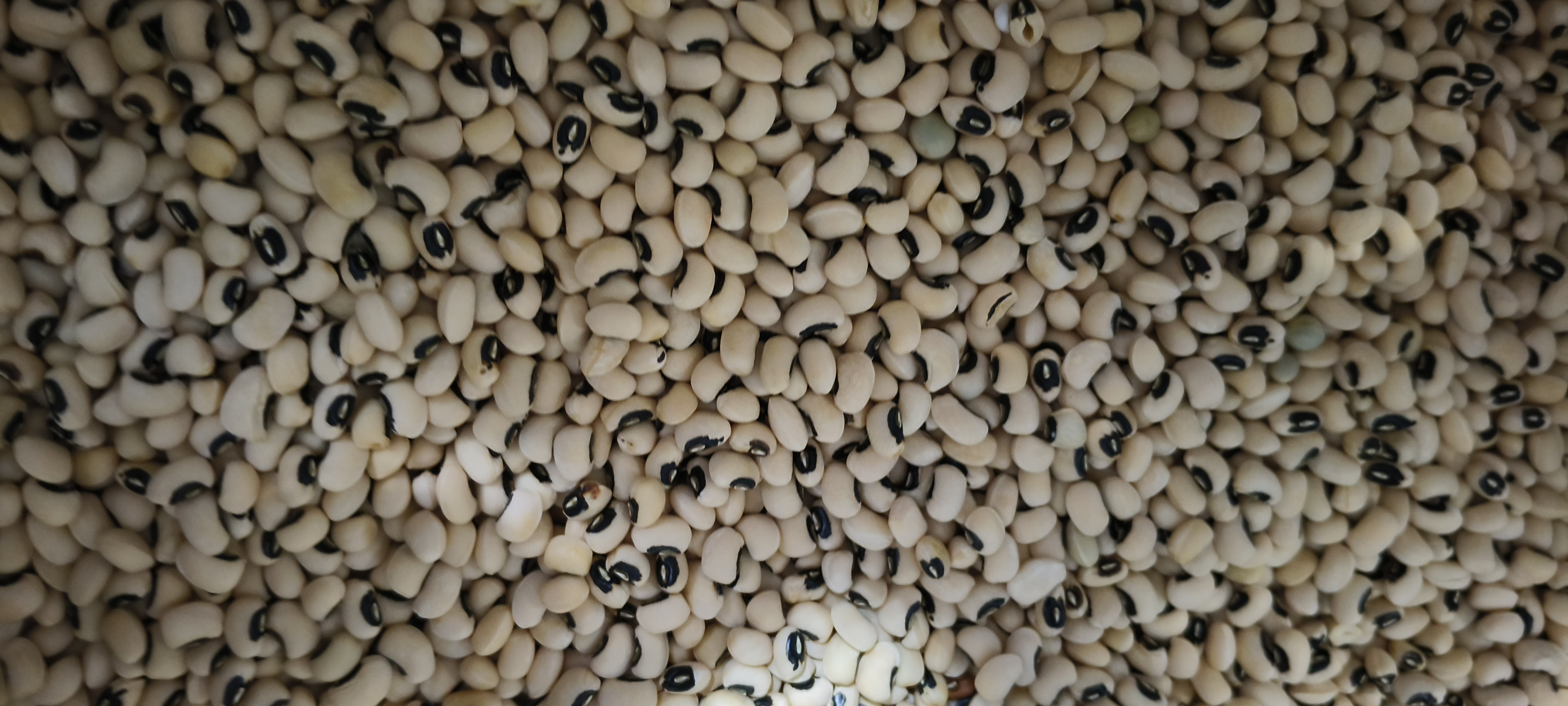
Black eyed peas food

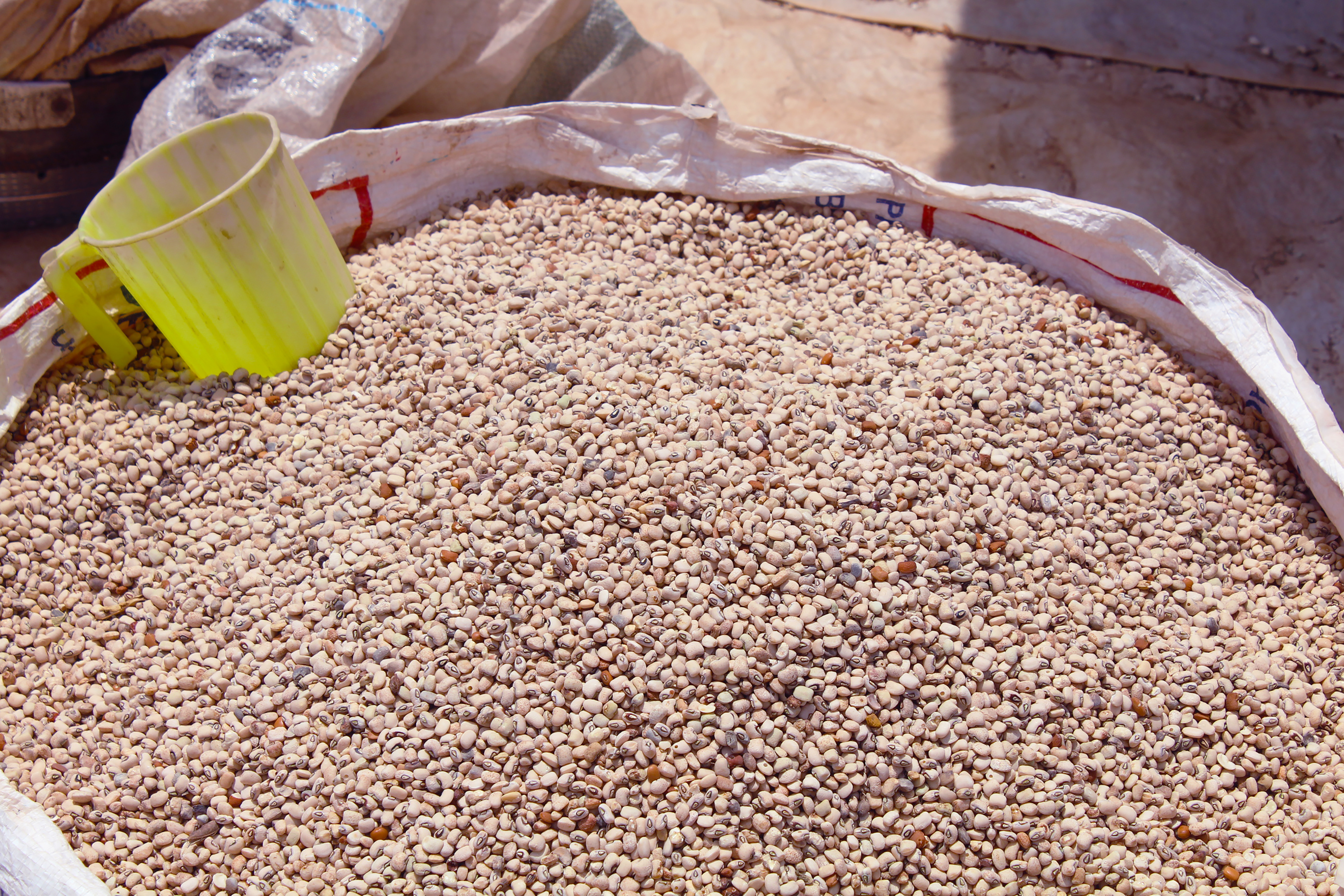
Cowpea on sale at the Monday Market in Kakuri, Kaduna
