= Chopped Canada =

Canadian reality cooking television series

- Genre: Cooking show
- Directed by: David Russell
- Presented by: Dean McDermott (season 1–2); Brad Smith (season 3–4)
- Country of origin: Canada
- Original language: English
- No. of seasons: 4
- No. of episodes: 98 (list of episodes)

Production
- Executive producers: David Paperny; Audrey Mehler; Cal Shumiatcher; Louise Wood; Trevor Hodgson
- Producer: Talent Producer Cliff Dempster
- Running time: 44 minutes
- Production company: Paperny Entertainment

Original release
- Network: Food Network Canada
- Release: January 2, 2014 – February 11, 2017

Chopped Canada is a Canadian reality cooking competition series that was broadcast by Food Network Canada from 2014 to 2017. It was a Canadian adaptation of the U.S. Chopped franchise. In May 2017, it was reported that the series had been cancelled by Food Network Canada after four seasons.

== Format ==
In each episode, four chefs go head to head and compete to create a delicious three course meal. The competition is divided into three rounds: "Appetizer", "Entrée", and "Dessert". In each round, the chefs are presented with a mystery basket containing four ingredients, and the challenge is to incorporate those mystery ingredients into an appetizing dish. The ingredients are generally diverse items which are not commonly prepared together.

The chef competitors are given access to a pantry and refrigerator stocked with a wide variety of other ingredients, which they are free to use as they wish. Each round is timed (twenty or thirty minutes for the Appetizer round, thirty minutes each for the Entrée and Dessert rounds), and the chefs must cook their dishes and complete four platings (three for the judges and one "beauty plate") before time runs out.

After each cooking round, there are three celebrity judges on hand to critique the dishes based on presentation, taste, and creativity. The chef with the worst dish is "chopped" from the competition. The host reveals the judges' decision by lifting a cloche on their table to show the losing chef's dish, and one of the judges comments on the reason for their decision. By the dessert round, only two chefs remain, and when deciding the winner, the judges deliberate not only on the dishes created by the two chefs during the final round, but also their overall performance throughout the competition. The winner is awarded a prize of $10,000, and the title of Chopped Canada Champion.

== Teen Tournament ==
The third season opened with a special Teen Tournament (the first tournament on the Chopped Canada series), which saw 16 chefs (aged 13 to 17) compete over the course of four semi-final episodes. The winner of each semi-final episode went on to compete in the Teen Tournament final, which awarded a $20,000 grand prize to the Chopped Canada Teen Champion.

== Host ==
The first two seasons of the show were hosted by Canadian actor Dean McDermott. However, in early March 2015, it was announced that he would not be returning as host for the upcoming third season.

In June 2015, Shaw Media announced that former Canadian Football player and The Bachelor Canada Brad Smith would take over as host, despite not having any culinary experience.

== Judges ==
The episodes feature a rotating panel of three celebrity judges. Past and current notable judges include celebrity chefs Massimo Capra, Lynn Crawford, Eden Grinshpan, John Higgins, Chuck Hughes, Susur Lee, Mark McEwan, Roger Mooking, Antonio Park, Michael Smith, Vikram Vij and Anne Yarymowich.

== Episode guide ==
Season	Episodes	Originally released	
Season	Episodes	First released	Last released
1	26	January 2, 2014	June 26, 2014
2	26	January 10, 2015	July 4, 2015
3	24	November 28, 2015	October 15, 2016
4	15	October 16, 2016	February 11, 2017

In March 2016, it was announced by Shaw Media that the show had been renewed for a fourth season, with Brad Smith returning as the host. The season featured special themed episodes, including Grandmothers, Firefighters, Celebrities and the first ever Judges' episode where four of the rotating judges stepped into the kitchen to compete for money for charity. The season also included additional Teen episodes with competitors aged 14 to 18, as well as the addition of Junior episodes, showcasing talented young chefs aged 9 to 13.
