= Christine Cushing =

Canadian celebrity chef

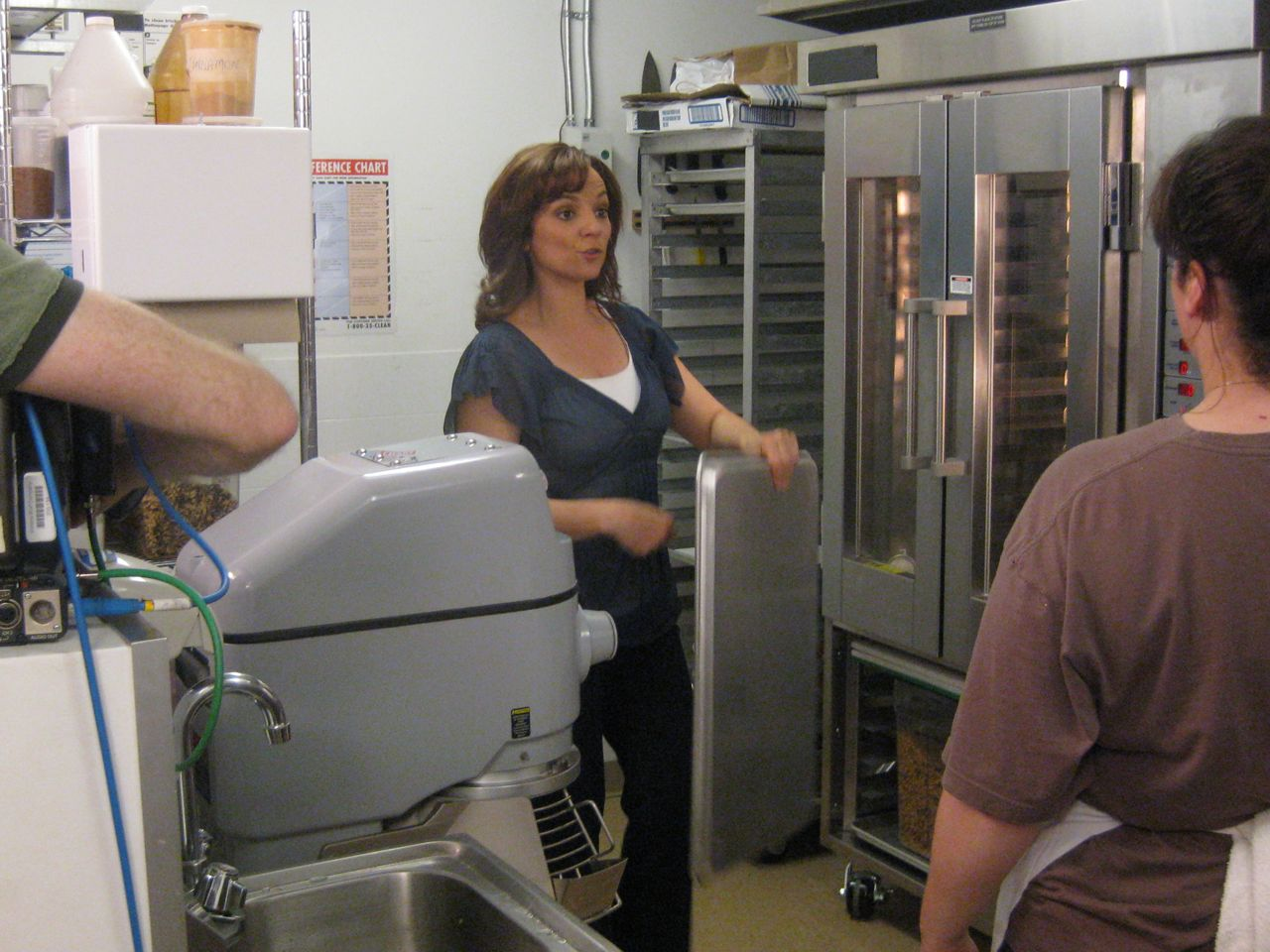
- Cushing in 2009
- Born: Athens, Greece
- Education: École de Cuisine La Varenne
- Culinary career
- Television shows: Dish It Out (1998–2001); Christine Cushing Live (2001–2005); Cook with Me (2005–2006); Fearless in the Kitchen
- Website: christinecushing.com

Christine Cushing is a Canadian celebrity chef and television program host. Her television debut took place in May 1998 when she was working at a small food company and a TV producer approached her, asking her to audition for one of his new shows. She hosted Christine Cushing Live and Dish It Out on Food Network Canada, and Fearless in the Kitchen on the Oprah Winfrey network in Canada.

She is the resident chef on CTV's The Marilyn Denis Show in Canada. Cushing has teamed up with food brand Furlani and demonstrated how to use their products in different recipes, such as Pulled Pork on Furlani Garlic Texas Toast.

== Biography ==
Born in Athens, Greece, Cushing moved to Canada with her family when she was one. Interested in cooking at a very young age, Cushing practiced cooking and baking as a child. She studied linguistics at the University of Toronto and graduated from the Food and Beverage Management program at George Brown College in 1986.

Cushing graduated top of her class in the Grand Diplôme program at the École de Cuisine La Varenne in Paris. She has worked at Four Seasons Hotels, Magna International, the King Ranch Health Spa, and Toronto's Scaramouche restaurant, as a pastry chef. She was a teacher at the Kitchen Studio, had her own cooking school, and created recipes for places such as Gusto magazine, Starbucks, and Ace Bakery. Cushing has also performed food demonstrations for KitchenAid Canada, Northern Telecom, and the Heart and Stroke Foundation. She has spoken at the Cook for the Cure breast cancer campaign, was thought to be a superhero at Starbright Foundation for sick kids hospital, and is now a judge for the Gold Medal Plate annual fundraiser for the Olympic committee as well as an advocate of the Children's Breakfast Clubs.

She has written three cookbooks and has a line of artisan food products: extra virgin olive oil from Greece, tomato sauces handmade in Canada, and roasted red pepper spreads.

== TV appearances ==
- 1998–2001: Dish It Out (Life Network, three seasons)
- 2001–2005: Christine Cushing Live (Food Network Canada, four seasons)
- 2005–2006: Cook with Me (Food Network Canada, one season)
- 2009–present: Fearless in the Kitchen (W and Viva Networks, Canada)
- 2017–present: Confucius Was a Foodie (NTD Canada/WNED-TV)
- 2020–present: Wall of Chefs (Food Network Canada, two seasons to date)
- 2022–present: Wall of Bakers (Food Network Canada, one season to date)

== Books ==
- Dish It Out: Simple Recipes That Inspire (2000)
- Fearless in the Kitchen: Innovative Recipes for the Uninhibited Cook (2002)
- Pure Food: How to Shop, Cook and Have Fun in Your Kitchen Every Day (2007)
