= Massimo Capra =

Italian celebrity chef

- Born: May 24, 1960 (age 66); Soresina, Italy
- Culinary career
- Cooking style: Italian
- Current restaurants
- Capra's Kitchen, Mississauga, Ontario (2017–present), Boccone Trattoria, Mississauga, Ontario (2013–present), Massimo’s Italian, Niagara Falls, Ontario (2018–present)
- Television shows
- Restaurant Makeover, Gourmet Escape, Chopped: Canada, Wall of Chefs, Cityline Resident Expert,

Massimo Capra (born 1960) is an Italian restaurateur, restaurant consultant, cookbook author, and celebrity chef. He is known for his appearances on the television shows CityTV's Cityline, Global's The Morning Show, and Food Network shows Restaurant Makeover, Chopped: Canada, Top Chef Canada, and Wall of Chefs. He is based in Mississauga, Ontario, near Toronto.

== Career ==
Massimo Capra was born in 1960, in Soresina, Lombardy, Italy. He was primarily raised in Cremona. While he was a teenager he left home from 1974 to 1977 to study cooking in Salsomaggiore in the province of Parma. Capra began his culinary career in Venice, working in a trattoria. He served in the Italian Army.

In 1982, Capra moved to Toronto. He started out working at Archer’s, a family-owned restaurant; followed by work at Prego Della Piazza, a celebrity destination.

In 2014, Capra started working on a new restaurant venue modeled after his successful Pearson Airport restaurant Boccone Pronto. Located inside Doha, Qatar's Hamad International Airport, the restaurant was dubbed Soprafino Restaurant. He also pursued several other ventures during this time.

He is currently the owner of Capra's Kitchen in Mississauga, Ontario, in partnership with Mohamad Fakih of Paramount Fine Foods.

== Publications ==
Capra had a monthly column in The Globe and Mail's "New Life" section. Several of his recipes have appeared in print, and was the food editor for Canadian Home Trend Magazine for several years.

His first full cookbook, One-Pot Italian (September 2007), was published by Allen & Unwin; followed by the award-winning cookbook Three Chefs: The Kitchen Men (2012).

Massimo Capra was the brand ambassador for Buitoni pizza, Samsung appliances, Silani cheese, and Kraft olive oil dressings. He currently raises awareness for Grana Padano, Prosciutto di Parma, and Prosciutto di San Daniele.

== Restaurants ==
=== Active ===
- Capra's Kitchen (2016–present), 1834 Lakeshore Road W, Mississauga, Ontario
- Massimo's Italian (2018–present), Sheraton on the Falls Hotel, Niagara Falls, Ontario
- Boccone Trattoria, formerly Boccone Pronto (2013–present), Toronto Pearson International Airport, Mississauga, Ontario

=== Closed ===
- Soprafino (2014–2021), Hamad International Airport, Doha, Qatar
- Mistura Restaurant (October 1997–September 2019), co-founded with Paolo Paolini, 256 Davenport Road, Toronto, Ontario
- Sopra Upper Lounge (c. 2011 – c. 2019), 256 Davenport Road, Toronto, Ontario

== Personal life ==
He is married to Rosa Capra and has raised two sons with her, Andrew (born in 1988) and Daniel (born in 1990).

In June 2018, three days before his 30th birthday, Capra's eldest son Andrew died in an undisclosed accident while living in Prague, Czech Republic.

Capra currently resides in the Lorne Park neighbourhood in Mississauga, Ontario.
