= Suzanne Barr =

American chef and author

Suzanne Barr is a Plantation, Florida based chef and author. She is also a restaurateur having owned two restaurants in Toronto, where she was born. Barr is CEO and founder of Suzanne Barr Food, Inc.

Barr was featured in the movie The Heat: A Kitchen (R)evolution and was a judge on Wall of Chefs.

In April 2022, her memoir My Ackee Tree: A Chef’s Memoir of Finding Home in the Kitchen was released.

True True Diner, one of her Toronto restaurants, closed in 2020. Her other restaurant was Saturday Dinette. Located in the Riverdale neighborhood, the diner closed in 2017 after 3 1/2 years following a dispute with their landlord.

== Personal life ==
Her family moved to Plantation Acres when she was four years old. Barr attended Nova Eisenhower Elementary and Nova Middle School in Davie and Nova High School, class of 1995. She continued her education in New York at the School of Visual Arts.

She is married to Johnnie Karagiannis.
