= UBC Faculty of Land and Food Systems =

Academic faculty at the University of British Columbia

The Faculty of Land and Food Systems (LFS) (formerly Faculty of Agricultural Sciences, formerly Faculty of Agriculture) is one of the three founding Faculties at the University of British Columbia (UBC) in Vancouver, British Columbia, Canada.

The faculty's administrative home is the H.R. MacMillan Building, with other programs housed across the UBC Point Grey campus, and the Lower Mainland of British Columbia.

The Food, Nutrition and Health Building on East Mall

Food science and nutrition programs are based in the Food, Nutrition and Health Building at 2205 East Mall, the former Family and Nutritional Sciences Building. Food science moved there after its previous building was cleared for student housing; the existing building was renovated and joined to a new annex designed by Maples Argo Architects, and the project achieved LEED Gold certification. New research laboratories in the renamed building opened in June 2006, supported by $690,000 from Western Economic Diversification Canada.

The faculty's academic and research programs focus on the relationships between land, food, and natural resource use, both at a local level, and within a global context. The faculty is also home to the Centre for Sustainable Food Systems at UBC Farm. Research by faculty and students covers a breadth of subjects, including soil, water and air use, food security, nutrition, food safety, food economics, agriculture, viticulture, animal welfare, food microbiology and aquaculture.

The faculty awards a Bachelor of Science (B.Sc.) for all undergraduate programs, and Master of Science (M.Sc.), Master of Food Science (MFS), Master of Food and Resource Economics (MFRE), and Doctorate (Ph.D.) at the graduate level.

== History ==
In 1914 Leonard Klinck, Professor of Cereal Husbandry at Macdonald College, McGill University, was appointed as UBC's first Dean of Agriculture. During UBC's first two sessions Dr. Klinck taught a general course in agriculture, which was open to 3rd and 4th year Arts students. In 1915 the university opened in temporary headquarters at the former McGill University College of British Columbia facilities adjacent to Vancouver General Hospital. There were three faculties; Arts and Science, Applied Science, and Agriculture. Total student enrolment was 379 and full- and part-time faculty totalled 34. The first students in Agriculture were enrolled in 1917/18. By then the Faculty of Agriculture consisted of four departments: Agronomy, Animal Husbandry, Horticulture and Poultry Husbandry.

In 1969, under Dean Michael Shaw, the Faculty of Agriculture became the Faculty of Agricultural Sciences, to reflect its strong emphasis on science in its teaching and research programs.

In 2005, under Dean Moura Quayle, the Faculty of Agricultural Sciences became the Faculty of Land and Food Systems, to better reflect its focus on sustainability and interdisciplinary research, including food and resource economics, food science, human nutrition, and animal, soil, and plant sciences.

== Undergraduate programs ==
- Applied Biology (formerly Agroecology)
  - Applied Animal Biology
  - Sustainable Agriculture and Environment
- Food, Nutrition and Health
  - Dietetics
  - Food Market Analysis
  - Food Science
  - Nutritional Sciences
  - Food and Nutritional Sciences
  - Food, Nutrition and Health
- Global Resource Systems

== Graduate programs ==
- Applied Animal Biology
- Food and Resource Economics (Professional)
- Food Science (both Professional and research-based programs)
- Human Nutrition
- Integrated Studies in Land and Food Systems
- Land and Water Systems (Professional)
- Plant Science
- Soil Science

== Research centres and groups ==
- Animal Welfare Program
- Biometeorology and Soil Science Group
- Centre for Sustainable Food Systems at UBC Farm
- Food and Resource Economics Group
- Food Science Research Group
- Human Nutrition Group
- Centre for Aquaculture & Environmental Research (CAER)
- Dairy Education & Research Centre
- Wine Research Centre
