= Nagabon =

Hybrid vegetable

Nagabon pepper
- Heat: Exceptionally hot
- Scoville scale: 750,000 - 800,000 SHU

The nagabon is a cross between a Scotch bonnet and a ghost pepper. Its heat is hotter than the hottest Scotch bonnet (750,000 SHU) and milder than the mildest naga (800,000 SHU).
