= The Heat: A Kitchen (R)evolution =

- Directed by: Maya Gallus
- Written by: Maya Gallus
- Produced by: Maya Gallus; Howard Fraiburg
- Starring: Anne-Sophie Pic; Angela Hartnett; Anita Lo; Ivy Knight; Victoria Blamey; Amanda Cohen; Suzanne Barr; Charlotte Langley
- Cinematography: John Minh Tran
- Edited by: Dave Kazala
- Music by: Keir Brownstone
- Production company: Red Queen Productions
- Distributed by: Gravitas Ventures
- Release date: April 26, 2018 (Hot Docs)
- Running time: 75 minutes
- Country: Canada
- Language: English

The Heat: A Kitchen (R)evolution is a Canadian documentary film, directed by Maya Gallus and released in 2018. The film profiles several women chefs, exploring the sexist double standards in the restaurant industry that get women sidelined, or stigmatized as "difficult", if they are as ambitious or assertive as their male peers.

Chefs appearing in the film are Anne-Sophie Pic, Angela Hartnett, Anita Lo, Ivy Knight, Victoria Blamey, Amanda Cohen, Suzanne Barr and Charlotte Langley.

The film premiered in April 2018 at the Hot Docs Canadian International Documentary Festival, and launched the prestigious Culinary Cinema programme at the 2019 Berlinale as well as other international film festival screenings before being broadcast by TVOntario.

The film was nominated for the Donald Brittain Award for Best Social or Political Documentary Program, and John Minh Tran was nominated for Best Photography in a Documentary Program or Factual Series, at the 7th Canadian Screen Awards.
