= Pai Northern Thai Kitchen =

Restaurant chain in Toronto, Canada

Pai Northern Thai Kitchen (simply Pai; stylized as PAI) is a restaurant chain in Toronto, Ontario, Canada serving northern Thai cuisine. Pai has two eat-in locations and three ghost kitchens. The chain is run by chefs Nuit Regular and Jeff Regular. Pai has been noted for its influence on Thai food in Toronto, and has been cited as one of the city's most liked spots for Thai food. Their menu focuses on authentic northern Thai cuisine with international influences; the most popular dish is their pad thai.

Nuit and Jeff had opened a number of Thai restaurants in Toronto before Pai. The first Pai location was opened in 2014 in Downtown Toronto. Following the opening, the Toronto Star left a positive review while The Globe and Mail left a mixed one. Pai opened a ghost kitchen with Kitchen Hub in early 2020 and an eat-in location in late 2020, situated in Yonge–Eglinton. They began operating a further two ghost kitchens in 2022.

== History ==
In the mid-2000s, there was a lack of "authentic" Thai food in Toronto. Jeff Regular and Thai-born Nuit Regular set out to fill this gap, and opened Sukhothai in 2008. The chefs continued to open Thai restaurants in Toronto, including Sabai Sabai Kitchen and Bar and Khao San Road. According to Eater Toronto, Khao San Road "may have single-handedly relaunched Thai cuisine into the trend-sphere of the city."

Nuit and Jeff opened Pai's first location in 18 Duncan St. (in Downtown Toronto). The grand opening occurred on July 5, 2014, although it was open since May 30. The restaurant was named after Pai, Thailand. Pai is also run by Gusto 54, owned by restaurateur Janet Zuccarini. In 2017, Nuit said they served 1,500 customers on a given busy day. In early 2020, Pai opened their first ghost kitchen—a restaurant which only provides takeout and delivery—to satisfy their high demand for takeout and delivery. Pai's first ghost kitchen is located within Kitchen Hub Etobicoke: a "virtual food hall" that hosts multiple ghost kitchens in the same location. Pai's second eat-in location, PAI Uptown, was opened in late 2020 at 2335 Yonge St. (in the Yonge–Eglinton neighbourhood). Jeff stated the restaurant shares similarities with the downtown location, but with "its own quirky personality". In 2022, Pai opened two more ghost kitchens at Kitchen Hub locations: Kitchen Hub Castlefield in March and Kitchen Hub Liberty Village in September.

=== Locations ===
Locations of Pai Northern Thai Kitchen. Kitchen Hub Locations denoted in Blue

Locations of Pai Northern Thai Kitchen
Address	Neighbourhood	Coordinates	Year opened	Notes
18 Duncan St.	Downtown Toronto	43.6478°N 79.3886°W	2014	—N/a
935 The Queensway	The Queensway–Humber Bay	43.6237°N 79.5123°W	2020	Ghost kitchen with takeout and delivery only. Part of Kitchen Hub Etobicoke.
2335 Yonge St.	Yonge–Eglinton	43.7085°N 79.3985°W	2020	—N/a
1121 Castlefield Av.	Yorkdale-Glen Park	43.7002°N 79.4535°W	2022	Ghost kitchen with takeout and delivery only. Part of Kitchen Hub Castlefield.
1108 King St. W	Liberty Village	43.6399°N 79.4231°W	2022	Ghost kitchen with takeout and delivery only. Part of Kitchen Hub Liberty Village.
All locations in Toronto, Ontario, Canada

== Menu ==
Pai intends to combine traditional Thai cooking with international influences and overall focuses on northern Thai cuisine. According to Jeff, Pai focuses more on northern Thai cuisine than their other restaurants. Michelin Guide described Pai's menu as "extensive," with "fresh, tasty dishes and vibrant curries". As of 2021, Pai's most popular dish is their pad thai; other popular dishes include their khao soi and pad gra prow. According to Nuit, she "really helped popularize and put on the food map" these aforementioned dishes in Toronto.

== Reception ==
Food critic reviews
Review scores
Source	Rating
Amy Pataki, 2014 (Toronto Star)	3.5/4 stars
Chris Nuttall-Smith, 2014 (The Globe and Mail)	0/4 stars

Amy Pataki of the Toronto Star reviewed the restaurant in 2014 and gave it three-and-a-half out of four stars. According to Pataki, at Pai, "fun is as much the guiding principle as the excellent Thai food". Pataki praised the hunglay curry, tom yum goong, papaya salad, and fried morning glory.

Chris Nuttall-Smith of The Globe and Mail reviewed the restaurant in 2014 and discussed authenticity in Toronto's Thai food. While Nuttall-Smith said that Pai's Thai food is some of Toronto's best, they criticized it for its sweetness and lack of bitterness for being northern Thai. Nuttall-Smith gave the restaurant no stars (not recommended) and concluded "for Toronto, Pai is very, very good. But I dream of a day when a Thai restaurant in the city is worthy of praise without that 'for Toronto' bit."

According to Filipe Dimas of blogTO, Pai is one of "Toronto's favourite Thai restaurants"; similarly, Kayla Gladysz of Daily Hive called it "one of the city’s top spots for Thai cuisine". Megan Ogilvie of the Toronto Star wrote that the restaurant is "credited with revitalizing Toronto’s Thai dining scene". According to Donna Paris of the Toronto Star, Nuit "has changed the way people think about Thai food" in Toronto. Notable patrons have included Jason Momoa, The Umbrella Academy cast, James Harden, and J. Cole.
