= Anita Lo =

American chef and restaurateur

Anito Lo
- Education: Concord Academy; Columbia University (BA)
- Culinary career
- Previous restaurant
- Annisa, New York City
- Television shows
- Iron Chef America (chef); Top Chef Masters (chef)

Anita Lo is an American chef and restaurateur. In 2001, she was named by Food & Wine magazine one of ten "Best New Chefs in America".

== Biography ==
=== Early life ===
Anita Lo, a first-generation Chinese-Malaysian American, grew up in Birmingham, Michigan.

She graduated from Concord Academy and then from Columbia University, where she earned a degree in French literature. While a student at the culinary school L’Ecole Ritz-Escoffier, she interned with top French chefs Guy Savoy and Michel Rostang.

Lo is a lesbian.

=== Career ===
After completing culinary school in Paris, Lo returned to New York where she worked at several restaurants including Chanterelle, Can, a French-Vietnamese restaurant, and Maxim's. She then moved to Mirezi restaurant, where she earned headlines and rave reviews from restaurant critics, including Ruth Reichl from The New York Times.

In 2000, Anita Lo and her business partner Jennifer Scism opened Annisa in New York's Greenwich Village. Annisa received a two-star review from The New York Times, Lo was named to Food & Wine magazine's list of the ten “Best New Chefs in America”, and The Village Voice named her the “Best New Restaurant Chef.” In 2006, Annisa was awarded a Michelin star in the first Michelin Guide for New York City.

In 2005, Anita Lo co-founded Rickshaw, a dumpling bar with several locations in New York City. She left Rickshaw in 2010, saying that she wanted to devote more time to the recently re-opened Annisa and to her other professional interests. In 2008, she opened Bar Q, a barbecue-Asian fusion restaurant in Greenwich Village. Bar Q received favorable food reviews but somewhat critical reviews for service and was not universally well received by residents in the neighborhood. It closed after ten months.

On July 4, 2009, Annisa was destroyed by fire. The restaurant reopened in April 2010 at the same location. The reopened restaurant was reviewed again by The New York Times and again received two stars. Scism also left Annisa in June 2010, leaving Lo as the sole owner. In 2011, the Greenwich Village Society for Historic Preservation recognized the restaurant's excellence with a Village Award. Annisa received three stars from The New York Times in 2014.

In 2015, Anita Lo was the first female guest chef to cook for a State dinner at the White House. She prepared a 4-course meal for the state visiting Chinese leader, Xi Jinping and his wife Peng Liyuan. In May 2017, after 17 years of business, she closed the Annisa on financial grounds, blaming the continuous increase of real estate taxes and of minimum wages.

== Television appearances ==
- 2005: Appearance on the first season of Iron Chef America. She competed against Iron Chef Mario Batali in Battle Mushrooms, defeating Batali by a score of 54-45. She was the first challenger to win a battle on Iron Chef America and remained the only female challenger to win until Traci Des Jardins defeated Batali in Episode 5 of Season 2.
- 2009: Contestant on the first season of Top Chef Masters. She finished in fourth place among the 24 competing chefs, earning $20,000 for her chosen charity, SHARE.
- 2011: Contestant on Chopped: All-Stars Tournament. She lost to Nate Appleman.
- In 2018 she was profiled in Maya Gallus's documentary film The Heat: A Kitchen (R)evolution.

== Works ==
- Solo: A Modern Cookbook for a Party of One, Knopf, 2018 ISBN 978-0451493606

== See also ==
- History of the Chinese Americans in Metro Detroit
