= Nuit Regular =

Chef

Nonglak "Nuit" Regular (Thai: นงลักษณ์ "นุ้ย" เรกรูล่า) is a Thai chef and co-owner of nine restaurants in Toronto. She was named one of “The 20 Most Influential Female Chefs and Restaurateurs Right Now.”

== Biography ==
She grew up in Pai, Thailand. Regular did not like cooking when she was young, but was expected to help out in the kitchen. She met her husband, Jeff Regular, when he was traveling in Thailand. At the time, she was a nurse. Together she and Regular opened a restaurant called the Curry Shack where she would cook at night after her nursing job. Eventually she enjoyed cooking more than nursing.

In 2006, the couple moved to Toronto where she studied English and for nursing license. Jeff's father approached her about opening a restaurant in a building he owned. That resulted in the restaurant SukhoThai.

== Career ==
Regular is the executive chef and co-owner of Pai Northern Thai Kitchen (two locations and several take out locations), Kiin, Selva, Chaiyo and SukhoThai (four locations). She was also the founder, executive chef and co-owner of Khao San Road until 2014, and Sabai Sabai until its closure in 2022. She has been a judge on Wall of Chefs, a Food Network Canada show.

In 2020, Regular published her first cookbook, Kiin with Penguin Random House. The book features recipes and essays that focus on northern Thai cooking, and was awarded the 2021 IACP Cookbook Award for International Cookbooks.

== Awards and honors ==
On the basis of the authenticity of the food at three of her restaurants, the Thai government awarded her the Thai Select Signature.
