= Adrian Forte =

Jamaican-Canadian celebrity chef

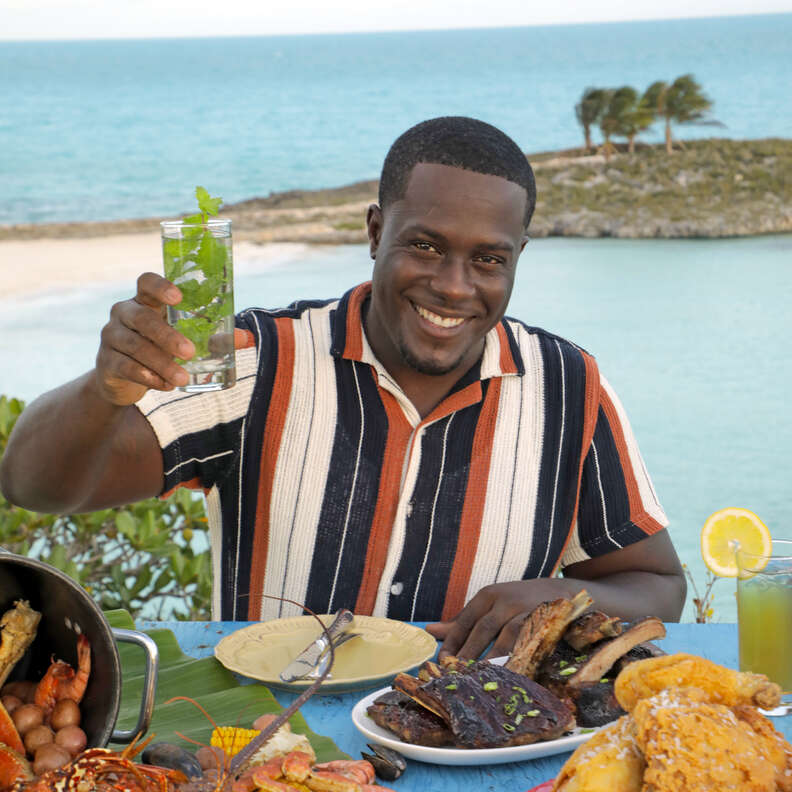
- Forte in Turks and Caicos
- Born: Adrian Paul Barrington Forte; Kingston, Jamaica
- Occupations: Chef, author, restaurateur, television personality
- Years active: 2009–present
- Known for: Contemporary Caribbean cuisine
- Website: adrianforte.com

Adrian Forte is a Jamaican-Canadian celebrity chef and author based in Los Angeles, California. He was a semi-finalist on Food Network Canada's Top Chef Canada, a judge on Chef in Your Ear, and a contestant on Chopped Canada. He was also featured on Netflix's Restaurants on The Edge as the culinary expert on Caribbean cuisine.

== Early life ==
Forte was born in Kingston, Jamaica. He moved to New York City in 2003 to live with his grandmother, where he attended high school and played football. He was introduced to the culinary arts by his grandmother who was a former chef in their native country of Jamaica. After her untimely passing, he then moved to Ontario, Canada.

== Career ==
Forte studied culinary arts at George Brown College in Toronto. Upon graduating, he pursued entrepreneurship and became the executive chef at Gangster Burger and Rock Lobster, one of the co-founders of Dirty Bird Chicken & Waffles and founder of AF1 Caribbean. He has also worked internationally as a private chef and culinary consultant.

In August 2020, he appeared as a guest chef at Café Boulud at the Four Seasons Hotel, where he showcased signature dishes later included in his cookbook Yawd.

From 2021 to 2024, Forte was based in Turks and Caicos, where he served as the in-house private chef and culinary director at Emara Estate—formerly owned by Prince—and provided culinary services for high-profile clientele.

In early 2025, Forte was named executive chef of Lucia, the first fine dining modern Afro-Caribbean restaurant in Los Angeles. The restaurant received widespread media coverage for its contemporary culinary application of Caribbean traditions.

== Publications ==
- Yawd: Modern Afro-Caribbean Recipes. Penguin Random House Canada, 2022. ISBN 9780735241173.
