= The Heat with Mark McEwan =

Canadian television series

- Starring: Mark McEwan
- Country of origin: Canada

Production
- Running time: 30 minutes

Original release
- Network: Food Network Canada

The Heat with Mark McEwan is a Canadian food and catering show produced by General Purpose Pictures which airs on Food Network in Canada. It is hosted by Mark McEwan, a Celebrity chef based in Toronto. In the show, Mark heads a team of skilled chefs and caterers pulled from his restaurants 'North 44', 'Bymark' and 'ONE' as he caters various upscale Canadian events.

== Show format ==
Mark acts as the driving narrative for each episode. Catering large-scale events with staff at varying skill levels and competency results in entertaining theatrics as Mark coaches and directs his team.

== Integrated Marketing ==
In June 2009 Mark opened 'McEwan' a high end grocery store located at the 'Shops at Don Mills' in Toronto. Season 3 of The Heat largely tells the story of the opening of the store and the many problems that McEwan faced in its construction.

To coincide with the launch of his first grocery store Mark also launched his own branded line of cookware and utensils.
