= Prego Della Piazza =

Former restaurant in Toronto, Canada

Coordinates: 43.6692°N 79.3936°W

Prego Della Piaza
- Interactive map of Prego Della Piaza

Restaurant information
- Established: 1987; 39 years ago
- Closed: March 31, 2010; 16 years ago
- Previous owner: Michael Carlevale
- Manager: Faro Chiniforoush
- Head chef: Michael Carlevale (1987–2007); Faro Chiniforoush (2007–2010)
- Food type: Italian
- Location: 150 Bloor St. W., Toronto, Ontario, M5S 2X9, Canada
- Website: Last snapshot of official website at the Wayback Machine (archived 2010-03-09)

Prego Della Piazza was a fine dining restaurant which was one of the oldest in Toronto. Following financial difficulties, it closed down on March 31, 2010.

== History ==
Prego Della Piazza was opened in 1987 by Michael Carlevale, an Italian chef from Boston. After the closure of Bemelmans in 1994, Prego increased in popularity, as its discreetness attracted celebrities.

However Carlevale had made bad investments in other restaurants and the subsequent financial difficulties bankrupted him. Following a slump in business caused by nearby construction, the company that managed the plaza where Prego Della Piazza was located chose not to extend the restaurant's lease in early 2010.
