= Vij's =

Indian restaurant in Vancouver, British Columbia, Canada

- Interactive map of Vij's

Restaurant information
- Established: September 1, 1994
- Owner: Vikram Vij
- Food type: Indian
- Location: 3106 Cambie Street, Vancouver, British Columbia, Canada
- Coordinates: 49.2576°N 123.1148°W

Vij's is a restaurant in Vancouver, British Columbia, Canada. It serves Indian cuisine.

The restaurant opened in the 1990s. It has received Bib Gourmand status from the Michelin Guide, first being awarded in 2022 and retaining this designation in 2023 and 2024.

== Recognition ==
=== Canada's 100 Best Restaurants Ranking ===
Vij's
| Year | Rank | Change |
| 2015 | 29 | new |
| 2016 | 27 | ▲2 |
| 2017 | 26 | ▲1 |
| 2018 | 50 | ▼24 |
| 2019 | ▼ No Rank | |
| 2020 | ▼ No Rank | |
| 2021 | No List | |
| 2022 | ▼ No Rank | |
| 20233 | ▼ No Rank | |
| 2024 | ▼ No Rank | |
| 2025 | ▼ No Rank | |
| 2026 | ▼ No Rank | |

== See also ==
- List of Indian restaurants
- List of Michelin Bib Gourmand restaurants in Canada
- List of restaurants in Vancouver
