= UBC Farm =

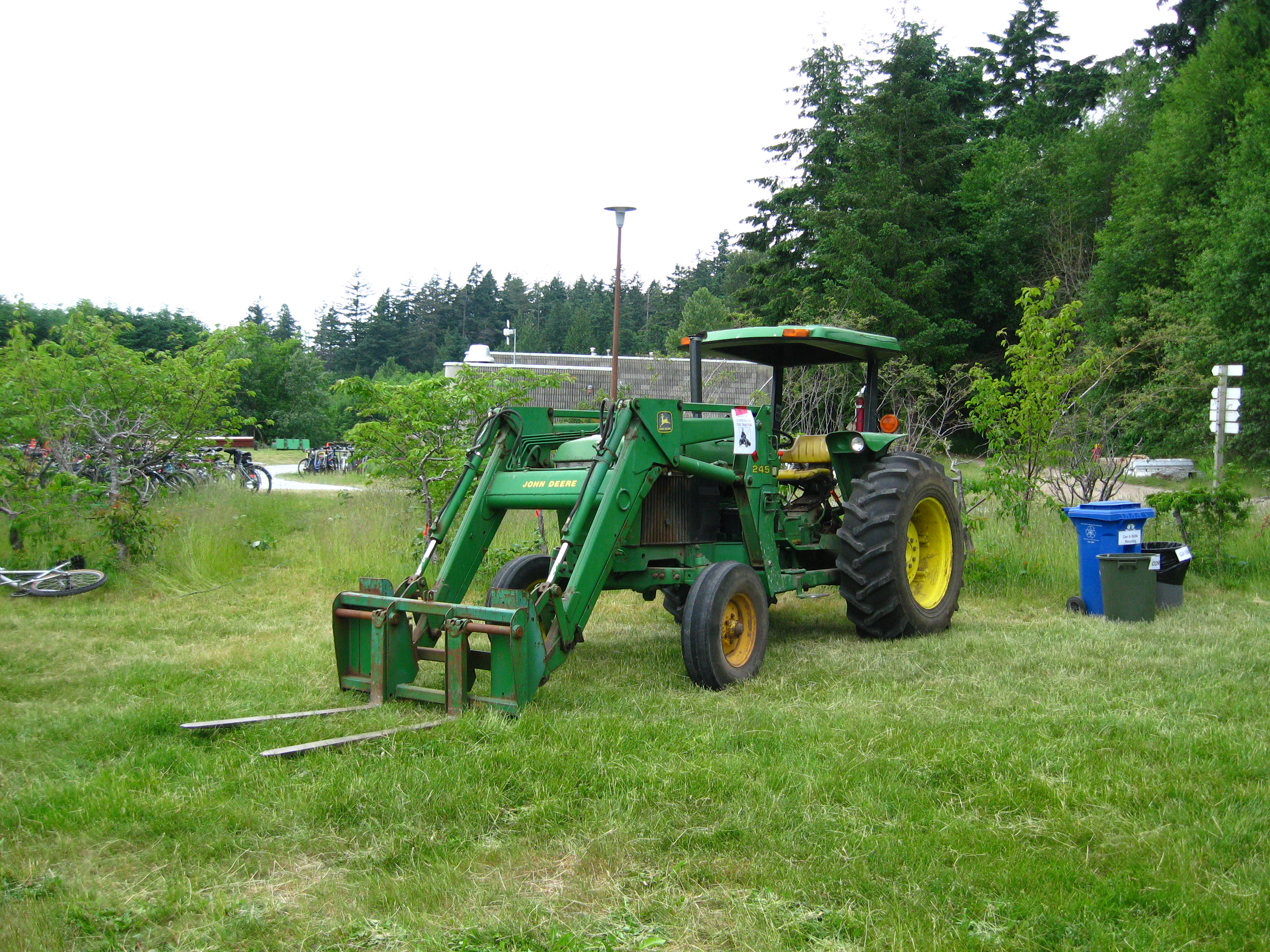
- Interactive map of the UBC Farm area

General information
- Type: Farm and forest system
- Location: 3461 Ross Drive; University Endowment Lands, Vancouver, BC, Canada
- Coordinates: 49°15′03″N 123°14′20″W
- Construction started: 1915
- Renovated: 2000
- Owner: Centre for Sustainable Food Systems, part of UBC Faculty of Land and Food Systems

Technical details
- Grounds: 20 hectares

Website
- ubcfarm.ubc.ca

The UBC Farm is a 24-hectare farm and forest system on the southern end of the University of British Columbia (UBC) campus in Vancouver, British Columbia, Canada. The farm is operated by the Centre for Sustainable Food Systems, which is part of the Faculty of Land and Food Systems, and has existed in its current form since 2000. It hosts a variety of crops and fruits, as well as some animals and composting facilities. Several academic programs allow the students to use the farm for research and teaching. The UBC Farm shares the land with the Tal A'xin: Mayan in Exile Garden, the Musqueam Garden, and the xʷc̓ic̓əsəm Garden.

== History ==
The farm, located on traditional Musqueam First Nations territory, has been a part of UBC since 1915. However, the farm of 1915 was not located at its current location but reached from the Nitobe Memorial Garden to the Thunderbird Stadium. In 1970, the farm moved closer to its current location at Wesbrook Place. During the 1990s, activity in the agricultural area at the south end of campus declined, and in 1997 the area was declared a Future Housing Reserve. A student-initiated program, supported by the Faculties of Science and Forestry, began in 1999 to advocate for the revival of the UBC Farm. During 2008 there was an announcement of plans to reduce the size of the farm or move it somewhere else. This caused the Alma Mater Society club Friends of the UBC Farm to start the "Save the Farm" campaign and advocate for the conservation of the farm. This campaign caused a shift in policy, and on December 1, 2009, UBC's Board of Governors stated that the site of the UBC Farm would no longer be considered a housing reserve. In 2011, the area was declared a "Green Academic" zone, which "will be kept primarily as open areas to support land-based teaching, research, and community engagement".

== Farm facilities and mission ==
=== Farm facilities ===
The farm consists of two small buildings, which can serve a variety of purposes, including as classroom, office, kitchen, storage, and processing areas, and it is surrounded by a coastal hemlock forest. Two tractors and other tools are stored in several sheds on site, and two glass greenhouses and three polytunnels offer to extend the seasons and further spread the crops. A 300 m^{3} composting facility can process the farm's and other local produce wholesalers' organic waste and turn it into soil fertilizer. Two trailers offer staff accommodation to take care of the animals 24 hours a day. The farm includes a wide range of crops and livestock, which represent the agricultural possibilities of the Pacific Northwest. Vancouver's moderate maritime climate allows cultivation of certain crops year round. Over 70 different kind of apples grow in the heritage orchard, and the farm also features grapes, blueberries, raspberries, hops, and truffles. The farm normally hosts some free-range poultry and honeybee colonies, and has occasionally been a seasonal home for cattle. It provides a habitat for "a range of birds, mammals, amphibians, and reptiles not found elsewhere in the city".
