= Scotch bonnet =

Variety of chili pepper

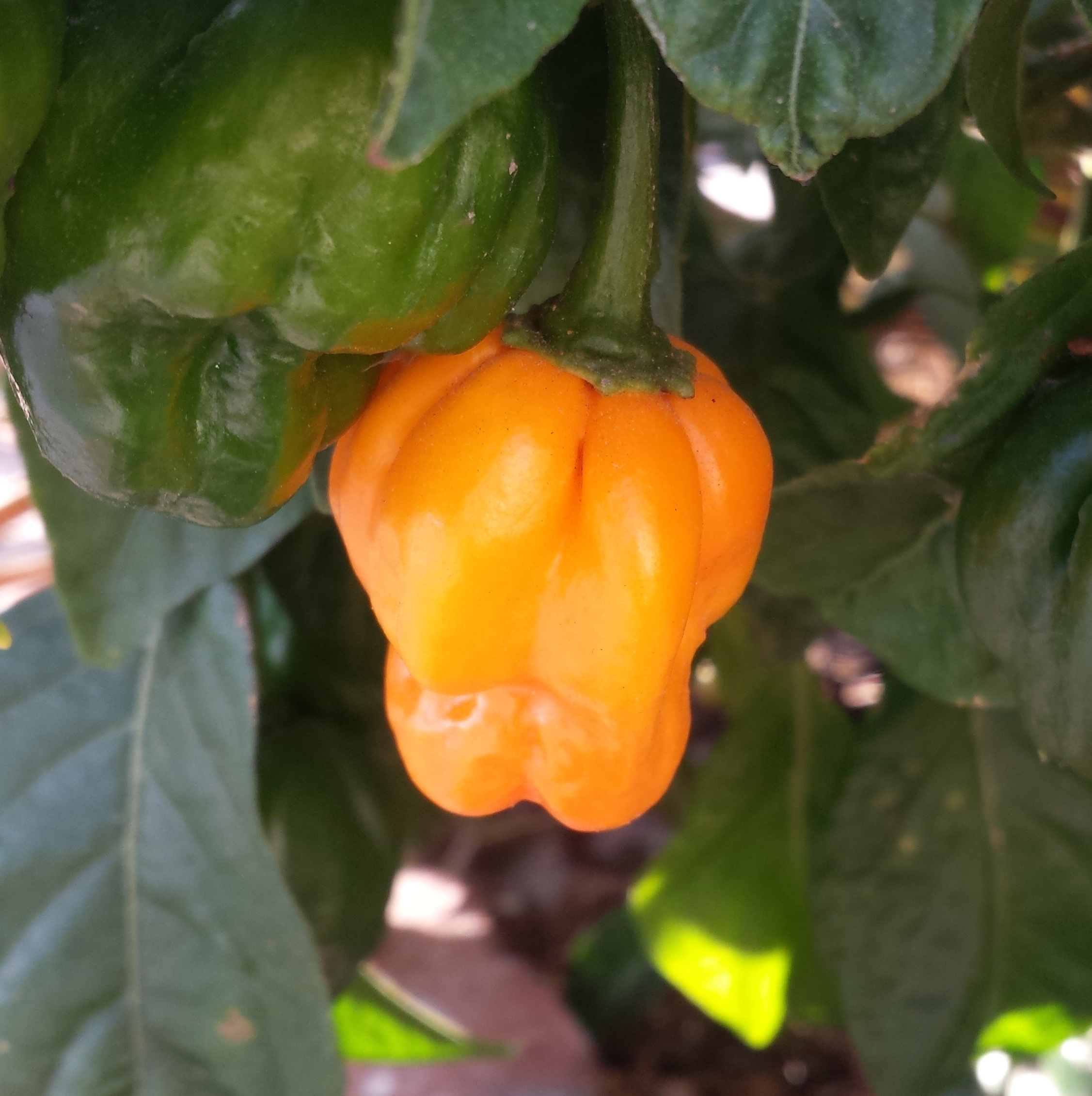
- Species: Capsicum chinense
- Cultivar: 'Scotch Bonnet'
- Heat: Very hot
- Scoville scale: 100,000-350,000 SHU

Scotch bonnet (also known as Bonney peppers, Caribbean red peppers or Panamanian pepper in Central America) is a variety of chili pepper named for its supposed resemblance to a Scottish tam o' shanter bonnet. It is native to the Americas—a cultivar of Capsicum chinense, which originated in the Amazon Basin, Central and South America.

== Description ==
As a cultivar of Capsicum chinense, the Scotch bonnet shows that species' distinguishing traits: its flowers and fruit are often borne two or more to a node, in contrast to Capsicum annuum peppers, which usually bear a single flower per node, and the fruit's calyx has a distinct annular constriction where it joins the stalk. These characters are not wholly reliable on their own, as the species can be difficult to tell apart at the flowering or fruiting stage.

Because young plants of different pepper varieties can look alike, Scotch bonnet seed and seedlings are sometimes mislabeled, and a grower may not discover the mistake until the plant fruits. A widely shared 2026 case involved home-garden peppers, sold under other labels, that were believed to be Scotch bonnets, and a 2023 wave of pepper-seed mix-ups in home-gardening communities was nicknamed "Peppergate".

== Varieties ==
Scotch bonnets are grown in several colour forms. The most common ripen yellow to orange or red; a chocolate-brown form, usually described as slightly hotter and more earthy, is also grown. In Jamaica, a strain promoted by the country's Ministry of Agriculture and marketed as "MoA" is widely cultivated.

== History ==
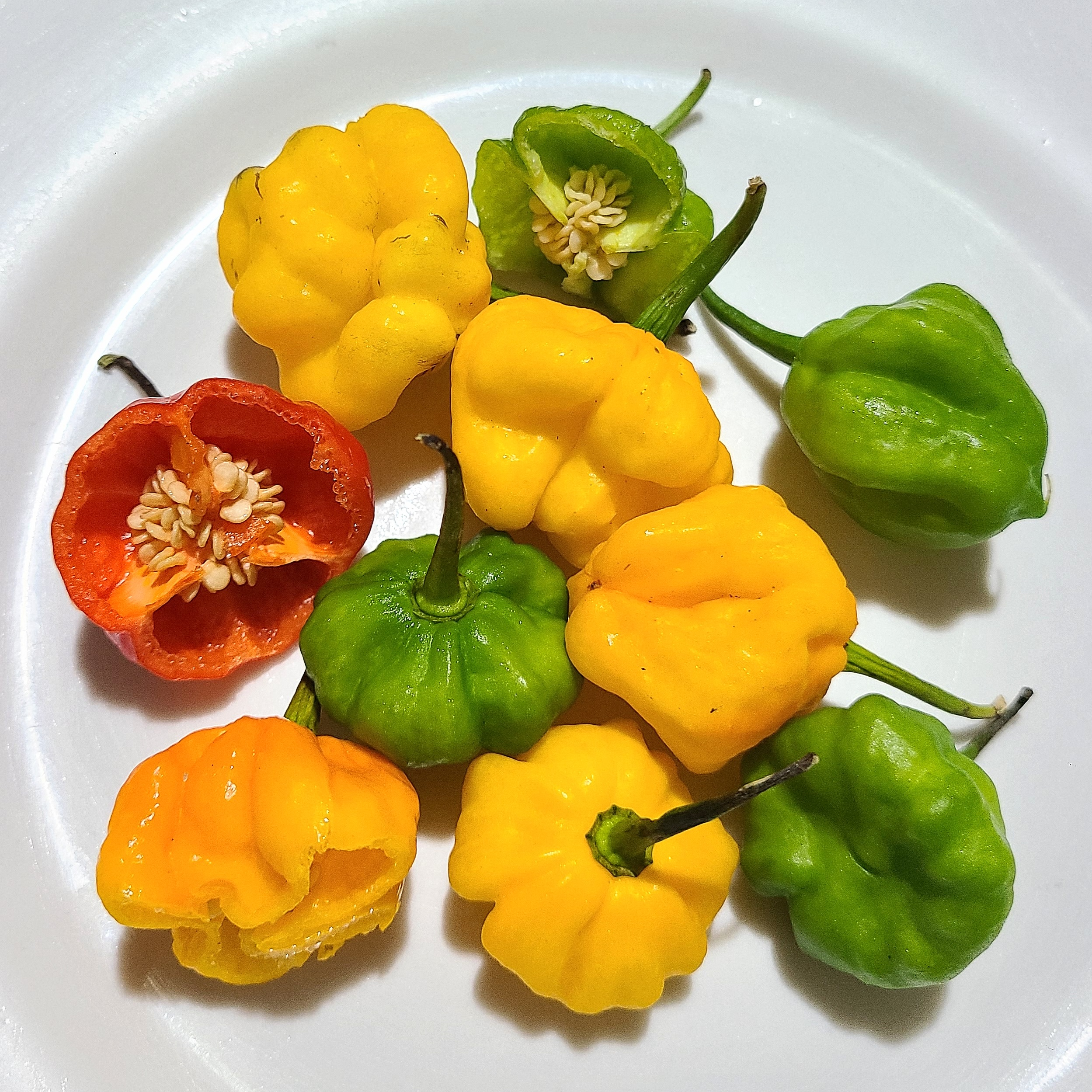
Jamaican scotch bonnets— cultivar of Capsicum chinense.

Indigenous peoples like the Amerindians of the Antilles, the Tainos, and later the Caribs, transported scotch bonnet peppers and other staples like cassava and sweet potato across the Caribbean on huge canoes. Both of these Arawakan subgroups originated in the Orinoco River Valley, in present-day Venezuela. The Tainos from the Yucatán Peninsula and Belize were pioneers in traveling to the Greater Antilles, and they took a variety of chilies with them. They have since become a staple of Caribbean cuisine, especially Jamaican.

In the 15th and 16th centuries, Spanish and Portuguese colonizers introduced scotch bonnets and other chili peppers to other regions. Through the Columbian exchange, the five domesticated species of Capsicum were introduced into Europe, Africa, and Asia, where more varieties developed across the globe. They became so popular in Asia and Africa, that many consumers there are unaware of the chili peppers' Mesoamerican origins.

Like the closely related habanero, scotch bonnets have a heat rating of 100,000–350,000 Scoville units. For comparison, most jalapeño peppers have a heat rating of 2,500 to 8,000. A completely sweet variety of scotch bonnet, cachucha, is grown on some Caribbean islands.

== Cuisine ==
Scotch bonnets are used in many cuisines worldwide for hot sauces and condiments. They are compared to habaneros, since both are cultivars of the same species, with the same level of heat and pungency. However, scotch bonnets have a sweeter flavour profile, often described as fruity or citrus-like, and a stouter shape.

Scotch bonnets are mostly used in Caribbean, West African, Sri Lankan, and Maldivian cuisines and pepper sauces. In Jamaica, scotch bonnets are key ingredients in various Jamaican dishes, such as jerk, which is also of Taino origin and indigenous to the island. They are commonly blended into jerk marinades, pepper sauces, soups, stews, and curries. Some Jamaican dishes that use scotch bonnets include jerk chicken, curry goat, escovitch fish, peppered shrimp, and rice and peas.

In Latin American cuisine, it may be used as a substitute for similar peppers, like habaneros. Scotch bonnets are used in coastal Nicaragua, Costa Rica, Honduras, Panama and San Andrés for Caribbean-styled recipes adopted from Jamaica, such as rice and peas, rondón, and beef patties— as well as, other dishes like sous and ceviche.

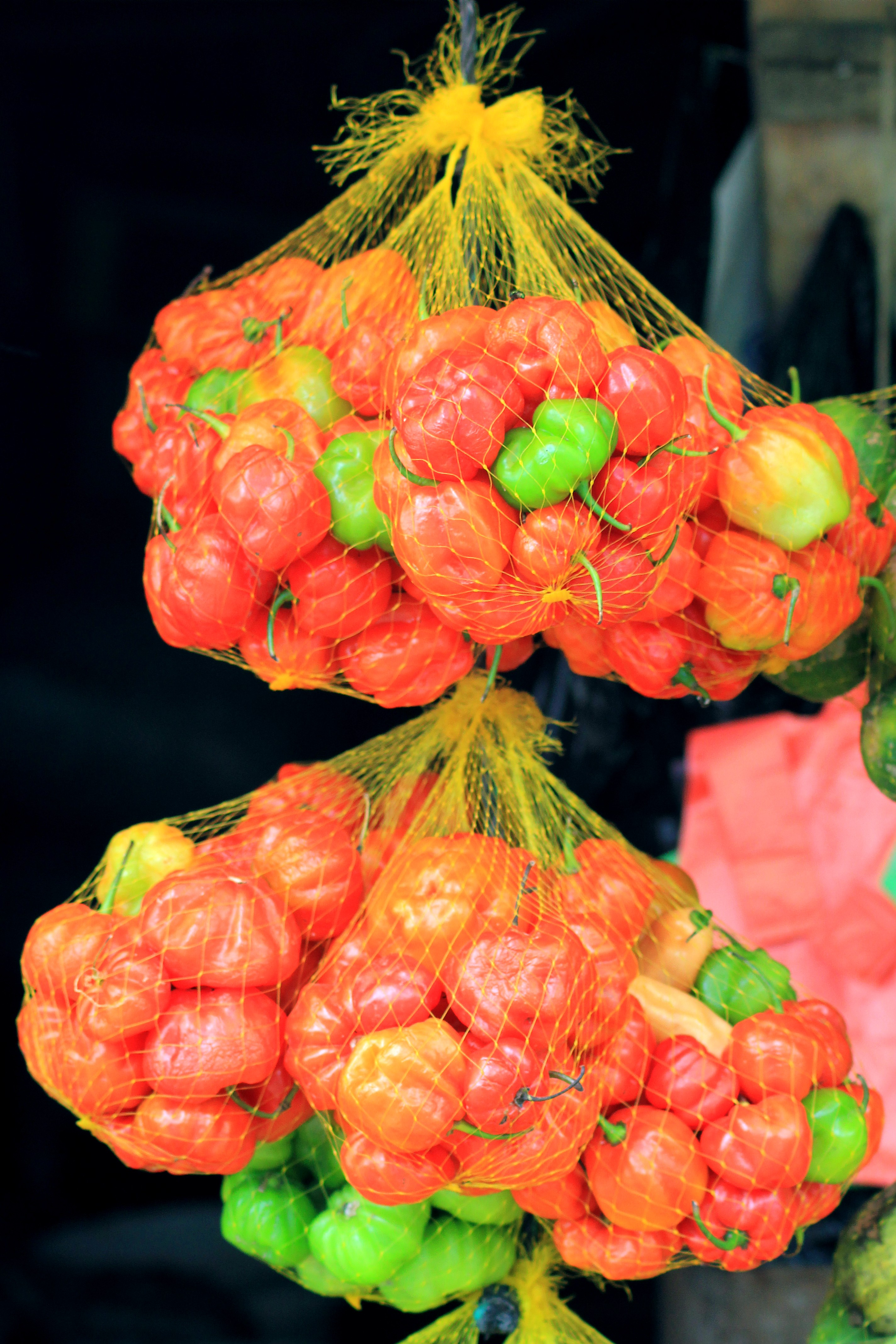
Scotch bonnet peppers in a Brazilian market, in Tabatinga— a town along the Amazon River.

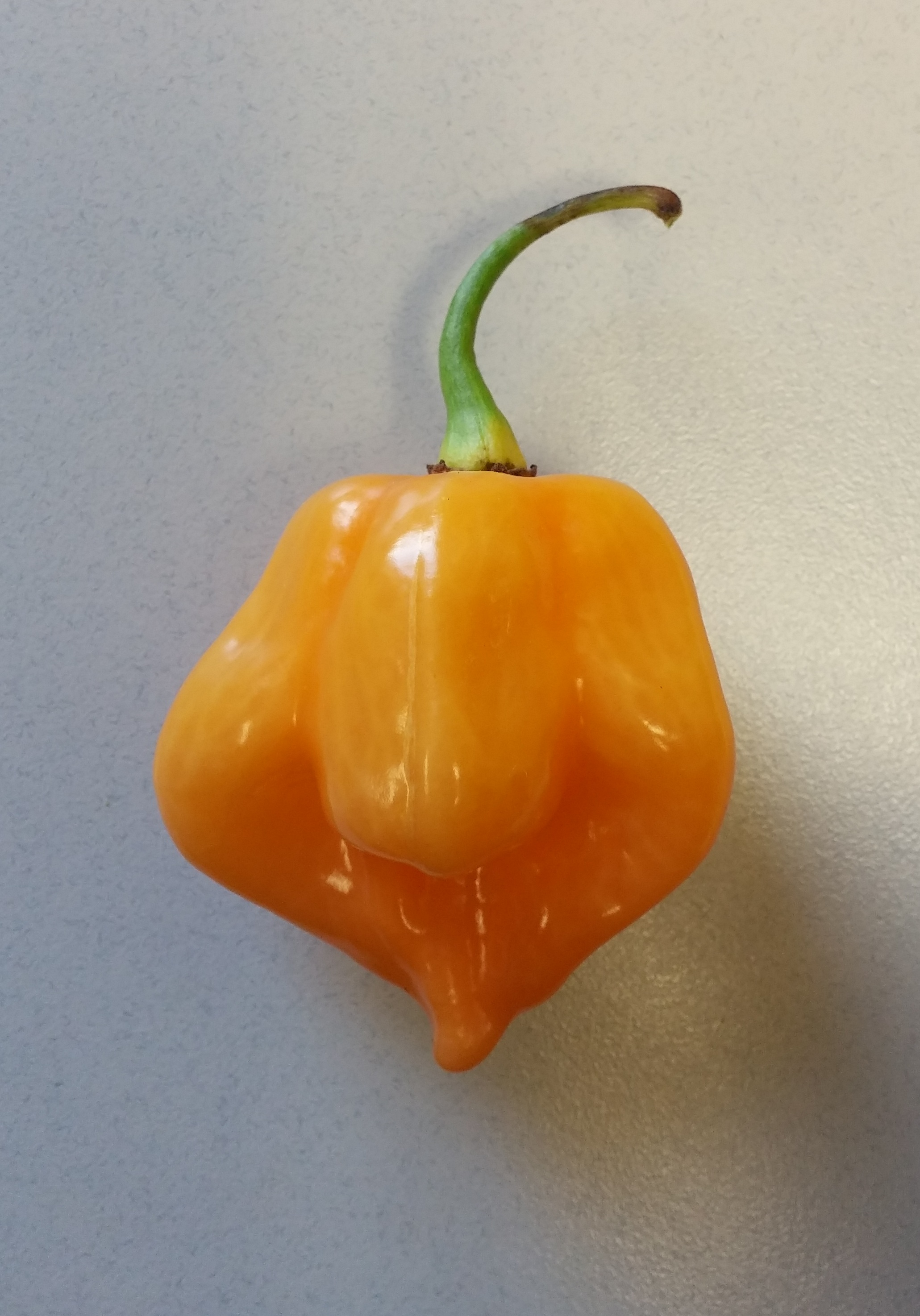
A single ripe scotch bonnet pepper.

== See also ==
- List of Capsicum cultivars
- Jamaican jerk spice
- Caribbean cuisine
- Cuisine of Jamaica
- Habanero
- Aji dulce
- Carolina Reaper
- Bajan pepper sauce
- Trinidad Moruga scorpion
- Nagabon
