= Mark McEwan =

Canadian chef (born 1957)

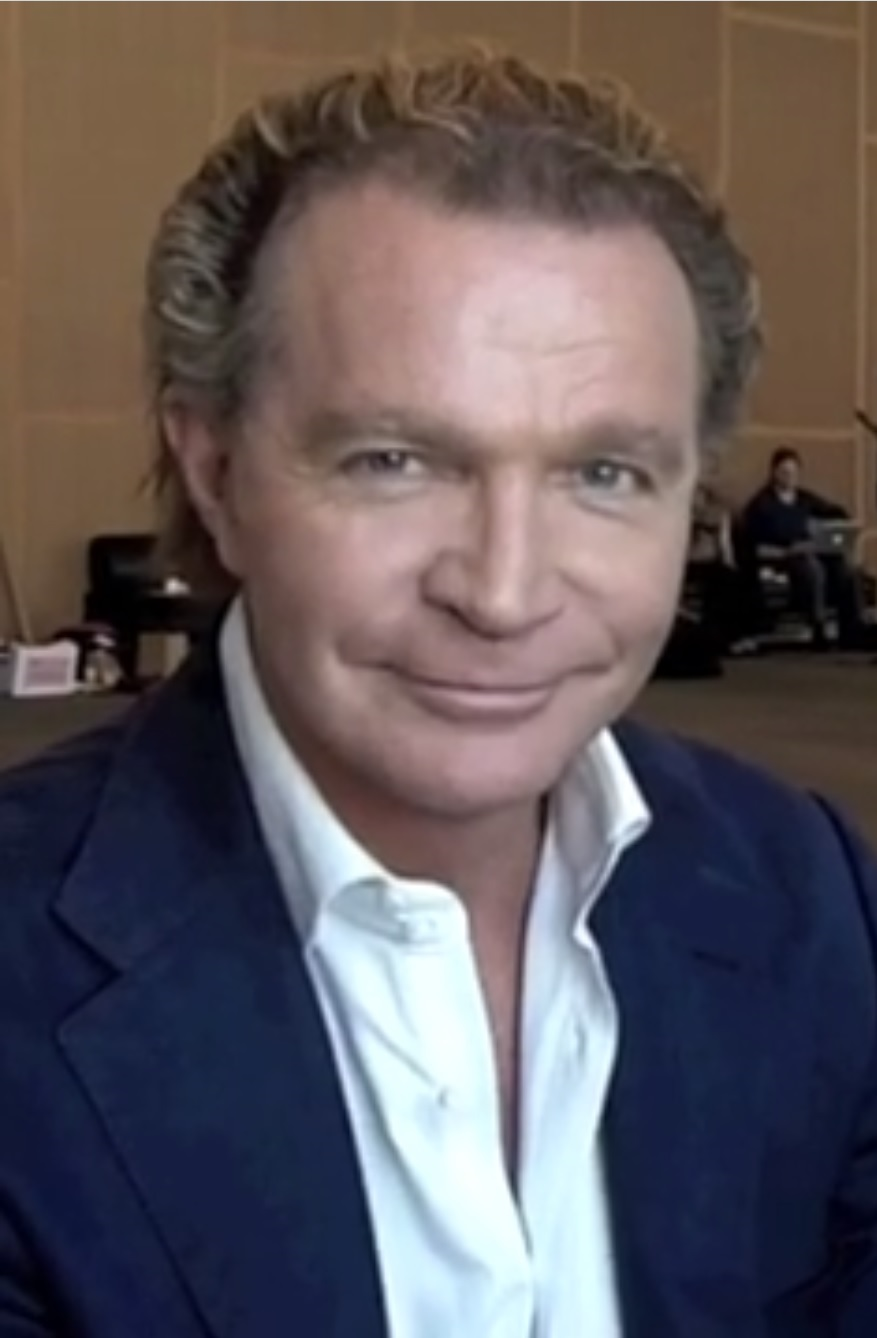
- McEwan discusses Top Chef Canada in 2011
- Born: Dennis Mark McEwan; May 7, 1957 (age 68); Buffalo, New York, U.S.
- Education: George Brown College
- Culinary career
- Current restaurants: Bymark, Toronto, Canada (2008–present), * Fabbrica TD Centre, Toronto, Canada (2018–2023)
- Previous restaurants: Fabbrica, Toronto, Canada (2010–2020), * One Restaurant, Toronto, Canada (2007–2022), * North 44, Toronto, Canada (1990–2018)
- Television show(s): The Heat with Mark McEwan, Superstar Chef Challenge, Top Chef Canada

Dennis Mark McEwan (born May 7, 1957) is an American-born Canadian celebrity chef based in Toronto, Ontario.

He was head judge on Food Network Canada's Top Chef Canada. McEwan had his own television show on Food Network Canada entitled The Heat, which followed his catering team from North 44 Caters as they served the influential and elite.

== Career ==
Dennis Mark McEwan was born on May 7, 1957, in Buffalo, New York. McEwan's first restaurant job was as a dishwasher in Buffalo at Mindy’s Wine Cellar, making $1.60 an hour. McEwan graduated from George Brown College in 1979. In 1981, McEwan was hired by the Sutton Place Hotel in Toronto as executive sous chef. Two years later he was promoted to chef. He opened his first restaurant, North 44, in 1990.

Around 2002, he opened Bymark restaurant in the Financial District, Toronto. In August 2007, McEwan opened ONE at the Hazelton Hotel, a luxury hotel in Yorkville, Toronto. In 2010, McEwan opened Fabbrica, an Italian restaurant, at Shops at Don Mills. In June 2009, McEwan opened a $6 million, gourmet food supermarket "McEwan" at Shops at Don Mills. In July 2015, McEwan opened a second 6,000 square foot location in the PATH at the TD Centre. In 2012, McEwan was commissioned by US-based OTG Management to aid in the opening of two restaurants, Fetta Panini Bar and Heirloom Bakery Café, in Toronto Pearson International Airport, consulting on their opening menus. McEwan, his grocery store, also creates "grab-and-go" items such as sandwiches, salads, snack boxes, and meals that are sold throughout the airport at 10 different kiosks.

McEwan's first book, Great Food at Home, was published in early 2011 and his second book Rustic Italian is based on the recipes from Fabbrica. McEwan teamed up with Jascor/Fresco in 2011 to brand a set of cookware that is now sold on the Shopping Channel and Hudson's Bay across Canada.

== Restaurants ==
=== Active ===
- Bymark (2008–present), 66 Wellington Street W, Toronto, Ontario, Canada
- Fabbrica TD Centre (2018–present), 66 Wellington Street W, Toronto, Ontario, Canada
- McEwan's Fine Foods (2009–present), specialty grocery store, Shops at Don Mills, Toronto, Ontario, Canada.

=== Closed or inactive ===
- ONE Restaurant (2007–2022), Hazelton Hotel, Toronto, Ontario, Canada, however as of 2022 McEwan is no longer a partner
- Fabbrica (2010–2020), 49 Karl Fraser Road, Toronto, Ontario, Canada
- North 44 (1990–2018), 2537 Yonge Street, Toronto, Ontario, Canada
- McEwan Fine Foods (2019–2021), specialty grocery store, near Yonge and Bloor Streets, Toronto, Ontario, Canada

== Filmography ==
Television appearances

- The Heat with Mark McEwan - host
- Superstar Chef Challenge - judge
- Top Chef Canada - head judge
- Wall of Chefs - judge
- Chef to Chef
