= Bajan pepper sauce =

Type of condiment

Bajan pepper sauce is a Barbadian-style hot sauce condiment made from hot peppers. It is similar to Cajun-style hot sauce and is traditionally applied in local Barbadian cuisine including meat, poultry, and fish.

The principal traditional ingredients of Bajan pepper sauce are Scotch bonnet peppers, mustard, and vinegar, with smaller amounts of cooking oil, onions, hot peppers, black pepper, and turmeric. Other varieties contain a small amount of sea water or alcohol for taste variety.

== See also ==
- Scoville scale
- Mustard (condiment)
