= Vikram Vij =

Indian-born Canadian chef (born 1964)

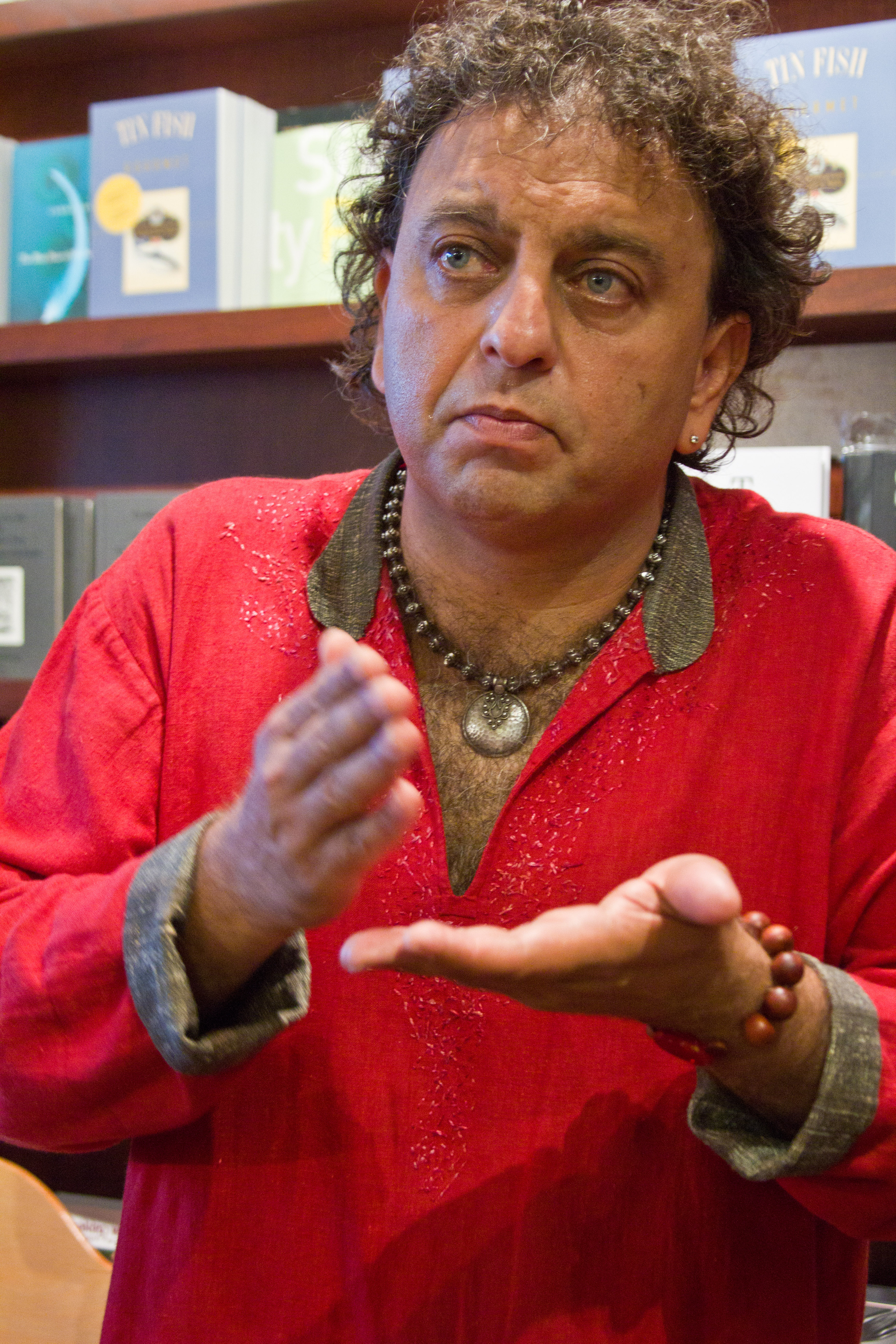
- Vij in 2010
- Born: December 1964 (age 61); Amritsar, Punjab, India
- Occupations: Restaurateur, chef, cookbook author
- Known for: Vij's and Rangoli, Vancouver and My Shanti South Surrey, BC

Vikram Vij (born 1964) is an Indian-born Canadian chef, cookbook author, and television personality. He is the owner, of the Indian cuisine restaurants Vij's and Rangoli Restaurant in Vancouver, British Columbia. He also owns My Shanti, a restaurant in South Surrey, British Columbia, which he closed in 2024. In 2014, Vij was announced as a new "dragon" investor on the Canadian reality show Dragons' Den for its ninth season and departed at the end of the season.

Vikram Vij grew up in India in Amritsar, Delhi and Bombay. In 1983, he left India to study Hotel/Motel Management in Salzburg, Austria. While there he received his chef's training. Vij later became a certified sommelier.

== Career ==
After working in Salzburg and Vienna for a few years, Vij moved to Canada in 1989, when he joined the Banff Springs Hotel, Alberta, Canada. From 1992 until 1994, Vij worked at Bishop's restaurant in Vancouver, British Columbia, for prominent Canadian chef John Bishop.

Eventually in 1994, at the age of 30 he opened a fine-dining restaurant, Vij's, in Vancouver. In the early days his parents would make the curry at their home and deliver it by bus to the restaurant. By 2003, Mark Bittman of The New York Times was praising Vij's Restaurant as "easily among the finest Indian restaurants in the world".

A decade later in 2004, Vij opened a second restaurant and market, the casual-style Rangoli. Rangoli sells their line of pre-packaged gourmet curries named "Vij's Inspired Indian Cuisine". In 2011, Vij completed and opened a food processing facility to better meet retailer interest in the product line. The product line is sold in grocery stores across Canada. Foods produced at the facility are also sold at food service sites such as Whistler Mountain, Loblaws City Markets and more.

Vij has two cookbooks, Nine Candid Minutes With Star Chef & Restaurateur Vikram Vij. They published Vij's: Elegant and Inspired Indian Cuisine in 2006, which won several awards in 2007, including Cuisine Canada's Gold Award for Best Cookbook and Cordon d'Or Gold Ribbon International Cookbook Award. In 2010, he published Vij's at Home: Relax Honey, which placed second in the Best Indian Cuisine Book in the World category at the 2010 Gourmand World Cookbook Awards. Vij has been an ongoing contributor to The Globe and Mail since November 28, 2007. Vikram Vij is working on a new Vijs Restaurant 2025 cookbook with his partner Jaan.

In 2012, Vij's Railway Express was launched onto the streets of Vancouver. It is a mobile food truck serving Indian curries to people in downtown Vancouver for weekday lunch and at private catering events.

Vij opened another restaurant, My Shanti, based in South Surrey, in 2014. My Shanti means "my peace" and the menu is based on Vij's culinary travels, and includes flavours, ingredients and influences from all over the world. My Shanti won Vancouver Magazine's Best Indian Restaurant in 2016. In November 2023, Vikram Vij and the management team announced the closure of My Shanti after nearly ten years of operations.

The Rangoli location on South Granville closed in May 2020, and the menu was consolidated with Vij's on Cambie due to the economic effects of the COVID-19 pandemic.

== Culinary philosophy ==
Chef Vikram Vij's culinary philosophy has been described as "keeping spices and cooking techniques Indian, while using meats, seafood and produce that are locally available." Vij has asserted that his cuisine should not be labeled fusion cuisine as the techniques and spices used are traditional to India. Vij advocates sustainability in his kitchen practices and ingredient selection. Two of their restaurants are known to have an all female kitchen staff.

== Personal life ==
Vikram has been in a relationship since his divorce. Vij divorced from his first wife in 2015. He enjoys travel, food, and wine tours, with two upcoming tours scheduled this year. Noted for his wine expertise, he has been featured in Sharp Magazine as a sommelier. Vikram Vij lives happily in Vancouver, British Columbia.

== Notable career milestones ==
Vij's Restaurant was one of the twenty featured restaurants at the James Beard Annual Gala Awards 1998, in New York City, and was invited to prepare dinner at the James Beard House. In 2001, Vij was invited to be a member of the prestigious gastronomic society Confrérie de la Chaîne des Rôtisseurs. In April 2012, Vij participated in the second annual Varli Food Festival at the Metropolitan Pavilion in Manhattan's Chelsea neighborhood, which was hosted by Top Chef's Padma Lakshmi and Indian celebrity chef Sanjeev Kapoor. More than 2,000 attended the festival to sample cuisine from the 60 high-profile Indian chefs including Vij.

Vij's restaurants have received numerous local awards including those from Vancouver Magazine's restaurant awards. In 1999, Vij's Restaurant was listed in the top five Vancouver restaurants in Gourmet magazine's annual restaurant awards, as well as receiving Chef of the Year from Vancouver Magazine in 2015. Vij himself received an Ernst and Young Entrepreneur of the Year Award for the Pacific region in hospitality and tourism in 2011.

Vij's Restaurant has been featured in a variety of North American television broadcasts and publications, including Food Network Canada, CNN, The Globe and Mail, The New York Times, The Washington Post, Travel + Leisure, Food & Wine, Bon Appétit, Sunset magazine, and Art Culinaire. Omni Television made a documentary titled A Day In The Life of… Vij's, giving an intimate portrait of Vij and Dhalwala, and a behind the scene look at Vij's Restaurant. Vij was featured on At the Table With, a Food Network Canada series, in 2008. The same year Vij's Rangoli was a subject of Anthony Bourdain's No Reservations. Vij made his famous lamb popsicles for Giada De Laurentiis when she visited Vij's Restaurant on her Food Network series Giada's Weekend Getaways. Vij was a guest judge on Top Chef Canada in 2011, and was invited back for the 2012 season. He was also the guest of honour in a 2013 Top Chef Canada episode dedicated to Indian cuisine. That episode also featured the Vij's At Home packaged foods, which were sampled by the contestants. He was also a judge on the first ever Chopped Canada show, which premiered on Food Network Canada in January 2014 and he appeared weekly on CBC's Recipe to Riches, which began in February 2014.

In June 2011, the BC Food Processors Association honoured Vij with the Rising Star Award. Vij's Railway Express, based on the chef's travels by rail throughout India, was awarded the inaugural People's Choice Award from Air Canada's enRoute Magazine, as Canada's Best New Restaurant in 2013.

In March 2013, Vij hosted the world's first ever live-streamed cook-along, Cook Live With Vikram Vij. As part of Vij's goal, to make Indian cuisine accessible to all, people were encouraged to join him live online and cook a family meal at the same time, taking instruction from an award-winning chef. They were able to Tweet questions and photos as the curry was being prepared.

My Shanti was listed as number one in the Globe and Mail's Top 10 New Vancouver Restaurants of 2014 and one of the Vancouver Sun's Best New Restaurants for 2014. My Shanti also won Vancouver Magazine's Best Indian Restaurant in 2016.

Within weeks of opening, My Shanti received a nomination from Air Canada's enRoute Magazine as one of Canada's Best New Restaurants. It is the second year in a row a Vij's establishment has been nominated, having won the People's Choice award in 2013 with Vij's Railway Express.

In October 2014, Vij made his debut as a Dragon on CBC's Dragons' Den and departed at the end of the season. He took his place in the Den alongside entrepreneurs Jim Treliving, Arlene Dickinson, David Chilton and Michael Wekerle.

In 2015, Vij was one of the recipients of the Top 25 Canadian Immigrant Awards presented by Canadian Immigrant Magazine.

In June 2015, Vikram Vij was awarded honorary Doctorates of Law by Simon Fraser University and in May 2016 they were honoured to receive honorary Doctorates of Law from the University of British Columbia.

== Advocacy and industry contribution ==
Vij is a passionate supporter of the sustainable food industry. He has championed many causes such as the Vancouver Aquarium's Ocean Wise Sustainable Seafood Program. He has been involved with Farm Folk City Folk and was past president and active member of The Chef's Table Society of British Columbia. He is also part of the Green Table Society and is involved in UBC Farm fundraisers. Vij's dedication to the work done at UBC resulted in the funding and opening of Vij's Kitchen, a state-of-the-art culinary learning facility at the University of British Columbia, dedicated to teaching the chefs and nutritionists of the future about ethnic food and cuisine. In 2010, Vij and fellow British Columbian chef, Robert Clark, spearheaded the 2nd Canadian Chefs' Congress on Vancouver Island, British Columbia, with the theme of "Oceans for Tomorrow". Vikram Vij has been donating to the Women's Eastside Vancouver Shelter because it is such an incredible cause. Vij is active in the Vancouver, Indo-Canadian arts and cultural community. He was a special guest and host at the 2011 Indian Summer Festival. The festival was a celebration of the Indian community's cultural contributions, the 125th anniversary of Vancouver, and the federal government's declaration of 2011 as "The Year of India in Canada". At the event he partnered with percussionist Ashwin Sood, blending the sounds and flavours of India. In 2012, Vij again was featured in the festival, this time leading a "culinary tour of India" at the opening gala. In addition, Vij supports the Vancouver International Bhangra Celebration Society. He hosted the organization's "Storyteller's Gala", held at the Museum of Vancouver in 2010. Vij has twice led small groups on educational food trips to India, which involved visiting homes of local cooks and chefs. He led the tour in northern India the first year, southern India the second.

== Bibliography ==
- Vij's: Elegant and Inspired Indian Cuisine. Douglas & McIntyre, 2006. ISBN 1-55365-184-7.
- Vij's at Home: Relax, Honey: The Warmth and Ease of Indian Cooking. Douglas & McIntyre, 2011. ISBN 1-55365-572-9.
- Vij A Chef's One-way Ticket to Canada With Indian Spices in His Suitcase. Penguin Canada, 2017 ISBN 978-0-670-06950-7.
