= List of Restaurant: Impossible episodes =

This is the list of the episodes for the American cooking and reality television series Restaurant: Impossible, produced by Food Network. The premise of the series is that within two days and on a budget of $10,000, celebrity chef Robert Irvine renovates a failing American restaurant with the goal of helping to restore it to profitability and prominence. Irvine is assisted by a designer (usually Taniya Nayak or Lynn Kegan, but sometimes Vanessa Deleon, Cheryl Torrenueva, Krista Watterworth, Yvette Irene, or Nicole Faccuito), along with general contractor Tom Bury, who sometimes does double duty as both general contractor and designer. After assessing the problems with the restaurant, Robert Irvine typically creates a plan for the new decor, oversees the cleaning of the restaurant, reduces the size of the menu and improves the food, develops a promotional activity, educates the restaurant's owners, or trains the staff, as needed by each restaurant. As of its final episode in April 2023, the show had completed missions in 42 states and the District of Columbia, excepting states of Alaska, Hawai'i, Iowa, Kansas, North Dakota, South Dakota, Utah, and Vermont.

== Episodes ==
=== Season 1 ===
No. overall	No. in season	Restaurant	Location	Original release date
1	1	"Villari's"	Palmyra, New Jersey	January 19, 2011
Robert tries to help this 60 year old restaurant, whose customer numbers have dwindled. The owner, Paul Villari III, has been unable to bring in new business and has found himself close to losing the family business. Robert makes drastic changes to the menu and décor. Chef Michael G (Giletto), who turned down the head chef position at Villari's, previously appeared on Food Network's Chopped and as a sous chef on Iron Chef America. Note: Paul's father, Paul Jr., who appeared at the end of the episode, died a month prior to the show's airing. The episode was dedicated to his memory.
2	2	"Mainelli's"	Providence, Rhode Island	January 26, 2011
Robert visits this Italian restaurant where the service is poor, the menu is huge and the staff in the kitchen struggle to cook the food. There are some issues with food safety and the kitchen has to be closed down, cleaned and the staff retrained. The restaurant is given a huge renovation and revamp and looks much better for the reveal.
3	3	"Rascal's BBQ and Crab House"	New Castle, Delaware	February 2, 2011
Robert tries to help this restaurant that is close to closure as there are no customers choosing to eat there. The restaurant is extremely filthy, causing Robert to initiate a huge deep clean to get the restaurant up to an acceptable standard. The restaurant is also given a makeover as is the menu with fresh dishes and a revamped catering menu and service. Rascal's BBQ and Crab House was the first restaurant from Restaurant: Impossible to close, months after their reopening.
4	4	"Salt Works II"	Wilmington, North Carolina	February 9, 2011
This restaurant claims to offer good home-cooked food yet all of the food comes out of a can. It needs Robert's help. Robert changes the interior of the restaurant, the menu and works with the staff to help them work as a team. Robert wants to aim for a younger customer base due to the location of the restaurant and reaches out to local college students to come and try the food at the restaurant.
5	5	"Meglio's"	Bridgeton, Missouri	February 16, 2011
Robert has his work cut out helping a restaurant that is stuck in the past, serving old family recipes straight from the freezer. The majority of the food is frozen and simply reheated; nothing is fresh. Robert helps retrain the staff in the kitchen to work with fresh ingredients and revamps the menu to feature fewer items but items that are cooked from fresh.
6	6	"Secret Garden Cafe"	Jacksonville, Florida	February 23, 2011
Robert helps a restaurant that only serves breakfasts and lunches but has no clear signature dish or any type of cuisine, serving a little bit of everything and not very well. The décor is ghastly and the staff are all over the place. The staff are taught organisation skills, structure is put in place and the menu and décor are updated.
7	7	"Flood Tide"	Mystic, Connecticut	March 2, 2011
Robert tries to help a restaurant with a bad reputation in the local area due in part to the owner. Robert witnesses an evening service filled with problems he needs to solve including a filthy kitchen. He cleans up the kitchen, helps the staff to take pride in their work and helps to make them feel like valued staff members. He updates the menu, redecorates the restaurant and works with the staff to manage their time better. The restaurant was renamed The Wood Grill at Flood Tide during production.

=== Season 2 ===
No. overall	No. in season	Restaurant	Location	Original release date
8	1	"Dodge City"	Harrisburg, Pennsylvania	July 6, 2011
Robert tries to fix a western-themed restaurant that has been opened for 30 years. The owner is wary of change, refusing to make the restaurant more modern. Robert eventually persuades him to make some changes to the menu and decor.
9	2	"La Stanza"	Philadelphia, Pennsylvania	July 13, 2011
Robert tries to help a 24 year old inexperienced manager who has been handed the reins of running an Italian restaurant by her father. There was a recent controversy with under-age sale of alcohol which gave the restaurant some bad publicity. He finds the problem isn't so much with the food but with the depressing décor and lack of promotion of the restaurant, as he begins to teach the daughter everything she needs to run a successful restaurant.
10	3	"Sweet Tea"	Pineville, North Carolina	July 20, 2011
Robert tries to help a relatively new restaurant being run by a couple with no experience in the restaurant business. With the owner's father's life savings depending on the success of the restaurant Robert is determined to turn the restaurant around. The owners Christine and Jeffrey have been struggling to keep the restaurant afloat for a year and there isn't much time or money left. The food comes straight out of a packet, can or the freezer. Robert turns around the menu and helps them to make proper sweet teas at the same time.
11	4	"County Fare"	Stafford, Virginia	July 27, 2011
A restaurant that has been opened for 5 years is now on the verge of closure and needs Robert's help. Owner Eric Green has sunk his life savings into the restaurant and is now close to losing it all. Robert discovers that the restaurant is filthy, the food is disgusting and bordering inedible and the décor needs a lot of work to be done. Robert works on updating the décor, creating a signature dish and to train the staff as they lack basic cooking skills.
12	5	"Snooty Fox"	Indianapolis, Indiana	August 3, 2011
Robert tries to fix an English pub that has been operating for 28 years. The regular customers are from an aging demographic and new customers aren't being drawn in. Robert arrives and is unimpressed with the British theme and finds filth in both the kitchen and dining room and some serious food hazards. Robert doesn't hesitate in shutting the restaurant down causing the head chef to walk out and never to return. Robert overhauls the menu and updates the décor. He finds two potential new head chefs and stages a cook off between the two to find the best candidate with them cooking British style food including traditional fish and chips.
13	6	"Pastori's"	Ellington, Connecticut	August 24, 2011
Owners Bill and Georgia Savvidis had owned the restaurant for over 20 years and it was once very successful. However, the success did not last and the restaurant is in its last few months before it will close. However this business is now on the verge of collapse and so is the relationship its owners. Matters weren't helped when Bill fired his head chef Steve who was also his son, this caused problems with both family relationships and with the business. The customers felt the biggest brunt of this as the food quality suffered. As well as the bad food and the fractured family, Robert also had to deal with a terrible decor. The menu was given a transformation and the kitchen staff were retrained.
14	7	"Scrimmages"	Wilmington, Delaware	August 31, 2011
A sports bar being run by four partners and with so many different opinions has only a matter of time before everyone falls apart, including the partnership. The partners are no longer making money and the relationships are beyond breaking point. Robert has his hands full with repairing both the restaurant's issues and the relationships between the owners.
15	8	"Mamma D's"	Pipersville, Pennsylvania	September 7, 2011
Owner Luigi has combined all his interests into one building: Italian restaurant, farm, vineyard and wine shop. Robert was totally against the animals being on the premises, mainly for food safety reasons but also because of the smell and this was his first change that he suggested. The food station that was preparing different items than the main kitchen, so this was also removed and Luigi's son who is a fully trained chef but wasn't given any freedom was promoted to head chef. The dining room was given a revamp with a lot of the clutter being removed from the restaurant.
16	9	"Off Street Cafe"	Cerritos, California	September 14, 2011
This episode takes Robert to Cerritos, a small town in sunny Southern California where he finds the Off Street Café, a gloomy restaurant co-owned by the ex-mother and daughter-in-law team of Robin and Rose. Robert and his crew attached ceramic plates to the walls and created a livelier atmosphere for its patrons and updates the menu.
17	10	"The Trails Eatery"	San Diego, California	September 21, 2011
Robert visits The Trails Eatery owned by a father and daughter team and run by Stacey Poon-Kinney. He finds a small yet delightful restaurant but Robert soon discovers that they are in a dire financial position and are very close to closing. The décor is given a makeover and it looks much more aesthetically pleasing afterwards.
18	11	"Cap'n and the Cowboy"	Port Charlotte, Florida	September 28, 2011
Robert visits Cap'n and the Cowboy in Port Charlotte, Florida, a steak and seafood restaurant owned by former dishwasher Nick Scaringella who worked his way up in restaurants before deciding to open his own. Robert is stunned to discover that he knows nothing about the restaurant's finances. Nick cuts corners and the food is mediocre. Robert helps by removing the clutter from the restaurant in his makeover and improves the food.
19	12	"Mad Cactus"	Strongsville, Ohio	November 2, 2011
Robert visits The Mad Cactus, a Mexican themed restaurant which is serving poor quality frozen Mexican food from a dreary dining room. The owners Tom and Robert constantly argue in this episode and the menu is given a makeover as is the interior and a salsa bar is added.
20	13	"McShane's"	East Syracuse, New York	November 9, 2011
Robert visits McShane's, run by owner Cindy who boasts about the chicken they serve but the problem is that no one is coming in to eat it. Robert finds that the restaurant and kitchen are both very dirty but it's not just the dirt in the restaurant that is a problem, the décor is tacky and in urgent need of updating. The food doesn't fare much better, although the half chicken impresses the rest of the food is lacking in flavour. Robert revamps the menu and the décor and adds a few menu items of his own.
21	14	"Coffee's Boilin' Pot"	Madisonville, Louisiana	November 16, 2011
Robert visits Coffee's Boiling Point where he meets owners Tim and Allene who fell in love when they worked in the restaurant. They got married and when the business was up for sale in 2005 they bought the business. Things went downhill after they bought it and because of the pressure of running they restaurant they fell out of love and soon divorced. Robert finds that the restaurant is dirty and that the food is frozen, poorly cooked and poorly seasoned.
22	15	"St. James Soup Kitchen"	Newark, New Jersey	November 23, 2011
This episode features an extra food challenge from Newark Mayor Cory Booker and is part of a Thanksgiving special to help to reopen a soup kitchen, restaurant and dining room run for the homeless by the local church charity that has been ravaged by a fire. They are in a race against time to be able to relaunch the restaurant in time for Thanksgiving and help serve a Thanksgiving dinner to the thousands of homeless people of Newark and New York City.
23	16	"Wildcat Café"	Canton, Ohio	December 7, 2011
Renamed from The Heritage Room during production. The Wildcat Café is operated by the students of the culinary program at Canton South High School.
24	17	"Sullivan's Grill"	Fruita, Colorado	January 4, 2012
Robert visits Sullivan's Grill and meets owner Ginny who is on the verge of bankruptcy and had lost her husband, Jesse, five months earlier to a suicide. The restaurant and kitchen are in a terrible state and in desperate need of a revamp. There was confusion surrounding the direction of the business and the theme of the restaurant. They inherited a Mexican menu with the restaurant and kept some of the menu items whilst also adding new dishes. Ginny was working 80 hours a week to keep the restaurant in business and corners had been cut, some of the food was canned or prepackaged. The restaurant was given a huge makeover and the menu was improved.
25	18	"Hoffman's Bistro"	Santa Cruz, California	January 11, 2012
Robert visits Hoffmans, where they are losing $20,000 a month, are in $2 million of debt and in desperate need of Robert's help. The family are also constantly arguing and the relationships are suffering. Robert soon discovers that the main problem is the lack of a clear identity, deciding if they are a restaurant or a bakery? He tells them they need to be strong on both or to focus their attention on just one identity. As a result, the pastry cases which once displayed Ed's cakes were replaced with a wine bar and the restaurant is given a makeover.

=== Season 3 ===
No. overall	No. in season	Restaurant	Location	Original release date
26	1	"Moss' Prime Rib & Spaghetti House"	Elyria, Ohio	February 8, 2012
27	2	"Chatterbox"	Windham, New Hampshire	February 15, 2012
28	3	"Anna Maria's"	Dunmore, Pennsylvania	February 22, 2012
Note: The owner of Anna Maria's, Jack Sileo, Sr., died a month after their reopening. The episode was dedicated to his memory.
29	4	"Del's"	Pittsburgh, Pennsylvania	February 29, 2012
30	5	"Woody's Tupelo Steakhouse"	Tupelo, Mississippi	March 7, 2012
31	6	"Valley View"	Quarryville, Pennsylvania	March 14, 2012
32	7	"Pelican Grill"	Seabrook, Texas	April 25, 2012
33	8	"Mama Lee's Soul Food Restaurant"	San Antonio, Texas	May 2, 2012
34	9	"Pappas Restaurant"	Benicia, California	May 9, 2012
35	10	"Ristorante Barolo"	Aptos, California	May 16, 2012
36	11	"University Grill"	Burlington, North Carolina	May 23, 2012
37	12	"Pollard's Bar-B-Que"	Memphis, Tennessee	May 30, 2012
38	13	"Horton's Kids"	Washington, DC	June 13, 2012
In this episode, Robert is given a mission by First Lady Michelle Obama to transform a community center for underprivileged children.

=== Season 4 ===
No. overall	No. in season	Restaurant	Location	Original release date
39	1	"Longbranch Steak and Seafood"	Fayetteville, Georgia	July 11, 2012
40	2	"The Main Dish"	Meridianville, Alabama	July 18, 2012
41	3	"Zandi's Grill"	Millersville, Maryland	July 25, 2012
42	4	"Italian Village"	Milmont Park, Pennsylvania	August 1, 2012
43	5	"Stella's Italian Restaurant"	Stratford, Connecticut	August 8, 2012
44	*	"Wedding: Impossible"	NA	August 18, 2012
Recaps Robert's wedding to wrestler Gail Kim.
45	*	"Behind the Impossible"	NA	August 22, 2012
Behind-the-scenes footage and revisits to Moss', Dodge City, Trails, and McShane's.
46	6	"Gusanoz Mexican Restaurant"	Lebanon, New Hampshire	August 29, 2012
47	7	"Frankie's"	Three Rivers, Michigan	September 5, 2012
48	8	"Paliani's Restaurant"	Burton, Michigan	September 12, 2012
49	9	"Michele's"	Corry, Pennsylvania	September 19, 2012
50	10	"Maple Tree Cafe"	Las Vegas, Nevada	September 26, 2012
51	11	"Whistle Stop"	Hot Springs, Arkansas	October 3, 2012
52	12	"Valley Inn"	Palos Hills, Illinois	October 10, 2012
53	13	"Oleander Bar And Grill"	Olean, New York	October 17, 2012

=== Season 5 ===
No. overall	No. in season	Restaurant	Location	Original release date
54	1	"Poco's on the Boulevard"	Kansas City, Missouri	November 21, 2012
55	2	"Rohrer's Tavern"	North Bend, Ohio	November 28, 2012
56	3	"Bronk's Bar and Grill"	Lake City, Minnesota	December 5, 2012
57	*	"Holiday: Impossible"	Joplin, Missouri	December 9, 2012
Renovation of the Boys & Girls Club which served homeless children following the 2011 Joplin tornado. Robert and his team, including Chef Michael Chiarello, must also cook a child-friendly meal for the staff, children, and their families. Unlike other episodes, the team was given three days and $30,000 to renovate and improve.
58	4	"Rising Sun Bistro"	Kalispell, Montana	December 19, 2012
59	5	"Whiskey Creek Steakhouse"	Keyport, Washington	January 2, 2013
60	6	"Windseeker Restaurant"	The Dalles, Oregon	January 16, 2013
61	7	"Sapori D'Italia"	Fountain Hills, Arizona	January 23, 2013
62	8	"Nanny Goats Cafe and Feed Bin"	Kilgore, Texas	February 20, 2013
63	9	"Dinner Bell"	Madison, Tennessee	February 27, 2013
64	10	"Maniaci's Italian Bistro"	Mohnton, Pennsylvania	March 10, 2013
65	11	"Caseyville Cafe"	Caseyville, Illinois	March 13, 2013
66	12	"Soup to Nuts Diner"	Tavares, Florida	March 17, 2013
67	13	"Sweet Tea's Restaurant & Catering"	Pineville, North Carolina	March 24, 2013

=== Season 6 ===
No. overall	No. in season	Title	Restaurant	Location	Original release date
68	1	"Something's Fishy"	Joe Willy's Seafood House	Fishkill, New York	April 14, 2013
69	2	"Father Knows Worst"	Old World Italian Restaurant	Murrells Inlet, South Carolina	April 21, 2013
70	3	"Creepy in Clearwater"	Smitty's Restaurant	Clearwater, Florida	April 28, 2013
71	4	"Drowning in Debt"	Mom & Dad's Italian Restaurant	DeFuniak Springs, Florida	May 12, 2013
72	5	"Muskrat Mayhem"	Wagon Wheel Family Restaurant	Smyrna, Delaware	May 19, 2013
73	6	"In the Pits"	Bryan's Smokehouse	Lufkin, Texas	May 26, 2013
74	7	"Lost in the Woods"	Pinehurst's Country Lodge	Greeley, Pennsylvania	June 9, 2013
75	8	"Sink or Swim"	Pier West Restaurant	Twin Lakes, Wisconsin	June 16, 2013
76	9	"It's All Greek to Me"	Angelo's Family Restaurant	Woodstock, Illinois	June 23, 2013
77	10	"Kalico Kraziness"	Kalico Kitchen	Douglas, Michigan	July 14, 2013
78	11	"Barely Edible"	Edibles Restaurant & Pub	Horsham, Pennsylvania	July 21, 2013
Renamed Hurley's American Grille during production.
79	12	"Benner Street in Bethlehem"	Benner Street Restaurant	Bethlehem, Pennsylvania	July 28, 2013
80	13	"Pie in the Sky"	Aponte's Pizzeria	Mason, Ohio	August 25, 2013

=== Season 7 ===
No. overall	No. in season	Title	Restaurant	Location	Original release date
81	1	"Bring Mama Back"	Mama Campisi's Restaurant	Saint Louis, Missouri	October 23, 2013
82	2	"Feathers Fly"	Ducky's Family Restaurant	Kokomo, Indiana	October 30, 2013
83	*	"Restaurant: Impossible Sneak Peek"	NA	NA	October 30, 2013
Favorite moments from "Restaurant Impossible" as well as a sneak peek at Robert Irvine's new series, "Restaurant Express."
84	3	"His Way or the Highway"	Windsor 75	Windsor, Connecticut	November 6, 2013
85	4	"Outside the Box"	Coach Lamp Restaurant & Pub	Louisville, Kentucky	November 13, 2013
86	5	"Soul Searching"	Georgia Boy Cafe	Hagerstown, Maryland	November 20, 2013
87	*	"Restaurant More Impossible"	Gusanoz Mexican Restaurant	Lebanon, New Hampshire	November 20, 2013
The episode was a re-air of Gusanoz Mexican Restaurant with trivia and behind-the-scenes stories.
88	6	"Unlucky Number Seven"	SEVEN	La Porte, Indiana	November 27, 2013
89	7	"Unfixable Family"	Mike LaSusa's Italian Restaurant	Oak Creek, Wisconsin	December 4, 2013
90	8	"Holiday: Impossible 2"	LBI Pancake House / Ship Bottom Volunteer Fire Department	Ship Bottom, New Jersey	December 8, 2013
Robert tries to revive the LBI Pancake House and the town's volunteer fire department, the Ship Point Fire Department, which were both devastated by Hurricane Sandy. Similar to the first Holiday: Impossible, the team is given three days and $50,000 instead of the usual $10,000. Also, there are two designers this time, with Lynn Kegan designing the LBI Pancake House, and with Cheryl Torrenueva designing the Ship Point Fire House.
91	9	"Goombazz Gone Wild"	Goombazz Big City Eatzz	Rock Island, Illinois	December 18, 2013
92	10	"Clueless in the Country"	Heather's Country Kitchen	Plains, Montana	January 1, 2014
93	11	"Monkey Business"	Spunky Monkey Bar & Grill	Auburn, Washington	January 15, 2014
94	12	"Dirty Laundry"	Hillbillies Restaurant	Murphys, California	January 29, 2014
95	13	"Mumbo Jumbo"	Estrada's Restaurant	Daly City, California	February 5, 2014
96	*	"Restaurant More Impossible"	Angelo's Family Restaurant	Woodstock, Illinois	February 12, 2014
The episode was a re-air of Angelo's Family Restaurant with trivia and behind-the-scenes stories.
97	*	"Restaurant More Impossible"	Coach Lamp Restaurant and Pub	Louisville, Kentucky	February 19, 2014
The episode was a re-air of Coach Lamp Restaurant and Pub with trivia and behind-the-scenes stories.
98	*	"Restaurant More Impossible"	Maple Tree Cafe	Las Vegas, Nevada	February 26, 2014
The episode was a re-air of Maple Tree Cafe with trivia and behind-the-scenes stories.
99	*	"Restaurant More Impossible"	The Trails Eatery	San Diego, California	March 1, 2014
The episode was a re-air of The Trails Eatery with trivia and behind-the-scenes stories.

=== Season 8 ===
No. overall	No. in season	Title	Restaurant	Location	Original release date
100	1	"Up in Smoke"	Mill Creek BBQ	Redlands, California	March 5, 2014
101	2	"A Lot to Lose"	Tootie's Texas BBQ	Cathedral City, California	March 12, 2014
102	3	"Fiery Family Fusion"	Pasion Latin Fusion	Albuquerque, New Mexico	March 19, 2014
103	4	"Pizza: Impossible (f/k/a N.Y. State of Mind)"	Mama Della's N.Y. City Pizzeria	Baton Rouge, Louisiana	March 26, 2014
104	5	"Ungratifying"	Gratifi Kitchen and Bar	Houston, Texas	April 2, 2014
105	6	"Face the Music"	Urban Roots	Oklahoma City, Oklahoma	April 9, 2014
106	7	"Treading Water"	Bryant's Seafood World	Hueytown, Alabama	April 23, 2014
107	8	"Bummed Out"	Bumbinos Italian Ristorante	Orange City, Florida	April 30, 2014
108	9	"Meet the Impossible"	NA	NA	May 7, 2014
109	10	"Living in the Dark Ages"	Cave Inn BBQ	Winter Garden, Florida	May 21, 2014
110	11	"The Writing on the Wall"	Big Jim's Bama Q	Hammondville, Alabama	May 28, 2014
111	12	"Saving Grace"	Grace's Place Bagels and Deli	Palm Coast, Florida	June 4, 2014
112	13	"No Day at the Beach"	Portu-Greek Cafe	Hudson, Florida	June 11, 2014

=== Season 9 ===
No. overall	No. in season	Title	Restaurant	Location	Original release date
113	1	"Fork in the Road"	Fork Diner	Calhoun, Georgia	July 23, 2014
114	2	"Culture Clash"	Marie's at Ummat Cafe	Atlanta, Georgia	July 30, 2014
115	3	"Bowling: Impossible"	Paul's Bar & Bowling	Paterson, New Jersey	August 6, 2014
116	4	"Golf: Impossible"	Pomona Golf and Country Club	Egg Harbor City, New Jersey	August 13, 2014
117	5	"Holy Cow!"	Country Cow Restaurant and Bar	Campton, New Hampshire	August 20, 2014
118	6	"No Laughing Matter"	Uncle Andy's Diner	Portland, Maine	August 27, 2014
119	7	"Take It Or Leave It"	El Bistro	Titusville, Pennsylvania	September 3, 2014
Renamed Renae's Corner during production
120	8	"Spicing Things Up"	Spicy Bar & Grill	Falls Church, Virginia	September 10, 2014
121	9	"Military: Impossible"	Green Beret Club	Fort Bragg, North Carolina	September 17, 2014
Renamed Smoke Bomb Grille during production.
122	10	"Drama at Mamma's"	Mamma Lucrezia's Restaurant	Bellefonte, Pennsylvania	September 24, 2014
123	11	"Paradise: Impossible"	Padre Rita Grill	South Padre Island, Texas	October 6, 2014
124	12	"An Abundance of Emotions"	Abudanza Ristorante	Wilbraham, Massachusetts	October 13, 2014
125	*	"Gross, Grosser, Grossest"	NA	NA	October 20, 2014
126	*	"Worst of the Worst"	NA	NA	October 27, 2014
127	13	"Recipe for Disaster"	Papa C's Eastside Cafe	Fairport, New York	November 3, 2014

=== Season 10 ===
No. overall	No. in season	Title	Restaurant	Location	Original release date	US viewers (millions)
128	1	"Without a Prayer"	Mama E's Wings & Waffles	Oklahoma City, Oklahoma	November 24, 2014	N/A
Note: This restaurant was previously featured on Guy Fieri's Diners, Drive-Ins and Dives in 2009.
129	2	"Holiday: Impossible"	Double "H" Ranch	Lake Luzerne, New York	December 8, 2014	N/A
Robert and his crew help transform and renovate a camp for children with life-threatening illnesses. Unlike most episodes, the team has three days and $50,000.
130	3	"Oh Brother!"	Knife and Fork Gastropub	San Antonio, Texas	December 15, 2014	0.948
131	*	"Biggest Blowups"	NA	NA	December 29, 2014	N/A
132	4	"Revved Up"	Shade Tree Customs and Cafe	Albuquerque, New Mexico	January 14, 2015	0.987
133	5	"Mystic Mystery"	Mystic Treats	Ashland, Oregon	January 28, 2015	N/A
134	6	"Betting the House"	Zoog's Caveman Cookin	Port Hadlock, Washington	February 4, 2015	0.968
135	7	"Dog and Pony Show"	Dog & Pony Alehouse	Renton, Washington	February 11, 2015	0.996
136	8	"Game Over"	Be'ne Pizza & Pasta	Omaha, Nebraska	February 18, 2015	N/A

=== Season 11 ===
No. overall	No. in season	Title	Restaurant	Location	Original release date	US viewers (millions)
137	1	"4,000 Square Feet of Trouble"	WhaBah Steakhouse	Bowling Green, Kentucky	March 18, 2015	1.144
138	2	"Double Trouble"	Valentino's and Italian Bistro	Summerville, South Carolina	March 25, 2015	1.152
In this episode, Robert is asked to transform two restaurants, Valentino's and Italian Bistro.
139	3	"Chocolate: Impossible"	Cocoamoda	Calvert, Texas	April 1, 2015	1.152
140	4	"When Life Gives You Lemons"	Zest Bistro	Downers Grove, Illinois	April 8, 2015	1.315
In this episode, Robert transforms a restaurant inside of The Lemon Tree Grocer. He also transforms the grocery store.
141	5	"Prescription for Failure"	Lyon's Pharmacy of Elkton	Elkton, Maryland	April 22, 2015	1.016
In this episode, Robert transforms an old lunch counter inside of a local family owned pharmacy.
142	6	"Going Down With Ship"	Gigi's Music Cafe	Sunrise, Florida	April 29, 2015	1.045
143	7	"The Ambush"	Tornatore's Pizzeria	Orlando, Florida	May 6, 2015	1.101
For the first time ever Robert ambushes a restaurant by not telling the owner in advance that the show is coming.
144	8	"Bad Juju"	The JuJu Bag	New Orleans, Louisiana	May 13, 2015	0.967

=== Season 12 ===
No. overall	No. in season	Title	Restaurant	Location	Original release date	US viewers (millions)
145	1	"Ambush: Breakfast Break-In"	Theresa's Restaurant	Bradenton, Florida	October 22, 2015	1.219
146	2	"Ambush: Son Sneak Attack"	Lake Arrowhead Sports Grille	Blue Jay, California	October 29, 2015	1.012
147	3	"Ambush: Eyes on the Surprise"	Copper Still Restaurant	Crestwood, Illinois	November 5, 2015	0.894
148	4	"Ambush: Stay ... Or Go?"	Ellendale's Restaurant	Nashville, Tennessee	November 12, 2015	1.013
149	5	"Ambush: Fight to the Finish"	Stella's Restaurant	New Kensington, Pennsylvania	November 19, 2015	1.099
150	6	"Ambush: Facing Fears"	Cape Horn Family Restaurant	Red Lion, Pennsylvania	December 3, 2015	0.958
151	7	"Holiday: Impossible"	Broken Arrow Ranch	Jackson, Wyoming	December 10, 2015	0.671
In this episode, Robert and his team transform a summer camp for at-risk teens. Unlike most episodes, the team has three days and $50,000.
152	8	"Ambush: Special Delivery"	La Casa Bianca	Whitehouse Station, New Jersey	December 17, 2015	1.015

=== Season 13 ===
No. overall	No. in season	Title	Restaurant	Location	Original release date	US viewers (millions)
153	1	"Ambush: Faded Star"	Starlight Restaurant and Pizza	West Orange, New Jersey	March 9, 2016	N/A
154	2	"Ambush: Beneath the Surface"	De Rican Chef	Virginia Beach, Virginia	March 16, 2016	N/A
155	3	"Ambush: A Taxing Situation"	BFE Bar and Grill	Waynesboro, Georgia	March 23, 2016	N/A
Renamed Pointers Grill At Hancock Landing during production.
156	4	"Ambush: In Robert We Trust"	Peppino's Ristorante	Oviedo, Florida	March 30, 2016	N/A
157	5	"Ambush: Out of Control"	Sip Bistro	Holly Springs, North Carolina	April 13, 2016	N/A
158	6	"Ambush: Exercise Surprise"	So Natural Organic Restaurant and Market	Harker Heights, Texas	April 20, 2016	N/A
159	7	"Ambush: Cray, Cray"	Cray Eatery and Drinkery	Columbus, Ohio	April 27, 2016	N/A
160	8	"Ambush: Third Ambush Is the Charm"	Broad Street Bistro	North Versailles, Pennsylvania	May 4, 2016	N/A

=== Season 14 ===
No. overall	No. in season	Title	Restaurant	Location	Original release date	US viewers (millions)
161	1	"Dying Diner"	Rosie's Cafe	Escondido, California	April 20, 2019	N/A
162	2	"Fight at Filomena's"	Filomena's Italian Kitchen and Market	Costa Mesa, California	April 27, 2019	N/A
163	3	"Mom Finds Her Mojo"	Incredible Cafe	San Diego, California	May 4, 2019	N/A
164	4	"Smoky Steakhouse"	Copper Steer Steakhouse	Safford, Arizona	May 11, 2019	N/A

=== Season 15 ===
No. overall	No. in season	Title	Restaurant	Location	Original release date
165	1	"Hard Times at Josephine's"	Josephine's Cooking	Chicago, Illinois	July 20, 2019
166	2	"Revisited: Owner Tries to Do It All"	Dodge City Steakhouse	Harrisburg, Pennsylvania	July 27, 2019
167	3	"A Family Restaurant at War"	McLanks Family Restaurant	Columbia, Missouri	July 27, 2019
168	4	"Revisited: One-Woman Show"	The Country Cow Restaurant and Bar	Campton, New Hampshire	July 27, 2019
169	5	"Caribbean Catastrophe"	Chez Olga	Grand Rapids, Michigan	August 3, 2019
170	6	"Revisited: Family Regains Confidence"	Gusanoz Mexican Restaurant	Lebanon, New Hampshire	August 3, 2019
171	7	"A Single Dad Sparks His Passion"	Mike Audia's Restaurant	Nutter Fort, West Virginia	August 10, 2019
172	8	"Revisited: The Hidden Costs of Business"	The Trails Eatery	San Diego, California	August 10, 2019
173	9	"Dull Diner Dilemma"	Rosie's Diner	North Chelmsford, Massachusetts	August 17, 2019
174	10	"Revisited: Learning Leadership"	Off Street Cafe	Cerritos, California	August 17, 2019
175	11	"Saving a Family's Legacy"	Al's Seafood	Essex, Maryland	August 24, 2019
176	12	"Revisited: All in the Family"	Sapori D'Italia	Fountain Hills, Arizona	August 24, 2019
177	13	"Lakefront Disaster"	Besse's on Clear Lake	Tomahawk, Wisconsin	August 31, 2019
178	14	"Revisited: Revisiting the First Ambush"	Tornatore's Pizzeria	Orlando, Florida	September 7, 2019
Robert Irvine heads back to Tornatore's Pizza in Orlando, FL, to see if the owner has managed to keep his business afloat after Robert remodeled the failing restaurant and retooled its menu.
179	15	"A Daughter Finds Her Groove"	Madison Street Retro Diner	Muncie, Indiana	September 7, 2019
180	16	"Revisited: Marriage: Impossible"	Joe Willy's Seafood House	Fishkill, New York	September 7, 2019

=== Season 16 ===
No. overall	No. in season	Title	Restaurant	Location	Original release date
181	*	"Most Extreme Moments"	NA	NA	December 26, 2019
182	1	"Dumplings in Delaware"	Southern Grille	Ellendale, Delaware	December 26, 2019
183	2	"Revisited: A Failing Restaurant Is No Laughing Matter"	Uncle Andy’s Diner	Portland, Maine	January 2, 2020
184	3	"Cleaning Up in Mississippi"	Rossini’s Cucina Italiana	Ridgeland, Mississippi	January 2, 2020
185	4	"Revisited: An Owner Losing Control"	Theresa’s Restaurant	Bradenton, Florida	January 9, 2020
186	5	"Help Is On The Way"	Edgar’s Restaurant	Akron, Ohio	January 9, 2020
187	6	"Revisited: Ruffled Feathers"	Woody's Tupelo Steakhouse	Tupelo, Mississippi	January 16, 2020
188	7	"Old Habits Die Hard"	Perella's Ristorante	Warren, Rhode Island	January 16, 2020
189	8	"Revisited: New Roles, New Results"	Foxfire Grill	Alexandria, Virginia	January 23, 2020
190	9	"Revisited: Chaos in the Kitchen"	Padre Rita Grill	South Padre Island, Texas	January 23, 2020
191	10	"Out with the Old, in with the New"	Carmine's Chianti Cow	Port Jervis, New York	January 30, 2020
192	11	"Revisited: A Family Recovering From Tragedy"	De Rican Chef	Virginia Beach, Virginia	January 30, 2020
193	12	"Saving a Piece of History"	Garrett's Mill Brewing Co.	Garrettsville, Ohio	February 6, 2020
194	13	"Revisited: Going Down with the Ship"	Gigi's Music Cafe	Sunrise, Florida	February 6, 2020
195	14	"Revisited: Beloved Restaurant on the Rocks"	Drake's Place	Ferguson, Missouri	February 13, 2020
196	15	"Revisited: Family Matters"	So Natural Organic Restaurant and Market	Harker Heights, Texas	February 13, 2020
197	16	"Cajun Seafood Crisis"	The Balcony	Larose, Louisiana	February 20, 2020
198	17	"Revisited: An Entire Life's Savings"	Hillbillies Restaurant	Murphys, California	February 20, 2020
199	18	"Chattanooga Blues"	Blue Orleans Seafood Restaurant	Chattanooga, Tennessee	February 27, 2020
200	19	"Lost in the Bayou"	Lil G's Cajun Restaurant	Belle Chasse, Louisiana	March 5, 2020
201	20	"Revisited: For the Troops"	Hillbillies Restaurant	Fort Bragg	March 12, 2020
202	21	"Greek Tragedy"	Taverna Trela	Delray Beach, Florida	March 12, 2020

=== Season 17 ===
No. overall	No. in season	Title	Restaurant	Location	Original release date
203	1	"Quarantine Check-In"	NA	NA	April 30, 2020
204	2	"First Episode Rewatch"	NA	NA	May 7, 2020
205	3	"Saving a Pastor's Passion"	Loyd Have Mercy	Titusville, Florida	May 14, 2020
206	4	"Fixing a Family in Houston"	Habanera and the Guero	Houston, Texas	May 21, 2020
207	5	"Revisited: Helping One of Our Own"	Rosie's Cafe	Escondido, California	May 28, 2020
208	6	"Back on Track in Glendora"	T. Phillip's Alehouse and Grill	Glendora, California	June 4, 2020
209	7	"The Ginger Monkey is Going Under"	The Ginger Monkey	Chandler, Arizona	June 11, 2020
210	8	"Revisited: Out of Date But Not Out of Time"	Paul's Bar and Bowling	Paterson, New Jersey	June 18, 2020
211	9	"Revisited: The Soul of a Marriage"	Mama E's	Oklahoma City	July 16, 2020
212	*	"Back in Business: Losing Hope in Mississippi"	Rossini’s Cucina Italiana	Ridgeland, Mississippi	July 30, 2020
213	*	"Back in Business: Leadership Lessons in Florida"	Loyd Have Mercy	Titusville, Florida	August 6, 2020
214	*	"Back in Business: Reuniting Family in Missouri"	McLanks Family Restaurant	Columbia, Missouri	August 13, 2020
215	*	"Back in Business: Branching Out"	Drake's Place	Ferguson, Missouri	August 20, 2020
216	*	"Back in Business: Back Nine"	Edgar’s Restaurant	Akron, Ohio	August 27, 2020
217	*	"Back in Business: Garrett’s"	Garrett's Mill and Brewing Co.	Garrettsville, Ohio	September 3, 2020

=== Season 18 ===
No. overall	No. in season	Title	Restaurant	Location	Original release date
218	*	"Back in Business: New Tricks"	Perella's Ristorante	Warren, Rhode Island	January 3, 2021
219	*	"Back in Business: Rosier Days"	Rosie’s Diner	North Chelmsford, Massachusetts	January 3, 2021
220	*	"Back in Business: Al’s Seafood"	Al's Seafood	Essex, Maryland	January 3, 2021
221	*	"Back in Business: Perseverance"	Southern Grille	Ellendale, Delaware	January 3, 2021
222	1	"Moving On in Montana"	Don Luis Restaurant	Billings, Montana	January 7, 2021
223	2	"Destination, Hawk Springs"	The Emporium	Hawk Springs, Wyoming	January 14, 2021
224	3	"Colorado Couple in Crisis"	Millonzi's	Fairplay, Colorado	January 21, 2021
225	4	"Bogged Down in Buffalo"	Casa Di Francesca's	Buffalo, New York	January 28, 2021
226	5	"Community Hub in Chaos"	Park Vue Soul Food Bar and Restaurant	Buffalo, New York	February 4, 2021
227	6	"Taking Ownership In Vegas"	Polaris Street Cafe	Las Vegas	February 11, 2021
228	7	"Saving an American Dream"	Burnt Offerings	Las Vegas	February 18, 2021
229	8	"A Dream in Shambles"	A Pizza Melody	Las Vegas	February 25, 2021
230	9	"House of Cards"	Cafe No Fur	Las Vegas	March 4, 2021
231	10	"Listless in Louisiana"	Boutte’s Bayou Restaurant	Lafitte, Louisiana	March 11, 2021
232	11	"Friends in Need"	Dunbar’s Creole Cuisine	New Orleans	March 18, 2021
233	12	"Nancy Foots the Bill"	Cosentino's Ristorante	Geneva, New York	April 8, 2021

=== Season 19 ===
No. overall	No. in season	Title	Restaurant	Location	Original release date
234	1	"The Sinking Anchor"	The Anchor	Louisville, Tennessee	May 20, 2021
235	2	"R.E.S.P.E.C.T."	Mr. B's Southern Kitchen	Tampa, Florida	May 27, 2021
236	3	"Floundering Fish House"	Z Fish House	Loudon, Tennessee	June 3, 2021
237	4	"Sub Shop SOS"	Turnpike's Rest Stop	Spring Hill, Florida	June 10, 2021
238	5	"Restoring a Reputation"	Deraney's Two City Tavern	Barnesville, Georgia	June 17, 2021
239	6	"A Friendship in Peril"	J’s Restaurant	Waveland, Mississippi	June 24, 2021
240	7	"Big Trouble in Tennessee"	Big Tom's Backyard Grill and Bar	Cleveland, Tennessee	July 1, 2021
241	8	"Irish Eyes are Frowning"	Grille No. 13	Waldorf, Maryland	July 8, 2021
242	9	"Soul Food in the Dark"	Soul Food in the Park	York, Pennsylvania	July 15, 2021
243	10	"The Sinking Ship Inn"	Ship Inn	Exton, Pennsylvania	July 22, 2021
244	11	"Resentment on the Bayou"	On The Bayou	Milwaukee, Wisconsin	July 29, 2021
245	12	"The Dutiful Son"	Mexican Village	Milwaukee, Wisconsin	August 12, 2021
246	13	"Delusions of Grandeur"	Gaston's	Orland Park, Illinois	August 19, 2021

=== Season 20 ===
No. overall	No. in season	Title	Restaurant	Location	Original release date
247	1	"Extreme British Makeover"	From Across the Pond	Colleyville, Texas	August 26, 2021
248	2	"A Big Mess in Texas"	Fun Time Cafe	Joshua, Texas	September 2, 2021
249	3	"Big Ego, Big Trouble"	Soul Food in the Park	York, Pennsylvania	December 30, 2021
250	4	"Dirtiest. Kitchen. Ever."	Jalisco Cafe	San Diego	January 6, 2022
251	5	"Burnt Out in Berkeley"	KC’s BBQ	Berkeley, California	January 13, 2022
252	6	"Virtually Impossible"	Casa Real	Loveland, Colorado	January 20, 2022
253	7	"Slumping Sales in San Jose"	The Breakfast Place	San Jose, California	January 27, 2022
254	8	"Out with the Old, In with the New"	Kaiserhof	San Diego	February 3, 2022
255	9	"Not So Peachy Keen"	Denos I-76	Keenesburg, Colorado	February 24, 2022
256	10	"Holding on to the Past"	Rest Haven	Clarksdale, Mississippi	March 10, 2022
257	11	"It’s Not Rocket Science"	Mizz Juju's	Huntsville, Alabama	March 24, 2022
258	12	"Hard Knocks in Hendersonville"	Dreadlife Kitchen	Hendersonville, North Carolina	April 7, 2022
259	13	"No Help Wanted"	7th Restaurant and Lounge	Charlotte, North Carolina	April 21, 2022

=== Season 21 ===
No. overall	No. in season	Title	Restaurant	Location	Original release date
260	1	"The Final Shot"	Smith's Soul Food Bistro	Gastonia, North Carolina	April 28, 2022
261	2	"Best Friends Forever"	Moondoggy's Pizza	Brunswick, Georgia	May 5, 2022
262	3	"My Way or the Highway"	Forks and Flavors	Kennesaw, Georgia	May 12, 2022
263	4	"Family Recipe for Disaster"	Giovanni's Italian Restaurant	Sylacauga, Alabama	May 19, 2022
264	5	"Marriage on the Rocks"	Sweet Potato Cafe	Stone Mountain, Georgia	May 26, 2022
265	6	"Mistrust and Malaise in Madison"	Grumpy's Diner	Madison, Florida	June 2, 2022
266	7	"Fighting for Your Family"	Amistad Grill	Homestead, Florida	June 9, 2022
267	8	"Schooling a Teacher"	333 Restaurant	Grenada, Mississippi	June 16, 2022
268	9	"Legacy on the Line"	Eddie's	Shreveport, Louisiana	June 23, 2022
269	10	"Anguish in Abilene"	Texas Cowboy BBQ	Abilene, Texas	June 30, 2022
270	11	"A Trifecta of Failure"	Steak-N-Stuff	Cottonwood, Arizona	July 7, 2022
271	12	"Stuck in the Old School"	Vinny's Little Italy	Boulder City	July 14, 2022
272	13	"Lifting the Weight"	Greg's BBQ	Belen, New Mexico	July 21, 2022

=== Season 22 ===
No. overall	No. in season	Title	Restaurant	Location	Original release date	US viewers (millions)
273	1	"A Mother's Guilt"	Ranch House Cafe	Ash Fork, Arizona	December 29, 2022	N/A
274	2	"Living Up to Mom"	Amigo Cafe	Kayenta, Arizona	January 5, 2023	N/A
275	3	"Clueless in Idaho"	Island Kine Grinds	Nampa, Idaho	January 12, 2023	N/A
Notes: Renamed Aloha Island Grille during production. It's also a converted Pizza Hut restaurant location.
276	4	"Missing Pepper in Baton Rouge"	Pimanyoli's Sidewalk Cafe and Catering	Baton Rouge, Louisiana	January 19, 2023	N/A
277	5	"Roux the Day"	Boil and Roux	Baton Rouge, Louisiana	January 26, 2023	N/A
278	6	"Hot Doggin' It in Memphis"	Big Dawg's	Memphis, Tennessee	February 2, 2023	N/A
279	7	"Running on Empty"	Walters' Gas & Grill	Opelika, Alabama	February 9, 2023	N/A
280	8	"Fighting for Gigi"	GiGi's Place	Covington, Georgia	February 16, 2023	N/A
281	9	"Stalled on the Runway"	Runway Cafe	Greenville, South Carolina	February 23, 2023	N/A
282	10	"Sunnyside Down"	Sunnyside Café	Williamston, Michigan	March 2, 2023	N/A
283	11	"Driven to Tears"	Leah's Korner Kafe	Coleman, Michigan	March 9, 2023	N/A
284	12	"A Family Divided"	Franco Di Roma	Middletown, New York	March 16, 2023	N/A
285	13	"The Imbalanced Chef"	The Balanced Chef	Rome, New York	March 23, 2023	N/A
286	14	"Mountain Town Mess"	White Mountain Tavern	Lincoln, New Hampshire	March 30, 2023	N/A
287	15	"Trick or Treat"	Dutch Treat	Franconia, New Hampshire	April 6, 2023	N/A
