= Dinner Party Wars =

- Genre: Reality
- Presented by: Corbin Tomaszeski; Anthea Turner
- Country of origin: Canada
- Original language: English
- No. of seasons: 3

Production
- Running time: 60 minutes
- Production company: Cineflix Inc.

Original release
- Network: Food Network Canada; W Network

Dinner Party Wars is a series that airs on Food Network Canada that is produced by Cineflix. Dinner Party Wars is a three-night, high-stakes dining challenge that dares couples to be the best by any means possible. From setting the menu and the table, to the cooking, conversation, and all the kitchen crises, hidden cameras capture every detail for viewers. The show is narrated by Garnet Williams, while two expert judges, Chef Corbin Tomaszeski and Anthea Turner, watch every move from a distance and determine the winner from the comfort of their curbside studio.

== Host Information ==
=== Corbin Tomaszeski ===
Top Canadian chef Corbin has served as the executive chef at Holts Cafe in Toronto. Now, he is the executive chef at Toronto, Ontario's unique and chic restaurant c5, and also manages the fashion retailers’ catering and food hall business at their flagship store in Toronto. Chef Corbin made his TV debut in Crash My Kitchen (Food Network) and is a regular on Restaurant Makeover (HGTV/Food Network).

=== Anthea Turner ===
Anthea Turner is a TV presenter from Britain.

== Episodic Information ==
=== Season 1 ===
Episode 1: The Bold & Brash

Episode 2: Duck, Duck, Swan

Episode 3: Whine and Cheese

Episode 4: Cats & Hammered

Episode 5:Smoking Guinea Pig

Episode 6: It’s ALIVE

Episode 7: Opa!

Episode 8: The Kids’ Table

Episode 9: Belly Flop

Episode 10: Undress for Dinner

Episode 11: If You Can’t Take the Heat...

Episode 12: Big City Battle

Episode 13: The Last Night

=== Season 2 ===
Episode 14: Chicken Bingo

Episode 15: Truth or Dairy

Episode 16: Hungary for Love

Episode 17: Fast Cars, Raw Flesh

Episode 18: Gnocchi Knockdown

Episode 19: Guess Who’s Coming to Dinner?

Episode 20: Jamaica Me Hungry

Episode 21: Photo Finish

Episode 22: It’s A Family Affair

Episode 23: High on the Hog

Episode 24: A Bird in the Hand

Episode 25: A Pizza the Action

Episode 26: Indecent Proposal
