= Brad Long =

Brad Long may refer to:

- Brad Long (chef)
- Brad Long (actor)
