= Corbin Tomaszeski =

Canadian restaurant consultant and chef

- Born: Corbin Tomaszeski; 1972 or 1973 (age 53–54) near Edmonton, Alberta, Canada
- Education: Culinary Arts at NAIT
- Culinary career
- Television show(s): Restaurant Makeover Dinner Party Wars

Corbin Tomaszeski (born c. 1972) is a Canadian restaurant consultant and celebrity chef based in Toronto, Ontario. He is known for his appearances on the Food Network shows Restaurant Makeover and Dinner Party Wars. He graduated from the Northern Alberta Institute of Technology. Tomaszeski was formerly the executive chef at the Westin Harbour Castle Hotel and conference center in Toronto.
