= Krista Watterworth =

American interior designer

Krista Watterworth Alterman
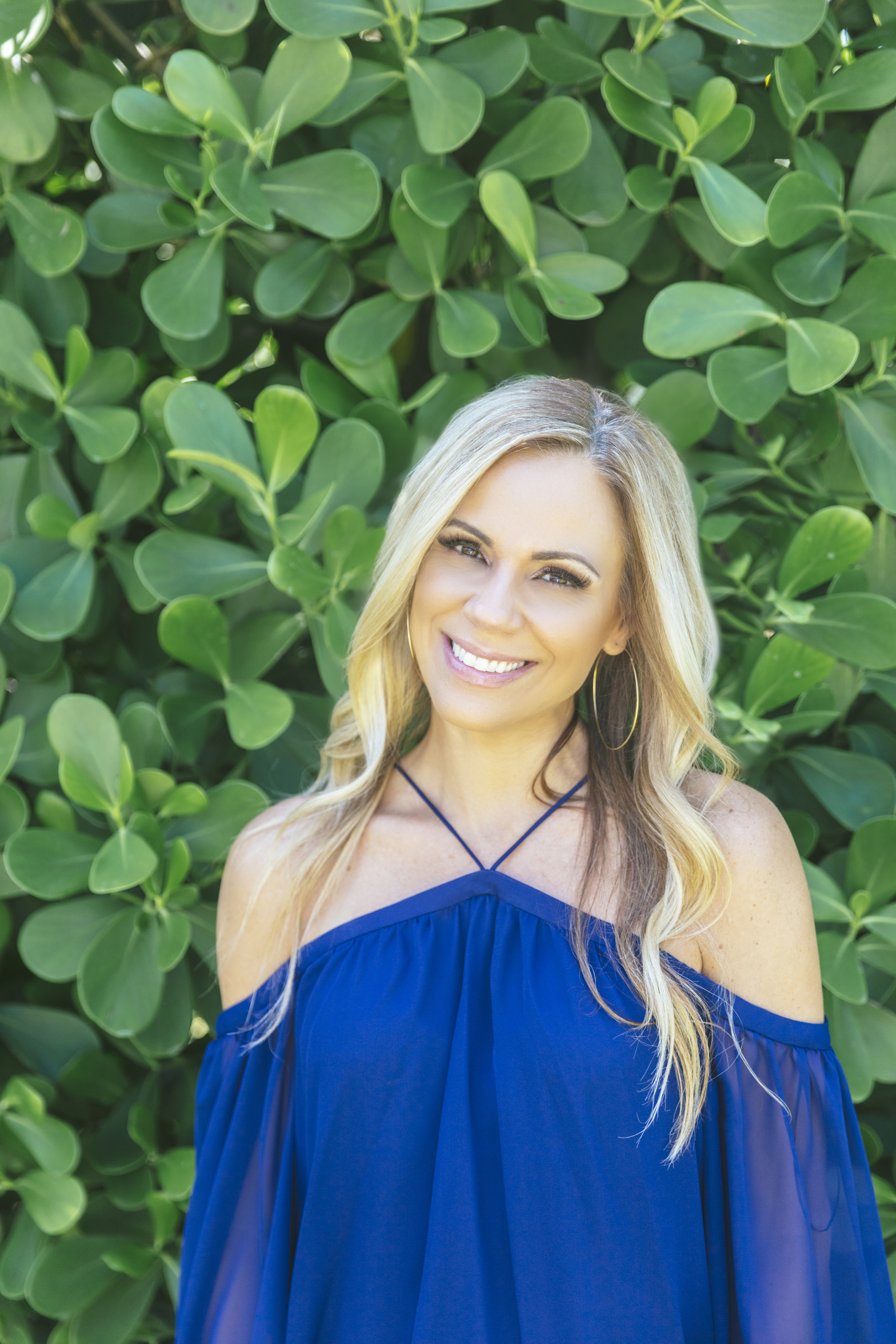
- Born: 1969 or 1970 (age 56–57); Connecticut, US
- Other name: Krista Alterman
- Education: University of Maine, The New School
- Occupations: Interior designer, television personality
- Television: Save My Bath; Splurge and Save
- Spouse: Eric Alterman
- Website: kristahome.com

Krista Watterworth Alterman is an American interior designer television personality who has hosted several HGTV shows such as Save My Bath (formerly Bad, Bad Bath) and Splurge and Save. She has also appeared as an interior design expert on the Food Network show Restaurant: Impossible and the DIY Network show The Vanilla Ice Project.

== History ==
Watterworth grew up in Southbury, Connecticut in an Italian-American family with four sisters. She was raised Catholic.

Watterworth completed her undergraduate studies at the University of Maine. In 2004, she graduated with a Master's in Fine Arts from The New School in Manhattan, paying for school by staging apartments for real estate agents in New York City. She later left law school for a modeling career.

She also attended the Parsons School of Design.

In 2010, Watterworth moved to Palm Beach Gardens, Florida, where she opened her own studio called KRISTA + HOME.

== Career ==
During college, Watterworth worked as a model over summer breaks.

As an actress, she had small roles on the soap operas All My Children and As the World Turns.

In 2006, Watterworth auditioned for HGTV's Save My Bath (formerly Bad, Bad Bath) and hosted the show for two years. She also hosted the HGTV show Splurge and Save and appeared on The Food Network's Restaurant: Impossible. Watterworth has worked regularly with Rob Van Winkle on his show The Vanilla Ice Project on DIY Network.

Her interior design work has been published in Architectural Digest, DECOR, and Florida Design. She has also designed her own line of tile.

In 2025, following its acquisition by Vesta Home Krista+Home expanded its service footprint to a global clientele, becoming a part of a broader luxury design offering under Vesta Home.

== Personal life ==
Watterworth married Eric Dwight Alterman in 2006. Alterman is the founder of KickApps and MeshNetworks. They live in Palm Beach Gardens, Florida, with their two children.

== Awards ==
- 2023 Seaglass Award, Best Renovation, Florida Design
- 2022 Best of Palm Beach-First Place, Home Decorating, Palm Beach Post
- 2022 Top 100 Women-Led Businesses in Florida, The Commonwealth Institute
- 2022 Best of Design, Interior Icons Modern Luxury Interiors
- 2021 Top Women-Led Business in Florida, The Commonwealth Institute
- 2021 Best of Palm Beach-Home Decorating, Palm Beach Post
- 2021 American Society of Interior Designers Design Excellence- First Place, Bathroom
- 2020 Luxe Red Awards – Regional Winner, Kitchen
- 2020 Luxe Red Awards – Regional Winner, Bathroom
- 2018 Luxe Red Awards – Regional Winner, Kitchen
- 2018 American Society of Interior Designers Design Excellence Crystal Award - Residential: Traditional Design over 3000 sf - First Place
- 2018 American Society of Interior Designers Design Excellence Crystal Award - Residential: Contemporary Design under 3000 sf - Honorable Mention
