= Fred Segal =

American retailer

- Industry: Lifestyle, retail
- Founded: 1961; 65 years ago
- Headquarters: Los Angeles, California, U.S.
- Number of locations: 1
- Area served: United States; Sunset Boulevard, Malibu
- Key people: Jeff Lotman (CEO and owner)
- Website: www.fredsegal.com

Fred Segal is an American clothing and accessories retail brand founded in 1961. In 2024, the brand announced it would close its online store and most of its physical retail stores. Aritzia announced its acquisition of the Fred Segal brand on February 19, 2026.

== Stores ==
There were six Fred Segal locations in the United States as of 2023. The main store was located on Sunset Boulevard in West Hollywood, with others in Malibu, Los Angeles, Larkspur and Las Vegas. Fred Segal's other international locations included three flagship stores in Daikanyama, Yokohama, and Kobe, Japan, one flagship store in Taipei, Taiwan, and one at Galleria Department Store in Seoul, South Korea.

== History ==
Over 65 years ago, Fred Segal opened a local jeans-only store called Pants America. This 300-square-foot store grew over the years, and with the move to Melrose Avenue in 1961, the name was changed to Fred Segal. Through Segal's ongoing acquisition of adjacent properties, it grew into a 29,000-square-foot, 102-parking-spot retail center. Segal invited key managers to purchase and run select boutiques within their respective areas of merchandising expertise within the Fred Segal center.

In May 2012, the worldwide brand licensing rights were acquired by Sandow Media; however, that transaction did not include the two retail centers at 8100 Melrose Avenue, which the family had sold more than a decade earlier, or the Santa Monica center, which closed in 2016. In late 2012, Sandow announced Fred Segal's expansion strategy to open new flagship locations both internationally and domestically, launch Fred Segal's first e-commerce site, and create private merchandise lines.

Under Sandow's ownership, a 2,000-square-foot Fred Segal store opened in the renovated Tom Bradley International Terminal at Los Angeles International Airport in 2013. In September 2017, Fred Segal opened their flagship store on the corner of Sunset and La Cienega in West Hollywood, California.

In March 2019, Fred Segal was bought by Global Icons. Evolution Media, an investment firm created by Creative Artists Agency and TPG Capital, will maintain a minority stake. The Segal family owns the Fred Segal trademark, with Global Icons licensing the trademark.

Fred Segal opened its store in Malibu in April 2019.

On February 25, 2021, Fred Segal died at 87 after complications from a stroke.

In early 2024, a sublicense was issued for a 4,000-square-foot Fred Segal Home furniture and accessories showroom at the HD Buttercup Design Center in Culver City. By July 2024, Fred Segal closed the last two of its five California stores – on Montana Avenue in Santa Monica; at The Shops at Sportsmen's Lodge in Studio City; at the Marin Country Mart in Larkspur; Malibu; and the flagship on Sunset Boulevard in West Hollywood – leaving only one retail outpost operating at Resorts World in Las Vegas, which closed in December 2024. The brand's online store was also shut down in July 2024.
