= Restaurant: Impossible =

American reality television series (2011–2023)

- Presented by: Robert Irvine
- Country of origin: United States
- Original language: English
- No. of seasons: 22
- No. of episodes: 191 (not counting specials, revisits, or Back in Business) (list of episodes)

Production
- Executive producers: Marc Summers; Robert Irvine; Brian Lando; Francesco Giuseppe Pace
- Producers: Cyndi Butz; Paul Perrymore; Jodi Goren-Rode
- Editors: John Gerbec; Bryan Monzella; Scott Markowitz; Mark Wawrzenski; Chip Schofield
- Running time: 42 minutes
- Production companies: Marc Summers Productions (seasons 1–13); Shooters TV (seasons 1–9); Alkemy X, Inc. (seasons 10–13); Lando Entertainment (seasons 14–22)

Original release
- Network: Food Network
- Release: January 19, 2011 – April 6, 2023

Related
- Dinner: Impossible; Hotel Impossible; Restaurant Impossible: Last Call

Restaurant: Impossible is an American reality television series featuring chef and restaurateur Robert Irvine, that originally aired on Food Network from 2011 to 2016. After a three-year hiatus, the show returned on April 20, 2019. It was announced that the show was canceled after 22 seasons in 2023.

A reboot, Restaurant Impossible: Last Call, premiered July 23, 2026, which features chef Aarón Sánchez and Canadian restaurateur Jen Agg. The series is a co-production with Food Network Canada; Irvine disproved of the revival as tarnishing the legacy of the original series, citing his lack of involvement due to Food Network wanting a new crew to primarily film the show in Canada.

== Show structure ==
The premise of the series is that within two days and on a materials budget of $10,000, Irvine renovates a failing American restaurant with the goal of helping to restore it to profitability and prominence. Irvine is assisted by an HGTV designer (usually Taniya Nayak, Cheryl Torrenueva or Lynn Kegan, but sometimes Vanessa DeLeon, Krista Watterworth, Yvette Irene or Nicole Faccuito), along with general contractor Tom Bury, who sometimes does double duty as both general contractor and designer. After assessing the problems with the restaurant, Irvine typically creates a plan for the new decor, oversees the refurbishment of the restaurant, calculates profitable food costs, reduces the number of items on the menu and improves the quality of the entrees, develops a promotional activity, educates or resolves conflicts for the restaurant's owners, or trains the staff, as needed for each restaurant. As of its final episode in April 2023, the show had completed missions in 42 states and the District of Columbia, excepting states of Alaska, Hawai'i, Iowa, Kansas, North Dakota, South Dakota, Utah and Vermont.

== Outcomes ==
The Food Network has tracked performance of the series in turning restaurants around. By 2015, all seven of the restaurants featured in the 2011 premiere season had closed. By 2018, 100 of the first 140 restaurants renovated had closed. Only one of the 29 restaurants visited in the 2022–2023 final season has closed, and one has been sold.

== Audience ==
On January 4, 2021, the show planned to move to Discovery+, with new episodes airing every Thursday. The move to the streaming platform was reversed in March 2021 due to negative viewer feedback, and episodes continued to premiere on Food Network.

== See also ==
- Designed to Sell – previous show starring Taniya Nayak and Lynn Kegan
- Dinner: Impossible – previous show starring Robert Irvine
