= Meredith Heron =

Canadian interior designer and television personality

- Occupation(s): Interior designer, entrepreneur, television host
- Television: Home and Garden Television; Restaurant Makeover; Design Match TV Show
- Website: Official website

Meredith Heron is a designer and television personality who lives and works in Toronto, Ontario, Canada.

Meredith has appeared as a host designer on Home and Garden Television's Love by Design and Design Match, and as a guest on House & Home. Most recently and notably, Meredith has appeared on many episodes of the Food Network's top rated show: Restaurant Makeover, which also airs on Fine Living in the United States.

== See also ==
- Restaurant Makeover
