= Cheryl Torrenueva =

Canadian designer

Cheryl Torrenueva is a Canadian designer, best known as a personality on television shows produced by HGTV Canada.

A graduate of Ryerson University, Torrenueva started in television as a contestant on Designer Superstar Challenge. Although she did not win, she was offered the opportunity to become a guest designer on Home to Go, and has since appeared on Rooms That Rock, Restaurant Makeover, Restaurant: Impossible and Colin and Justin's Home Heist.

In 2023, Cheryl Torrenueva, along with her husband Michael, launched NuevaRosa, whose principal aim is to show clients how to get the very best from the home space — and themselves.

In 2024, she published "I WANT THIS LIFE: A Self-Care Journal for Transformation," an 8-week, transformational journal designed to help cultivate self-love, inner strength, and lasting personal growth.
