= Material Bank =

American technology and logistics company

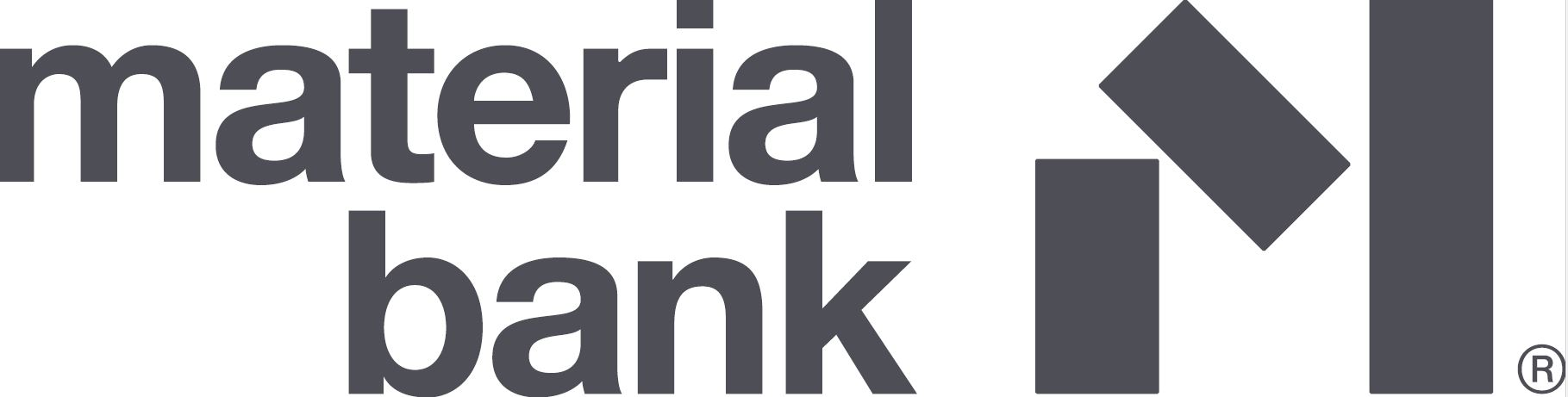
- Type: Private
- Industry: Technology; Logistics; Design; Architecture
- Founded: January 2019; 7 years ago in Boca Raton, Florida, U.S.
- Founders: Adam I. Sandow
- Headquarters: Boca Raton, Florida, U.S.
- Key people: Adam I. Sandow - CEO
- Services: Platform for searching and sampling architectural, design and construction materials
- Website: www.materialbank.com

Material Bank is an American technology and logistics company headquartered in Boca Raton, Florida, with its logistics hub in Olive Branch, Mississippi. The company provides a platform for searching and ordering free samples of architectural, construction, and design materials. Material Bank was founded by Adam I. Sandow to facilitate the overnight delivery of samples to the United States and Canada and connect manufacturers with architects and designers. As of May 2022, Material Bank has raised $325 million in funds and was valued at more than $1.9 billion.

== History ==
Material Bank was founded in January 2019 by Adam I. Sandow, who through his self-named company also owns several design and architectural media companies including Interior Design and Metropolis. Sandow was able to leverage his relationships within the architecture and design industry to attract both designers and brands for the Material Bank platform.

Before April 2020, Material Bank had raised $27 million in funds in previous rounds led by Raine Ventures and Starwood Capital Group. That month, it raised another $28 million in a Series B funding round led by Bain Capital Ventures, bringing Material Bank's total funding to $55 million. The company planned to use the new funding to build a new logistics facility and improve its online platform.

Material Bank initially operated an 80,000-square-foot (7,400 m^{2}) facility in Memphis, Tennessee, before the company moved to a new larger facility in Olive Branch, Mississippi, in February 2021. The company announced the conclusion of a new round of funding in May 2021. The Series C round was co-led by General Catalyst and Durable Capital Partners LP with participation from existing investors Bain Capital Venture and Raine Ventures and raised more than $100 million in additional funding. This brought the company's total funding to $157 million, and Material Bank was valued at $1 billion.

In August 2021, Material Bank acquired full ownership of Clippings, an interior design procurement platform with offices in London, England, and Sofia, Bulgaria. Clippings remains a separate platform. Material Bank also opened a facility near Charles de Gaulle Airport in Paris.

In March 2022, Material Bank acquired Amber Engine, a software company for product information management. Material Bank announced a $175-million Series D funding round in May 2022, bringing its total funding to more than $325 million. As of this funding round, the company was valued at $1.9 billion. In June 2022, the company acquired Architizer, an online forum for designers and architects.

== Operations ==
Material Bank is headquartered in Boca Raton, Florida. It has its approximately 380,000-square-foot (35,000 m^{2}) logistics facility in Olive Branch, Mississippi, located five miles from the FedEx Express World Hub at the Memphis International Airport. The location allows Material Bank to ship all packages via Priority Overnight to guarantee orders placed by midnight Eastern Time Zone are delivered by 10:30 a.m. the following day. From this facility, Material Bank is able to deliver to addresses in the United States and Canada. As of early 2021, the company uses 150 autonomous robots by Locus Robotics that work alongside more than 200 employees at its logistics facility.
