= David Adjey =

Canadian chef

- Education: Culinary Institute of America
- Culinary career
- Television shows
- Ready Set Cook, Restaurant Makeover, Iron Chef America, David Adjey's Restaurant 101, The Opener

David Adjey is a Canadian chef known for his appearances on the Food Network Canada shows Restaurant Makeover and The Opener.

Adjey appeared on the season 7 premiere episode of Iron Chef America which originally aired on October 5, 2008. He faced off against Iron Chef Michael Symon and the theme ingredient was sturgeon. Adjey and Symon fought to a 47-point tie/draw. He starred in Food Network Canada's Restaurant Makeover which ran from 2005 to 2008. Adjey stars in the Food Network Canada show, The Opener, which started in fall of 2010. He is the author of the New York Times best-seller Deconstructing the Dish. He also appeared on an episode of Kenny vs. Spenny cooking meat.

Adjey founded restaurant The Chickery in May 2012.

== Bibliography ==
- 1997 - Heart and soul cuisine from the estates of Sunnybrook, Sunnybrook Health Science Centre, 188 pages, ISBN 978-0-9681344-1-2
- 2007 - DeConstructing the Dish, modern day cuisine. by Whitecap publishers. 166 pages, ISBN 978-1-55285-897-4
