= Restaurant Makeover =

Canadian reality television series

- Starring: Chefs: Brad Long; Corbin Tomaszeski; David Adjey; Lynn Crawford; Massimo Capra; Michael Bonacini; Rene Chauvin; Susur Lee Designers: Cherie Nicole Stinson; Glen Peloso; Jessica Cotton; Meredith Heron; Robin De Groot; Tracy Kundell; Brenda Bent; Cheryl Torrenueva Foreman: Igor Shamraychuk
- Country of origin: Canada
- No. of seasons: 5
- No. of episodes: 68

Production
- Running time: 30 or 60 minutes (per episode)

Original release
- Network: Food Network Canada; HGTV Canada
- Release: October 2, 2005 – January 2008

Restaurant Makeover is a television series on HGTV Canada that currently airs as reruns on the Food Network Canada and HGTV Canada, as well as the Fine Living channel and Food Network in the United States, DTour and in over 16 other countries worldwide. The pilot episode starred designer Robin De Groot and chef Brad Long in the Coco's Cafe. Most of the restaurants involved in the series were located in the Greater Toronto Area. The series was rebooted as Restaurant Takeover on Food Network Canada and aired for 2 seasons in 2012 and 2013.

== Synopsis ==
It is hosted by chefs Brad Long, Rene Chauvin, Lynn Crawford, Massimo Capra, Corbin Tomaszeski, David Adjey, and Susur Lee along with designers Robin De Groot, Meredith Heron, Cherie Nicole Stinson, Jessica Cotton, Glen Peloso, Brenda Bent, Cheryl Torrenueva, Lisa North, and Jonathan Furlong, who perform renovation makeovers on restaurants desiring transformation.

The premise of the show is to challenge two restaurant professionals, one designer and one chef, to overhaul a struggling restaurant with a very limited budget and time. Originally the show would match funds provided by the restaurant owners up to $20,000; however, that decreased to just $15,000 as the show moved into its later seasons.

== Criticism ==
Although the show's premise is to help struggling restaurants, a number of establishments have failed shortly after their makeover — sometimes before the episode of the show featuring the restaurant had aired, thus not allowing them to reap the benefits of added exposure. Some critics held the opinion that participating in Restaurant Makeover was a "kiss of death" for failing restaurants. However, it was noted that given the dire condition of some participants' establishments, even a significant change could not salvage the business.

== List of renovated restaurants ==
=== Season 1 ===
Restaurant Name	Original Name	Location	Chef	Designer	Still Open?	Notes
Babelfish Bistro	N/A	Guelph, ON	David Adjey	Robin De Groot	No	
Cocoron	N/A	Toronto, ON	Via Oliveto	Rene Chauvin	No	

=== Season 2 ===
Restaurant Name	Original Name	Location	Chef	Designer	Still Open?	Notes
Aftermath Cafe	N/A	Toronto, ON	Lynn Crawford	Robin De Groot	No	Renamed "Events Cafe", then closed.
Bravi Restaurant	N/A	Toronto, ON	Massimo Capra	Glen Peloso	Yes	
College Street Bar	N/A	Toronto, ON	David Adjey	Robin De Groot	No	
First Class Delites	N/A	Toronto, ON	Lynn Crawford	Cherie Stinson	Yes	
High Point Restaurant	N/A	Mississauga, ON	David Adjey	Meredith Heron	No	
Higher Groundz Cafe	N/A	Mississauga, ON	Brad Long	Glen Peloso	No	Now Raw Aura Organic Cuisine.
Innocenti Restaurant	N/A	Toronto, ON	Lynn Crawford	Meredith Heron	No	Was KiWe, now Ruby Soho.
Monkey Bar and Grill	N/A	Toronto, ON	Lynn Crawford	Glen Peloso	Yes	Re-renovated in 2015.
Montana Roadhouse	N/A	Toronto, ON	David Adjey	Lisa North	No	Now The Ballroom.
Old York Bar and Grill	N/A	Toronto, ON	Massimo Capra	Cherie Stinson	No	Closed Dec 23, 2022.
Ossawippi Express Dining Cars	N/A	Orillia, ON	David Adjey	Robin De Groot	No	Owner declared bankruptcy in 2010.
The Empress Restaurant	N/A	Toronto, ON	Brad Long	Lisa North	Yes	
The Town Grill	N/A	Toronto, ON	Jason Rosso	Cherie Stinson	No	Now Omi Sushi.

=== Season 3 ===
Restaurant Name	Original Name	Location	Chef	Designer	Still Open?	Notes
Brooklyn's Bar and Grill	N/A	Burlington, ON	David Adjey	Robin De Groot	Yes	
Cafe Asia	N/A	Toronto, ON	Lynn Crawford	Cherie Stinson	No	
Casa Mendoza	N/A	Toronto, ON	Lynn Crawford	Matt Robinson	No	Following the demolition of the original structure, the site was cleared and developed into a condominium complex and the adjoining Silver Moon Drive.
Quattro 4 Ragazze	Europe Planet	Toronto, ON	Corbin Tomaszeski	Meredith Heron	Yes	
Forte Restaurant	N/A	N/A	Corbin Tomaszeski	Robin Fraser	No	
Grappa Ristorante	N/A	Toronto, ON	Brad Long	Robin Fraser / Meredith Heron	Yes	
Peridot Resto Lounge	Ithaca Restaurant	Toronto, ON	Brad Long	Meredith Heron	No	Closed in 2014, now Firkin on Bloor.
Jeremiah's Bullfrog Cafe	N/A	Toronto, ON	David Adjey	Jessica Cotton	No	
Karma's Cafe	N/A	Peterborough, ON	Lynn Crawford	Glen Peloso	Yes	
Kokkino Restaurant and Lounge	N/A	Toronto, ON	Lynn Crawford	Meredith Heron	No	Closed in 2010.
Latitude Wine Bar and Grill	N/A	Toronto, ON	David Adjey	Robin Fraser	No	
Le Cafe Vert	N/A	Toronto, ON	Massimo Capra	Cheryl Torrenueva	No	See Footnotes
Lüb Bistro Lounge	N/A	Toronto, ON	David Adjey	Glen Peloso	No	
Natchos Thai Thai Cafe	N/A	Toronto, ON	David Adjey	Meredith Heron	No	
Peroni's Pizzeria	N/A	Mississauga, ON	Massimo Capra	Glen Peloso	No	
Phil's Original BBQ	N/A	Toronto, ON	David Adjey	Meredith Heron	No	Closed in 2014, now Buster Rhino's Southern BBQ.
PJ O'Brien	N/A	St. Lawrence, Toronto, ON	Corbin Tomaszeski	Cherie Stinson	Yes	
Reliable Fish & Chips	N/A	Leslieville, Toronto, ON	Corbin Tomaszeski	Meredith Heron	Yes	
Rubicon Grill	N/A	Mississauga, ON	Lynn Crawford	Glen Peloso	No	Closure due to a fire.
Saigon Flower Restaurant	N/A	West Queen West, Toronto, ON	Corbin Tomaszeski	Jessica Cotton	Yes	
Side Door Grill	N/A	Toronto, ON	Lynn Crawford	Matt Robinson	No	
Six Steps	Spinello	Toronto, ON	Massimo Capra	Meredith Heron	No	Now The Bowery.
St. Clair Village Cafe	N/A	Toronto, ON	Massimo Capra	Cherie Stinson	Yes	Now Pizza e Pazzi.
Stoney's Bar & Grill	N/A	Toronto, ON	David Adjey	Glen Peloso	No	
The Boathouse Restaurant	N/A	Woodview, ON	Corbin Tomaszeski	Meredith Heron	No	
The Office Sports Bar and Grill	N/A	Toronto, ON	Corbin Tomaszeski	Meredith Heron	No	Now The Longest Yard.

=== Season 4 ===
Restaurant Name	Original Name	Location	Chef	Designer	Still Open?	Notes
Aggie Martin	N/A	Brampton, ON	David Adjey	Glen Peloso	No	Now Green Cup Roastery.
Bagel World	N/A	Toronto, ON	Corbin Tomaszeski	Robin Fraser	Yes	
Nook	Bakerberry Caffe	Toronto, ON	Corbin Tomaszeski	Jonathan Furlong	Yes	
Cork & Cabbage	Bistro Aubergine	Toronto, ON	Lynn Crawford	Cherie Stinson	No	Closed before the episode aired. Reopened under new ownership as JAM Cafe.
Bulldog Cafe	N/A	Toronto, ON	Massimo Capra	Meredith Heron	Yes	Has since expanded to multiple locations.
Calypso Hut	N/A	N/A	Massimo Capra	Robin Fraser	No	
Dhaba Indian Excellence	N/A	Toronto, ON	Susur Lee	Brenda Bent	Yes	
Konrad Lounge	Di and Gabby's	Etobicoke, Toronto, ON	Massimo Capra	Tracy Kundell	Yes	
Dooney's	N/A	Toronto, ON	Corbin Tomaszeski	Jonathan Furlong	Yes	See Footnotes
The Citizen	Essence	Toronto, ON	Lynn Crawford	Brenda Bent	Yes	This restaurant was purchased and renovated by Lynn Crawford and Cherie Stinson.
Golden Flame Restaurant	N/A	Richmond Hill, ON	Massimo Capra	Meredith Heron	No	Now The Meat Zone.
Hamar Weyne	N/A	Toronto, ON	Corbin Tomaszeski	Tracy Kundell	Yes	
Hollingers	N/A	Toronto, ON	Lynn Crawford	Cherie Stinson	No	
Hollywood Panini	N/A	Richmond Hill, ON	Massimo Capra	Glen Peloso	No	Now Greek Xpress.
Il Papagallo	N/A	Oakville, ON	Corbin Tomaszeski	Tracy Kundell	No	Now Corks Restaurant.
Jonathan's	N/A	Woodbridge, ON	David Adjey	Glen Peloso	Yes	
Kensington's	N/A	Toronto, ON	Brad Long	Glen Peloso	Yes	
La Cabana	N/A	N/A	David Adjey	Glen Peloso	No	
Massimo's	N/A	Toronto, ON	Massimo Capra	Brenda Bent	No	Was temporarily closed due to a fire. New locations on Queen West and also College were renamed Vinny Massimo's, but were closed around winter 2014.
The Olive Branch	Mighty Mike's	Toronto, ON	Lynn Crawford	Jonathan Furlong	Yes	
Rifca's Mediterranean Kitchen	Pita Stop	Richmond Hill, ON	Brad Long	Glen Peloso	No	Now Woody Wood Burgers.
Roma Ristorante	N/A	Toronto, ON	David Adjey	Cheryl Torrenueva	No	Under new ownership.
Flame Bar & Grill	Seashell Seafood	N/A	David Adjey	Cheryl Torrenueva	No	Now Pho 88.
The Central	N/A	N/A	Corbin Tomaszeski	Brenda Bent	Yes	
The Richmond Rogue	N/A	Toronto, ON	Lynn Crawford	Meredith Heron	No	
Waterfall Martini Lounge	N/A	N/A	David Adjey	Jonathan Furlong	No	

=== Season 5 ===
Restaurant Name	Original Name	Location	Chef	Designer	Still Open?	Notes
A Catered Affair's Cafe	N/A	Milton, ON	Lynn Crawford	Cherie Stinson	Yes	Now Grill Daddy.
Cocina Lucero	Arre Burrito	Toronto, ON	Lynn Crawford	Cherie Stinson	No	
Bacchus Roti	N/A	Toronto, ON	Brad Long	Meredith Heron	Yes	
Bon Vivant	N/A	Toronto, ON	Massimo Capra	Glen Peloso	No	Closed in 2013.
Church Street Diner	N/A	Toronto, ON	Lynn Crawford	Glen Peloso	No	For reasons which have never been publicly disclosed, the restaurant remained closed for over a year after the renovation before finally reopening in 2010. They have since closed the restaurant according to their Facebook page.
County Fish and Chips	N/A	Port Credit, ON	Corbin Tomaszeski	Meredith Heron	Yes	
De Great Iron Pot	N/A	Scarborough, ON	Corbin Tomaszeski	Cheryl Torrenueva	No	
Earth Indian	N/A	North York, ON	Brad Long	Jonathan Furlong	Yes	
Attilio's 1957	Gippino's	Toronto, ON	Michael Bonacini	Meredith Heron	No	Closed due to a fire.
Joe Boo's Cookoos	N/A	Thornhill, ON	Michael Bonacini	Glen Peloso	No	
Cluck, Grunt and Low	Riviera	Toronto, ON	Lynn Crawford	Brenda Bent	No	Now Puck 'N Wings.
Locavore	Slippery Boot	Toronto, ON	Brad Long	Meredith Heron	No	Became Trillium Bistro, now La Cascina.
Tresca Trattoria	N/A	Richmond Hill, ON	Corbin Tomaszeski	Tracy Kundell	No	Under new ownership, the restaurant was renamed Bathurst St. Deli, then later became Bathurst St. Bistro. It was subsequently sold and is now operating as Capital Pizzeria and Grill.
