= Brad Long (chef) =

Canadian chef

Brad Long is a Canadian chef. He is known for his appearances on the Food Network show Restaurant Makeover, which is seen in over 16 countries worldwide. For ten years Long worked at Maple Leaf Sports & Entertainment where he was responsible for feeding more than 20 million fans at Toronto's Air Canada Centre and BMO Field. His responsibilities included creating team meals for the organization's NBA and NHL teams; and overseeing quick service, catering and restaurants including The Platinum Club.

The Platinum Club won consecutive Wine Spectator Awards of Excellence every year since 2002; a VQA Restaurant Awards of Excellence; and the International Award of Excellence – Diamond Wine Award in 2004. Meanwhile, the Air Canada Club was ranked by Globe and Mail reviewer Joanne Kates as one of the top 10 restaurants of the year in its inaugural season. Long's previous culinary challenge was to rebuild the food and beverage program at the CN Tower in 1995, amassing several awards during his tenure. The aspiring chef started out in the early 1980s with stints at various restaurants across the country—mostly as a sideline to pay the bills while working as a musician.

In 1990 Long got serious about cooking and became entrenched at Toronto's Pronto Ristorante. While working up to Sous Chef and Chef, and attending school full-time, he studied and traveled extensively through Europe and the United States. Long developed the concept for the Restaurant and Bar called My Place, A Canadian Pub, located at Jane and Bloor in Toronto's West End. Starting in July 2011, Long was the owner and chef of Café Belong and Belong Catering at the Evergreen Brick Works. In 2022 Café Belong closed and Long relocated his work to Sharbot Lake, in the form of a new restaurant; Belong Sharbot Lake.

== See also ==
- Cuisine of Toronto
