= Adam Sandow =

American businessman

- Education: University of Miami
- Years active: 1994 – Present
- Title: Founder and chairman of Sandow; Chairman and CEO of Material Bank
- Term: 2019 – Present
- Website: sandow.com

Adam I. Sandow is an American businessman and entrepreneur. He is the founder and chairman of a self-named holding company, and the founder, chairman and CEO of Material Bank, an online platform for searching and sampling architectural, design and construction materials.

Sandow began his career in publishing, starting several media companies and publications, including NewBeauty and Luxe Interiors + Design. He acquired Interior Design, the finance magazine Worth, and the intellectual property of the clothing brand Fred Segal. In 2019, Sandow founded Material Bank and acquired Metropolis, an architecture and design magazine.

== Early life and education ==
Sandow grew up in Miami, Florida. He attended the University of Miami in nearby Coral Gables, Florida.

== Career ==
In 1994, Sandow started a publishing business and launched a national consumer magazine, Honeymoon. He sold this business in 1999. He later joined and served as principal of the Internet start-up and wedding media company The Knot. Sandow led The Knot to an IPO in 2000 before leaving to start his own company.

Sandow founded his eponymous company, stylized as SANDOW, in 2003. In 2005, he founded NewBeauty, a consumer magazine which publishes articles about beauty, ranging from products to cosmetic procedures. In that same year, Sandow started his company's second magazine, Luxe Interiors + Design, an architecture and design magazine focused on high-priced homes which had its first issue in June 2005. The magazine began with a Colorado edition but has expanded to a national edition, 14 regional editions, and 2 seasonal editions. In 2006, Sandow started TestTube, a beauty product sampling subscription program.

In 2008, SANDOW acquired finance magazine Worth from CurtCo Media. Sandow also started MediaJet, a network of newsstands at private jet terminals geared toward affluent consumers. In 2010, the company added design industry trade magazine Interior Design and the Furniture Today Group, purchased from Reed Business Information. In 2011, acquisitions included design and architecture magazine Surface, materials consultancy Material ConneXion, and creative management agency Culture + Commerce.

In 2012, Sandow acquired the intellectual property of the Los Angeles-based clothing brand Fred Segal. Sandow sold Furniture Today in 2013 to FT Media Holdings, Inc. In May 2014, Sandow brought in equity partner Evolution Media Partners, to license the Fred Segal brand to overseas retail stores, including several in Japan.

In summer 2014, Sandow introduced BeautyDNA, an online beauty product matching service. As of 2017, Sandow has offices in New York City and South Florida.

In December 2018, Sandow acquired Contract Consulting Group, a Chicago-based market research firm, which was renamed ThinkLab. In May 2019, Sandow was contracted to oversee the operations of NYCxDesign, New York's design week, beginning in 2020. In November 2019, Sandow acquired Metropolis, an architecture and design magazine.

Sandow founded Material Bank in January 2019 and serves as its chairman and CEO. The company provides an online platform to order free samples of architectural, design and construction materials. In August 2021, Material Bank acquired Clippings, an interior design procurement platform based in the UK and Bulgaria. The same year, Sandow received an Honorary Doctorate from the New York School of Interior Design.

In March 2022, Material Bank also acquired Amber Engine, a software company for product information management. As of May 2022, Material Bank has raised more than $325 million in funding and is valued at $1.9 billion. In June of the same year, Sandow completed the acquisition of Architizer, a New York digital media company.
