= Peter Fallico =

Peter Fallico is a Canadian designer and television personality, best known as a host of various programs on HGTV Canada. Originally a supporting craft and handyman on Style at Home, he subsequently became a cohost of This Small Space, as well as a set decorator for U8TV: The Lofters, and was first given his own show, Home to Go, in 2002. He has since hosted a number of other HGTV series, each based on the Home to... brand.

In the original Home to Go, he presents small-scale home improvement and design ideas for renters and other people who do not want to overinvest in improving homes they're not planning to live in permanently. In Home to Stay, he designs spaces for people who have purchased their first permanent home. In Home to Flip, he purchases an outdated and undervalued home, and presents the process of upgrading the home for eventual resale. In his most recent series, Home to Keep, he redesigns living spaces for established homeowners who have been considering moving because one or more spaces in their current home are no longer meeting their needs.

Fallico's design and hosting style incorporates do-it-yourself tips to reduce design and renovation costs. For example, he may demonstrate how to perform a simple upholstery project; how to create a custom piece of simple furniture, such as a coffee table or a storage nook, out of MDF or other casual building materials; or how to create unique and customized artwork out of craft pieces or found objects.

Fallico, who is gay, was also one of the participants in "It Gets Better Canada", a documentary video which interviewed numerous Canadian LGBT celebrities as part of the online It Gets Better Project.
