= List of Chopped episodes (seasons 21–40) =

This is the list of episodes (Seasons 21–40) for the Food Network competition reality series Chopped.

== Episodes ==
=== Season 21 (2014–15) ===
No. overall	No. in season	Title	Judges	Original release date
252	1	"Teen Tournament: Part One"	Marc Murphy, Amanda Freitag, and Geoffrey Zakarian	July 15, 2014
Ingredients: Appetizer: cherry drink soaked pickles, lamb loin chops, kale chips, ricotta salata; Entrée: mahi mahi, cookie snack chips, green beans, french fries; Dessert: gourmet frozen yogurt sundae, white balsamic vinegar, puffed rice cereal bars, dulce de leche; Contestants: Alexandria Brooks (age: 16), from Voorhees, NJ (eliminated after the appetizer); Ashley Dudley (age: 16), from Hancocks Bridge, NJ (eliminated after the entrée); Jay Ureña (age: 16), from Queens, NY (eliminated after the dessert); Jason Khaytin (age: 14), from Holland, PA (winner); Notes: Part one of five. Teenaged chefs competed in this tournament for a spot in the finale and a chance to win $25,000 and a $40,000 culinary school scholarship. During the tournament, chefs were given 30 minutes for the appetizer round, instead of the usual 20 minutes.
253	2	"Teen Tournament: Part Two"	Marc Murphy, Amanda Freitag, and Geoffrey Zakarian	July 22, 2014
Ingredients: Appetizer: jumbo shrimp, chunky peanut butter, jalapeños, sticky rice; Entrée: frog legs, mafaldine, bok choy, lobster mushrooms; Dessert: black and white cookies, fruit leather strips, cashews, agave nectar; Contestants: Mikayla Layng (age: 13), from Lynbrook, NY (eliminated after the appetizer); Eyan Goldman (age: 16), from New York, NY (eliminated after the entrée); Lucy Felong (age: 15), from Hightstown, NJ (eliminated after the dessert); Dante Foggy (age: 17), from Burlington Twp, NJ (winner); Notes: Part two of five.
254	3	"Teen Tournament: Part Three"	Chris Santos, Alex Guarnaschelli, and Alex Stupak	July 29, 2014
Ingredients: Appetizer: rabbit and ginger sausage, dandelion greens, dried currants, hot-sauce-flavored candy canes; Entrée: pineapple upside-down cake, Cornish hens, hen of the woods mushrooms, edamame hummus; Dessert: cinnamon cereal, pie crust, chocolate fudge sauce, grape carbonated candy; Contestants: Brandon Medley (age: 15), from Sewell, NJ (eliminated after the appetizer); Hannah Bukzin (age: 14), from Westport, CT (eliminated after the entrée); Max Aronson (age 16), from Woodcliff Lake, NJ (eliminated after the dessert); Tommi Rae Fowler (age: 16), from Townville, SC (winner); Notes: Part three of five.
255	4	"Teen Tournament: Part Four"	Chris Santos, Alex Guarnaschelli, and Alex Stupak	August 3, 2014
Ingredients: Appetizer: salsa verde, chicken breasts, bundled lunch kits, blue corn tortilla chips; Entrée: buffalo tenderloin, couscous, rainbow chard, squeezable blueberry yogurt; Dessert: chocolate Swiss rolls, popcorn balls, blackberries, gummy fish; Contestants: Antonio Jubela-Gordon (age: 16), from New York, NY (eliminated after the appetizer); Jake Diamond (age: 13), from Montclair, NJ (eliminated after the entrée); Morgan Goldstein (age: 14), from Cleveland, Ohio (eliminated after the dessert); Sequoia Pranger (age: 16), from Salem, Oregon (winner); Notes: Part four of five.
256	5	"Teen Tournament: Grand Finale"	Amanda Freitag, Alex Guarnaschelli, and Alex Stupak	August 12, 2014
Ingredients: Appetizer: octopus, purple cauliflower, kumquats, coconut caramel cookies; Entrée: antelope chops, red curry paste, rainbow carrots, ants on a log; Dessert: frozen mocha drink, Vacherin Mont d'Or cheese, jelly donuts, chocolate covered crickets; Contestants: Sequoia Pranger (age: 16), from Salem, Oregon (eliminated after the appetizer); Jason Khaytin (age: 14), from Holland, PA (eliminated after the entrée); Dante Foggy (age: 17), from Burlington Twp, NJ (eliminated after the dessert); Tommi Rae Fowler (age: 16), from Townville, SC (winner); Notes: Part five of five. The previous four winners competed for $25,000 and a $40,000 culinary school scholarship. All the other contestants received a $1,000 gift card to FoodNetwork.com. Four of the teen chefs that did not win this season's Teen Tournament would later return for a teen chef redemption episode in season 25 ('Teen Redeem'.
257	6	"Food Truck Fight"	Peter Oleyer, Amanda Freitag, and Scott Conant	August 19, 2014
Ingredients: Appetizer: strawberry shortcake ice cream bars, ground lamb, caviar, empanada dough; Entrée: whole suckling pig, red and white kabob sauces, corn tortillas, fiddlehead ferns; Dessert: Liège waffles, mangoes with spiced lime, Vietnamese iced coffee, flan; Contestants: Michael Natiello, Food Truck Owner from Bloomfield, NJ (eliminated after the appetizer); Han Ly Hwang, Former Food Truck Owner, from Portland, OR (eliminated after the entrée); James Klayman, Food Truck Owner from New York, NY (eliminated after the dessert); Nong Poonsukwattana, Food Truck Owner & Restaurateur from Portland, OR (winner); Notes: Contestants are chefs who operate food trucks and carts. The suckling pig in the entrée basket was precooked.
258	7	"Ultimate Champions: Professionals"	Marc Murphy, Chris Santos, and Scott Conant	August 26, 2014
Ingredients: Appetizer: eel, pepihuates, shaved coconut, sea beans; Entrée: dressed squab, stuffed grape leaves, feta cheese, cherry cola; Dessert: grasshopper pie, Granny Smith apples, smoked salt, puffed rice; Contestants: Fatima Ali (Episode 12.2 – "A Guts Reaction") and (Episode 14.3 – "Chopped Champions: Part 2") (eliminated after the appetizer); Lauren Kyles (Episode 18.11 – "Beer Here!") (eliminated after the entrée); Tom McKenna (Episode 16.4 – "Gyro We Go Again") (eliminated after the dessert); Giorgio Rapicavoli (Episode 10.3 – "Far Far Out!") (advances to final round) (winner); Notes: Part 1 of a 5-part tournament featuring 16 past champions(4 professional chefs and 12 amateur champions) divided into 4 divisions of 4 contestants. The winner of each preliminary round advanced to the finale, whey they competed for a grand prize of $50,000, plus a new car. All contestants are professional chefs who were Chopped champions from other episodes. Fatima Ali had competed 2 other times before this (Episode 12.3 – "A Guts Reaction") and (Episode 14.3 – "Chopped Champions: Part 2"). This episode had a 30-minute "Chopped: After Hours" special that aired directly after the episode, consisting of previously online clips where judges engaged in friendly pseudo competition tackling one of the round's basket ingredients. Giorgio forgot an ingredient in the appetizer round but the judges loved his dish so he moved on.
259	8	"Ultimate Champions: Amateur Champs"	Aarón Sánchez, Alex Guarnaschelli, and Scott Conant	September 2, 2014
Ingredients: Appetizer: cheese blintzes, salsa, poblano peppers, ground pork; Entrée: wagyu ribeye steak, jalapeño chips, pink pearl sedum, mangoes; Dessert: cookie spread, crème anglaise, grapefruit, microwaved mug cupcake; Contestants: Marisa Biaggi (Episode 15.6 – "Amazing Amateurs") (eliminated after the appetizer); Dinah Surh (Episode 19.1 – "Ambitious Amateurs") (eliminated after the entrée); Elda Bielanski (Episode 19.3 – "Grandma vs. Grandma") (eliminated after the dessert); Keith Young (Episode 19.13 – "Four Fathers") (advances to final round) (winner); Notes: Part 2 of 5. All contestants are Chopped champions from other episodes featuring amateur cooks.
260	9	"Ultimate Champions: Heroes"	Aarón Sánchez, Maneet Chauhan, and Chris Santos	September 9, 2014
Ingredients: Appetizer: sablefish, pineapple, fruit and nut bars, turnips; Entrée: rack of lamb, papaya, peppermint patties, spring garlic; Dessert: purple corn pudding, crystallized ginger, cinnamon spice coffee liqueur, pecans; Contestants: Richard Fields (Episode 18.5 – "Firefighter Chefs") (eliminated after the appetizer); Paul Rut (Episode 11.6 – "Sound the Alarm!") (eliminated after the entrée); Robbie Myers (Episode 15.8 – "Military Salute") (eliminated after the dessert); Diana Sabater (Episode 15.5 – "Momumental") (advances to final round) (winner); Notes: Part 3 of 5. All contestants are Chopped champions from other episodes featuring heroes(people who help others in some way). Two firefighters, a US army veteran, and a police officer are the hero contestants in this episode.
261	10	"Ultimate Champions: Celebrities"	Aarón Sánchez, Maneet Chauhan, and Marc Murphy	September 16, 2014
Ingredients: Appetizer: salmon fillets, avocados, sweet tea, cricket flour; Entrée: pork loin, cucumbers, black bean soup, chocolate body paint; Dessert: key lime juice, cream cheese, banana paste, ladyfingers; Contestants: Gillian Vigman (Episode 19.6 – "Chopped Tournament of Stars: Comedians!") and (Episode 19.8 – "Chopped Tournament of Stars: Finale") (eliminated after the appetizer); Brandi Chastain (Episode 19.4 – "Chopped Tournament of Stars: Sport Stars!") and (Episode 19.8 – "Chopped Tournament of Stars: Finale") (eliminated after the entrée); Carnie Wilson (Episode 19.5 – "Chopped Tournament of Stars: Rachel vs. Guy!") and (Episode 19.8 – "Chopped Tournament of Stars: Finale") (eliminated after the dessert); Laila Ali (Episode 14.12 – "Chopped All-Stars: Celebrities") and (Episode 14.13 – "Chopped All-Stars: Finale") (advances to final round) (winner); Notes: Part 4 of 5. All the chefs are celebrities who formerly competed on Chopped for charity, each being a finalist in the tournament they originally competed in. Brandi, Carnie, and Gillian had competed against each other before when they were finalists in Season 19's Tournament Of Stars. In round 2, Brandi forgot to plate sauce, which had chocolate body paint, a basket ingredient.
262	11	"Ultimate Champions: Grand Finale"	Scott Conant, Alex Guarnaschelli, and Geoffrey Zakarian	September 23, 2014
Ingredients: Appetizer: duck confit, orange cream ice pops, ramps, risotto; Entrée: pig's head, ajvar, vegetable steamed buns, Chinese broccoli; Dessert: corn muffin tops, whiskey, macadamia nuts, chocolate covered gummy bears; Contestants: Keith Young (Episode 19.13 – "Four Fathers") (eliminated after the appetizer); Laila Ali (Episode 14.12 – "Chopped All-Stars: Celebrities") and (Episode 14.13 – "Chopped All-Stars: Finale") (eliminated after the entrée); Giorgio Rapicavoli (Episode 10.3 – "Far Far Out!") (eliminated after the dessert); Diana Sabater (Episode 15.5 – "Momumental") (winner); Notes: Part 5 of 5. The 4 preliminary round winners were competing for a grand prize of $50,000, plus a new car of the winner's choice from Buick.
263	12	"Short Order Cooks"	Geoffrey Zakarian, Alex Guarnaschelli, and Scott Conant	September 30, 2014
Ingredients: Appetizer: ground beef, tomatoes, slider buns, cotton candy; Entrée: broccoli rabe, chicken tenders, baked pizza dough, sour gummy candies; Dessert: banana pudding, vanilla ice cream, icing, brownie mix; Contestants: Eitan Bernath (age: 11), from: Teaneck, NJ (eliminated after the appetizer); Christopher Pappas (age: 10), from: Long Island, NY (eliminated after the entrée); Mona Ziabari (age: 10), from: Lehigh Valley, PA (eliminated after the dessert); Lily Nichols (age: 11), from: Riverton, NJ (winner); Notes: The contestants in this special episode were children. Instead of the usual 20 minutes, they were given 30 minutes in the appetizer round. Due to the small height of the contestants, Ted had to help them reach for something at various times. This episode was dedicated to the memory of Lily Nichols' father, Jeffrey Nichols, who died just prior to the airing of this episode.
264	13	"Money Saver"	Geoffrey Zakarian, Alex Guarnaschelli, and Scott Conant	January 13, 2015
Ingredients: Appetizer: chickpeas, baby red mustard greens, marinara sauce, silken tofu; Entrée: ham steaks, lemon lime soda, cottage cheese, pea tendrils; Dessert: pound cake, chocolate chips, honey, strawberries; Contestants: Jun Robles, Chef de Cuisine from Portland, OR (eliminated after the appetizer); Christopher Arellanes, Chef de Partie from New York, NY (eliminated after the entrée); Alluette Jones-Smalls, Chef and Owner from Charleston, SC (eliminated after the dessert); Emily Chapman, Line Cook from New York, NY (winner); Notes: The basket ingredients all cost less than $10; contestants were limited to using two pantry shelves that were stocked with low-priced goods.

=== Season 22 (2014–15) ===
No. overall	No. in season	Title	Judges	Original release date
265	1	"Mummies and Gummies"	Amanda Freitag, Alex Guarnaschelli, and Aarón Sanchez	October 14, 2014
Ingredients: Appetizer: gummy rats, canned pumpkin, bitter melon, mummy dogs; Entrée: graveyard dirt pudding, beef hearts, gummy body parts, pigs ears; Dessert: witch's brew, blood oranges, blue cheese, pretzel spider webs; Contestants: Mark Murray, Private Chef from Stanford, CT (eliminated after the appetizer); Stephanie Mishoe, Pastry Chef from Charleston, SC (eliminated after the entrée); TK Kyle, Caterer from Queens, NY (eliminated after the dessert); Roro Morales, Caterer from Portland, OR (winner); Notes: This was a Halloween episode. The graveyard dirt pudding in the entree round was crumbled chocolate cake "dirt" over whipped cream with white wafer cookie "headstones" on top. The witch's brew in the dessert round was made from: limeade, ginger ale and lime sorbet.
266	2	"Chopped Family Thanksgiving"	Aarón Sanchez, Amanda Freitag, Geoffrey Zakarian, and Scott Conant	November 11, 2014
Ingredients: Appetizer: smoked turkey legs, hominy, corn bread, gummy turkey feet; Entrée: brined turkey breast, savoy cabbage, corn casserole, boniato sweet potatoes; Dessert: pumpkin pie flavored vodka, cranberry pie, turkey fat, mashed potatoes; Contestants: Maneet Chauhan (eliminated after the appetizer); Marc Murphy (eliminated after the entrée); Chris Santos (eliminated after the dessert); Alex Guarnaschelli (winner); Notes: This was a special Thanksgiving episode where the Chopped judges played to win money for the charity No Kid Hungry. This is the first episode to have four judges on the judging panel instead of the usual three so the contestants had to make five plates instead of the usual four.
267	3	"Meatball Madness"	Michael Chernow, Aarón Sanchez, and Geoffrey Zakarian	December 2, 2014
Ingredients: Appetizer: lamb shanks, creme brûlée, ginger, baby leeks; Entrée: boar shoulder, etouffée sauce, bacon, okra; Dessert: chocolate ravioli, strawberry syrup, candied orange zest, French vanilla cake mix; Contestants: Mirna Attar, Chef & Restaurateur from Portland, OR (eliminated after the appetizer); Eva Winans, Line Cook from Charleston, SC (eliminated after the entrée); Zachary Kell, Sous Chef from New York, NY (eliminated after the dessert); Giuseppe Fanelli, Executive Chef from New York, NY (winner); Notes: The chefs were required to make meatballs in every course. Each chef was provided with a meat grinder on their station. Each round lasted its usual time limit but when this episode's first basket was used for Chopped After Hours, the time limit was increased to 30 minutes. Chef Giuseppe forgot the ginger in round 1, but moved on because the judges were thoroughly unimpressed with Chef Mirna's dish.
268	4	"The Holiday Kitchen"	Maneet Chauhan, Alex Guarnaschelli, and Geoffrey Zakarian	December 9, 2014
Ingredients: Appetizer: marron glacés, prosecco, challah bread, seafood salad; Entrée: Yule log, brisket, baked potato, mulled wine; Dessert: cookie dough in a press, peppermint candies, candied nuts, royal icing; Contestants: Sunny Anderson (eliminated after the appetizer); Jeff Mauro (eliminated after the entrée); Marcela Valladolid (eliminated after the dessert); Katie Lee (winner); Notes: This was a holiday themed episode featuring four of the hosts of The Kitchen as contestants, playing for charity. All the contestants, except Katie Lee, had competed before on Chopped. All four contestants received donations for their charities, win or lose.
269	5	"Family Food Fight"	Aarón Sanchez, Geoffrey Zakarian, and Chris Santos	December 23, 2014
Ingredients: Appetizer: piadina, purple malabar spinach, preserved lemon, veal cutlet; Entrée: branzino, French green lentils, firm tofu, mostarda; Dessert: lobster tail pastries, cinnamon chips, star anise, hazelnut liqueur; Contestants: Raphael Martone (father), Chef from Boston, MA (eliminated after the appetizer); John Martone (son), Chef & Co-Owner from Boston, MA (eliminated after the entrée); Rosie Martone (daughter), Head Chef & Co-Owner from Boston, MA (eliminated after the dessert); Geraldine Martone (mother), Chef from Boston, MA (winner); Notes: The contestants were a mother, father, daughter, and son who ran a restaurant together, competing head to head.
270	6	"Bizarre Baskets"	Andrew Zimmern, Aarón Sanchez, and Geoffrey Zakarian	January 20, 2015
Ingredients: Appetizer: lox ice cream, wasabi microgreens, pink asparagus, ground camel; Entrée: kholodets, flaming shiso, blue foot mushrooms, goat head; Dessert: unlaid chicken eggs, sour cream, rambutan, Turkish tavuk gogsu; Contestants: Nico Romo, Culinary Director & French Master Chef from Charleston, SC (eliminated after the appetizer); Geoff Rhyne, Chef de Cuisine from Charleston, SC (eliminated after the entrée); Aaron Barnett, Chef & Restaurateur from Portland, OR (eliminated after the dessert); Timothy Peterson, Sous Chef from New York, NY (winner); Notes: Judge Andrew Zimmern is the host of Travel Channel's Bizarre Foods with Andrew Zimmern. All baskets in this episode featured highly unusual, "bizarre foods". Chef Timothy worked at Beauty & Essex, which is run by Chopped judge Chris Santos. In the first round Chef Nico was eliminated after leaving his lox ice cream in the freezer and forgetting to plate it.
271	7	"Reality TV Stars"	Amanda Freitag, Alex Guarnaschelli, and Scott Conant	February 17, 2015
Ingredients: Appetizer: smoked mozzarella, endive, biscuit dough, pheasant terrine; Entrée: lobster, dinosaur kale, vegetable cream cheese, quinoa; Dessert: cannoli shells, marshmallows, chocolate sauce, cherry pie filling; Contestants: Kathy Wakile (The Real Housewives of New Jersey) (eliminated after the appetizer); Renee Graziano (Mob Wives) (eliminated after the entrée); Amy Roloff (Little People, Big World) (eliminated after the dessert); Travis Loftland (Deadliest Catch) (winner); Notes: The contestants were all reality television stars and competed for charity.
272	8	"Late Night Food Brawl"	Aarón Sanchez, Amanda Freitag, and Scott Conant	February 24, 2015
Ingredients: Appetizer: Italian sausages in buns, tomatillos, morel mushrooms, poutine; Entrée: fast food sliders, Belgian style stout beer, Japanese eggplant, Mexican corn; Dessert: rice and cheese burrito, chocolate milk, apple pie, whipped cream; Contestants: Maria Ojala, Private Chef from Bel-Air, CA (eliminated after the appetizer); Ryan Whyte, Sous Chef from Portland, OR (eliminated after the entrée); Anastacia Song, Sous Chef from Manhattan, NY (eliminated after the dessert); Adam Greenberg, Corporate Executive Chef from Norwalk, CT (winner); Notes: The basket theme for this episode was late night foods.
273	9	"Amateurs' Brawl"	Chris Santos, Maneet Chauhan, and Scott Conant	April 7, 2015
Ingredients: Appetizer: chicken truffle sausage, pecorino, banana peppers, spinach vinaigrette; Entrée: wild boar roast, katsu sauce, pattypan squash, caperberries; Dessert: marshmallow chocolate cookies, strawberry jam, hot sauce, cottage cheese; Contestants: Gregory Generet, Jazz Vocalist from New York, NY (eliminated after the appetizer); Marilyn Mansfield, Doll Maker from Staten Island, NY (eliminated after the entrée); Melissa Naccarato, Hairdresser from Long Island, NY (eliminated after the dessert); Drew Magary, Writer from New York, NY (winner); Notes: The contestants were all home cooks. Drew Magary, a science fiction novelist and humor columnist for the sports website Deadspin, had previously posted a satirical application for the show in 2012.
274	10	"Fabulous Baker Boys"	Christina Tosi, Amanda Freitag, and Scott Conant	April 21, 2015
Ingredients: Appetizer: focaccia dough, black cod, miso paste, rice pudding; Entrée: puffed pastry dough, chateaubriand, chicken liver, champagne chocolate truffles; Dessert: pâte à choux, marzipan oranges, gold leaf, candied crabs; Contestants: Kamel Saci, Head Bread Baker from New York, NY (eliminated after the appetizer); Frederick Aquino, Executive Pastry Chef from New York, NY (eliminated after the entrée); Mario Bacherini, Chef Technician from New York, NY (eliminated after the dessert); Thiago Silva, Executive Pastry Chef from New York, NY (winner); Notes: All chefs in this episode were male bakers and/or pastry chefs. The chefs wore Chopped T-shirts and aprons rather than the traditional chef's coats. They were required to bake something in each round, with each basket containing a type of baking dough. The chefs had 30 minutes in the appetizer round instead of 20 due to the extra time needed for baking.
275	11	"Hot Stuff"	Michelle Bernstein, Geoffrey Zakarian, and Aarón Sanchez	June 2, 2015
Ingredients: Appetizer: tom yum soup, goats milk yogurt, pork ribs, habanero peppers; Entrée: vindaloo sauce, hearts of palm, monkfish, ghost pepper beef jerky; Dessert: devil's tres leches cake, pink lemons, canary melon, chili pepper honey; Contestants: Mei Chau, Chef & Restaurateur from New York, NY (eliminated after the appetizer); Andrew Garrett, Hot Sauce Entrepreneur from Portland, OR (eliminated after the entrée); Denzil Richards, Executive Chef from New Rochelle, NY (eliminated after the dessert); Meny Vaknin, Executive Chef from Brooklyn, NY (winner); Notes: The baskets featured spicy ingredients in every round.
276	12	"Thrill of the Grill"	Elizabeth Karmel, Maneet Chauhan, and Marc Murphy	June 23, 2015
Ingredients: Appetizer: swordfish, watermelon, wine coolers, potato skins; Entrée: taramosalata, hanger steak, portobello mushrooms, fava beans; Dessert: peaches, lemonade, pound cake, piloncillo; Contestants: Jason French, Chef and Owner from Portland, OR (eliminated after the appetizer); Tonya Mitchell, Culinary Director from Charleston, SC (eliminated after the entrée); Timothy Witcher, Culinary Arts Instructor from Westhampton, NJ (eliminated after the dessert); Ben Bettinger, Executive Chef from Portland, OR (winner); Notes: Contestants were required to use the grill each round and could not use the ovens. Chef Timothy Witcher was the teacher of Dante Foggy, runner-up of the 2014 Chopped Teen Tournament. Chef Jason and Chef Ben knew each other prior to this episode, Jason being Ben's boss at one point.
277	13	"Scoops On!"	Natasha Case, Scott Conant, and Chris Santos	June 30, 2015
Ingredients: Appetizer: ginger ice cream in cones, English peas, halibut fillets, faloodeh; Entrée: asiago cheese, flank steak, Italian hot peppers, olive oil ice cream; Dessert: banana splits with palm sugar ice cream, white chocolate, red olives, milky raw sake; Contestants: Clio Goodman, Chef & Owner from New York, NY (eliminated after the appetizer); Chris Starkus, Chef de Cuisine from Portland, OR (eliminated after the entrée); Emmanuel Delcour, Private Chef & Fitness Expert from Beverly Hills, CA (eliminated after the dessert); Stacey Givens, Chef & Restaurateur from Portland, OR (winner); Notes: The baskets in each round contained ice cream and each chef was provided with a tray of assorted toppings. An extra ice cream machine was brought in so that both chefs could each make ice cream in the dessert round. In round 3, Chef Emmanuel forgot to plate his white chocolate and red olives.

=== Season 23 (2014–15) ===
No. overall	No. in season	Title	Judges	Original release date
278	1	"Every 'Wich Way"	Jeff Mauro, Amanda Freitag, and Chris Santos	December 16, 2014
Ingredients: Appetizer: polenta log, braised beef brisket, araucana eggs, tomatillos; Entrée: pâté, mango licorice, thousand island dressing, pork shoulder; Dessert: peanut butter and jelly sandwiches, marshmallow spread, Thai curry paste, chocolate covered espresso beans; Contestants: Leigh Ann Kato, Freelance Chef from Los Angeles, CA (eliminated after the appetizer); Susie Blue McWilliam, Chef & Owner from Portland, OR (eliminated after the entrée); Josh Lewis, Head Chef from New York, NY (eliminated after the dessert); Daniel Sharp, Executive Chef from New York, NY (winner); Notes: Contestants were required to make a sandwich for every course. In round 1, Chefs Susie Blue and Leigh Ann omitted a basket ingredient; Susie Blue used regular eggs instead of the basket eggs, while Leigh Ann chose not to plate her polenta. Chef Daniel is the brother of actress Lela Loren.
279	2	"Viewers' Choice Ingredients"	Amanda Freitag, Alex Guarnaschelli, and Scott Conant	January 6, 2015
Ingredients: Appetizer: pickled eggs, ramps, instant ramen noodles, calf eyeballs; Entrée: beef tongue, chimichurri sauce, shiitake mushrooms, boxed mac and cheese; Dessert: pig skin, baby food, margherita pizza, ostrich egg; Contestants: Victoria Neikirk, Executive Chefs from Charleston, SC (eliminated after the appetizer); Tynan Gibson, Chef de Cuisine from Portland, OR (eliminated after the entrée); Emily Hahn, Executive Chef from Charleston, SC (eliminated after the dessert); Vandy Vanderwarker, Sous Chef from Charleston, SC (winner); Notes: This was a viewers' choice episode. The basket ingredients were chosen by fans via social media. The first round was from Twitter; the second from Facebook; and the third from Instagram. Chef Emily and Chef Vandy were in a relationship prior to competing on this episode.
280	3	"Chopped Again!"	Marc Murphy, Maneet Chauhan, and Chris Santos	January 27, 2015
Ingredients: Appetizer: skate wings, pomegranate molasses, purple asparagus, candied sardines; Entrée: whole chicken legs, baby zucchini, wine ice cream, spotted dick pudding; Dessert: tortenboden, cocoa hazelnut spread, mirin, beer salt; Contestants: Angela Majko (Episode 15.4 – "Without Missing a Beet") (eliminated after the appetizer); Han Ly Hwang (Episode 21.6 – "Food Truck Fight") (eliminated after the entrée); Brandon Frohne (Episode 20.1 – "Dread and Breakfast") (eliminated after the dessert); Bradley Stellings (Episode 18.11 – "Beer Here!") (winner); Notes: All contestants were chefs who had unsuccessfully competed in previous episodes looking for redemption.
281	4	"Say Cheese!"	Adam Moskowitz, Amanda Freitag, and Alex Stupak	February 3, 2015
Ingredients: Appetizer: domed goat cheese, blue cheese, mostarda, guanciale; Entrée: raclette, brie, chicken thighs, garlic scapes; Dessert: manchego, garrotxa cheese, fig spread, tarragon; Contestants: Dung Trinh, Chef from Brooklyn, NY (eliminated after the appetizer); Christian Fischhuber, Chef de Cuisine from New York, NY (eliminated after the entrée); Jose Chesa, Chef & Restaurateur from Portland, OR (eliminated after the dessert); Maurizio Crescenzo, Chef & Restaurateur from New York, NY (winner); Notes: This episode's theme was cheese in every round (with 2 types of cheese in every basket). All 4 chefs were men.
282	5	"Chocolate Rush!"	Aarón Sanchez, Christina Tosi, and Marc Murphy	February 10, 2015
Ingredients: Appetizer: chocolate stout, white chocolate, pork chops, malted milk powder; Entrée: tortilla lime chocolate bars, dark chocolate, deckle of beef, naranjillas in syrup; Dessert: chocolate chile liqueur, milk chocolate, graham crackers, toasted coconut flakes; Contestants: Kelly Kleisner, Executive Pastry Chef from Charleston, SC (eliminated after the appetizer); Einav Gefen, Corporate Chef from Englewood Cliffs, NJ (eliminated after the entrée); Megan Vargas, Pastry Chef from Portland, OR (eliminated after the dessert); Mindy Simmons, Owner & Pastry Chef from Beaverton, OR (winner); Notes: This episode's theme was chocolate in every round (with 2 types of chocolate in every basket). All 4 chefs were women.
283	6	"Double Trouble"	Aarón Sánchez, Alex Guarnaschelli, and Scott Conant	March 3, 2015
Ingredients: Appetizer: date vinegar, rocky mountain oysters, daikon radish, chili roasted peas; Entrée: soft shell crab, passion fruit, canned beets, sweet potato patties; Dessert: port wine, crème fraiche, Canadian bacon, lollipop rings; Contestants: Kimberly Maisey and Justin Maisey, Spa Chefs from Tucson, AZ (eliminated after the appetizer); Jen Catron and Paul Outlaw, Food Truck Owners from New York, NY (eliminated after the entrée); Jon Cano and Elizabeth Gribko, Chef & Pastry Chef from East Massapequa, NY (eliminated after the dessert); Adam Sappington and Jackie Sappington, Chef & Pastry Chef from Portland, OR (winner); Notes: The contestants were all couples: engaged and married. This marks the first instance where more than four contestants competed at a time.
284	7	"T.G.I. Fry-Day"	Marc Murphy, Chris Santos, and Scott Conant	March 10, 2015
Ingredients: Appetizer: buckwheat honey, hot dogs, taro root, beef fat; Entrée: cube steak, pickled green tomatoes, chocolate sandwich cookies, duck fat; Dessert: serrano peppers, salted caramel sauce, gooey butter cake, coconut oil; Contestants: Fred Neuville, Chef & Restaurateur from John's Island, SC (eliminated after the appetizer); Catherine Cosby, Executive Chef from Summerville, SC (eliminated after the entrée); Anh Luu, Head Chef from Portland, OR (eliminated after the dessert); Mo Major, Sous Chef from Port Chester, NY (winner); Notes: The contestants were required to fry something in every round. In addition to the deep fryer, each chef was provided with a pot of oil preheated to frying temperature at the start of each round. Chef Catherine forgot an ingredient in both Round 1 and Round 2 resulting in her elimination.
285	8	"Amateurs Redemption"	Marc Murphy, Alex Guarnaschelli, and Chris Santos	March 17, 2015
Ingredients: Appetizer: vegan roast, Japanese mayo, purple kohlrabi, almonds; Entrée: quail, chermoula, cousa squash, cinnamon sugar cereal; Dessert: ricotta cheese, maple bacon lollipops, wonton wrappers, baharat; Contestants: Rique Uresti (Episode 15.6 – "Amazing Amateurs") (eliminated after the appetizer); Tommy Werther (Episode 19.1 – "Ambitious Amateurs") (eliminated after the entrée); Sunny Hostin (Episode 19.10 – "Mother's Day") (eliminated after the dessert); Jackie Khanich (Episode 19.1 – "Ambitious Amateurs") (winner); Notes: The contestants were home cooks who had all competed previously and lost. Tommy Werther and Jackie Khanich had previously competed against each other in the same episode. In round 3, Sunny forgot to plate an ingredient (baharat).
286	9	"Let's Do Lunch"	Aarón Sánchez, Amanda Freitag, and Marc Murphy	March 24, 2015
Ingredients: Appetizer: cinnamon rolls, Turkish coffee, quail eggs, tamarillos; Entrée: duck breast, artichoke, champagne, peanut butter and jelly; Dessert: pork crown roast, green lipped mussels, creamed spinach, truffles; Contestants: Mark Mata, Executive Chef from New York, NY (eliminated after the appetizer); Sarah Arkwright, Food Truck Owner from Portland, OR (eliminated after the entrée); Diane Vista-Wayne, Line Cook from New York, NY (eliminated after the dessert); Jonathan Kavourakis, Sous Chef from New York, NY (winner); Notes: The three rounds (appetizer, entrée, and dessert) were replaced by breakfast, lunch, and dinner, respectively. Chef Kavourakis worked at Beauty & Essex, which is run by Chopped judge Chris Santos.
287	10	"Fake Cake, Real Stakes"	Marc Murphy, Maneet Chauhan, and Chris Santos	March 31, 2015
Ingredients: Appetizer: chicken wings (puffed rice treats with hot sauce), Italian sausage, caramel apple (caramel coated onion), sheep (cauliflower and olive); Entrée: layer cake (meatloaf with cream cheese), spaghetti squash, green beans (fondant), ice cream sundae (mashed potatoes and gravy); Dessert: grilled cheese (pound cake with frosting), milk (buttermilk), peas and carrots (candy), tomato soup (strawberry soup); Contestants: Lauren Miller, Executive Chef, Sasquatch Brewing Co., Portland, OR (eliminated after the appetizer); Daniel Doyle, Executive Chef, Poogan's Porch, Charleston, SC (eliminated after the entrée); Cole Poolaw, Executive Chef, Barsa Tapas Lounge, Charleston, SC (eliminated after the dessert); Silvia Baldini, Chef & Caterer, Strawberry & Sage, New Canaan, CT (winner); Notes: This was an April Fools' Day competition where the ingredients in the baskets were actually something else in disguise and small pranks were pulled (e.g. hiding a rubber snake in a blender; having someone in a bear costume waiting in the break room between rounds.)
288	11	"First Responders"	Maneet Chauhan, Amanda Freitag, and Chris Santos	April 14, 2015
Ingredients: Appetizer: mixed berry jam, ground bison, arugula, hummus chips; Entrée: rotisserie chicken, fiery jaw breakers, fingerling potatoes, tequila; Dessert: passion fruit, angel food cake, toasted marshmallows, fruit ring candies; Contestants: Ariella Dalfen, North Shore LIJ Paramedic from Queens, NY (eliminated after the appetizer); Jing Cong, FDNY Paramedic Lieutenant from Manhattan, NY (eliminated after the entrée); Richard Henderson, NYPD Bomb Squad Detective from New York, NY (eliminated after the dessert); Anna Serrano, NYPD Police Sergeant from New York, NY (winner); Notes: Contestants were first responders such as police and paramedics.
289	12	"Judges' Face-Off"	Chris Santos, Maneet Chauhan, and Geoffrey Zakarian	June 9, 2015
Ingredients: Appetizer: tuna noodle casserole, Tex-Mex condiments, barbecue potato chips, collard greens; Entrée: tomato soup, pulled pork sandwich, dirty rice, peanuts; Dessert: cheddar biscuits, apple slices, carrot cake, mango chutney; Contestants: Amanda Freitag (Charity: God's Love We Deliver) (eliminated after the appetizer); Marc Murphy (Charity: No Kid Hungry) (eliminated after the entrée); Alex Guarnaschelli (Charity: Alex's Lemonade Stand) (eliminated after the dessert); Aarón Sánchez (Charity: WhyHunger) (winner); Notes: The theme of this episode was leftovers in every basket. All contestants were 'Chopped' judges who were competing for charity. The Tex-Mex condiments consisted of guacamole, salsa, and sour cream.
290	13	"Big Barbecue Bout"	Alex Guarnaschelli, Aarón Sánchez, and Ray Lampe	June 16, 2015
Ingredients: Appetizer: South Carolina style barbecue sauce, jumbo shrimp, baby mustard greens, clams; Entrée: North Carolina style barbecue sauce, pork spare ribs, rainbow chard, avocados; Dessert: Kansas City style barbecue sauce, bananas, whole coconut, smoked almonds; Contestants: Jimi Hyatt, Chef from Charleston, SC (eliminated after the appetizer); Heather Edwards, Executive Chef from Charleston, SC (eliminated after the entrée); Deljuan Murphy, Executive Sous Chef from Charleston, SC (eliminated after the dessert); Taylor Garrigan, Executive Chef from Charleston, SC (winner); Notes: This was a barbecue themed episode with a different regional variety of barbecue sauce in every basket. All the chefs were from different areas of Charleston, South Carolina, and the third judge, Ray "Dr. BBQ" Lampe, was a finalist in the first Chopped: Grill Masters Tournament. Due to the extensive time required to cook ribs, the ribs in the entree basket were pre-roasted.

=== Season 24 (2015) ===
No. overall	No. in season	Title	Judges	Original release date
291	1	"All Stars Tournament: Part 1"	Amanda Freitag, Maneet Chauhan, and Scott Conant	April 28, 2015
Ingredients: Appetizer: smoked pork tails, culantro, nattō, clams; Entrée: shrimp skin, hamachi, pomelo, green garlic; Dessert: maple smoked cheddar cheese, almond flour, mayonnaise, dates; Contestants: Brian Malarkey, Charity: Chimps Inc. (eliminated after the appetizer); Madison Cowan, Charity: Alzheimer's Association, New York City Chapter (eliminated after the entrée); Eric Greenspan, Charity: Stu and the Kids (eliminated after the dessert); Art Smith, Charity: Reunion (winner); Notes: The first in a five-part All-Stars tournament series, where the winner takes home $75,000 for a charity of their choice. Madison Cowan had previously won the 2010 Champions tournament. Chef Cowan is also the first chef to have competed as both a civilian and celebrity contestant.
292	2	"All Stars Tournament: Part 2"	Marc Murphy, Alex Guarnaschelli, and Chris Santos	May 5, 2015
Ingredients: Appetizer: Solomillo iberico, preserved lemons, arugula, peanut soup; Entrée: veal sweetbreads, fondue cheese, green chili sauce, artichokes; Dessert: switchel, lime leaves, meringue cookies, baked sweet potatoes; Contestants: Dale Talde, Charity: CARE USA (eliminated after the appetizer); Mary Sue Milliken, Charity: No Kid Hungry (eliminated after the entrée); Hung Huynh, Charity: Sunflower Mission (eliminated after the dessert); Anne Burrell, Charity: Juvenile Diabetes Research Foundation (winner); Notes: Part two of a five-part All-Stars tournament. Anne Burrell was a preliminary round winner in the 2011 All-Stars tournament.
293	3	"All Stars Tournament: Part 3"	Aarón Sanchez, Alex Guarnaschelli, and Geoffrey Zakarian	May 12, 2015
Ingredients: Appetizer: baby zucchini, marcona almonds, mojama, coconut macaroons; Entrée: lamb ribs, kumquats, variegated radicchio, cherry spoon fruit; Dessert: ghee, msemen, walnuts, orange flavored water; Contestants: Marcel Vigneron, Charity: L.A. Kitchen (eliminated after the appetizer); Cat Cora, Charity: Chefs for Humanity (eliminated after the entrée); Antonia Lofaso, Charity: Beit T'Shuvah (eliminated after the dessert); Michael Psilakis, Charity: The Polycystic Kidney Disease Foundation (winner); Notes: Part three of a five-part All-Stars tournament. Cat Cora also competed in the 2012 All-Stars tournament.
294	4	"All Stars Tournament: Part 4"	Aarón Sánchez, Amanda Freitag, and Scott Conant	May 19, 2015
Ingredients: Appetizer: sea scallops, tahini paste, taro buns, seasoned eggs in soy sauce; Entrée: chickpea curry, beef shoulder, finger limes, coffee pods; Dessert: pistachio cream, dried plums, fish shaped pretzels, carbonated crystals; Contestants: Lee Anne Wong, Charity: Conservation International, Hawaii (eliminated after the appetizer); Fabio Viviani, Charity: ALS Association (eliminated after the entrée); Rocco DiSpirito, Charity: Feeding America (eliminated after the dessert); Jet Tila, Charity: K9s for Warriors (winner); Notes: Part four of a five-part All-Stars tournament.
295	5	"All Stars Tournament: Grand Finale"	Geoffrey Zakarian, Alex Guarnaschelli, and Scott Conant	May 26, 2015
Ingredients: Appetizer: fish carcasses, taleso ham, purple potatoes, Calabrian chili peppers; Entrée: seafood tower, arak, fennel pollen, sea urchin; Dessert: watermelon fruit bowl, French feta cheese, ghost pepper, cookie cake; Contestants: Art Smith, Charity: Reunion (eliminated after the appetizer); Jet Tila, Charity: K9s for Warriors (eliminated after the entrée); Michael Psilakis, Charity: The Polycystic Kidney Disease Foundation (eliminated after the dessert); Anne Burrell, Charity: Juvenile Diabetes Research Foundation (winner); Notes: Finale of a five-part All-Stars tournament, with a $75,000 prize for the charity of the winning chef's choice. The fish carcasses were from catfish heads and cod. The seafood tower included clams, oysters, lobster, and shrimp. Due to the heat of the ghost peppers, goggles were provided in the dessert basket.
296	6	"Tendon Intentions"	Geoffrey Zakarian, Amanda Freitag, and Marc Murphy	July 7, 2015
Ingredients: Appetizer: beef tendon balls, purslane, jerusalem architokes, chocolate peanut butter cups; Entrée: trash fish, olive tapenade, fresh vermicelli noodles, blood oranges; Dessert: egg custard tarts, coffee infused tequila, caramelized onions, pretzels; Contestants: Robert Sevchik, Chef de Cuisine from Seattle, WA (eliminated after the appetizer); Oscar Toro, Executive Sous Chef from New York, NY (eliminated after the entrée); Steven Wambach, Executive Chef from Chicago, IL (eliminated after the dessert); Robyn Almodovar, Food Truck Owner from Miami, FL (winner); Notes: The "trash fish" in Round 2 was scut fish (specifically "porgy", as stated in the Chopped: After Hours segment for this episode). Chef Robyn previously competed on Season 10 of Gordon Ramsay's Hell's Kitchen in 2012, finishing in 6th place; she later returned for Season 17 in 2017 and finished in 5th place. She also later competed on Cutthroat Kitchen.
297	7	"Rock Stars"	Aarón Sánchez, Alex Guarnaschelli, and Chris Santos	August 18, 2015
Ingredients: Appetizer: drumsticks, corn tortillas, champagne, jam; Entrée: lamb t-bones, graffiti eggplants, string cheese, beer; Dessert: rock candy, fresh ginger, lemon roll, spiced German liquor; Contestants: Eddie Ojeda, Charity: Carol M. Baldwin Breast Cancer Research Fund (eliminated after the appetizer); Lita Ford, Charity: Kids First Parental Alienation Awareness (eliminated after the entrée); Dweezil Zappa, Charity: Guitars Not Guns (eliminated after the dessert); Kelly Hansen, Charity: The Grammy Foundation (winner); Notes: Musicians competed for charity in this episode.
298	8	"Wild Ride"	Scott Conant, Amanda Freitag, and Maneet Chauhan	September 3, 2015
Ingredients: Appetizer: corn dogs, candy apples, cream cheese, deep-fried cherry drink; Entrée: deep-fried canned ham, deep-fried ravioli, asparagus, hot beef sundae; Dessert: deep-fried tequila, nectarines, deep-fried butter balls, red, white and blue ice pops; Contestants: Kris Edelen, Executive Chef from New York, NY (eliminated after the appetizer); Eileen Andrade, Chef & Restaurateur from Miami, FL (eliminated after the entrée); Derrick Prince, Sous Chef from New York, NY (eliminated after the dessert); Brian Riggenbach, Executive Chef from Chicago, IL (winner); Notes: The theme of this episode was carnival food with each basket containing two deep fried items. Chef Derrick worked for fellow Chopped judge Chris Santos, who did not appear as a judge in this episode. In the entree round, Chef Eileen forgot a basket ingredient (fried ravioli). In the dessert round, Chef Derrick cut himself but did not know about it until he was alerted by the medic. Blood was found in enough places that the judges could not taste his dish due to possible contamination.
299	9	"College Challenge"	Marc Murphy, Chris Santos, and Roger Mooking	September 10, 2015
Ingredients: Appetizer: ground turkey, bluefoot mushrooms, frozen mixed veggies, instant ramen; Entrée: strip steaks, ranch dressing, broccoli, pizza turnovers; Dessert: potato chips, strawberry toaster pastries, fast food sundae, mini marshmallows; Contestants: Varsha Govindaraju (Senior), University of Washington in Seattle, WA (eliminated after the appetizer); Alex Steinwald (Senior), Northwestern University in Evanston, IL (eliminated after the entrée); O'Shane Elliot (Junior), University of Miami in Miami, FL (eliminated after the dessert); Andrea Galan (Sophomore), New York University in New York, NY (winner); Notes: Four college students competed in this episode. The instant ramen in the appetizer round consisted of dried ramen noodles and a flavoring packet, but the contestants were not required to use both components of the ramen. Chef Andrea later competed on Season 7 of the American version of MasterChef in 2016, finishing in 11th place.
300	10	"Light Makes Right"	Marc Murphy, Amanda Freitag, and Rocco DiSpirito	October 20, 2015
Ingredients: Appetizer: pomegranate yogurt, dandelion greens, pepitas, salmon; Entrée: ground buffalo, muhammara, rainbow carrots, kefir; Dessert: matcha chia smoothie, rice crackers, pineapple, dark chocolate; Contestants: Justin Schwartz, Executive Chef from New York, NY (eliminated after the appetizer); Momo Attaoui, Private Chef from Brooklyn, NY (eliminated after the entrée); Rudy Poindexter, Personal Chef from Arlington, TX (eliminated after the dessert); Ryan Ross, Owner & Private Chef from Bow, WA (winner); Notes: Lighter and healthier ingredients were featured in the baskets. Chef Rudy Poindexter was the personal chef of Texas Rangers first baseman Prince Fielder.
301	11	"Tailgate Fate"	Aarón Sánchez, Chris Santos, and Roger Mooking	November 3, 2015
Ingredients: Appetizer: gameday chili, roasted jalapeño poppers, chicken wings, pretzel rolls; Entrée: three bean salad, burger patties, flask of whiskey, football cupcakes; Dessert: fried apple pies, wine coolers, strawberries, banana pudding; Contestants: Erin Wishon, Executive Chef from Chicago, IL (eliminated after the appetizer); Lamar Moore, Executive Chef from Chicago, IL (eliminated after the entrée); Michell Sanchez, Chef & Restaurateur from Miami, FL (eliminated after the dessert); Seis Kamimura, Executive Chef from Seattle, WA (winner); Notes: The theme of this episode was tailgating and the baskets were replaced by coolers. Chef Michell previously appeared on two other Food Network shows: Guy Fieri's Diners, Drive-Ins and Dives in 2014 and Charles Stiles' Mystery Diners in July 2015, four months before this episode aired.
302	12	"Chopped Gastropub"	Geoffrey Zakarian, Amanda Freitag, and Aarón Sanchez	November 26, 2015
Ingredients: Appetizer: house-smoked bacon, monkfish cheeks, deviled eggs, house-made pickles; Entrée: bangers and mash, Brussels sprouts, white truffle popcorn, Moscow mule; Dessert: house-pulled mozzarella, peanut-caramel chocolate bars, house-made potato tots, craft beer; Contestants: Will Salazar, Executive Sous Chef from Chicago, IL (eliminated after the appetizer); Juan Borjas, Executive Sous Chef from New York, NY (eliminated after the entrée); Fred Maurer, Charcutier from New York, NY (eliminated after the dessert); Dafna Mizrahi, Chef & Restaurateur from Amenia, NY (winner); Notes: Contestants were asked to prepare dishes that one might find at a gastropub. Each round featured at least two gastropub-themed mystery ingredients. Juan Borjas worked for Chopped judge Chris Santos, who did not appear as a judge in this episode.
303	13	"Holiday Cooking"	Marcus Samuelsson, Geoffrey Zakarian, and Aarón Sánchez	December 8, 2015
Ingredients: Appetizer: whole roasted goose, parsnips, green cherries, brie en croûte; Entrée: beef tenderloin, gingersnap cocktail, potato latkes, tzimmes; Dessert: white chocolate apple snowman, pie dough, cranberries, brandy Alexander cocktail; Contestants: Kelsey Nixon (Kelsey's Essentials) (Charity: Every Mother Counts) (eliminated after the appetizer); Jim Stacy (Offbeat Eats) (Charity: The Giving Kitchen) (eliminated after the entrée); Gabriele Corcos (Extra Virgin) (Charity: The Food Bank of New York City) (eliminated after the dessert); Roger Mooking (Man, Fire, Food) (Charity: Save the Children International) (winner); Notes: This was a holiday-themed episode and all the competing chefs were hosts of shows on Cooking Channel playing for charity. Chef Kelsey cut herself in the appetizer round and her food overcooked on the stove while she was getting bandaged, contributing to her being eliminated. Chef Corcos also competed in the 2013 All-Stars tournament prior to this episode. Roger Mooking also served as a judge on Chopped Canada. The gingersnap cocktail in the second round was mixed from vodka, ginger-scented apéritif, allspice, and clove.

=== Season 25 (2015) ===
No. overall	No. in season	Title	Judges	Original release date
304	1	"Teen Tournament: Episode One"	Amanda Freitag, Maneet Chauhan, and Scott Conant	August 25, 2015
Ingredients: Appetizer: swordfish, black garlic mayonnaise, lemon leaves, bear's head mushrooms; Entrée: hanger steak, lollipop kale, apple crisp, spray cheese; Dessert: fruit chew candy, instant yogurt pudding mix, tortilla chips, blueberries; Contestants: Franco Fugel (age 14), from New York, NY (eliminated after the appetizer); Theo Vicioso (age 17), from White Plains, NY (eliminated after the entrée); Anna Mindell (age 15), from New Haven, CT (eliminated after the dessert); Yazmene Kaylani (age 16), from Sussex County, NJ (winner); Notes: This is part 1 of 5 in a tournament with all teenage contestants. Throughout the tournament, contestants were given 30 minutes for the appetizer round.
305	2	"Teen Tournament: Episode Two"	Amanda Freitag, Maneet Chauhan, and Scott Conant	September 1, 2015
Ingredients: Appetizer: wild langoustines, Asian long beans, yuzu juice, Japanese sweet potato; Entrée: lamb shoulder, coconut milk, bok choy, dates; Dessert: powdered peanut butter, ice cream sandwiches, marshmallows, curry powder; Contestants: Alyssa Chacon (age 17), from Union, NJ (eliminated after the appetizer); Nino Asaro (age 16), from New York, NY (eliminated after the entrée); Salma Zahran (age 15), from Brooklyn, NY (eliminated after the dessert); Peter Wenger (age 13), from New York, NY (winner); Notes: Part 2 of 5. Teen Chef Wenger is a protégé of Chef Joel Gargano, who competed in the fifteenth-season episode "Cook Your Butt Off!" Throughout the competition Salma cut herself four times.
306	3	"Teen Tournament: Episode Three"	Chris Santos, Alex Guarnaschelli, and Scott Conant	September 8, 2015
Ingredients: Appetizer: vegan crispy chicken legs, golden beets, tortilla chip lunch kit, pea leaves; Entrée: venison roast, butternut squash, fruity cereal macaroons, okra; Dessert: walnuts in honey, assorted cookies, plums, French toast cereal; Contestants: Jarren Pross (age 14), from Rebersburg, PA (eliminated after the appetizer); Eliza McKelvey age 13), from New York, NY (eliminated after the entrée); Allison Lee (age 13), from New York, NY (eliminated after the dessert); Alexina Chasin (age 14), from Kingston, NY (winner); Notes: Part 3 of 5. The tortilla chip lunch kit in the appetizer round included tortilla chips and some salsa.
307	4	"Teen Tournament: Episode Four"	Chris Santos, Alex Guarnaschelli, and Scott Conant	September 15, 2015
Ingredients: Appetizer: spicy Italian sausage, white asparagus, habanero peppers, soup dumplings; Entrée: veal chops, heirloom tomatoes, glazed doughnuts, Swiss chard; Dessert: flame grapes, peanut and caramel candy bars, Greek yogurt, mango nectar; Contestants: Danny Ganzman (age 15), from Buffalo Grove, IL (eliminated after the appetizer); Olivia Neumark (age 13), from Seattle, WA (eliminated after the entrée); Justin Ballenger (age 16), from Chicago, IL (eliminated after the dessert); Veronica Seguin (age 14), from Bedford, MA (winner); Notes: Part 4 of 5. The candy bars in the dessert round had the brand obscured but it appeared to be Pay Day candy bars. Veronica cut her finger in Round 1 but finished her dish.
308	5	"Viewers' Baskets"	Marc Murphy, Aarón Sánchez, and Geoffrey Zakarian	September 17, 2015
Ingredients: Appetizer: rum raisin ice cream, broccoli spigarello, potato tots, potted meat; Entrée: abalone, wasabi candy canes, beef jerky sticks, yellow snack cakes; Dessert: banana ketchup, fruit cocktail, goat's milk, sauerkraut; Contestants: Erica Nicholls, Executive Chef from Miami, FL (eliminated after the appetizer); Aaron Tekulve, Sous Chef from Seattle, WA (eliminated after the entrée); Jeremy Fleming, Sous Chef from New York, NY (eliminated after the dessert); Mathias Gervais, Executive Chef from Miami Beach, FL (winner); Notes: This was a viewers' choice episode. The basket ingredients were chosen by fans via social media (Facebook, Instagram, and Twitter).
309	6	"Teen Tournament: Grand Finale"	Chris Santos, Alex Guarnaschelli, and Amanda Freitag	September 22, 2015
Ingredients: Appetizer: tuna in oil, super snap peas, fruit candy squares, gnocchi; Entrée: tilefish, baby planet carrots, chanterelle mushrooms, corned beef hash; Dessert: coconut chips, Shirley Temple, quail eggs, chocolate wafer cake; Contestants: Peter Wenger (age 13), from New York, NY (eliminated after the appetizer); Alexina Chasin (age 14), from Kingston, NY (eliminated after the entrée); Yazmene Kaylani (age 16), from Sussex County, NJ (eliminated after the dessert); Veronica Seguin (age 14), from Bedford, MA (winner); Notes: Part 5 of 5. The winner received a $25,000 grand prize, while the other three finalists each received a $1,000 Food Network gift certificate and an authentic Chopped chef's coat.
310	7	"Teen Redeem"	Aarón Sánchez, Maneet Chauhan, and Marc Murphy	September 24, 2015
Ingredients: Appetizer: lump crab meat, daikon radish, Japanese mayonnaise, chili garlic coated peas; Entrée: Korean-style short ribs, wax soda bottles, romanesco cauliflower, calzones; Dessert: cold brew coffee, peanut butter toast, strawberry purée, Italian milk cookies; Contestants: Morgan Goldstein (age 15), from Cleveland, OH (eliminated after the appetizer); Dante Foggy (age 18), from Burlington Township, NJ (eliminated after the entrée); Jay Urena (age 17), from New York, NY (eliminated after the dessert); Max Aronson (age 17), from Woodcliff Lake, NJ (winner); Notes: This redemption episode, the first to feature teen chefs, featured four contestants from the 2014 Teen Tournament. Unlike previous teen episodes, the chefs were not given extra time in the appetizer round.
311	8	"Sitcom Moms"	Chris Santos, Amanda Freitag, and Geoffrey Zakarian	September 29, 2015
Ingredients: Appetizer: TV dinners, portobello mushrooms, fresh spinach, sour cream; Entrée: minute steak, rainbow carrots, cream of celery soup, French toast; Dessert: tiramisu, bananas, strawberry sauce, almonds; Contestants: Jo Marie Payton (Family Matters) (charity: Grandparents Taking Care of Grandchildren) (eliminated after the appetizer); Tichina Arnold (Everybody Hates Chris) (charity: We Win Foundation) (eliminated after the entrée); Betsy Randle (Boy Meets World) (charity: No Kid Hungry) (eliminated after the dessert); Jackée Harry (Sister, Sister) (charity: Thurgood Marshall College Fund) (winner); Notes: This celebrity episode featured four actresses who played sitcom moms, competing for charity. The TV dinners in the appetizer round included turkey, stuffing, and mashed potatoes. Betsy Randle made the final round, despite accidentally leaving a piece of plastic in a round 1 dish, then forgetting an ingredient in round 2. (Payton's appetizer was inconsistently cooked and loaded with raw spices, while Arnold's entree didn't transform her ingredients enough.)
312	9	"Bizarre Battle"	Marcus Samuelsson, Marc Murphy, and Scott Conant	October 8, 2015
Ingredients: Appetizer: duckbills, young jackfruit in brine, hand-pulled noodles, fruit-flavored beef jerky; Entrée: pork bung, hot sauce jelly beans, farro, pork dust; Dessert: smen, aloe mango pudding, warka pastry sheets, poi; Contestants: Katie Wentworth, Executive Sous Chef from Seattle, WA (eliminated after the appetizer); Lucerno Martinez Obregon, Executive Chef from New York, NY (eliminated after the entrée); Josh Elliot, Executive Chef from Miami Beach, FL (eliminated after the dessert); Cory Morris, Executive Chef from Chicago, IL (winner); Notes: The baskets featured "bizarre" ingredients. Chef Morris worked for Iron Chef Jose Garces.
313	10	"Oktoberfest!"	Geoffrey Zakarian, Maneet Chauhan, and Edi Frauneder	October 13, 2015
Ingredients: Appetizer: sülze, sauerkraut, German soft pretzels, beer cheese soup; Entrée: (pork) schnitzel, mittelscharf, turnips, keg of beer; Dessert: chocolate sausage, spätzle, blackberries, bock beer; Contestants: Ivan Giani, Executive Chef from New York, NY (eliminated after the appetizer); Taylor Erickson, Personal Chef from Los Angeles, CA (eliminated after the entrée); Heiner Aichem, Executive Chef & Owner from Stanhope, NJ (eliminated after the dessert); Deborah Caplan, Line Cook from New York, NY (winner); Notes: The theme of this episode was Oktoberfest. The beer keg contained Kölsch.
314	11	"Thanksgiving Soup-er Stars"	Marc Murphy, Amanda Freitag, and Aarón Sánchez	November 9, 2015
Ingredients: Appetizer: leftover turkey, leftover mashed potatoes, leftover cranberry sauce, leftover green beans; Entrée: whole turkey breast, potatoes, cranberries, green beans; Dessert: turkey ice cream cake, mashed potato candy, cranberry salsa, green bean ice pops; Contestants: Gretchen Roth, Food Services Manager at The Bowery Mission, New York, NY (eliminated after the appetizer); Bonnie Kepplinger, Volunteer Cook at The Crib at the Night Ministry, Chicago, IL (eliminated after the entrée); Victor Squire, Soup Kitchen Chef at The Open Door Shelter, Norwalk, CT (eliminated after the dessert); Sister Alicia Torres, Franciscan Nun at Franciscans of the Eucharist of Chicago, Chicago, IL (winner); Notes: This was a Thanksgiving episode featuring four soup kitchen chefs. Each basket contained the same ingredients, but in different forms. Each chef's respective soup kitchen received a donation from Food Network win or lose. The chefs had 30 minutes in the appetizer round instead of the usual 20 minutes.
315	12	"Cooking with Bass"	Marc Murphy, Maneet Chauhan, and Marcus Samuelsson	November 24, 2015
Ingredients: Appetizer: popcorn, chicken hearts, escarole, persimmons; Entrée: sea bass, Anjou pears, poblano peppers, saffron; Dessert: zucchini, chocolate-covered raisins, vanilla liqueur, peanut brittle; Contestants: Laura Cheng, Executive Chef from Chicago, IL (eliminated after the appetizer); Alex Rodil, Executive Chef from Miami, FL (eliminated after the entrée); Rob Hafer, Sous Chef from Chicago, IL (eliminated after the dessert); Rosa Soto, Pastry Chef from Seattle, WA (winner)
316	13	"Mac and Cheese"	Maneet Chauhan, Alex Guarnaschelli, and Aarón Sánchez	December 1, 2015
Ingredients: Appetizer: mac and cheese, Canadian bacon, Swiss chard, monkfish; Entrée: pasta shells, chorizo, spring peas, rotisserie chicken; Dessert: rigatoni, white chocolate, roasted figs, mac and cheese ice cream; Contestants: Matt Jozwiak, Research & Development Chef from New York, NY (eliminated after the appetizer); Bun Cheam, Executive Chef from Brooklyn, NY (eliminated after the entrée); Tiffany Minter, Executive Sous Chef from New York, NY (eliminated after the dessert); Joe Cecchini, Chef de Cuisine from Chicago, IL (winner); Notes: This episode featured variations of mac and cheese ingredients in every basket.

=== Season 26 (2015) ===
No. overall	No. in season	Title	Judges	Original release date
317	1	"A Chopped Halloween"	Aarón Sánchez, Alex Guarnaschelli, and Geoffrey Zakarian	October 6, 2015
Ingredients: Appetizer: gory ribs, broccoli rabe, blood soup, mozzarella eyeballs; Entrée: lobster, pickled pigs lips, squid ink pasta, coffin toast; Dessert: Day of the Dead cookies, watermelon brain, chocolate covered bugs, boo-nilla shakes; Contestants: Jeny Weimer, Executive Chef & Co-Owner from New York, NY (eliminated after the appetizer); Celinda Norton, Chef & Food Blogger from Seattle, WA (eliminated after the entrée); Leo Mamaril, Chef de Tournade from New York, NY (eliminated after the dessert); Heather Borden, Chef from New York, NY (winner); Notes: This was a Halloween themed episode. The coffin toast in the entree round consisted of a toasted bread boat filled with seafood and a cream sauce. In Round 2 Chef Celinda forgot the pickled pigs lips and she cut herself. She used the same cutting board side with her blood on it, resulting in the judges not tasting her dish and eliminating her. The "boo-nilla" shakes in the dessert round were vanilla milkshakes.
318	2	"Chopped Catwalk"	Marc Murphy, Marcus Samuelsson, and Maneet Chauhan	October 15, 2015
Ingredients: Appetizer: tuna in a bag, gazpacho, finger limes, kale chips; Entrée: sea bass, veggie tray with hummus, avocados, chia seeds; Dessert: strawberry lemonade, butter crackers, coconut fruit pops, cape gooseberries; Contestants: Din Yates, Model/Chef & Restaurateur from New York, NY (eliminated after the appetizer); Crosby Tailor, Model/Chef & Entrepreneur from, Los Angeles, CA (eliminated after the entrée); Danika Brysha, Model/Private Chef from New York, NY (eliminated after the dessert); Ashley Holt, Model/Pastry Chef & Owner from Brooklyn, NY (winner); Notes: All of the contestants were models and professional chefs.
319	3	"Food Truck Kitchen"	Scott Conant, Maneet Chauhan, and Geoffrey Zakarian	October 27, 2015
Ingredients: Appetizer: bao buns, cracklings, duck sauce, gyros; Entrée: bibimbap, rainbow chard, fresh chickpeas, footlong hot dogs; Dessert: doughnuts, green apricots, cocoa hazelnut spread, ice cream bars; Contestants: Franky Karagiorgos, Chef and Co-Owner from New York, NY (eliminated after the appetizer); Jonny Silverberg, Chef & Owner from Seattle, WA (eliminated after the entrée); Leah Wilcox, Chef & Owner from Chicago, IL (eliminated after the dessert); Hilda Hilman, Chef & Owner, from Seattle, WA (winner); Notes: All of the contestants in this episode owned food trucks.
320	4	"Military Vets"	Marc Murphy, Maneet Chauhan, and Chris Santos	November 10, 2015
Ingredients: Appetizer: roasted chicken, seven-layer dip, corn on the cob, scalloped potatoes; Entrée: meatloaf, corn muffin mix, green tomatoes, yogurt parfait; Dessert: lemonade, ballpark peanuts, puffed rice cereal bars, peaches; Contestants: Ellen Adams, Personal Chef/Air Force Veteran from Rochester, NY (eliminated after the appetizer); Alex Magloire, Executive Chef/Navy Veteran from Asbury Park, NJ (eliminated after the entrée); Johnny Ulloa, Sous Chef/Coast Guard Veteran from New York, NY (eliminated after the dessert); Roshara Sanders, Executive Chef/Army Veteran from Milford, CT (winner); Notes: All contestants in this episode were veterans of the United States Military Services.
321	5	"Chopped Desserts!"	Geoffrey Zakarian, Alex Guarnaschelli, and Johnny Iuzzini	November 23, 2015
Ingredients: Appetizer: (chocolate round) Mississippi mud pie, brie cheese, Italian maraschino cherries, potato crisps; Entrée: (candy round) champagne, wafer sheets, cookie spread, green strawberries; Dessert: (cake round) avocado, rangpur limes, hazelnut flour, Persian rice; Contestants: Sarah Mispagel, Pastry Chef, Nightwood, Chicago, IL (eliminated after the appetizer); Anthony Hunt, Corporate Pastry Chef, Restaurant People Group, South Florida, FL (eliminated after the entrée); Jasmin Bell, Manager & Pastry Chef, Le Rêve Bakery & Café, Seattle, WA (eliminated after the dessert); Mathew Rice, Executive Pastry Chef, Girl & The Goat, Chicago, IL (winner); Notes: Four pastry chefs competed in this episode where all 3 rounds were dessert rounds. Each round focused on a different dessert: chocolate, candy, and cake. The 1st round was extended to 30 minutes instead of the usual 20 minutes. The 3rd round was 60 minutes instead of 30 to allow the chefs enough time to bake and decorate their cakes.
322	6	"In-Laws, in Teams!"	Amanda Freitag, Alex Guarnaschelli, and Maneet Chauhan	December 10, 2015
Ingredients: Appetizer: lasagna, arugula, onion blossom chips, wine purse; Entrée: brisket, imitation sunny-side up eggs, mashed potatoes, leeks; Dessert: monkey bread, feijoa, cream cheese, orange blossom water; Contestants: Ada Santa (MIL) & Jaime Santa (DIL), from New York, NY (eliminated after the appetizer); Joan Low (MIL) & Linda Low (DIL), from Raleigh, NC (eliminated after the entrée); Kathie Leonard (MIL) & Danielle Leonard (DIL), from Salem, MA (eliminated after the dessert); Mara Cristiani (MIL) & Gena Cristiani (DIL), from Sarasota, FL (winner); Notes: Teams of two amateur cooks, each consisting of a mother-in-law (MIL) and her daughter-in-law (DIL), competed in this episode. The wine purse in the first round contained white Bordeaux. The imitation sunny-side up eggs in the second round were made from tofu and soy.
323	7	"Family Affair"	Geoffrey Zakarian, Maneet Chauhan, and Marc Murphy	December 15, 2015
Ingredients: Appetizer: pork roll, baby eggplant, pizza dough, Chinese spaghetti sauce; Entrée: chicken breasts, tzatziki, stinging nettles, cornbread stuffing; Dessert: cassata cake, white chocolate chips, blood orange crackers, pine nuts; Contestants: Ryan Profetto (Heather's son), College Student from Milford, CT (eliminated after the appetizer); John Profetto (Heather's husband), Business Manager & Co-Owner from Milford, CT (eliminated after the entrée); Kate Campbell (Heather's sister), Chef de Cuisine from Milford, CT (eliminated after the dessert); Heather Profetto, Chef & Co-Owner from Milford, CT (winner); Notes: This episode featured a family of four competing head to head. It's the second time all four contestants were family members that worked at the same restaurant.
324	8	"Battle of the Grandpas"	Aarón Sánchez, Maneet Chauhan, and Chris Santos	December 17, 2015
Ingredients: Appetizer: bologna, mango salsa, frozen hashbrowns, maple egg cream; Entrée: London broil, rutabaga, broccoli rabe, peanut butter taffy bites; Dessert: strawberry pretzel pie, kiwi, chocolate milk powder, orange-flavored liqueur; Contestants: Artie Wachtel, Retired Sales Manager from New York, NY (eliminated after the appetizer); Stanley Myers, Retired Postal Office Worker from Sayreville, NJ (eliminated after the entrée); Gary Stamm, Community Theater Performer from Pleasant Prairie, WI (eliminated after the dessert); Nelson Andreu, Chief of Police from Miami, FL (winner); Notes: The competitors were amateur cooks and grandfathers. The contestants were given 30 minutes in the appetizer round instead of the usual 20. Gary Stamm is the father of former Chopped contestant April Stamm.

=== Season 27 (2016) ===
- Chopped regular Marc Murphy did not appear as a judge in any episode this season.

No. overall	No. in season	Title	Judges	Original release date
325	1	"Knife Strife"	Christian Petroni, Alex Guarnaschelli, and Chris Santos	January 5, 2016
Ingredients: Appetizer: arancini, blood sausage, lemongrass, ajo dulce; Entrée: porchetta, popcorn on the cob, okra, crema catalana; Dessert: lardo, smoked maple syrup, pizza dough, tartufo; Contestants: Gary Ly, Sous Chef from Houston, TX (eliminated after the appetizer); Dawn Burrell, Line Cook from Houston, TX (eliminated after the entrée); Jason Kerr, Chef & Food Sourcer from Houston, TX (eliminated after the dessert); Raffaele Ronca, Chef & Restaurateur from New York, NY (winner); Notes: Guest judge Christian Petroni was a former Chopped champion (Episode 4.5 – "Mussels Mastery & Cotton Candy Can-Do") and Chopped tournament competitor (Episode 5.7 - "$50,000 Tournament: Round Four").
326	2	"Healthy Rivalry"	Geoffrey Zakarian, Maneet Chauhan, and Scott Conant	January 12, 2016
Ingredients: Appetizer: beets, 100-calorie almond pack, cauliflower pizza crust, Chilean sea bass fillets; Entrée: bone broth, teff, edamame noodles, grass-fed beef strip loin; Dessert: ghee, coconut sugar, guava, chickpea flour; Contestants: Aviv Regev, Private Chef from New York, NY (eliminated after the appetizer); Charles Chen, Private Chef from New York, NY (eliminated after the entrée); Brenden Darby, Private Chef from San Francisco, CA (eliminated after the dessert); Jesa Henneberry, Private Chef from New York, NY (winner); Notes: Contestants were asked to cook healthy, lighter dishes with nothing too fatty or heavy.
327	3	"Brunch Battle"	Aarón Sánchez, Alex Guarnaschelli, and Chris Santos	January 19, 2016
Ingredients: Appetizer: smoked whitefish, deviled quail eggs, biscuits, bloody mary; Entrée: duck eggs, (whole) chicken, waffles, mimosa; Dessert: farm fresh eggs, cappuccino, Concord grape doughnuts, poached pears; Contestants: Nick Williams, Executive Chef from Brooklyn, NY (eliminated after the appetizer); Kirsten Hocker, Chef from, Brooklyn, NY (eliminated after the entrée); Zack Northcutt, Executive Chef from Austin, TX (eliminated after the dessert); Eric Gibbs, Sous Chef from San Francisco, CA (winner); Notes: Contestants were asked to make brunch-themed dishes.
328	4	"Chinese New Year"	Scott Conant, Amanda Freitag, and Chris Cheung	January 26, 2016
Ingredients: Appetizer: Peking duck, leeks, Chinese New Year eight-treasure rice pudding, Chinese sausage; Entrée: chicken feet, turnip cakes, dragon fruit, whole red snapper; Dessert: giant fortune cookies, good luck candy, ginger beer, winter melon; Contestants: Justin Herrera, Sous Chef from New York, NY (eliminated after the appetizer); Vanarin Kuch, Pastry Chef from New York, NY (eliminated after the entrée); Martin Weaver, Chef de Cuisine from Houston, TX (eliminated after the dessert); Kathy Fang, Executive Chef from San Francisco, CA (winner); Notes: This was a Chinese New Year-themed episode with Chinese-centric ingredients.
329	5	"Tailgate Party"	Aarón Sanchez, Chris Santos, and Eddie Jackson	February 2, 2016
Ingredients: Appetizer: quinoa burgers, deep-fried bacon, screwdriver, hoagie dip; Entrée: bratwurst, shredded cheddar, beer, grilled corn; Dessert: corn chip bars, rum & cola, blackberries, bananas; Contestants: Kirk Bronsord, from Oakland, CA (eliminated after the appetizer); Nick Caputi, from Queens, NY (eliminated after the entrée); Tim Lyons, from Houston, TX (eliminated after the dessert); Jill Falgiano, from West New York, NJ (winner); Notes: The theme of this episode was tailgating and the baskets were replaced by coolers. The contestants were amateur cooks and experienced tailgaters. Instead of the traditional chefs coats, the contestants wore specially made Chopped football jerseys.
330	6	"Bacon Boys"	Scott Conant, Maneet Chauhan, and Chris Santos	February 7, 2016
Ingredients: Appetizer: slab bacon, baby turnips, bacon-flavored popcorn, banana jam; Entrée: ham hock, dandelion greens, bacon ice cream, back bacon; Dessert: "bacon & egg" gummies, figs, chicharron, lardo; Contestants: Nick Lisotto, Executive Chef from Philadelphia, PA (eliminated after the appetizer); Gray Rollin, Chef & Restaurateur from Santa Rosa, CA (eliminated after the entrée); Coby Farrow, Executive Chef from New York, NY (eliminated after the dessert); Jay Abrams, Executive Chef from San Francisco, CA (winner); Notes: This episode featured bacon in every basket. The "bacon" gummies in the third round were strawberry flavored. All the chefs were men and wore specially made bacon T-shirts and blue jean aprons instead of the chefs coats.
331	7	"Love Bites"	Geoffrey Zakarian, Alex Guarnaschelli, and Scott Conant	February 9, 2016
Ingredients: Appetizer: oysters, avocados, chocolate-covered strawberries, whipped cream vodka; Entrée: figs, mead, asparagus, bone-in rib eye; Dessert: chocolate mousse, éclairs, pomegranates, port wine; Contestants: Mark Bailey, Private Chef from New York, NY (eliminated after the appetizer); Giovanna Alvarez, Executive Sous Chef from New York, NY (eliminated after the entrée); Rafaelle Solinas, Executive Chef from New York, NY (eliminated after the dessert); Joshua Van Den Berg, Line Cook from New York, NY (winner); Notes: This theme of this episode was love, with each basket containing one or more ingredients believed to be aphrodisiacs.
332	8	"Ready for Redemption"	Chris Santos, Maneet Chauhan, and Geoffrey Zakarian	February 16, 2016
Ingredients: Appetizer: pig snouts, fava beans, teething biscuits, strawberry daiquiri jam; Entrée: cheesecake, leg of lamb, garam masala, bitter melon; Dessert: cocoa nibs, durian paste, raspberries, coconut milk; Contestants: Gilbert Delgado (Episode 20.12 – "Chopped Chops") (eliminated after the appetizer); Danika Brysha (Episode 26.2 – "Chopped Catwalk") (eliminated after the entrée); Anastacia Song (Episode 22.8 – "Late Night Food Brawl") (eliminated after the dessert); Tim Witcher (Episode 22.12 – "Thrill of the Grill") (winner); Notes: Every contestant was a former runner-up seeking redemption.
333	9	"Cooking Caribbean"	Aarón Sanchez, Tino Feliciano, and John Suley	February 23, 2016
Ingredients: Appetizer: shrimp, papaya, canned spiced ham, mofongo; Entrée: goat chops, chickpeas, callaloo, whole coconuts; Dessert: sugarcane, mangoes, sweet potatoes, rum; Contestants: Keisha Bocage, Chef & Owner from Houston, TX (eliminated after the appetizer); Rocco Nankervis, Executive Chef from Houston, TX (eliminated after the entrée); Brandon Soverall, Chef de Cuisine from Houston, TX (eliminated after the dessert); Andre Fowles, Sous Chef from New York, NY (winner); Notes: Contestants were asked to create Caribbean-inspired dishes with the Caribbean ingredients in each basket. During the entrée round, contestants were given a hammer to open the coconut. The callaloo greens in the entrée round appeared to be the variety from taro leaves.
334	10	"Truck Stop Stars"	Amanda Freitag, Chris Santos, and Aarón Sanchez	March 1, 2016
Ingredients: Appetizer: red-eye gravy, fennel, black garlic, meatloaf mix; Entrée: grits, cola, purple cauliflower, cube steak; Dessert: french fries, cactus pears, apple pie, bacon; Contestants: Jake Harbeck, Chef from Walcott, IA (eliminated after the appetizer); Shaun Yazbek, Executive Chef from Bangor, ME (eliminated after the entrée); Eva Dix, Chef & Co-Owner from McLean, IL (eliminated after the dessert); J.R. Tiger, Chef from Harrisburg, PA (winner); Notes: Every contestant was a chef at a truck stop.
335	11	"Beg, Borrow or Eel"	Chris Santos, Maneet Chauhan, and Aarón Sánchez	March 8, 2016
Ingredients: Appetizer: uova da raviolo, comté cheese, fresh bacon bits, eel; Entrée: Italian olive salad, Cornish hens, crisp bread, puntarelle; Dessert: satay peanut sauce, ripe yellow plantains, chocolate snack pies, black vinegar; Contestants: Haley Sausner, Chef de Cuisine from San Francisco, CA (eliminated after the appetizer); Jase Grimm, Executive Chef from Brookhaven, NY (eliminated after the entrée); Ryan Lory, Executive Sous Chef from New York, NY (eliminated after the dessert); Shannen Tune, Food Truck Chef from Houston, TX (winner)
336	12	"Chopped: College"	Chris Santos, Alex Guarnaschelli, and Maneet Chauhan	March 15, 2016
Ingredients: Appetizer: rice & beans, chicken cutlets, tomato soup, energy drink; Entrée: coffee, Brussels sprouts, frozen mac & cheese, skirt steak; Dessert: chocolate hazelnut spread, graham cracker cereal, rambutans, lime gelatin shots; Contestants: Danielle Wilk, from Rutgers University in New Brunswick, NJ (eliminated after the appetizer); Alvin Zhou, from Columbia University in New York, NY (eliminated after the entrée); Drew Friedman, from Lafayette College in Easton, PA (eliminated after the dessert); Jenn Cheng, from New York University in New York, NY (winner); Notes: Every contestant was an amateur cook and college undergraduate.
337	13	"The Bold and the Baconful"	Chris Santos, Marcus Samuelsson, and Nick Anderer	March 17, 2016
Ingredients: Appetizer: bacon-wrapped grilled cheese sandwiches, truffle carpaccio, baby eggplant, clotted cream; Entrée: pork shoulder, tea noodles, kohlrabi, agua fresca; Dessert: honeycrisp apples, extra-spicy cheese puffs, quick cook rice, French butter; Contestants: Sean Carroll, Chef from Houston, TX (eliminated after the appetizer); Angela Rowley, Chef from Houston, TX (eliminated after the entrée); Martin Horsey, Chef from Houston, TX (eliminated after the dessert); Justin Turner, Chef & Restaurateur from Houston, TX (winner); Notes: Every contestant was a "street food chef" from Houston, Texas.

=== Season 28 (2016) ===
No. overall	No. in season	Title	Judges	Original release date
338	1	"Chopped Champions: Battle 1, Best of the Best"	Aarón Sánchez, Maneet Chauhan, and Marc Murphy	March 29, 2016
Ingredients: Appetizer: soft pretzels, green romano beans, papaya, pig ears; Entrée: grouper, frilly mustard greens, bread cheese, beer flight; Dessert: curry cooking sauce, lady apples, coconut brittle, baby artichokes; Contestants: Stacey Givens (Episode 22.13 – "Scoops On!") (eliminated after the appetizer); Daniel Sharp (Episode 23.1 – "Every 'Wich Way") (eliminated after the entrée); Elderoy Arendse (Episode 20.13 – "Pesto Chango") (eliminated after the dessert); Meny Vaknin (Episode 22.11 – "Hot Stuff") (advances to final round) (winner); Notes: First episode of a five-part tournament. Four returning champions compete for a spot in the tournament finale. The beer flight in the second round contained four different types of beer.
339	2	"Chopped Champions: Battle 2, Fighting Shape"	Aarón Sánchez, Alex Guarnaschelli, and Marcus Samuelsson	April 5, 2016
Ingredients: Appetizer: smoked sausage, cavatappi, Napa cabbage, frozen yogurt; Entrée: beef kidneys, petite French lentils, beets, pickled cockles; Dessert: queso arrocero, peanut butter chocolate wafers, raspberry spoon fruit, dandelion coffee; Contestants: Georgeann Leaming (Episode 19.9 – "Peri Peri Determined") (eliminated after the appetizer); Thiago Silva (Episode 22.10 – "Fabulous Baker Boys") (eliminated after the entrée); Dafna Mizrahi (Episode 24.12 – "Chopped Gastropub") (eliminated after the dessert); Adam Greenberg (Episode 22.8 – "Late Night Food Brawl") (advances to final round) (winner); Notes: Second episode of a five-part tournament. While Chopped normally obscures brand names, the smoked sausage in the first round was a product of Chopped sponsor Hillshire Farms. The frozen yogurt in the first round was not flavored.
340	3	"Chopped Champions: Battle 3, Chefs in Control"	Geoffrey Zakarian, Chris Santos, and Christian Petroni	April 12, 2016
Ingredients: Appetizer: chicken livers, cinnamon whiskey, edamame, grape licorice; Entrée: duck breasts, harissa, pear frangipane tart, orange sherbet; Dessert: bison jerky, sour cream, freeze-dried blueberries, egg waffles; Contestants: Raffaele Ronca (Episode 27.1 – "Knife Strife") (eliminated after the appetizer); Mo Major (Episode 23.7 – "T.G.I. Fry-Day") (eliminated after the entrée); Roro Morales (Episode 22.1 – "Mummies and Gummies") (eliminated after the dessert); Deborah Caplan (Episode 25.10 – "Oktoberfest!") (advances to final round) (winner); Notes: Third episode of a five-part tournament. Guest judge Christian Petroni was a former Chopped champion (Episode 4.5 – "Mussels Mastery & Cotton Candy Can-Do") and Chopped tournament competitor (Episode 5.7 - "$50,000 Tournament: Round Four").
341	4	"Chopped Champions: Battle 4, Kitchen Storm"	Aarón Sánchez, Alex Guarnaschelli, and Angie Mar	April 19, 2016
Ingredients: Appetizer: stone crab claws, butterfly leaves, vanilla frosting, peach-strawberry salsa; Entrée: rack of wild boar, dried spicy mango, baby kale, piña colada; Dessert: saffron, honeycomb, duck mousse, sea beans; Contestants: Silvia Baldini (Episode 23.10 – "Fake Cake, Real Stakes") (eliminated after the appetizer); Adam Sappington (Episode 23.6 – "Double Trouble") (eliminated after the entrée); Jackie Sappington (Episode 23.6 – "Double Trouble") (eliminated after the dessert); Andre Fowles (Episode 27.9 – "Cooking Caribbean") (advances to final round) (winner); Notes: Fourth episode of a five-part tournament. Contestants Adam and Jackie Sappington had previously won a couples' team competition episode, but competed individually in this episode. Guest judge Angie Mar was the winner of the second Chopped: Grill Masters Tournament (Special 11 - "Grill Masters: Episode Five"). The duck mousse in the third round contained duck liver and port wine.
342	5	"Chopped Champions: Conclusion, $50,000 Pay Day"	Amanda Freitag, Scott Conant, and Angie Mar	April 26, 2016
Ingredients: Appetizer: Mangalitsa pork burgers, chow mein noodles, tardivo, blood clams; Entrée: leg of lamb, blue cheese lollipops, cognac, cardoons; Dessert: chocoflan, satsuma mandarin, smoked almonds, caramelized onions; Contestants: Meny Vaknin (Episode 22.11 – "Hot Stuff") (eliminated after the appetizer); Deborah Caplan (Episode 25.10 – "Oktoberfest!") (eliminated after the entrée); Andre Fowles (Episode 27.9 – "Cooking Caribbean") (eliminated after the dessert); Adam Greenberg (Episode 22.8 – "Late Night Food Brawl") (winner); Notes: Fifth episode of a five-part tournament. Guest judge Angie Mar was the winner of the second Chopped: Grill Masters Tournament (Special 11 - "Grill Masters: Episode Five").
343	6	"Cinco de Mayo Fiesta"	Aarón Sánchez, Amanda Freitag, and Ulrich Koberstein	May 3, 2016
Ingredients: Appetizer: margarita pie, nopales, masa dough, mahi mahi; Entrée: corn cookies, Mexican-style cheese blend, jicama, beef barbacoa; Dessert: piñata, black beans, crema, Mexican hot chocolate; Contestants: Artist Thornton, Executive Chef from East Harlem, NY (eliminated after the appetizer); Sylva Senat, Executive Chef from Philadelphia, PA (eliminated after the entrée); Telmo Faria, Executive Chef from San Francisco, CA (eliminated after the dessert); Adrian Ramirez, Executive Chef from New York, NY (winner); Notes: This was a Cinco de Mayo themed episode and contestants were asked to cook Mexican cuisine. The piñata in the third round contained assorted candies including caramel squares, strawberry hard candy, and round peppermints.
344	7	"Tortellini Trials"	Marc Murphy, Maneet Chauhan, and David Loewenberg	May 10, 2016
Ingredients: Appetizer: tortellini, goat milk caramel, bottarga, radishes; Entrée: jambalaya, marlin, chocolate covered garlic, kale; Dessert: olive oil tortas, rambutan, coconut milk, lime pickle; Contestants: Crystal Wahpepah, Chef & Owner from Oakland, CA (eliminated after the appetizer); Daniel Fleming, Sous Chef from Hoboken, NJ (eliminated after the entrée); Laercio 'Junior' Chamon, Chef & Restaurateur from Little Silver, NJ (eliminated after the dessert); Lauren Van Liew, Caterer from Red Bank, NJ (winner)
345	8	"Hungry for Love"	Marcus Samuelsson, Maneet Chauhan, and Christian Petroni	May 17, 2016
Ingredients: Appetizer: scallops, dirty martini, Buddha's hand, dates; Entrée: veal chuck roast, bucatini pasta, honeynut squash, chocolate lips; Dessert: rose bud tea, chocolate honeycomb candy, crème anglaise, mangosteens; Contestants: Peter Endrigian and Sally Meehan, Actor/Maitre'd from New York, NY and Actor/Model from New York, NY (eliminated after the appetizer); Tayo Ola and Elena Ng, Food Blogger from New York, NY and Bodybuilder from New York, NY (eliminated after the entrée); Miles McKirdy and Stephanie Rizzolo, Bartender from New York, NY and Dining Concierge from New Brunswick, NJ (eliminated after the dessert); Ian Phillips and Santana Benítez, Bartender from New York, NY and Non-Profit Volunteer from New York, NY (winner); Notes: This was a blind date team competition where 2 amateur cooks were paired up based on their interests and what they were looking for in a romantic partner. They met for the first time on the show and had to work together to try and win. The episode focused not only on the cooking, but also on how well the dates got along.
346	9	"Summer Heat"	Aarón Sánchez, Maneet Chauhan, and Geoffrey Zakarian	May 24, 2016
Ingredients: Appetizer: lobster, zucchini, cucumber pineapple cooler, sand castle cake; Entrée: clambake, fresh chickpeas, potato chips, rainbow chard; Dessert: fruit kabobs, iced tea, whipped topping, ice cream sandwiches; Contestants: Dean Barker, Sous Chef from New York, NY (eliminated after the appetizer); Allison Kave, Chef & Owner from Brooklyn, NY (eliminated after the entrée); Adrianna Montano, Sous Chef from New York, NY (eliminated after the dessert); Ken West, Executive Chef from North Caldwell, NJ (winner); Notes: Each basket contained ingredients associated with summertime. Chef Allison Kave is the sister of former Chopped champion and Chopped tournament competitor Corwin Kave. The sand castle cake in the first round was pound cake with a graham cracker "sand". The clambake in the second round contained mussels, steamer clams, potatoes, corn, and seaweed.
347	10	"Deadliest Baskets"	Marc Murphy, Aarón Sánchez, and Marcus Samuelsson	May 31, 2016
Ingredients: Appetizer: rattlesnake, cherimoya, rhubarb, ghost pepper; Entrée: alligator, absinthe, oysters, delicata squash; Dessert: huitlacoche, nutmeg, butterscotch beer, 'shark'; Contestants: John Beatty, Executive Chef from New York, NY (eliminated after the appetizer); Mike Bianco, Chef de Cuisine from Dobbs Ferry, NY (eliminated after the entrée); Mitchell Faber, Caterer from San Francisco, CA (eliminated after the dessert); Erin Smith, Executive Chef from Houston, TX (winner); Notes: Each basket featured dangerous ingredients, some deadly if not prepared properly. The 'shark' in the dessert round was a watermelon carved to look like a shark.
348	11	"Chopping Block Blues"	Geoffrey Zakarian, Marc Murphy, and Janine Booth	June 7, 2016
Ingredients: Appetizer: Scotch eggs, baby leeks, crema, sauerkraut; Entrée: mackerel, squid ink base, candied orange peel, graffiti eggplant; Dessert: fruit ring cereal, molasses, cherries, sesame candy; Contestants: Lenny Messina, Chef de Cuisine from Great Neck, NY (eliminated after the appetizer); Bruce Marais, Private Chef from New York, NY (eliminated after the entrée); Katherine Fuchs, Executive Chef & Restaurateur from Queens, NY (eliminated after the dessert); Mark Liberman, Executive Chef & Restaurateur from San Francisco, CA (winner)
349	12	"San Franchopco"	Scott Conant, Maneet Chauhan, and Chris Santos	June 14, 2016
Ingredients: Appetizer: garlic fries, pea tendrils, shishito peppers, mission style burritos; Entrée: California common beer, Chinese okra, quince, quail; Dessert: Irish coffee, sourdough bread bowl, California pomegranates, chocolate bars; Contestants: Mariko Wilkinson, Farm Chef from Marshall, CA (eliminated after the appetizer); Sean Thomas, Chef de Cuisine from San Francisco, CA (eliminated after the entrée); Emily Hansen, Private Chef from San Francisco, CA (eliminated after the dessert); Joe Sasto, Sous Chef from San Francisco, CA (winner); Notes: All four chefs were from the San Francisco Bay area and the baskets featured one or more San Francisco-themed ingredients.
350	13	"Leap of Faith"	Marc Murphy, Alex Guarnaschelli, and Geoffrey Zakarian	June 21, 2016
Ingredients: Appetizer: salmon, spring onions, raw white honey, Ezekiel bread; Entrée: lamb shoulder steaks, quince, cerignola olives, kosher wine; Dessert: figs, rainbow carrots, macadamia nuts, hamantaschen; Contestants: Father Justin Matro, Benedictine Monk & Pastor from Crabtree, PA (eliminated after the appetizer); Sister Sara Marks, Franciscan Nun from Philadelphia, PA (eliminated after the entrée); Rabbi Hanoch Hecht, from Rhinebeck, NY (eliminated after the dessert); Pastor Areli Biggers, Family Life Pastor from Hopkington, MA (winner); Notes: All four contestants were amateur cooks and religious leaders. The baskets featured one or more biblical-themed or religious-themed ingredients. Rabbi Hecht is strictly kosher and therefore could not cook meat and dairy in the same competition. To accommodate this the baskets kept kosher and the pantry was stocked with dairy substitutes such as margarine and non-dairy whipping cream.

=== Season 29 (2016) ===
No. overall	No. in season	Title	Judges	Original release date
351	1	"Fried Chicken Time"	Marc Murphy, Amanda Freitag, and Craig Samuel	August 7, 2016
Ingredients: Appetizer: half-roasted chicken thighs, scallion pancakes, kimchi, cherry cola sundae sauce; Entrée: whole brined chickens, pimento cheese, okra, peach cobbler; Dessert: chicken skin, Nashville hot chicken paste, sweet potato ice cream, buttermilk biscuits; Contestants: Jayson Reynolds, Chef & Caterer from Austin, TX (eliminated after the appetizer); Shanice Fleming, Line Cook from New York, NY (eliminated after the entrée); Tyler Henderson, Executive Chef from Santa Fe, TX (eliminated after the dessert); Brandon Peacock, Executive Chef from San Francisco, CA (winner); Notes: The theme of this episode was fried chicken with chicken of some kind in every basket. The deep-fryer was turned off and each chef was given a pre-heated pot of oil on their station. Chef Jayson Reynolds' wife is Chopped Champion Janelle Reynolds.
352	2	"Snail Snafus"	Geoffrey Zakarian, Amanda Freitag, and Edward Lee	August 9, 2016
Ingredients: Appetizer: canned escargot, popcorn shoots, cocktail franks, orzo; Entrée: tilefish, chayote squash, garlic knots, cookie butter chocolate bites; Dessert: pomelo, marcona almonds, grenadine, angel food cake; Contestants: William Gilchriest, Executive Chef from Houston, TX (eliminated after the appetizer); Elisha Weitz, Corporate Chef from Parsippany, NJ (eliminated after the entrée); Kaley Laird, Executive Chef & Pastry Chef from San Francisco, CA (eliminated after the dessert); Aarthi Sampath, Chef de Cuisine from New York, NY (winner); Notes: Chef Sampath went on to compete on Beat Bobby Flay and became a judge on Masterchef Tamil in India.
353	3	"Hot Doggin'"	Marc Murphy, Alex Guarnaschelli, and Amanda Freitag	August 14, 2016
Ingredients: Appetizer: alpaca hot dogs, sauerkraut, carrot ketchup, pâté; Entrée: wagyu beef hot dogs, quail eggs, watermelon radishes, canned chili; Dessert: corn dogs, coffee toffee, chocolate-covered jalapeños, deep-fried cookie dough; Contestants: Cameron Cain, Executive Chef from Houston, TX (eliminated after the appetizer); Seth Carter, Chef de Partie from San Francisco, CA (eliminated after the entrée); Rey Martinez, Executive Chef from Brooklyn, NY (eliminated after the dessert); Rachael Zavala, Executive Chef from Danville, CA (winner); Notes: In this episode, all baskets contained hot dogs in some form. In Round 1, Chef Seth forgot carrot ketchup in his dish but moved on due to his dish tasting better than his competitor. In Round 2, Chef Seth and Chef Rachael both forgot quail eggs in their dishes but Chef Seth was eliminated for repeating his mistake from Round 1. This episode was the first time two chefs forgot to plate the same basket ingredient in the same round.
354	4	"Souper Chefs"	Geoffrey Zakarian, Alex Guarnaschelli, and Christian Petroni	August 16, 2016
Ingredients: Appetizer: dill pickle soup, red watercress, lime curd, steelhead trout; Entrée: habanero beer, pork ribs, purple asparagus, fig dragées; Dessert: smoked brown sugar, baby pineapples, empanada dough, French single malt whiskey; Contestants: Donato Deserio, Executive Chef from New York, NY (eliminated after the appetizer); Pasquale Abbatiello, Executive Chef from Pleasantville, NY (eliminated after the entrée); Tariq Abdullah-Muhammad, Sous Chef from New York, NY (eliminated after the dessert); Veronica Flores, Executive Chef from New York, NY (winner)
355	5	"Chili Cook-Off"	Aarón Sánchez, Amanda Freitag, and Maneet Chauhan	August 21, 2016
Ingredients: Appetizer: pork cheek, kohlrabi, Mexican chocolate, chorizo; Entrée: boneless short ribs, spicy gummy peppers, choclo, smoked turkey wings; Dessert: jalebi, sweet/spicy cocktail sugar, habichuelas con dulce, roasted red peppers; Contestants: Jim Angelus, Chef & Restaurateur from San Francisco, CA (eliminated after the appetizer); Natacha Supplice, Private Chef from New York, NY (eliminated after the entrée); Eric Adjepong, Personal Chef & Entrepreneur from New York, NY (eliminated after the dessert); Matthew Arlington, Executive Chef & Restaurateur from Hoboken, NJ (winner); Notes: The chefs were required to create chili-themed dishes in each round.
356	6	"Teen Tournament: Battle 1"	Scott Conant, Alex Guarnaschelli, and Geoffrey Zakarian	August 23, 2016
Ingredients: Appetizer: waffle tacos, yogurt covered pretzels, broccolini, speck; Entrée: capon, purple cabbage, ranch dressing, pizza casserole; Dessert: banana split brownies, avocados, ribbon candy, wasabi peanuts; Contestants: Nicholas Capone (age 15), from Parsippany, NJ (eliminated after the appetizer); Myla Njai (age 15), from Queens, NY (eliminated after the entrée); Jared Goldberg (age 17), from Scarsdale, NY (eliminated after the dessert); Kamryn Kohler (age 16), from Yardley, PA (winner); Notes: Part 1 of a 5-part tournament featuring teenage cooks. For the whole tournament, the first round is 30 minutes instead of the usual 20.
357	7	"Teen Tournament: Battle 2"	Scott Conant, Marc Murphy, and Aarón Sánchez	August 30, 2016
Ingredients: Appetizer: saucisson en croute, quinoa, white harissa, seaweed salad; Entrée: squid, lemon candy, Kusa Squash, shrimp cocktail; Dessert: French pastries, citrus soda, strawberries, pirate's breakfast (eggs and bacon); Contestants: Nathan Spiro (age 17), from Bedford, NY (eliminated after the appetizer); Tommy McMonagle (age 17), from Swedesboro, NJ (eliminated after the entrée); Samantha Haas (age 16), from New York, NY (eliminated after the dessert); Lyanna Cintron (age 17), from Queens, NY (winner); Notes: Part 2 of a 5-part tournament featuring teenage cooks.
358	8	"Teen Tournament: Battle 3"	Scott Conant, Maneet Chauhan, and Aarón Sánchez	September 6, 2016
Ingredients: Appetizer: Korean short ribs, apple green tea coolers, Brussels sprouts, Gorgonzola dulce; Entrée: Skate wing, rainbow pasta, bok choy, Giardiniera; Dessert: Pate a choux, cherry tomatoes, balsamic jelly, chocolate milk; Contestants: Brittany Matteson (age 17), from Boyertown, PA (eliminated after the appetizer); Mukanjo Mukuka (age 17), from Valley Stream, NY (eliminated after the entrée); Remmi Smith (age 15), from Tulsa, OK (eliminated after the dessert); Gabriel Chirinos (age 15), from Jackson Heights, NY (winner); Notes: Part 3 of a 5-part tournament featuring teenage cooks.
359	9	"Twins for the Win"	Aarón Sánchez, Alex Guarnaschelli, and Marc Murphy	September 8, 2016
Ingredients: Appetizer: double-yolked eggs, pickled pork skins, broccoli rabe, crawfish tails; Entrée: peas in a pod, crown roast of pork, root beer float, Japanese sweet potatoes; Dessert: ya pears, fennel pollen, pate sucree, Brazil nuts; Contestants: Tammy Lakatos-Shames & Lyssie Lakatos, Nutritionists from New York, NY (eliminated after the appetizer); Pamela Drew & Wendy Drew, Chef & Restaurateurs from San Francisco, CA (eliminated after the entrée); Charlie Kalish & Michael Kalish, Instructors & Restaurateurs from San Francisco, CA (eliminated after the dessert); Matt Romine & Mike Romine, Chefs & Restaurateurs from Imlay City, MI (winner); Notes: This was a team competition featuring four teams of twin chefs. Aaron Sanchez' twin brother, Rodrigo Sanchez, made an appearance during the dessert round.
360	10	"Teen Tournament: Battle 4"	Scott Conant, Alex Guarnaschelli, and Amanda Freitag	September 13, 2016
Ingredients: Appetizer: porcini mushrooms, verjus, linzer torte cookies, rabbit in a can; Entrée: bison skirt steak, snap peas, guanciale, chocolate-covered potato chips; Dessert: seedless red grapes, building block candy, bee sting cake, sparkling cider; Contestants: Jeffrey Heilman (age 18), from San Jose, CA (eliminated after the appetizer); Jonas Park (age 16), from Ardsley, NY (eliminated after the entrée); Shawna DeLima (age 17), from Augusta, NJ (eliminated after the dessert); Eliana de Las Casas (age 15), from New Orleans, LA (winner); Notes: Part 4 of a 5-part tournament featuring teenage cooks.
361	11	"Naan the Wiser"	Scott Conant, Alex Guarnaschelli, and Marc Murphy	September 15, 2016
Ingredients: Appetizer: blood sausage, crosnes, cranberries, naan; Entrée: pad thai, oyster mushrooms, finger limes, dover sole; Dessert: guava, baby bananas, rum raisin chèvre, pistachio twists; Contestants: Surbhi Sahni, Business Owner & Chef from New York, NY (eliminated after the appetizer); Brittany Eaden, Business Owner & Chef from Houston, TX (eliminated after the entrée); Joel Lamica, Executive Chef from Berkeley, CA (eliminated after the dessert); Florian Wehrli, Executive Chef from New York, NY (winner)
362	12	"Teen Tournament: Finale Fight"	Scott Conant, Amanda Freitag, and Geoffrey Zakarian	September 20, 2016
Ingredients: Appetizer: mussels, cipollini onions, confetti popcorn, merguez sausage; Entrée: prime rib, funnel cakes, dried crabs, okra; Dessert: gelatin fish bowl, mangoes, graham crackers, cream cheese; Contestants: Gabriel Chirinos (age 15), from Jackson Heights, NY (eliminated after the appetizer); Lyanna Cintron (age 17), from Queens, NY (eliminated after the entrée); Kamryn Kohler (age 16), from Yardley, PA (eliminated after the dessert); Eliana de Las Casas (age 15), from New Orleans, LA (winner); Notes: Final part of a 5-part tournament featuring teenage cooks. The four remaining teen chefs competed for a $25,000 grand prize. The other three finalists each received a $1,000 FoodNetwork.com gift certificate and an authentic red Chopped chefs coat.
363	13	"Worst Cooks Challenge"	Anne Burrell, Scott Conant, and Chris Santos	September 27, 2016
Ingredients: Appetizer: frog legs, red finger chilies, bok choy, pig face roulade; Entrée: hanger steak, baby corn, tequila, lime curd; Dessert: bosc pears, black currant dijon, cocoa powder, brown sugar cinnamon pita chips; Contestants: Amber Brauner - Season 5 Winner (eliminated after the appetizer); Genique Freeman - Season 6 Runner-up (eliminated after the entrée); Kristen Redmond - Season 6 Winner (eliminated after the dessert); Jamie Thomas - Season 5 Runner-up (winner); Notes: Contestants were previous winners and runners-up from Worst Cooks in America. Anne Burrell served as the guest judge for this episode

=== Season 30 (2016) ===
No. overall	No. in season	Title	Judges	Original release date
364	1	"Kefir and Loathing"	Geoffrey Zakarian, Amanda Freitag, and Giorgio Rapicavoli	September 22, 2016
Ingredients: Appetizer: pork secreto, asparagus, kefir, truffle flavored potato chips; Entrée: black sea bass, yuca, flat runner beans, blueberry grappa; Dessert: knafeh, passion fruit, pistachio paste, brown bread in a can; Contestants: Enzo Neri, Executive Chef from New York City, NY. (eliminated after the appetizer); Soraya Carrington, Personal Chef & Caterer from New Jersey. (eliminated after the entrée); Erica Schaal, Private Chef & Caterer from San Francisco, CA. (eliminated after the dessert); Josh Arcilla, Corporate Caterer from San Francisco, CA. (winner); Notes: Guest judge Giorgio Rapicavoli is a two-time Chopped Champion.
365	2	"Sweetbread Dread"	Scott Conant, Maneet Chauhan, and Marc Murphy	September 29, 2016
Ingredients: Appetizer: vinegar pie, plantains, poblano peppers, sardines; Entrée: sweetbreads, daikon radishes, bok choy, dried scallops; Dessert: fresh bee pollen, canned white wine, edible flowers, cheddar biscuit mix; Contestants: Joey Malim, Line Cook from San Francisco, CA (eliminated after the appetizer); Alfred DiMartini, Hospital Executive Chef & Business Owner from New York, NY (eliminated after the entrée); Krista Espinal, Executive Chef from Peekskill, NY (eliminated after the dessert); Julieta Liebhoff, Executive Chef and Caterer from New York, NY (winner)
366	3	"Best Halloween Ever"	Maneet Chauhan, Amanda Freitag, and Scott Conant	October 3, 2016
Ingredients: Appetizer: zombie hand, dinosaur kale, ghost pepper mayo, jack o' lantern peppers; Entrée: bloodshot eyeballs, bone marrow, salty fingers, pork tenderloin; Dessert: goat cheese spider, candy corn cookies, worms in dirt, horned melon; Contestants: Ebony Amber, Costume Designer from Torrington, CT (eliminated after the appetizer); James Roberts, Medical File Clerk from Long Island, NY (eliminated after the entrée); Gina Gullo, University Research Assistant from Lehigh Valley, PA (eliminated after the dessert); Joshua Potter ("Schwa de Vivre"), Drag Queen from New York, NY (winner); Notes: This was a Halloween themed episode with all amateur cooks dressed in costumes. The zombie hand was meatloaf in the shape of a hand and mashed potatoes. The jack o' lantern peppers were orange bell peppers cut to resemble jack o' lanterns. The bloodshot eyeballs were dyed hard-boiled eggs. The salty fingers were sea beans. The worms in dirt were gummy worms and chocolate sandwich cookies.
367	4	"On the Quack Burner"	Marcus Samuelsson, Alex Guarnaschelli, and Scott Conant	October 6, 2016
Ingredients: Appetizer: pickled turnips, oroblanco, baba ganoush, duck tongues; Entrée: hanger steak, poached eggs, Italian cheese blend, wakame tagliatelle; Dessert: chocolate salted caramel licorice, spiced rum, cannoli cream, banana bread; Contestants: Thomas Brenner, Winemaker & Executive Chef from Napa Valley, CA (eliminated after the appetizer); Annabelle Turner, Executive Pastry Chef from Austin, TX (eliminated after the entrée); Anthony Rinaldi, Executive Chef & Owner from Brooklyn, NY (eliminated after the dessert); Heidi Rae Weinstein, Personal Chef from Melbourne, CA (winner)
368	5	"Web Stars"	Marcus Samuelsson, Alex Guarnaschelli, and Laura Vitale	October 11, 2016
Ingredients: Appetizer: emoji cookies, fennel, apricots, ground beef; Entrée: boar shoulder, sun-dried tomatoes, puff pastry, canned mac n cheese; Dessert: vanilla cake mix, lavender, Szechuan peppercorns, almond water; Contestants: Ameer Atari from "Epic Meal Time" (eliminated after the appetizer); Katie Quinn from "QKatie" (eliminated after the entrée); Noah Galuten from "The Food Feeder" (eliminated after the dessert); Jen Phanomrat from "Just Eat Life" (winner); Notes: The contestants were YouTubers who ran cooking shows on their YouTube channel.
369	6	"Turkey Day Heroes"	Scott Conant, Maneet Chauhan, and Marc Murphy	November 14, 2016
Ingredients: Appetizer: pumpkin pasta sauce, mache, pernil, turkey bread; Entrée: fried turkey, kabocha squash, candied cranberries, cherpumple; Dessert: black walnuts in syrup, beet yogurt, clementines, ear-of-corn cupcakes; Contestants: Amber Keyser, Noah's Kitchen in Houston, TX (eliminated after the appetizer); Pam Johnson, Elijah's Promise in New Brunswick, NJ (eliminated after the entrée); Adam Coleman, Clear Path for Veterans in Chittenango, NY (eliminated after the dessert); Alex Lawrence, Trinity/Food for the Homeless in New York, NY (winner); Notes: This is a Thanksgiving themed episode where all four contestants worked in soup kitchens. Each competitor received a donation from Food Network to their respective soup kitchens.
370	7	"Holiday Reality Check"	Scott Conant, Alex Guarnaschelli, and Aarón Sánchez	December 5, 2016
Ingredients: Appetizer: menorah bread, tomato mozzarella wreath, variegated radicchio, truffled pheasant; Entrée: matzo ball soup, venison tenderloin, Brussels sprouts, ugly sweater cookies; Dessert: ginger marshmallow men, advocaat, blood oranges, caramel chocolate dreidels; Contestants: Les Gold (eliminated after the appetizer); Jenni Pulos (eliminated after the entrée); Claudia Jordan (eliminated after the dessert); Karina Smirnoff (winner); Notes: This was a holiday themed episode. All four contestants were reality TV show stars competing for charity.
371	8	"New Year's Bash"	Scott Conant, Alex Guarnaschelli, and Aarón Sánchez	December 20, 2016
Ingredients: Appetizer: blini with caviar, collard greens, crab legs, champagne; Entrée: lobsters, black-eyed peas, dirty martini, boneless strip loin; Dessert: countdown cake, 12 grapes, pomegranates, edible party horns; Contestants: Javani King, Executive Chef from Houston, TX (eliminated after the appetizer); Lionel Haeberle, Executive Chef from San Francisco, CA (eliminated after the entrée); Matt Davidson, Chef de Cuisine fromSan Francisco, CA (eliminated after the dessert); Charleen Caabay, Chef & Restaurateur from Oakland, CA (winner); Notes: This was a New Year's themed episode. Due to the extensive prep time needed, the crab legs in the first basket were pre-cooked and pre-cracked.

=== Season 31 (2016) ===
- This is the first season where more than 13 episodes aired.

No. overall	No. in season	Title	Judges	Original release date
372	1	"Smorgastarta Your Engines"	Scott Conant, Amanda Freitag, and Aarón Sánchez	October 13, 2016
Ingredients: Appetizer: squid rings, fennel, chickpea miso, smörgåstårta; Entrée: pumpkin swordfish, beef tallow, strawberry milk powder, artichokes; Dessert: preserved eggplant, wafer sheets, ras el hanout, saturn peaches; Contestants: Sylvia Becker, Chef & Owner from Bloomfield, NJ (eliminated after the appetizer); Marc Quiñones, Executive Chef from Santa Fe, NM (eliminated after the entrée); Kristina Sciarra, Executive Chef from Bel Air, MD (eliminated after the dessert); Demetrio Zavala, Corporate Executive Chef from Washington D.C. (winner); Notes: Chef Quiñones competed on Season 19 of Gordon Ramsay's Hell's Kitchen, ranking in 8th place.
373	2	"Tailgate Greats"	Marc Murphy, Amanda Freitag, and Chris Santos	October 18, 2016
Ingredients: Appetizer: tailgate sandwiches, vegetables and dip, caramel corn, black bean salsa; Entrée: baby back ribs, brewmosa, hot Italian peppers, potato salad; Dessert: football pies, white nectarines, raspberry lambic beer, potato chips; Contestants: Ali Muhammad from Cranford, NJ (eliminated after the appetizer); Catherine Highland from Englewood, CO (eliminated after the entrée); Gina Gray from Ossining, NY (eliminated after the dessert); Frank West from Bayonne, NJ (winner); Notes: The theme of this episode was tailgating and the baskets were replaced by coolers. The contestants were amateur cooks and experienced tailgaters. Instead of the traditional chefs coats, the contestants wore specially made Chopped football jerseys. The contestants had 30 minutes in the appetizer round.
374	3	"Chopped: Beat Bobby Flay, Part 1"	Bobby Flay, Marc Murphy, and Chris Santos	October 20, 2016
Ingredients: Appetizer: lutefisk, mache, skordalia, crunchy berry cereal (Bobby's choice); Entrée: beets, rose water syrup, chocolate-covered onions, lamb short ribs (Bobby's choice); Dessert: wine flour, Mayhaw jelly, grilled cheese sandwiches, Marcona almonds (Bobby's choice); Contestants: Mackenzie Hilton (Episode 4.1 – "Rattle & Roll") (eliminated after the appetizer); Bradley Stellings (Episode 18.11 – "Beer Here!") and (Episode 23.3 – "Chopped Again!") (eliminated after the entrée); Jay Abrams (Episode 27.6 – "Bacon Boys") (eliminated after the dessert); Demetrio Zavala (Episode 31.1 – "Smorgastarta Your Engines") (advances to final round) (winner); Notes: First part of a 4-part tournament featuring twelve returning Chopped champions. Similar to the Chopped: Impossible tournament, each episode's winner progressed to the finale, where the three episode winners competed to determine the tournament finalist. The finalist would automatically win $15,000 and then choose a dish and compete against Bobby Flay in making a better version of the dish for a chance to win an additional $25,000. For the three preliminary episodes, one item in each basket was chosen by Bobby Flay.
375	4	"Midnight Snack Attack"	Maneet Chauhan, Amanda Freitag, and Aarón Sánchez	October 25, 2016
Ingredients: Appetizer: fried chicken, garlic scapes, Moscow mule, beet doughnuts; Entrée: blue foot mushrooms, pizza, duck fat fries, halal cart lamb & rice; Dessert: breakfast sandwich, fruit cereal, sour plums, rum butter ice cream; Contestants: Alexa Wilkinson, Executive Chef from New York, NY (eliminated after the appetizer); Mario Roca, Executive Chef from Washington D.C. (eliminated after the entrée); Alysis Vasquez, Chef & Owner from Jersey City, NJ (eliminated after the dessert); Lee Knoeppel, Executive Chef from New York, NY (winner); Notes: The theme for this episode was late-night food. Chef Alysis cut her finger in Round 3 which slowed her down.
376	5	"Chopped: Beat Bobby Flay, Part 2"	Bobby Flay, Amanda Freitag, and Scott Conant	October 27, 2016
Ingredients: Appetizer: tropical fruit in a can, Delfino cilantro, abalone, fresno peppers (Bobby's choice); Entrée: whole Alaskan king crab, purple snow peas, lemon ice box cake, corn nuts (Bobby's choice); Dessert: licorice flavored liqueur, plums, cinnamon bun pancakes, crème fraîche (Bobby's choice); Contestants: Shania Thomas (Episode 13.3 – "No Kidding!") (eliminated after the appetizer); Heather Borden (Episode 26.1 – "A Chopped Halloween") (eliminated after the entrée); Cory Morris (Episode 25.9 – "Bizarre Battle") (eliminated after the dessert); Seis Kamimura (Episode 24.11 – "Tailgate Fate") (advances to final round) (winner); Notes: Second part of a 4-part tournament. Chef Thomas is the youngest competitor in this tournament, having won the first all-teen episode back in season 13. In round 1, the can of fruit contained peaches, grapes, pears, and cherries. Also, due to the extensive prep time required, the abalone in round 1 was pre-cleaned.
377	6	"Chaudin Chow (aka Hearty Party)"	Chris Santos, Amanda Freitag, and Marc Murphy	November 1, 2016
Ingredients: Appetizer: chaudin, fresh green peas, sorghum, vodka sauce; Entrée: cobia, crenshaw melon, mezcal, tasso ham; Dessert: Thai rolled ice cream, strawberry papaya, croutons, honey & basil seed drink; Contestants: Josh Hershkovitz, Chef & Restaurateur from Baltimore, MD (eliminated after the appetizer); ML Carroll, Chef & Owner, Canapés Catering from Frederick, MD (eliminated after the entrée); Renee Blackman, Private Chef from New York, NY (eliminated after the dessert); Fernando Ruiz, Executive Chef from Santa Fe, NM (winner)
378	7	"Chopped: Beat Bobby Flay, Part 3"	Bobby Flay, Alex Guarnaschelli, and Aarón Sánchez	November 3, 2016
Ingredients: Appetizer: kale chips, gazpacho, mac & cheese stuffed lobster, zucchini (Bobby's choice); Entrée: white currants, egg-stuffed muffin, rainbow chard, goat leg (Bobby's choice); Dessert: Turkish cotton candy, chokladkolasnittar, "the ultimate milkshake", dates (Bobby's choice); Contestants: Mike Romine (Episode 29.9 – "Twins for the Win") (eliminated after the appetizer); Aarthi Sampath (Episode 29.2 – "Snail Snafus") (eliminated after the entrée); Matt Romine (Episode 29.9 – "Twins for the Win") (eliminated after the dessert); Kathy Fang (Episode 27.4 – "Chinese New Year") (winner); Notes: Third part of a 4-part tournament. Contestants Matt Romine and Mike Romine previously competed together in a twins' team competition episode, but competed individually in this episode. The "ultimate milkshake" in the third round was reminiscent of "unicorn milkshakes" that are overloaded with rainbow candies, rainbow cereal, and colorful cookies in a large mug.
379	8	"Cheap Eats"	Aarón Sánchez, Amanda Freitag, and Alex Guarnaschelli	November 8, 2016
Ingredients: Appetizer: pho, runner beans, Mexican street corn, pork buns; Entrée: ramen burgers, pickled nopales, zucchini blossoms, fried cheese curds; Dessert: lemon snack cakes, carrot hot sauce, plums, artisanal caramel; Contestants: Sage Beausejour, Sous Chef from New York, NY (eliminated after the appetizer); Kathy Poland, Chef & Food Truck Owner from Denver, CO (eliminated after the entrée); Shahin Afsharian, Executive Chef from Denver, CO (eliminated after the dessert); Nicky Palamaro, Sous Chef from New York, NY (winner); Notes: This episode featured inexpensive ingredients and foods in every basket. Chef Palamaro was a sous chef at Tertulia, owned by Chopped guest judge Seamus Mullen.
380	9	"Chopped: Beat Bobby Flay, Finale"	Amanda Freitag, Alex Guarnaschelli, and Chris Santos	November 10, 2016
Ingredients: Appetizer: slaw sauce, coconut candy, chickpeas, camel tenderloin; Entrée: molasses, haricot verts, breakfast nachos, eel; Dessert: (wild card round) ribeye steak, black garlic, fish maw, piña colada; Contestants: Kathy Fang (Episode 27.4 – "Chinese New Year") (eliminated after the appetizer); Demetrio Zavala (Episode 31.1 – "Smorgastarta Your Engines") (eliminated after the entrée); Seis Kamimura (Episode 24.11 – "Tailgate Fate") (eliminated after the dessert); Bobby Flay (winner); Notes: Final part of a 4-part tournament. The 3 finalists competed over 2 rounds (appetizer and entree) to win a guaranteed $15,000. The winner faced Bobby Flay in a $25,000 wild card round for a chance to increase their winnings to $40,000. This round was played like the second round on Beat Bobby Flay with both chefs making a dish of the winner's choice, which in this case was bibimbap. The chefs had 45 minutes in the 3rd round instead of the usual 30 to accommodate the crossover format.
381	10	"Battle of the Butchers"	Aarón Sánchez, Chris Santos, and Scott Conant	November 17, 2016
Ingredients: Appetizer: picnic pork shoulder, heirloom tomatoes, dried porcini mushrooms, head cheese; Entrée: goose, rat tail radishes, cornichons, pork rillettes; Dessert: pork blood ice cream, peaches, duck fat buttermilk biscuits, marrow bones; Contestants: Jay Fox, Butcher & Co-Owner from New York, NY (eliminated after the appetizer); Brian Paul Casey, Butcher & Co-Owner from Denver, CO (eliminated after the entrée); Derek Boaz, Master Butcher from Philadelphia, PA (eliminated after the dessert); Cara Nicoletti, Butcher from Brooklyn, NY (winner); Notes: All four chefs were professional butchers. The chefs were given 30 minutes in the appetizer round and 40 minute in the entrée round in order to butcher their proteins properly.
382	11	"Beast Feast"	Scott Conant, Alex Guarnaschelli, and Maneet Chauhan	November 22, 2016
Ingredients: Appetizer: sekacz, kale, chicken livers, chicken-on-a-spit; Entrée: white chocolate curry cashews, butternut squash, goat’s milk yogurt, whole goats; Dessert: marrow chutney, figs, bacon, whole pigs; Contestants: Jared Falco, Chef de Cuisine from Armonk, NY (eliminated after the appetizer); Sarah Murray, Sous Chef from Baltimore, MD (eliminated after the entrée); Brother Luck, Chef & Owner from Colorado Springs, CO (eliminated after the dessert); Christopher Royster, Chef de Cuisine from Boulder, CO (winner); Notes: Every basket contained whole roasted animals which were placed in the pantry rather than the baskets due to their size. Chef Jared works for Chopped champion and occasional guest judge Christian Petroni. In round 1, Chef Sarah forgot to plate the sekacz on her dish, but moved on because they judged Chef Jared's dish on presentation, taste, and creativity with being poorly plated and that it just didn't come together, as cited by the judges.
383	12	"Back in Time"	Amanda Freitag, Alex Guarnaschelli, and Aarón Sánchez	November 24, 2016
Ingredients: Appetizer: spiced ham in a can, crab aspic molds, orange space drink, spinach; Entrée: TV dinners, flying saucer candies, cheese ball, lima beans; Dessert: marshmallow sandwich pie, ambrosia, powdered milk, Shirley Temple; Contestants: Peter Freeman, Chef & Owner from Brooklyn, NY (eliminated after the appetizer); Connie Ruel, Chef & Owner from Broomfield, CO (eliminated after the entrée); Geoff "Ozzy" Carson, Kitchen Manager from Chester, VA (eliminated after the dessert); Crystal River Williams, Chef & Owner from Queens, NY (winner); Notes: The theme of this episode was retro-inspired food. All the basket contained old-fashioned ingredients.
384	13	"Viewers' Vengeance"	Chris Santos, Geoffrey Zakarian, and Marc Murphy	November 29, 2016
Ingredients: Appetizer: duck blood soup, horseradish pickles, frilly red mustard greens, zombie hand; Entrée: elk heart, macapuno, Scotch Bonnet peppers, Tavuk göğsü; Dessert: atole, horned melon, salted dried plums, pig tails; Contestants: Erick Dally, Executive Sous Chef from New York, NY (eliminated after the appetizer); Serge Pambo, Sous Chef from Rockville, MD (eliminated after the entrée); Ashish "Al" Alfred, Executive Chef & Restaurateur from Bethesda, MD (eliminated after the dessert); Lesley Covitz, Chef & Restaurateur from Brooklyn, NY (winner); Notes: This was a viewers' choice episode. The basket ingredients were chosen by fans via social media. The zombie hand was meatloaf in the shape of a hand and mashed potatoes.
385	14	"Entree Basket Blues"	Marcus Samuelsson, Geoffrey Zakarian, and Leah Cohen	December 1, 2016
Ingredients: Appetizer: canned ham musubi, hon shimeji mushrooms, mussels, passion fruit; Entrée: porcelet rib rack, honeydew melon, mache, blue curacao; Dessert: french fry chips, dragon fruit, ham glaze, blackberries; Contestants: Christopher Newark, Sous Chef from Annapolis, MD (eliminated after the appetizer); Treeven Dove, Sous Chef from Washington D.C. (eliminated after the entrée); Tressa Wiles, Pastry Chef from Washington D.C. (eliminated after the dessert); Michael Bonk, Chef & Restaurateur from Washington D.C. (winner); Notes: This episode was mistakenly labelled as "Jump for Bok Choy" on the Food Network website.
386	15	"Taco Time!"	Aarón Sánchez, Alex Guarnaschelli, and Marc Murphy	December 8, 2016
Ingredients: Appetizer: tripe, oranges, mustard rabe, coffee-flavored liqueur; Entrée: pork shoulder, baby watermelon, hearts of palm, hoisin sauce; Dessert: churro cake, goat's milk, serrano peppers, Mexican chocolate; Contestants: Elena Cruz, Chef & Co-Owner from Kingston, NY. (eliminated after the appetizer); David Ruiz, Executive Chef from Albuquerque, NM. (eliminated after the entrée); Jesse Vega, Executive Chef from Denver, CO. (eliminated after the dessert); Faith Paulick, Executive Chef from Baltimore, MD. (winner); Notes: For this episode, the chefs had to make tacos in every round. Chef Elena forgot an ingredient in the first round (tripe) which led to her being eliminated.
387	16	"Sweet Heat"	Geoffrey Zakarian, Alex Guarnaschelli, and Chris Santos	December 13, 2016
Ingredients: Appetizer: pizza rustica, radicchio, sardines, lemon candies; Entrée: baby octopus, Italian orange liqueur, caperberries, ham steaks; Dessert: brown butter, blueberry crumb cake, serrano chiles, salt water taffy; Contestants: Paddy Rawal, Chef & Owner from Santa Fe, NM. (eliminated after the appetizer); Christina Hinds, Executive Chef from Bayonne, NJ. (eliminated after the entrée); Catherine O'Brien, Chef & Owner from Santa Fe, NM. (eliminated after the dessert); Dante Giannini, Estate Chef for Jimmy Buffett. (winner)
388	17	"Betting on the Farm"	Marc Murphy, Amanda Freitag, and Chris Santos	December 15, 2016
Ingredients: Appetizer: local chickens, pickled chilis, baby squash with blossoms, switchel; Entrée: grass-fed lamb shoulder, polenta, gummy farm animals, wild arugula; Dessert: corn on the cob ice cream, gooseberries, goat's milk, farm fresh duck eggs; Contestants: Marjory Sweet, Farmer and Chef from Albuquerque, NM (eliminated after the appetizer); Jhette Gonzales, Chef de Partie from Albuquerque, NM (eliminated after the entrée); Brian Cieslak, Line Cook from Annapolis, MD (eliminated after the dessert); Martyna Krowicka, Chef de Cuisine from Hamburg, NJ (winner); Notes: All the chefs worked at farm-to-table style restaurants and the basket ingredients leaned towards local or farm-themed foods.
389	18	"Million Dollar Baskets"	Marcus Samuelsson, Alex Guarnaschelli, and Maneet Chauhan	December 22, 2016
Ingredients: Appetizer: flight of caviar, dried matsutake mushrooms, purple asparagus, hamachi; Entrée: summer black truffles, pure maple syrup, broccoflower, mangalitsa pork; Dessert: macadamias, pear brandy, champagne grapes, gold doughnuts; Contestants: Faiz Ally, Executive Sous Chef from Washington D.C (eliminated after the appetizer); Ivan Saez, Executive Chef from Washington D.C (eliminated after the entrée); Meena Throngkumpola, Executive Sous Chef from New York, NY (eliminated after the dessert); Nick Browne, Private Chef from Berkshires, MA (winner); Notes: Each chef specialized in high-end cuisine and each basket contained expensive, high-end ingredients. The flight of caviar in the first round contained three different varieties of caviar for the chefs to use. Chef Nick Browne is the son of actors Kale Browne and Karen Allen.
390	19	"Basket Buzz"	Marc Murphy, Geoffrey Zakarian, and Dale Talde	December 27, 2016
Ingredients: Appetizer: branzino, cucamelon, cava, testaroli pasta; Entrée: lamb couscous, white eggplant, chewy cinnamon candies, gorgonzola dulce; Dessert: grape leaves, wild blueberries, tahini ice cream, cherry gel candy; Contestants: Lien Lin, Executive Chef from Brooklyn, NY (eliminated after the appetizer); Brendan Neville, Executive Chef from New York City, NY (eliminated after the entrée); Renée Fox, Chef & Restaurateur from Santa Fe, NM (eliminated after the dessert); Maria Petridis, Chef and Restaurateur from Queens, NY (winner)
391	20	"Wild Times"	Chris Santos, Alex Guarnaschelli, and Jonathon Sawyer	December 29, 2016
Ingredients: Appetizer: venison loin, fennel flowers, huckleberry jam, kelp noodles; Entrée: wild boar, dandelion greens, wildflower honey, burdock root; Dessert: mushroom hot chocolate, cranberries, amaranth grain, buffalo milk butter; Contestants: Michele Wright, Chef & Restaurateur from Goochland, VA (eliminated after the appetizer); Justin Goerich, Executive Chef from Boulder, CO (eliminated after the entrée); Peter Martinez, Sous Chef from Englewood Cliffs, NJ (eliminated after the dessert); Mark Henry, Executive Chef from Fountain, CO (winner); Notes: Each basket had wild ingredients (game and/or wild plants). Guest judge Jonathon Sawyer was the Chopped champion from the "Grill Masters Napa: Part 1" episode.

=== Season 32 (2017) ===
No. overall	No. in season	Title	Judges	Original release date
392	1	"Clean Eatin'"	Marc Murphy, Amanda Freitag, and Chris Santos	January 3, 2017
Ingredients: Appetizer: muffin tops, Russian red kale, soaked beans, whole milk yogurt; Entrée: side of tuna, stonecrop, kombucha, shirataki noodles; Dessert: banana chocolate frozen dessert, raspberries, kaniwa, angel food cake; Contestants: Elisa Lyew, Chef & Restaurateur from Brooklyn, NY (eliminated after the appetizer); Melanie Brown-Lane, Executive Chef from Baltimore, MD (eliminated after the entrée); Rick Vanderplas, Private Chef & Owner from New York, NY (eliminated after the dessert); Adam Kenworthy, Private Chef from New York, NY (winner); Notes: The baskets featured healthy, fresh ingredients and the contestants had to cook healthy, low-calorie meals in every round.
393	2	"Whiskey and Wings"	Aarón Sánchez, Geoffrey Zakarian, and Chris Santos	January 10, 2017
Ingredients: Appetizer: chicken wings, curly fries, Chinese broccoli, Japanese whiskey; Entrée: (pre-cooked) turkey wings, hot sauces, (platter of) celery, carrots, & blue cheese, quinoa whiskey; Dessert: angel wings, peaches, braised bacon, Rock & Rye; Contestants: Russell Stippich, Sous Chef from Denver, CO (eliminated after the appetizer); Chris Burnett, Head Sous Chef from Little Silver, NJ (eliminated after the entrée); Dasha Perez-Haney, Executive Chef from Denver, CO (eliminated after the dessert); Scott McDonald, Executive Chef from Jersey City, NJ (winner); Notes: Each basket contained different types of whiskey and wings. In the entree round the chefs were given a caddy of five different hot sauces, and the celery, carrots, and blue cheese were all on a platter which counted as one ingredient.
394	3	"Celebrating Veterans"	Chris Santos, Alex Guarnaschelli, and Marc Murphy	January 17, 2017
Ingredients: Appetizer: cheeseburgers, haricot verts, potato tots, sweet tea; Entrée: chicken pot pie, watercress, pork chops, "stars & stripes" pasta; Dessert: candy apples, blondies, vanilla pudding mix, American cheese; Contestants: Paul Maloney, Executive Chef and Navy Veteran from Doswell, VA (eliminated after the appetizer); Candace Gracik, Executive Chef and Coast Guard Veteran from Los Lunas, NM (eliminated after the entrée); Jon Coombs, Sous Chef and Army Veteran from Ashburn, VA (eliminated after the dessert); Gary Gonzalez, Line Cook and Marine Veteran from Edison, NJ (winner); Notes: All four contestants were military veterans. While Chopped normally obscures brand names, the pot pie in the entrée basket was Marie Callender's brand. Each of the chopped chefs had $5000 donated in their name from Marie Callender's to a different charity. The winner also received a $10,000 donation to charity in addition to the usual $10,000 prize.
395	4	"Oodles of Noodles"	Chris Santos, Geoffrey Zakarian, and Marcus Samuelsson	January 24, 2017
Ingredients: Appetizer: tilefish, roasted grapes, Chinese preserved vegetables, Yakisoba noodles; Entrée: (platter of) sausage & meatballs, chayote squash, tomato sorbet, fresh pasta dough; Dessert: struffoli, maraschino cherries, cinnamon whisky, falooda ice cream; Contestants: Cristian Petitta, Executive Chef from White Plains, NY (eliminated after the appetizer); Thach Tran, Executive Chef from Denver, CO (eliminated after the entrée); Zack Mills, Executive Chef from Baltimore, MD (eliminated after the dessert); Christina Jackson, Chef from Brooklyn, NY (winner); Notes: This was a noodle themed episode with noodles/pasta in every round. Chef Cristian cut himself in the first round and had to start his dish over with less fish. The sausage and meatballs were all on a platter which counted as one ingredient.
396	5	"Game Day Party"	Scott Conant, Geoffrey Zakarian, and Eddie Jackson	January 31, 2017
Ingredients: Appetizer: truffled mac & cheese, spigarello, pale ale, sliders; Entrée: purple potatoes, sangria artichokes, mortadella hot dogs, chili; Dessert: soft pretzels, husk cherries, blue sports drink, pig skin; Contestants: Jon "DJ Dallas Green" Rosa, Caterer & DJ from Harlem, NY (eliminated after the appetizer); Dean Dupuis, Executive Chef from Washington D.C (eliminated after the entrée); Pete Santero, Culinary Arts Teacher from Passaic County, NJ (eliminated after the dessert); Carrie Eagle, Executive Chef from Albuquerque, NM (winner); Notes: The baskets were game day (American Football) themed.
397	6	"Chocolate Obsession"	Maneet Chauhan, Katrina Markoff, and Zac Young	February 7, 2017
Ingredients: Appetizer: soft-shell crabs, chocolate olive oil, pomegranate seeds, white chocolate-covered caviar; Entrée: milk chocolate mille crêpe cake, chocolate whiskey, pork shanks, purple spinach; Dessert: dark chocolate decadence cake, dark chocolate seaweed candy, pistachio cream, apricots; Contestants: Jenny Dorsey, Chef from New York, NY (eliminated after the appetizer); Arnaud Devulder, Events Chef from New York, NY (eliminated after the entrée); Doug Wetzel, Executive Chef from Baltimore, MD (eliminated after the dessert); Brooke Siem, Pastry Chef & Restaurateur from New York, NY (winner); Notes: The theme of this episode was chocolate in every round with two chocolate ingredients in every basket.
398	7	"Blue Plate Fate"	Marc Murphy, Amanda Freitag, and Chris Santos	February 14, 2017
Ingredients: Appetizer: BLTs, marionberry jam, string beans, disco fries; Entrée: cube steak, beets, craft beer, deep-fried deviled eggs; Dessert: coconut arancini, variegated figs, cheesecake, coffee with creamer; Contestants: Arleen Harkins, Executive Chef & Owner from Red Hook, NY (eliminated after the appetizer); Nonna Riekert, Chef from Collingswood, NJ (eliminated after the entrée); Mike Perseo, Executive Chef from Albuquerque, NM (eliminated after the dessert); Ype Von Hengst, Chef & Restaurateur from Rockville, MD (winner); Notes: The theme of this episode was diner-style food and all four contestants were diner chefs.
399	8	"Chefs in a Pickle"	Geoffrey Zakarian, Alex Guarnaschelli, and Chris Santos	February 21, 2017
Ingredients: Appetizer: sliced pickled pork, Brussels sprouts, pickleback, clotted cream; Entrée: flank steak, half-sour pickles, perilla leaves, rainbow carrots; Dessert: bread-and-butter pickles, pretzel croissants, chunky peanut butter, cherries; Contestants: Mandla Nkiwane, Executive Chef from New York, NY (eliminated after the appetizer); Brian Hohl, Sous Chef from Annapolis, MD (eliminated after the entrée); Jaclyn Beasley, Executive Sous Chef from Washington, D.C (eliminated after the dessert); Dave Hadley, Sous Chef from Denver, CO (winner); Notes: This episode had pickled ingredients in every basket.
400	9	"Raw Deal"	Chris Santos, Amanda Freitag, and Maneet Chauhan	February 28, 2017
Ingredients: Appetizer: sushi burgers, fresh wasabi, longan berries, pork floss; Entrée: buffalo top sirloin steaks, porcini mushrooms, ají dulce, sea buckthorn juice; Dessert: polenta cake, béchamel sauce, plums, pink Himalayan sea salt; Contestants: Steven Londoño, Sous Chef, Milk River from Brooklyn, NY (eliminated after the appetizer); MiKala Brennan, Chef and Owner, Hula Girl Bar and Grill from Arlington, VA (eliminated after the entrée); Timothy Walker, Executive Chef, P.J Clarks and Sidecar from New York, NY (eliminated after the dessert); Marie Yniguez, Chef and Restaurateur, Bocadillos, Albuquerque, NM (winner); Notes: The buffalo steaks in round 2 were given to the chefs as a whole sirloin roast. Chef Yniguez later competed on Guy's Grocery Games and The Great Food Truck Race.
401	10	"Something Dumpling"	Chris Santos, Geoffrey Zakarian, and Aarón Sánchez	March 7, 2017
Ingredients: Appetizer: pork belly, savoy cabbage, black walnuts in syrup, red yuzu kosho; Entrée: ground lamb, mashed potatoes, Swiss chard, dried kiwi; Dessert: sriracha potato chips, farmer's cheese, rambutan, ginger shrub; Contestants: Mauro Maccioni, Chef and Co-Owner from New York, NY (eliminated after the appetizer); Naji Boustany, Executive Chef from New York, NY (eliminated after the entrée); Jackie Jeong, Chef de Cuisine from New York, NY (eliminated after the dessert); Andrew Riccatelli, Chef de Cuisine from New York, NY (winner); Notes: All the chefs were from New York. They were required to make dumplings in every round. To accommodate the theme, each chef was provided with a preheated pot of oil and the pantry was stocked with assorted dumpling wrappers. In the appetizer round, Chef Mauro didn't get any food onto his plates and though the judges tried the food in his pans, he was eliminated (making this the second time in the series that a contestant didn't plate anything before time ran out.)
402	11	"Latin Cuisine Dream"	Chris Santos, Geoffrey Zakarian, and James Tahhan	March 14, 2017
Ingredients: Appetizer: sancocho, lulo, blue masa dough, chicharrón de cerdo; Entrée: stewing hens, pinto beans, alfajores, yuca; Dessert: yellow rice, candy-covered peanuts, mangos, coquito; Contestants: (Peru) Miguel Samanez, Sous Chef from New York, NY (eliminated after the appetizer); (Brazil) Val Wasilewski, Executive Pastry Chef from Briarcliff Manor, NY (eliminated after the entrée); (Brazil) George Rodrigues, Executive Chef from Washington D.C. (eliminated after the dessert); (Venezuela) Adriana Urbina, Chef and Owner from New York, NY (winner); Notes: This episode featured chefs from different Latin American countries who emigrated to the United States. There were also Latin American ingredients in each basket.
403	12	"Jump for Bok Choy"	Scott Conant, Alex Guarnaschelli, and Chris Santos	May 2, 2017
Ingredients: Appetizer: toybox eggplant, mission figs, sweetened condensed milk, matambre; Entrée: hamachi collar, bok choy, grass jelly drink, watermelon feta salad; Dessert: tofu sheets, baked lemon ricotta, blackberries, lavender salt; Contestants: T.J. Ingraham, Chef & Restaurateur from Boulder, CO (eliminated after the appetizer); Judee Obcena, Chef de Partie from New York, NY (eliminated after the entrée); James Horn, Director of Operations from New York, NY (eliminated after the dessert); Frida Karani, Executive Chef from Washington D.C. (winner)

=== Season 33 (2017) ===
No. overall	No. in season	Title	Judges	Original release date
404	1	"Best Laid Pans"	Marcus Samuelsson, Maneet Chauhan, and Geoffrey Zakarian	March 21, 2017
Ingredients: Appetizer: duck and armagnac sausage, mixed berry applesauce, leeks, okra; Entrée: spaghetti pie, tomatillos, coulotte steak, burrata cheese; Dessert: trifle, Thai chili peppers, orange blossom water, anjou pears; Contestants: Jennifer Lopez, Executive Chef from Washington D.C (eliminated after the appetizer); Carolina Saavedra, Sous Chef from Bronx, New York (eliminated after the entrée); Sophia Manatakis, Executive Chef from New York, NY (eliminated after the dessert); Heather Carr, Sous Chef from Denver, CO (winner); Notes: All four contestants were women.
405	2	"Star Power: Web Stars!"	Geoffrey Zakarian, Amanda Freitag, and Scott Conant	March 28, 2017
Ingredients: Appetizer: blood sausage, shishito peppers, Japanese mayonnaise, dates; Entrée: duck breast, broccoli rabe, mashed potato pancakes, Thai iced tea; Dessert: mango mochi ice cream, quince paste, instant oatmeal packets, dragon fruit; Contestants: Justine Ezarik (eliminated after the appetizer); Hilah Johnson (eliminated after the entrée); Josh Elkin (eliminated after the dessert); Lazarus Lynch (winner); Notes: Part 1 of a 5-part celebrity tournament featuring 16 celebrities competing to win $50,000 for charity. Contestants in this heat were internet personalities with a considerable online following.
406	3	"Star Power: Culinary Muscle!"	Scott Conant, Alex Guarnaschelli, and Eddie Jackson	April 4, 2017
Ingredients: Appetizer: wagyu ground beef, Swiss chard, eggplant rollatini, ranch dressing soda; Entrée: lamb noisette roast, avocados, za’atar bread, frozen mint lemonade; Dessert: rice pudding-stuffed brioche, blood oranges, protein powder balls, strawberry rock candy; Contestants: LaMarr Woodley (eliminated after the appetizer); Mariel Zagunis (eliminated after the entrée); Dorothy Hamill (eliminated after the dessert); Paige VanZant (winner); Notes: Part 2 of a 5-part celebrity tournament. Contestants in this heat were current and former athletes.
407	4	"Star Power: The Last Laugh!"	Scott Conant, Amanda Freitag, and Marc Murphy	April 11, 2017
Ingredients: Appetizer: Jonah crab claws, sweet piquante peppers, asparagus, arepas; Entrée: New York strip steaks, Brussels sprouts, marshmallows, potato tot poutine; Dessert: smoked chili honey, cinnamon roll dough, strawberries, White Russian; Contestants: Ron Funches (eliminated after the appetizer); Illeana Douglas (eliminated after the entrée); Julie White (eliminated after the dessert); Jonathan Sadowski (winner); Notes: Part 3 of a 5-part celebrity tournament. Contestants in this heat were all comedians.
408	5	"Star Power: Screen Sensations!"	Marcus Samuelsson, Amanda Freitag, and Scott Conant	April 18, 2017
Ingredients: Appetizer: striped bass fillets, squash purée, microgreens, passion fruit ice pops; Entrée: chicken kebobs, pickled gooseberries, purple cauliflower, truffle popcorn; Dessert: financiers, blueberries, candied fruit slices, statuette lollipops; Contestants: Alan Thicke (eliminated after the appetizer); Alysia Reiner (eliminated after the entrée); Rick Fox (eliminated after the dessert); Jodi Lyn O'Keefe (winner); Notes: Part 4 of a 5-part celebrity tournament. Contestants in this heat were film and television actors. This episode marks Alan Thicke's final television appearance, as he died prior to the airing of this episode. A tribute was included to him at the end.
409	6	"Star Power: Grand Finale"	Geoffrey Zakarian, Alex Guarnaschelli, and Scott Conant	April 25, 2017
Ingredients: Appetizer: lobster tails, leaf lettuce iceberg, star fruit, cinnamon toaster pastries; Entrée: yuca chips, bitter melon, brandy, swineapple; Dessert: macarons, soursop, drinkable yogurt, pistachios; Contestants: Paige VanZant (eliminated after the appetizer); Jodi Lyn O'Keefe (eliminated after the entrée); Jonathan Sadowski (eliminated after the dessert); Lazarus Lynch (winner); Notes: Part 5 of a 5-part celebrity tournament. The swineapple in the second round was a pineapple stuffed with ribs and covered in bacon.
410	7	"The Newlywed Game"	Marc Murphy, Amanda Freitag, and Geoffrey Zakarian	May 16, 2017
Ingredients: Appetizer: manila clams, romanesco, lamb merguez, champagne toast; Entrée: pork tenderloin, piccalilli, cranberry shelling beans, wedding rice; Dessert: port wine cheese, sweet flakes cereal, plumcots, wedding cake top; Contestants: Ralph Ferrara and Toni Ferrara from Brick, NJ (eliminated after the appetizer); Henry Hynoski and Laura Hynoski from Secaucus NJ (eliminated after the entrée); Jhonathan Fennell and Corry Fennell from Philadelphia, PA (eliminated after the dessert); Kam Khazai and Karen Khazai from Gaithersburg, MD (winner); Notes: This was a team competition with newlyweds (home cooks) competing in the Chopped kitchen. Henry Hynoski was a member of the Super Bowl XLVI-winning team New York Giants.
411	8	"An Ugly Turn"	Marc Murphy, Amanda Freitag, and Jonathon Sawyer	May 30, 2017
Ingredients: Appetizer: shrimp heads and shells, stale bagels, black velvet tomatoes, gnarled carrots; Entrée: dogfish, radish tops, beef tallow candles, twisted cucumbers; Dessert: whipped aquafaba, burnt chocolate chip cookies, cacao beans with pulp, brown bananas; Contestants: Mauricio Nunez, Chef de Cuisine from Mount Kisco, NY (eliminated after the appetizer); Miranda Rosenfelt, Chef de Cuisine from Washington, DC (eliminated after the entrée); Jordan Lloyd, Executive Chef & Restaurateur from Easton, MD (eliminated after the dessert); Nicolas Ferreira, Private Chef from New York, NY (winner); Notes: The chefs had to work with ugly ingredients in every basket. Guest judge Jonathon Sawyer was a finalist in Chopped: Grill Masters Napa.

=== Season 34 (2017) ===
No. overall	No. in season	Title	Judges	Original release date
412	1	"Thanks, Mom!"	Marc Murphy, Amanda Freitag, and Marcus Samuelsson	May 9, 2017
Ingredients: Appetizer: duck breast, baby turnips, quail eggs, rose bud tea; Entrée: red snapper, guanciale, sunflower seeds, sorrento lemons; Dessert: rhubarb, walnuts, madeleines, blood oranges; Contestants: Jeff and Pam Mauro (Charity: University of Chicago Medicine Comer Children's Hospital) (eliminated after the appetizer); Ted and Donna Allen (Charity: Spina Bifida Association) (eliminated after the entrée); Jet and Mary Tila (Charity: K9s for Warriors) (eliminated after the dessert); Chris and Mary Lou Santos (Charity: Rett Syndrome Research Trust) (winner); Notes: The contestants were Food Network chefs (and Chopped host Ted Allen) competing alongside their mothers for charity. Since Ted Allen was one of the contestants, the judges took turns performing his hosting duties and unveiling who got chopped each round (Marc announced round 1, Marcus announced round 2, and Amanda announced round 3). The chefs had 30 minutes in the appetizer round instead of the usual 20.
413	2	"Grill Game"	Marc Murphy, Amanda Freitag, and Maneet Chauhan	May 23, 2017
Ingredients: Appetizer: longaniza, grilled stuffed onions, asparagus, frozen cherry daiquiri; Entrée: venison rib rack, charred caprese sandwich, baby corn, meat sauce; Dessert: roasted marshmallow shots, figs, almonds, grilled peaches and cream cake; Contestants: Erin Campbell, Competitive BBQ Champ from Yazoo City, MS (eliminated after the appetizer); Shane Vidovic, Chef and Restaurateur from Lakewood, OH (eliminated after the entrée); Eusebio Gongora, Culinary Director from Baton Rouge, LA (eliminated after the dessert); Tanya Cauthen, Butcher from Richmond, VA (winner); Notes: This was a grilling themed episode. The ovens were turned off and the stovetops were outfitted with grill pans and griddles. While Chopped normally obscures brand names, the meat sauce in the entree basket was A1 Steak Sauce, a product of a Chopped sponsor. Chef Campbell is the daughter of Leslie Roark Scott, a finalist in the second Chopped: Grill Masters Tournament.
414	3	"Greater Tater"	Marcus Samuelsson, Amanda Freitag, and Ali Khan	June 6, 2017
Ingredients: Appetizer: purple potatoes, potato tots, garlic chives, Canadian bacon; Entrée: Kennebec potatoes, chili cheese fries, porterhouse steaks, fresh wasabi; Dessert: loaded baked potatoes, sweet potato pie, dried cranberries, English toffee; Contestants: Bea Rocchetti, Sous Chef from Farmington Hills, MI (eliminated after the appetizer); Miguel Franco, Executive Chef from New York, NY (eliminated after the entrée); Michael Chatman, Line Cook from New York, NY (eliminated after the dessert); Shacafrica Simmons, Caterer from Tallahassee, FL (winner); Notes: The theme of this episode was potatoes, which were featured in two forms in every basket. Chef Chatman was a line cook for Chopped judge Alex Guarneschelli.
415	4	"Father's Day"	Scott Conant, Amanda Freitag, and Marc Murphy	June 13, 2017
Ingredients: Appetizer: ground beef, Japanese eggplant, date syrup, remote control cookie; Entrée: salmon fillet, candy cane beets, cassava sticks, fava beans; Dessert: bacon gelato, Belgian ale, cactus pear, pretzel bark; Contestants: Mike Hannah and Melissa Hannah from Cleveland, OH (eliminated after the appetizer); Mark Sheridan and Kevin Sheridan from Cleveland, OH (eliminated after the entrée); Johnny Hall and Yahaira Hall from Brooklyn, NY (eliminated after the dessert); Sabi Bivas and Daniel Bivas from Hillsborough, NJ (winner); Notes: This was a home cook, team competition; four fathers paired up with their adult children. The teams were given 30 minutes in the appetizer round instead of the usual 20.
416	5	"Got Your Goat?"	Scott Conant, Amanda Freitag, and Alex Guarnaschelli	June 20, 2017
Ingredients: Appetizer: crawfish tails, peas, processed cheese, vegetable-infused vodka; Entrée: goat chops, petite garlic with greens, pickled string beans, root beer barrel candy; Dessert: zucchini, caramel popcorn with peanuts, yuzu juice, manchego cheese; Contestants: Greg Power, Executive Chef from New York, NY (eliminated after the appetizer); Ashley Jonique, Private Chef from New Orleans, LA (eliminated after the entrée); Felix Castro, Executive Pastry Chef from New York, NY (eliminated after the dessert); Scott Maki, Executive Chef from New Orleans, LA (winner)
417	6	"Snap Pea to It!"	Scott Conant, Alex Guarnaschelli, and Marcus Samuelsson	June 27, 2017
Ingredients: Appetizer: lamb kebabs, pomegranate juice, Chinese broccoli, avocado toast; Entrée: Cornish hens, black rice, snap peas, watermelon radish; Dessert: olive oil cake, papaya, kiwi, kefir; Contestants: Jimmie Rondon, Sous Chef from New York, NY (eliminated after the appetizer); Allie Lyttle, Chef from Detroit, MI (eliminated after the entrée); Willy Anderson, Caterer from Brooklyn, NY (eliminated after the dessert); Charly Pierre, Chef and Co-Owner from New Orleans, LA (winner); Notes: While Chopped normally obscures brand names, the pomegranate juice in the appetizer round was POM Wonderful, a product of a Chopped sponsor.
418	7	"Bangin' Backyard Cookout"	Scott Conant, Alex Guarnaschelli, and Elizabeth Heiskell	July 4, 2017
Ingredients: Appetizer: burger-wrapped hot dogs, half-sour pickles, kasundi, macaroni salad; Entrée: beer-can chicken, eggplant, double-smoked bacon, classic burger fixings; Dessert: watermelon grill, corn chips, strawberry shortcake, sweet tea vodka; Contestants: Jessica Johnson, Chef and Restaurateur from Cleveland, OH (eliminated after the appetizer); Craig Walker, Chef and Restaurateur from New Orleans, LA (eliminated after the entrée); Greg Beckham, Chef and Restaurateur from Cleveland, OH (eliminated after the dessert); Christine Wendland, Executive Chef from Chesterfield, NJ (winner); Notes: The theme of this episode was backyard barbecuing. The classic burger fixings in the second round contained onions, tomatoes, and lettuce. The watermelon grill in the third round was half a hollowed out watermelon with fruit skewers on top placed to resemble grill grates.
419	8	"Flour Power"	Nancy Silverton, Scott Conant, and Amanda Freitag	July 11, 2017
Ingredients: Appetizer: piadina dough, skirt steak, bitter melon, vegetable gratin; Entrée: pâte à choux dough, chicken breast, kale, roasted mushrooms; Dessert: lemon balm, oven-roasted grapes, marshmallow spread, pastry flour; Contestants: Tracy Wilk, Executive Pastry Chef from New York, NY (eliminated after the appetizer); Sophie Jaeger, Pastry Chef and Restaurateur from Brooklyn, NY (eliminated after the entrée); Anna Fitting, Executive Pastry Chef from New York, NY (eliminated after the dessert); Crystal Smith, Pastry Chef from Detroit, MI (winner); Notes: This episode had all female pastry chefs. They were required to bake something in each round. The chefs were given 30 minutes in the appetizer round and 45 minutes in the dessert round to showcase their pastry talents.
420	9	"Alton's Challenge, Part 1"	Alton Brown, Maneet Chauhan, and Hugh Acheson	October 10, 2017
Ingredients: Appetizer: smoked salmon macarons, black garlic, micro radishes, Chilean sea bass; Entrée: hard smoked eggs, cardoons, red shishito peppers, smoked meatballs; Dessert: pig skin, Anjou pears, mozzarella, suanmeitang; Contestants: Leah Gourlie, Pastry Chef and Owner from Cleveland, OH (eliminated after the appetizer); Jamal Bland, Executive Chef from New York, NY (eliminated after the entrée); Jessica Chaney, Pastry Chef from Detroit, MI (eliminated after the dessert); Gavin Jobe, Chef and Restaurateur from Baton Rouge, LA (winner); Notes: This is part 1 of a 5-part tournament where Alton Brown picked the baskets with specific scientific, gastronomic techniques in mind. The theme of this episode was smoke and the contestants were required to infuse smoke into each dish. A basket ingredient in the entree round (the meatballs) was smoked by Alton himself.
421	10	"Alton's Challenge, Part 2"	Alton Brown, Amanda Freitag, and Marcus Samuelsson	October 17, 2017
Ingredients: Appetizer: instant mashed potatoes, tuna floss, cucumbers with blooms, bacalao; Entrée: clams, tomato crisps, olives, beef jerky; Dessert: space ice cream, Sharon fruit, dried pomegranate seeds, dehydrated scrambled eggs; Contestants: Lisa Pucci Delgado, Private Chef from Cleveland, OH (eliminated after the appetizer); Vinnie Cimino, Chef de Cuisine from Cleveland, OH (eliminated after the entrée); Ben Bebenroth, Chef and Restaurateur from Cleveland, OH (eliminated after the dessert); Nick Wallace, Executive Chef from Jackson, MS (winner); Notes: This is part 2 of a 5-part tournament where Alton Brown picked the baskets with specific scientific, gastronomic techniques in mind. The theme of this episode was dehydration, with at least one dehydrated ingredient in each round. A basket ingredient in the entree round (the beef jerky) was made by Alton from brined, dehydrated flank steak.
422	11	"Alton's Challenge, Part 3"	Alton Brown, Amanda Freitag, and Wylie Dufresne	October 24, 2017
Ingredients: Appetizer: transparent ravioli, rainbow carrots, crab legs, tapioca maltodextrin; Entrée: zucchini blossoms, arugula noodles, poached pears, lamb rib roast; Dessert: raindrop cake, blood oranges, popping sorghum, cookie dough ice cream sandwiches; Contestants: Tiffany Schleigh, Pastry Chef from New York, NY (eliminated after the appetizer); Louis Goral, Executive Chef from New York, NY (eliminated after the entrée); Andrea Anom, Line Cook from New York, NY (eliminated after the dessert); Chris Holland, Executive Chef from Sparkill, NY (winner); Notes: This is part 3 of a 5-part tournament where Alton Brown picked the baskets with specific scientific, gastronomic techniques in mind. The theme of this episode was molecular gastronomy, with at least one modernist ingredient in each round. A basket ingredient in the entree round (lamb rib roast) was set aside on a separate table. It was cooked sous-vide inside an immersion circulator.
423	12	"Alton's Challenge, Part 4"	Alton Brown, Amanda Freitag, and Alex Guarnaschelli	October 31, 2017
Ingredients: Appetizer: mutton chops, kimchi, cocoa nibs, champagne; Entrée: red snapper, sourdough bread, purple cauliflower, natto; Dessert: sauerkraut cake, pickled green strawberries, beer, passion fruit; Contestants: Jason Rodriguez, Executive Chef and Owner from New York, NY (eliminated after the appetizer); Regan Reik, Executive Chef from Cleveland, OH (eliminated after the entrée); Kashi Smith, Chef Tournant from New York, NY (eliminated after the dessert); Michael Nelson, Executive Chef from New Orleans, LA (winner); Notes: This is part 4 of a 5-part tournament where Alton Brown picked the baskets with specific scientific, gastronomic techniques in mind. The theme of this episode was fermentation, with at least one fermented/pickled ingredient in each round. A basket ingredient in the appetizer round (champagne) was initially unveiled as a champagne flute, and the chefs were treated to a small lesson from Alton on how fermentation of grapes results in alcohol.
424	13	"Alton's Challenge, Grand Finale"	Alton Brown, Alex Guarnaschelli, and George Mendes	November 7, 2017
Ingredients: Appetizer: smoked chubs, baby beets, curry ketchup, microwave fried herbs; Entrée: pork crown roast, baby artichokes, smen, dried myrtle berries; Dessert: dried tarantulas, whole coconut, marzipan fruit, cherry cola sorbet; Contestants: Michael Nelson, Executive Chef from New Orleans, LA (eliminated after the appetizer); Nick Wallace, Executive Chef from Jackson, MS (chopped 1st in dessert)* (eliminated after the entrée); Gavin Jobe, Chef and Restaurateur from Baton Rouge, LA (chopped 2nd in dessert)* (eliminated after the dessert); Chris Holland, Executive Chef from Sparkill, NY (winner); Notes: This is the final part of a 5-part tournament where Alton Brown picked the baskets. There was no specific theme for the finale. A basket ingredient in the dessert round (sorbet) was shown as created by Alton via a dry ice fire extinguisher and sorbet mixture combined in a food processor. This was the first episode to feature a non-elimination (in round 2) and the first episode to feature a double elimination (in round 3). *For the first time in Chopped history, three competitors moved into the dessert round.

=== Season 35 (2017–18) ===
No. overall	No. in season	Title	Judges	Original release date
425	1	"Clam Clash"	Scott Conant, Amanda Freitag, and Jordan Andino	July 18, 2017
Ingredients: Appetizer: little neck clams, ultra mizuna, vadouvan, banana chips; Entrée: red grouper, candy-coated licorice, squid ink, petite purple broccoli; Dessert: navy bean pie, guava, cherry spoon fruit, sgroppino al limone; Contestants: Kristina Mellegard, Private Chef from New York, NY (eliminated after the appetizer); William Gauger, Chef and Co-Owner from Long Island City, NY (eliminated after the entrée); Kimani Hines, Executive Chef from New Rochelle, NY (eliminated after the dessert); Julie Cole, Executive Chef from Brooklyn, NY (winner); Notes: Guest judge Jordan Andino was a contestant from the Chopped season 15 episode, Heads Up!
426	2	"Clock Shock"	Scott Conant, Amanda Freitag, and Maneet Chauhan	July 25, 2017
Ingredients: Appetizer: tiger prawns, pea tendrils, corzetti pasta, duck salami; Entrée: pork strip steaks, morel mushrooms, artichoke paste, crunchy pizza snacks; Dessert: music paper bread, gala apples, bitters, mini cherry lollipops; Contestants: Omar Mitchell, Chef and Owner from Detroit, MI (eliminated after the appetizer); Jen Scher, Executive Chef from New York, NY (eliminated after the entrée); Giorgio Giacinto, Chef and Owner from New Rochelle, NY (eliminated after the dessert); Marcus Woodham, Chef de Cuisine from New Orleans, LA (winner)
427	3	"Food Truck Luck"	Scott Conant, Amanda Freitag, and Marcus Samuelsson	September 5, 2017
Ingredients: Appetizer: goat barbacoa tacos, Asian long beans, spring roll wrappers, chicken souvlaki; Entrée: lobster rolls, bok choy, ramen noodles, chile de arbol; Dessert: tropical fruit pops, candied nuts, chocolate covered bananas, dessert nachos; Contestants: Suzette Montalvo, Food Truck Owner ('A New Yorican Thing') from Long Island, NY (eliminated after the appetizer); Andrew Zurica, Food Truck Owner ('Hard Times Sundaes') from New York, NY (eliminated after the entrée); Hassan Musselmani, Food Truck Owner ('The Drunken Rooster') from Detroit, MI (eliminated after the dessert); Caitlyn Napolitano, Food Truck Co-owner ('Los Viajeros') from New York, NY (winner); Notes: The contestants were all food truck owners. Chef Hassan previously competed on season 15 of Gordon Ramsay's Hell's Kitchen in 2016, finishing in 11th place.
428	4	"Waffles for the Win"	Maneet Chauhan, Amanda Freitag, and Joseph “JJ” Johnson	September 12, 2017
Ingredients: Appetizer: waffle batter, chicken tenders, chiles de arbol, potato chips; Entrée: liege waffle dough, sliced beef shanks in soy sauce, kumquats, mustard greens; Dessert: waffle cookies, buttermilk, creamy organic peanut butter, dried strawberries; Contestants: Bryan Lindsay, Executive Chef from Brooklyn, NY (eliminated after the appetizer); Brandi Marter, Chef and Restaurateur from Memphis, TN (eliminated after the entrée); Juan Carlos Gonzalez, Executive Chef from New Orleans, LA (eliminated after the dessert); Adam Bostwick, Chef and Restaurateur from Cleveland, OH (winner); Notes: Contestants were tasked to cook dishes paired with waffles in every round. While Chopped normally obscures brand names, the potato chips in round 1 were shown to be Lay's Classic potato chips via on screen graphic.
429	5	"Comfort Zone"	Marc Murphy, Amanda Freitag, and Geoffrey Zakarian	September 19, 2017
Ingredients: Appetizer: fried chicken, rainbow chard, fingerling potatoes, bacon grease; Entrée: meatloaf mix, heirloom tomatoes, chanterelle mushrooms, boxed mac & cheese; Dessert: peanut butter & jelly sandwiches, strawberries, vanilla wafers, chocolate milk; Contestants: Jayda Atkinson, Catering Chef from New Orleans, LA (eliminated after the appetizer); Darwell Yeager III, Executive Chef and Owner from Pearl, MS (eliminated after the entrée); Jess Dunne, Chef and Owner from Southold, NY (eliminated after the dessert); John Powali, Chef from New York, NY (winner); Notes: The theme of this episode was comfort food in every basket.
430	6	"The Beets Go On"	Marcus Samuelsson, Maneet Chauhan, and Amanda Freitag	September 26, 2017
Ingredients: Appetizer: sosis bandari, mostarda, crescent roll dough, corn of the cob; Entrée: lobster, mâche, rose petals, Mexican chorizo; Dessert: crème brûlée, blackberries, rainbow beets, Italian almond wafers; Contestants: Melissa Araujo, Caterer from New Orleans, LA (eliminated after the appetizer); George Georgiades, Chef and Owner from New York, NY (eliminated after the entrée); Chase Sanders, Executive Chef from New York, NY (eliminated after the dessert); Eric Arboleda, Chef from Colombia (winner)
431	7	"Spooked"	Geoffrey Zakarian, Maneet Chauhan, and Amanda Freitag	October 3, 2017
Ingredients: Appetizer: scary skull platter, barmbrack, Halloween party punch, asparagus; Entrée: spooky egg eyeballs, blood shots, gory brain, avocados; Dessert: Halloween candy cake, vampire's kiss martini, freaky brie, mixed berries; Contestants: Michael Monzon, Teppanyaki Chef from Los Angeles, CA (eliminated after the appetizer); Dani Macchia, Private Chef from New York, NY (eliminated after the entrée); Kimberly "Kim" Gibson, Chef & Restaurateur from Chagrin Falls, OH (eliminated after the dessert); Dustine Gonsalves, Chef de Cuisine from Los Angeles, CA (winner); Notes: This was a Halloween themed episode. In the appetizer round the "skull platter" was prosciutto arranged on a prop skull to look like skin. In the entree round, the "egg eyeballs" were poached eggs in a pan, the blood shots were decorative syringes filled with a red syrup, and the "gory brain" was a glazed turkey meatloaf loaf shaped like a brain. In the dessert round the "Halloween candy cake" was a chocolate cake decorated with various Halloween candies. The "freaky brie" was a brie cheese wheel wrapped in puff pastry strips to look like a mummy face.
432	8	"Feel the Burn"	Scott Conant, Amanda Freitag, and Maneet Chauhan	October 19, 2017
Ingredients: Appetizer: spicy chicken feet, Persian cucumbers, mandarins, buffalo cauliflower dip; Entrée: five-alarm chili, cinnamon rolls, lamb shoulder, horseradish root; Dessert: sriracha lollipops, jalapeño-blueberry cornbread, baby pineapples, white chocolate; Contestants: Iliana Negron, Executive Chef from Nyack, NY (eliminated after the appetizer); Alex Diaz, Executive Chef from New York, NY (eliminated after the entrée); Ken Hatfield, Chef & Restaurateur from Cleveland, OH (eliminated after the dessert); Airis Johnson, Private Chef from Brooklyn, NY (winner); Notes: The theme of this episode was spicy foods in each basket. Chef Ken Hatfield is a descendant of the Hatfield family of the famous Hatfield–McCoy feud.
433	9	"Gimme Gator"	Scott Conant, Alex Guarnaschelli, and Tiffani Faison	October 26, 2017
Ingredients: Appetizer: king crab legs, fresh cut whole kernel corn, black garlic, coconut vinegar; Entrée: alligator, carrot jam, green almonds, calvados; Dessert: Persian chickpea cookies, strawberry gelatin, bananas, cherimoya; Contestants: Rudy Straker, Private Chef from Queens, NY (eliminated after the appetizer); Ben Bruckenthal, Sous Chef from Brooklyn, NY (eliminated after the entrée); Tiffany Senin, Chef and Owner from Brooklyn, NY (eliminated after the dessert); Jacob Bensley, Sous Chef from New York (winner)
434	10	"Flavor Savor"	Chris Santos, Einat Admony, and Michael Psilakis	November 2, 2017
Ingredients: Appetizer: rice-stuffed grape leaves, baby octopus, cured olives, bresaola; Entrée: dorade, stinging nettles, watermelon radish, village salad; Dessert: rosewater syrup, figs, pistachio cream, angel food cake; Contestants: Cosmo Bisticas, Executive Chef from Brooklyn, NY (eliminated after the appetizer); George Kringas, Chef and Owner from White Plains, NY (eliminated after the entrée); Tara Cianella, Chef and Owner from Nyack, NY (eliminated after the dessert); Gabriel Israel, Chef de Cuisine from New York, NY (winner); Notes: The baskets in this episode featured Mediterranean ingredients. Both guest judges, Einat Admony and Michael Psilakis, were past Chopped winners.
435	11	"Pie Jinks"	Geoffrey Zakarian, Amanda Freitag, and Scott Conant	November 9, 2017
Ingredients: Appetizer: Honeycrisp apples, sour gummies, pumpkin pie, Merguez sausage; Entrée: Whipped topping, baby kale blend, pancetta, shepherd’s pie; Dessert: Key lime pie, rhubarb, candied ginger, spiced rum; Contestants: James Graham, Executive Chef from Staten Island, NY (eliminated after the appetizer); Zack Stapelman, Executive Chef from Brooklyn, NY (eliminated after the entrée); Natalie Colledge, Owner & Culinary Director from Montclair, NJ (eliminated after the dessert); Kenneth Temple, Private Chef from New Orleans, LA (winner); Notes: The theme of this episode was pies. The chefs were required to make a pie in every round and there was a different pie in every basket. The chefs were given 30 minutes in the appetizer round and 45 minutes in both the entree and dessert round in order to properly cook their pies.
436	12	"An Iron Chef Thanksgiving"	Alex Guarnaschelli, Jose Garces, and Marc Forgione	November 14, 2017
Ingredients: Appetizer: turkey confit, Brussels sprouts, Thanksgiving cider cocktail, turkey offal; Entrée: cornish hens, haricots verts, Thanksgiving gravy flavored candy, cranberry pomegranate terrine; Dessert: sweet potato casserole, pears, port wine cheese, Thanksgiving waffle sandwich; Contestants: Roxanne Spruance, Executive Chef and Owner from New York, NY (charity: American Farmland Trust) (eliminated after the appetizer); Giorgio Rapicavoli, Executive Chef, from Miami, FL (charity: Our Pride Academy) (eliminated after the entrée); Hugh Mangum, Executive Chef and Owner from New York, NY (charity: Share Our Strength) (eliminated after the dessert); Emily Chapman, Sous Chef from New York, NY (charity: Shepherd's Circle Foundation) (winner); Notes: This was a Thanksgiving themed episode. All four contestants were Chopped Champions returning to win money for their charity of choice. Judging them were three Iron Chefs from Iron Chef America (with Alex also being a regular Chopped judge). By winning this episode, Chef Emily Chapman became the first four-time Chopped champion.
437	13	"Espresso Express"	Scott Conant, Maneet Chauhan, and Amanda Freitag	November 21, 2017
Ingredients: Appetizer: cobia, fennel, honeydew melon, ground espresso; Entrée: veal sweetbreads, napini, pierogies, black mint paste; Dessert: sesame seed candy, mangoes, blackstrap molasses, raspberry snack cakes; Contestants: Cybille St. Aude, Sous Chef from Long Island, NY (eliminated after the appetizer); Brandon Williams, Chef de Cuisine from Cleveland, OH (eliminated after the entrée); Lawrence Ofori, Executive Chef from New York, NY (eliminated after the dessert); Michael Castellon, Sous Chef from New York, NY (winner)
438	14	"Weird Twist"	Scott Conant, Amanda Freitag, and Geoffrey Zakarian	November 28, 2017
Ingredients: Appetizer: babbouche, conehead cabbage, pig's head terrine, black rice ramen; Entrée: stuffed lamb intestines, cured tuna heart, garlic ice cream, red runner bean blooms; Dessert: queen weaver ants, tang yuan, sweet avocado (cream), szechuan buttons; Contestants: Jay Reifel, Executive Chef from New York, NY (eliminated after the appetizer); Tom Coughlan, Executive Chef from Brooklyn, NY (eliminated after the entrée); Ana Gonzales, Executive Chef from Memphis, TN (eliminated after the dessert); Nick Testa, Executive Chef from New York, NY (winner); Notes: The theme of this episode was "weird food" in every basket. The babbouche in the appetizer round is a Moroccan snail dish.
439	15	"Chopped Grand Holiday"	Marc Murphy, Maneet Chauhan, and Amanda Freitag	December 5, 2017
Ingredients: Appetizer: goose breast, peppermint bark vodka, Christmas tree veggie plate, Hanukkah gelt cookie cake; Entrée: deckle of beef, kugel, porcini mushrooms (in olive oil), hard boiled egg snowmen; Dessert: chestnut tree honey, festive pretzels, Santa Claus melon, springerle cookies; Contestants: Diana Sabater, Chef from Philadelphia, PA (charity: Esperanza) (eliminated after the appetizer); Darius Peacock, Executive Chef from Trenton, NJ (charity: Good Shepherd Services) (eliminated after the entrée); Sophina Uong, Executive Chef from Oakland, CA (charity: Camp Okizu) (eliminated after the dessert); Adam Greenberg, Executive Chef from Norwalk, CT (charity: Mowat-Wilson Syndrome) (winner); Notes: This was a holiday themed episode. All four contestants were Chopped Grand Champions returning to win money for their charity of choice. The chefs were given 30 minutes in the appetizer round instead of the usual 20 to allow time to properly butcher and cook the goose breast. The veggie plate in the appetizer round mainly consisted of broccoli, cauliflower, and cherry tomatoes, arranged to look like a Christmas tree. The festive pretzels in the dessert round were pretzel sticks dipped in green candy coating and sprinkled with silver nonpareils. By winning this episode, Chef Adam Greenberg became the first male four-time Chopped champion (and the second overall chef to achieve it; with the first chef having achieved it only two episodes earlier in the Thanksgiving episode).
440	16	"True Grits"	Scott Conant, Amanda Freitag, and Marc Murphy	December 7, 2017
Ingredients: Appetizer: collard greens, pickled watermelon rind, head-on shrimp, hominy grits; Entrée: polenta, spiral ham, green beans, pimento cheese; Dessert: blue grits, blackberries, lemon oil, boiled peanuts; Contestants: B.J. Chester-Tamayo, Chef & Owner from Memphis, TN (eliminated after the appetizer); Jean Gabriel, Chef & Co-Owner from Stamford, CT (eliminated after the entrée); Tres Barnard, Chef from New Orleans, LA (eliminated after the dessert); Steve Costanzo, Chef & Owner from Stamford, CT (winner); Notes: Each basket in this episode contained some form of grits. Chef B.J. cut herself in the last seconds of the appetizer round, leaving enough blood on her station and plates to deem her dish unsafe to eat. The judges allowed her to bring over her non-contaminated components from her station for them to taste after the other chefs granted her permission to do so.
441	17	"Cocktail Party"	Scott Conant, Amanda Freitag, and Lauren Gerrie	December 19, 2017
Ingredients: Appetizer: tuna, crab meat cocktail, finger limes, vodka; Entrée: filet mignon, cocktail onions, summer truffles, single malt scotch whiskey; Dessert: marshmallow spread, fruit cocktail, gold leaf, gin; Contestants: Josh Moore, Executive Chef from New York, NY (eliminated after the appetizer); Catt Rolland, Pastry Chef & Sous Chef from New Orleans, LA (eliminated after the entrée); Charles Disa, Chef & Caterer from New York, NY (eliminated after the dessert); Dave Martin, Chef Consultant from New York, NY (winner); Notes: The theme of the episode was cocktail food, with each contestant having to make small dishes suited for a cocktail party. They also had to prepare an alcoholic drink to pair with each dish. The rounds were extended by an extra 10 minutes to account for cocktail preparation (30 minutes in the first round and 40 minutes in the second and third rounds). The guest judge, Lauren Gerrie, was a previous Chopped winner from season 6 ('A Cornish Mess') and part 3 in the 2011 Chopped Champions tournament.
442	18	"Amped for Ramps"	Marc Murphy, Tiffani Faison, and Dale Talde	December 26, 2017
Ingredients: Appetizer: calamari, ramps, cherry peppers, liverwurst; Entrée: beef kidneys, purple butterfly sorrel, pignoli cookies, ginger beer; Dessert: lemongrass, papaya, goat's milk, popcorn jelly beans; Contestants: Rochelle Honeygan, Sous Chef from Brooklyn, NY (eliminated after the appetizer); Dallas Martinez, Executive Chef from Cleveland, OH (eliminated after the entrée); John Brennan, Chef and Owner from New Haven, CT (eliminated after the dessert); Tristen Epps, Executive Chef from Brooklyn, NY (winner)
443	19	"Mardi Gras Goals"	Marc Murphy, Maneet Chauhan, and David Guas	February 6, 2018
Ingredients: Appetizer: shrimp po'boys, tasso ham, kohlrabi, milk punch; Entrée: crawfish, Cajun caramel corn, okra, dark roux; Dessert: king cake, cherries, café brûlot, praline; Contestants: Byron Bradley, Chef de Cuisine from New Orleans, LA (eliminated after the appetizer); Brandon Green, Executive Chef from New Orleans, LA (eliminated after the entrée); Austin Kirzner, Executive Chef from New Orleans, LA (eliminated after the dessert); Syrena Johnson, Private Chef & Caterer from New Orleans, LA (winner); Notes: All the contestants were from New Orleans and the theme of the baskets centered around Mardi Gras.
444	20	"Dim Sum Yum"	Scott Conant, Chris Santos, and Marc Murphy	March 6, 2018
Ingredients: Appetizer: hot & sour soup, Tokyo scallions, bubble gum flavored candy, ground pork; Entrée: Korean-style short ribs, galangal, sorghum wine, dim sum; Dessert: puffed rice cereal treats, mangosteen, cherry blossom paste, hard-boiled quail eggs; Contestants: Adam Sherris, Sushi Chef from Denver, CO (eliminated after the appetizer); Caitlin Salisbury, Chef from Kingston, NY (eliminated after the entrée); Lina Lynn, Chef and Owner from Jackson, MS (eliminated after the dessert); Chris Paulikas, Executive Sous Chef from Philadelphia, PA (winner)

=== Season 36 (2017–18) ===
No. overall	No. in season	Title	Judges	Original release date
445	1	"Better Duck Next Time"	Scott Conant, Amanda Freitag, and Jonathon Sawyer	December 12, 2017
Ingredients: Appetizer: tiered cheese tower, cavatelli, frozen lima beans, duck tongues; Entrée: frankfurter crown roast, small graffiti eggplant, karela juice, goat leg; Dessert: moose ears, Saturn peaches, hard cider, Jordan almonds; Contestants: Jonathan Scinto, Private Chef from Long Island, NY (eliminated after the appetizer); Amanda Henson, Chef and Owner from Las Vegas, NV (eliminated after the entrée); Andrew Welenken, Executive Chef from Louisville, KY (eliminated after the dessert); Jamaal Taherzadeh, Executive Chef from Las Vegas, NV (winner); Notes: The tiered cheese tower in the appetizer round contained Tete de Moine, Tomme de Savoie, cupola and a Spanish cheese. The 'frankfurter crown roast' in the entrée round was a bunch of hotdogs bundled together in a standing ring to resemble a "crown roast" of meat. The 'moose ears' in the dessert round were pieces of fried, sugary dough drizzled with caramel sauce. Guest judge Jonathan Sawyer was previously a contestant on Chopped: Grill Masters Napa.
446	2	"Gold Medal Games: Frying"	Geoffrey Zakarian, Alex Guarnaschelli, and Scott Conant	January 2, 2018
Ingredients: Appetizer: Alligator, lotus root, deep-fried cherry punch, pesto sauce; Entrée: Skate wings, dill pickles, funnel cakes, haggis in a can; Dessert: Deep-fried bacon-wrapped chocolate bars, strawberries, matcha powder, purple sweet potato ravioli; Contestants: Abel Gonzales, Chef and Partner from Dallas, TX (eliminated after the appetizer); Anthony Serrano, Executive Chef and Owner from Chandler, AZ (eliminated after the entrée); Allen Nguyen, Chef and Partner from New Orleans, LA (eliminated after the dessert); Sarah Wade, Executive Chef from Boston, MA (winner); Notes: Part 1 of a 5-part tournament with a prize of $50,000 in the finale. In this episode, all four chefs were known for their expertise in frying and were required to fry something in every round. Unlike past frying episodes, there was an extra deep fryer in the kitchen instead of providing each chef a preheated pot of oil.
447	3	"Gold Medal Games: Grilling"	Chris Santos, Amanda Freitag, and Marc Murphy	January 9, 2018
Ingredients: Appetizer: White BBQ sauce, pie crust, mangoes, bone-in strip steaks; Entrée: Spatchcocked chickens, cucumber kimchi, red cabbage, cheese puffs; Dessert: Mini marshmallows, grilled lemon lemonade, zucchini, pig pickin’ cake; Contestants: Maria Mazon, Executive Chef and Owner from Tucson, AZ (eliminated after the appetizer); Jay Ducote, Chef and Restaurateur from Baton Rouge, LA (eliminated after the entrée); Eric Thomas, Chef and Pitmaster from Atlanta, GA (eliminated after the dessert); Lynnae Oxley-Loupe, Chef and Pitmaster from Portland, OR (winner); Notes: Part 2 of a 5-part tournament. In this episode, all four contestants were known for their skill on the grill and were required to grill something in every round. The stove tops were outfitted with grill sheets, but the chefs were permitted to use the ovens.
448	4	"Gold Medal Games: Fast!"	Geoffrey Zakarian, Alex Guarnaschelli, and Marc Murphy	January 16, 2018
Ingredients: Appetizer: Torch lollipops, edamame, neonata, raw oysters; Entrée: Dover sole, grilled corn on the cob, poblanos, sandia loca; Dessert: Whole coconut, duck fat upside-down cake, cheddar cheese ice cream, nopales; Contestants: Manny Slomovitz, Executive Chef from Cincinnati, OH (eliminated after the appetizer); Joe Passanante, Chef de Cuisine from Queens, NY (eliminated after the entrée); Griffin Paulin, Chef and Owner from Louisville, KY (eliminated after the dessert); Ken Harvey, Executive Chef from Tucson, AZ (winner); Notes: Part 3 of a 5-part tournament. In this episode, all four competitors were known for their speed in the kitchen. Keeping in line with this theme, each round was 5 minutes shorter than normal (the appetizer round was 15 minutes, while the entrée and dessert rounds were 25 minutes each).
449	5	"Gold Medal Games: Baking"	Scott Conant, Marc Murphy, and Geoffrey Zakarian	January 23, 2018
Ingredients: Appetizer: Lamb noisette roast, ginger liqueur, forelle pears, cinnamon roll dough; Entrée: Smoked turkey legs, roasted head of cauliflower, spaghetti rings, shredded phyllo dough; Dessert: Banana curd, caneles, freeze-dried blueberries, hot chocolate; Contestants: Jeremy Fogg, Pastry Chef from New Orleans, LA (eliminated after the appetizer); Keris Kuwana, Executive Pastry Chef from Las Vegas, NV (eliminated after the entrée); Michael Gillet, Executive Pastry Chef from Las Vegas, NV (eliminated after the dessert); Winnette McIntosh Ambrose, Pastry Chef and Owner from Washington, D.C (winner); Notes: Part 4 of a 5-part tournament. In this episode, all four contestants were pastry chefs who specialized in desserts and baking. They were required to bake something in every round. The roasted head of cauliflower was topped with pomegranate seeds and mint. In the dessert round, Chef Michael failed to bake anything in his dish which led to his elimination.
450	6	"Gold Medal Games: Grand Finale"	Chris Santos, Alex Guarnaschelli, and Scott Conant	January 30, 2018
Ingredients: Appetizer: Rattlesnake, pomelo, golden snack cakes, grilled avocado; Entrée: Lamb ribs, red currants, hard-boiled quail eggs, far far; Dessert: Confetti frosting, soft shell almonds, deep-fried champagne, rambutan; Contestants: Ken Harvey, Executive Chef from Tucson, AZ (eliminated after the appetizer); Winnette McIntosh Ambrose, Pastry Chef and Owner from Washington, D.C (eliminated after the entrée); Lynnae Oxley-Loupe, Chef and Pitmaster from Portland, OR (eliminated after the dessert); Sarah Wade, Executive Chef from Boston, MA (winner); Notes: Final part of the gold medal tournament. The winner gets $50,000. Unlike the previous episodes, there was no set theme for the finale (though different ingredients seemed to represent the past four themes; something grilled, something fried, something baked etc.)
451	7	"Chocolate, Chocolate, Chocolate!"	Scott Conant, Alex Guarnaschelli, and Zac Young	February 13, 2018
Ingredients: Appetizer: (candy round) dark chocolate superworms, chocolate pudding mix, animal crackers, candy cane beets; Entrée: (cake round) cookie and caramel chocolate bars, chocolate hummus, habanero peppers, lamb tallow; Dessert: (ice cream round) white chocolate chunks, love potion cocktail, taleggio cheese, Spanish chorizo; Contestants: Josip Franc, Executive Pastry Chef from Bernardsville, NJ (eliminated after the appetizer); Philippe Fallait, Chef and Owner from Astoria, NY (eliminated after the entrée); Marissa Delgado, Executive Pastry Chef from Phoenix, AZ (eliminated after the dessert); Melanie Moss, Pastry Chef and Owner from Brooklyn, NY (winner); Notes: The theme of the episode was chocolate. The contestants had to make chocolate desserts in every round; specifically candy in the first round, cake in the second, and ice cream in the third. The first round was extended to 30 minutes, the second round was extended to 60 minutes, and the third round was the usual 30 minutes (with an extra ice cream machine brought in). The love potion cocktail in the third round was composed of white chocolate liqueur, vodka, pomegranate juice, and strawberries.
452	8	"The Light Stuff"	Scott Conant, Alex Guarnaschelli, and Jason Kieffer	February 20, 2018
Ingredients: Appetizer: wild salmon fillets, cottage cheese, zucchini noodles, vegan bacon; Entrée: pork chops, cauliflower rice, protein-packed snack box, lemon cayenne drink; Dessert: citrus salad, acai berry powder, 'dumbbell' cookies, rice cakes; Contestants: Joshua Wiggins, Sous Chef from Red Bank, NJ (eliminated after the appetizer); Isaac Rios, Chef and Cafe Manager from Chandler, AZ (eliminated after the entrée); Mattia Meneghetti, Chef from New York, NY (eliminated after the dessert); Celeste Rogers, Chef and Instructor from New York, NY (winner); Notes: The theme of this episode was "healthy eats" with healthy, light ingredients in every basket. The snack box in the entree round consisted of two eggs, cheese, apple slices, grapes, peanut butter, and bread.
453	9	"Epic Eats"	Chris Santos, Amanda Freitag, and Marcus Samuelsson	February 27, 2018
Ingredients: Appetizer: mac & cheese mega burger, buffalo chicken soda, Brussels sprouts, everything bagel seasoning; Entrée: gravy mashed potato cake, tomahawk steak, red noodle beans, cold brew ice pops; Dessert: cookie bowl ice cream sundae, gummy worm, finger grapes, huitlacoche; Contestants: C.J. Hamm, Executive Chef from Tucson, AZ (eliminated after the appetizer); Joseph Yoon, Private Chef from Brooklyn, NY (eliminated after the entrée); Jennifer Russo, Chef and Owner from Phoenix, AZ (eliminated after the dessert); Jillian Moskites, Food Truck Chef from Middletown, CT (winner); Notes: The theme of the episode was at least one "epic", indulgent ingredient in every basket.
454	10	"Pork on the Brain"	Adam Sobel, Amanda Freitag, and Chris Santos	March 20, 2018
Ingredients: Appetizer: pig face roulade, Berkshire pork chops, pork chop cocktail, fish peppers; Entrée: canned pork brains, Iberico collar, salsify, huckleberries; Dessert: sanguinaccio dolce, mangalitsa lardo, peppermint pig, tiger figs; Contestants: Donald Hawk, Sous Chef, The Gladly, Phoenix, AZ (eliminated after the appetizer); Laura Licona, Culinary Director, Emma's Torch, Brooklyn, NY (eliminated after the entrée); Ryan Andre, Executive Chef, City Pork Brassierie & Bar, Baton Rouge, LA (eliminated after the dessert); Christian Hayes, Chef and Owner, Dandelion Catering, Yarmouth, ME (winner); Notes: The theme of this episode was pork in every basket. The pork chops in the first basket were given to the chefs as a whole rib roast.
455	11	"Fat Chance"	Scott Conant, Amanda Freitag, and Chris Santos	March 27, 2018
Ingredients: Appetizer: duck confit, baby turnips, basket of biscuits, narutomaki; Entrée: watermelon curry, acorn squash, kalekale, caul fat; Dessert: lingonberry syrup, papaya, Greek yogurt, vanilla sandwich cookies; Contestants: Marco Barrila, Chef and Owner from Southampton, NY (eliminated after the appetizer); Tami Treadwell, Chef and Owner from Harlem, NY (eliminated after the entrée); Christopher Harris, Executive Chef and Owner from Portland, ME (eliminated after the dessert); Jennifer Caraway, Chef and Founder from Phoenix, AZ (winner)
456	12	"You've Been Canned"	Chris Santos, Maneet Chauhan, and Marc Murphy	April 10, 2018
Ingredients: Appetizer: baby octopus, calamondin limes, crumpets, cream cheese; Entrée: tilefish, canned steamed beef, Asian long beans, fideo pasta; Dessert: Persian love cake, lychee, strawberry milk powder, gorgonzola dolce; Contestants: Sunshine Flagg, Chef & Owner from Louisville, KY (eliminated after the appetizer); Dave Sclarow, Chef & Co-Owner from Brooklyn, NY (eliminated after the entrée); Christopher Zabita, Executive Chef from New York, NY (eliminated after the dessert); Hannah Wong, Sous Chef from New York, NY (winner)
457	13	"Million-Dollar Meals"	Martha Stewart, Geoffrey Zakarian, and Chris Santos	June 5, 2018
Ingredients: Appetizer: toro tartare with caviar, high-roller bagel, Ibérico ham, petite snow peas; Entrée: Wagyu double cheeseburger with gold chocolate bacon, 20 year old bourbon, arugula blossoms, white Alba truffle; Dessert: geode cake, etrog citron, fruit pops in champagne, camel milk chocolate bars; Contestants: Jonathan Scallion, Private Chef, Las Vegas, NV (eliminated after the appetizer); Madeleine Dee, Executive Chef & Owner from Louisville, KY (eliminated after the entrée); Chris Brugman, Executive Sous Chef from Scottsdale, AZ (eliminated after the dessert); Johnny Church, Executive Chef from Las Vegas, NV (winner); Notes: Each basket in this episode had high-end, expensive ingredients. This was the first episode that touted Martha Stewart as a new Chopped judge (though she has guest judged on Chopped Junior in the past). The high-roller bagel was topped with cream cheese, Riesling gelee, and gold leaf. The Wagyu bacon cheeseburger was topped with lettuce and goose pate. The camel milk chocolate was provided by Martha Stewart from her trip to Dubai. Chef Jonathan previously competed on Season 11 of Gordon Ramsay's Hell's Kitchen in 2013, finishing in 3rd place.

=== Season 37 (2018–19) ===
No. overall	No. in season	Title	Judges	Original release date
458	1	"Luck of the Irish"	Stuart O'Keeffe, Amanda Freitag, and Scott Conant	March 13, 2018
Ingredients: Appetizer: black radishes, dry stout, mushy peas, blood pudding; Entrée: crubeens, cabbage, farmhouse Irish cheddar, Irish champ; Dessert: granny smith apples, 99, Irish whiskey, plum pudding; Contestants: Andrei Enikeev, Executive Chef from Boston, MA (eliminated after the appetizer); Alex Galvis, Sous Chef from Boston, MA (eliminated after the entrée); Scott Hynes, Executive Chef from New York, NY (eliminated after the dessert); Kathleen O'Brien-Price, Private Chef from New York, NY (winner); Notes: Each basket in this episode had at least one food from Ireland.
459	2	"Wild Game Plan"	Angie Mar, Marc Murphy, and Marcus Samuelsson	April 3, 2018
Ingredients: Appetizer: rack of wild boar, alligator jerky, burgundy truffle, bison grass vodka; Entrée: antelope strip loin, elk heart, bear claws, dandelion greens; Dessert: venison sausage, moose milk cocktail, honeycomb, black forest cake; Contestants: John Chambers, Company Chef from Phoenix, AZ (eliminated after the appetizer); Tandy Peterson, Chef de Cuisine from Scottsdale, AZ (eliminated after the entrée); James Richards, Chef de Cuisine from Las Vegas, NV (eliminated after the dessert); Noam Bilitzer, Sous Chef from Louisville, KY (winner); Notes: Every basket in this episode featured wild game in some form. Guest judge Angie Mar was the winner of the second Chopped: Grill Masters Tournament.
460	3	"A Frog Leg Up"	Scott Conant, Amanda Freitag, and Geoffrey Zakarian	April 17, 2018
Ingredients: Appetizer: sushi doughnuts, purple spinach, littleneck clams, toasted corn nuts; Entrée: frog legs, green peppers, shirataki noodles, cricket bolognese; Dessert: Chinese steamed buns, grapefruit, coffee jelly, rosemary; Contestants: Paco Cortes, Executive Chef from Las Vegas, NV (eliminated after the appetizer); Frank Bilotti, Sous Chef from Staten Island, NY (eliminated after the entrée); Austin Miller, Chef & Owner from Portland, ME (eliminated after the dessert); Aerin Zavory, Corporate Chef from Hamden, CT (winner); Notes: Chef Frank previously competed on season 13 of Gordon Ramsay's Hell's Kitchen in 2014, finishing in 10th place.
461	4	"Sensational Sandwiches"	Jeff Mauro, Alex Guarnaschelli, and Geoffrey Zakarian	April 24, 2018
Ingredients: Appetizer: roast beef sandwich, rainbow fingerling potatoes, fresh wasabi, chile con queso; Entrée: turducken, broccoli rabe, pickleback shots, deep-fried mayo; Dessert: ham & cheese lunch kit, soursop, salt & vinegar potato chips, ice cream sandwich cake; Contestants: Danielle Leoni, Chef & Owner from Phoenix, AZ (eliminated after the appetizer); Adam Burress, Chef & Co-Owner from Louisville, KY (eliminated after the entrée); Justin Beckett, Chef & Owner from Phoenix, AZ (eliminated after the dessert); Matt Storch, Chef & Owner from Norwalk, CT, (winner); Notes: The chefs were required to make sandwiches in every round.
462	5	"Leftover Takeover"	Scott Conant, Alex Guarnaschelli, and Marcus Samuelsson	May 1, 2018
Ingredients: Appetizer: chicken Parmesan, kale salad, brown avocado, leftover lo mein; Entrée: leftover steak, veggie platter, flat cola, half of a bánh mì; Dessert: leftover ice cream, concord grapes, cold coffee, lemon chess pie; Contestants: Michael Compean, Executive Chef from Scottsdale, AZ (eliminated after the appetizer); Ashley Goddard, Sous Chef from Phoenix, AZ (eliminated after the entrée); Rich Hinojosa, Executive Chef & Co-Owner from Phoenix, AZ (eliminated after the dessert); Evan Hennessey, Executive Chef & Owner from Dover, NH (winner); Notes: The theme of this episode was leftovers in every basket. The leftover steak was bone-in strip steak cooked rare. The veggie platter contained celery sticks, cherry tomatoes, and romanesco cauliflower.
463	6	"Hush Puppy Love"	Scott Conant, Maneet Chauhan, and Marcus Samuelsson	May 8, 2018
Ingredients: Appetizer: catfish, black-eyed peas, jalapeño hush puppy batter, bananas; Entrée: fried chicken, purple sweet potatoes, green tomatoes, peach cobbler; Dessert: creamed corn, blackberries, biscuit dough, butter pecan ice cream; Contestants: Kelli Thompson, Executive Chef from Portland, ME (eliminated after the appetizer); Greg Nalley, Chef & Owner from Baltimore, MD (eliminated after the entrée); Julian Elfedayni-Connell, Sous Chef from Mystic, CT (eliminated after the dessert); Rachel LeGloahec, Executive Chef from Las Vegas, NV (winner); Notes: The theme of this episode was U.S. southern ingredients in every basket. The fried chicken in the second round was Kentucky Fried Chicken, still in its bucket (presumably marking it as a sponsor of the show because name brand ingredients are usually obscured).
464	7	"Surf and Turf"	Scott Conant, Amanda Freitag, and Geoffrey Zakarian	May 29, 2018
Ingredients: Appetizer: gooseneck barnacles, Korean-style short ribs, ramen beer, mache; Entrée: whole lobsters, chateaubriand, frozen creamed spinach, almond chocolate bars; Dessert: candied crabs, brownie t-bones, bananas foster, passion fruit; Contestants: Alexis Trolf, Chef & Owner from Long Beach, NY (eliminated after the appetizer); Sasha Grumman, Chef de Cuisine from Los Angeles, CA (eliminated after the entrée); Jason Daly, Executive Chef from Vinalhaven, ME (eliminated after the dessert); Franco Robazetti, Executive Chef from Jersey City, NJ (winner); Notes: The theme of the episode was some form of seafood and meat ("surf and turf") in every basket.
465	8	"Under the Cuban Sun"	Maneet Chauhan, Chris Santos, and David Guas	September 11, 2018
Ingredients: Appetizer: red snapper, Cuban coffee, bok choy, yuca; Entrée: pork shoulder, buñuelos, pineapple, sofrito; Dessert: guava and cheese skewers, Cuba libre cocktail, plantains, black bean brownies; Contestants: Louie Estrada, Chef and Owner from Brooklyn, NY (eliminated after the appetizer); Ricardo Barreras, Chef and Owner from Brooklyn, NY (eliminated after the entrée); Claudia Muñiz, Sous Chef from Brooklyn, NY (eliminated after the dessert); Tatiana Rosana, Executive Chef from Boston, MA (winner); Notes: The theme of the episode was Cuban ingredients in every basket with Cuban-born chefs participating.
466	9	"Tacos and Tequila"	Marc Murphy, Chris Santos, and Jordan Andino	September 25, 2018
Ingredients: Appetizer: chayote, hot sauce packets, tequila blanco, beef tongue; Entrée: pork shoulder, chile rellenos, refried beans, reposado tequila; Dessert: flan, guava, cinnamon sugar taco shells, mezcal; Contestants: Samantha Roberts, Corporate Chef from Scottsdale, AZ (eliminated after the appetizer); Jake McPeck, Food Truck Chef/Owner from Orange County, CA (eliminated after the entrée); Eric Tran, Private Chef from New York, NY (eliminated after the dessert); Tommy D'Ambrosio, Executive Chef and Owner from Phoenix, AZ (winner); Notes: The baskets in this episode featured taco ingredients and different tequilas.
467	10	"Rocky Mountain Masters"	Chris Santos, Alex Guarnaschelli, and Scott Conant	December 25, 2018
Ingredients: Appetizer: radicchio la rosa, noni toki, spinach dip, rocky mountain oysters; Entrée: striped bass, green chile pickle, couscous, root beer float; Dessert: baba al limoncello, blueberry jam, pepitas, jackfruit; Contestants: Dylan Boepple, Lead Line Cook from Portland, ME (eliminated after the appetizer); Cedric Gayon, Chef Tournant from Las Vegas, NV (eliminated after the entrée); James Trees, Chef and Owner from Las Vegas, NV (eliminated after the dessert); Tara Khattar, Caterer and Food Consultant from New York, NY (winner)
468	11	"Chicken Challenge"	Chris Santos, Amanda Freitag, and Stephanie Izard	February 19, 2019
Ingredients: Appetizer: escarole. egg drop soup, dumpling mix, confit black chicken; Entrée: poussin, shakshuka, pea tendrils, whipped cream vodka; Dessert: chicken fried rice, cream-filled chocolate eggs, dried apricots, chili oil; Contestants: Christian Souvenir, Chef de Tournant from Brooklyn, NY (eliminated after the appetizer); Peng Looi, Executive Chef from Louisville, KY (eliminated after the entrée); Erica Lent, Executive Sous Chef from Greenwich, CT (eliminated after the dessert); Dallas McGarity, Chef & Owner from Louisville, KY (winner); Notes: The theme of this episode was chicken in every round.
469	12	"Beer and Brats"	Chris Santos, Alex Guarnaschelli, and Hans Röckenwagner	February 26, 2019
Ingredients: Appetizer: Thuringian bratwurst, beer cheese dip, beer potato chips, baby leeks; Entrée: smoked bratwurst, rutabaga, beer flight, zwiebelkuchen; Dessert: cake brats, Bavarian cream, beer caramel, gooseberries; Contestants: Meghan Levins, Executive Chef from Louisville, KY (eliminated after the appetizer); Marc Lamash, Chef from Garrison, NY (eliminated after the entrée); Ian Ray, Private Chef from Phoenix, AZ (eliminated after the dessert); Lanny Chin, Executive Chef from Las Vegas, NV (winner); Notes: This episode was German themed with a German guest judge. The baskets featured beer and bratwurst. The "beer flight" in the second round consisted of two sour ales, an IPA, and a Scottish ale, all of which were provided by a Nashville brewery owned by regular Chopped judge Maneet Chauhan.
470	13	"Team Ice Cream"	Scott Conant, Chris Santos, and Tyler Malek	June 11, 2019
Ingredients: Appetizer: ice cream cheeseburger, mizuna, lasagna noodles, enchilada sauce; Entrée: duck breast, savory ice cream salad, maraschino cherries, delicata squash; Dessert: goat's milk, chocolate shell coating, fruit pizza, horseradish; Contestants: Brant Dadaleares, Chef and Owner from Portland, ME (eliminated after the appetizer); Alycia Harrington, Line Cook from New York, NY (eliminated after the entrée); Sakari Smithwick, Chef de Partie from New York, NY (eliminated after the dessert); Jessica Quinn, Pastry Sous Chef from Brooklyn, NY (winner); Notes: The theme of this episode was ice cream in every round, and the chefs had to make ice cream in the dessert round. The cheeseburger in round 1 had a fried ice cream ball as one of the toppings (along with lettuce, cheese and tomato). Chef Brant forgot one of his ingredients which led to his elimination. The salad in round 2 was a salad with a scoop of frozen ranch dressing. A second ice cream machine was brought in for the dessert round.

=== Season 38 (2018–19) ===
No. overall	No. in season	Title	Judges	Original release date
471	1	"Plum Luck"	Geoffrey Zakarian, Tiffani Faison, and Chris Santos	May 15, 2018
Ingredients: Appetizer: pad thai pancakes, frozen peas, plums, duck sausage; Entrée: sirlion tip center roast, cinnamon toaster pastries, upland cress, salad cream; Dessert: cereal cake, coconut jam, persimmons, almond butter; Contestants: Alejandro Perez, Executive Chef (eliminated after the appetizer); Anthony Brynildsen, Chef de Partie (eliminated after the entrée); Dalia David, Private Chef (eliminated after the dessert); Adam Allison, Chef and Owner (winner); Notes: In the appetizer round, Chef Dalia left the duck sausage off Chris's plate, but still managed to survive the round.
472	2	"Hot Off the Grill!"	Scott Conant, Marcus Samuelsson, and James Briscione	May 22, 2018
Ingredients: Appetizer: corn on the cob milkshake, zucchini ribbon skewers, camel ribeye, smoked butter; Entrée: brook trout, candy apples, fermented kale slaw, hickory smoked sausage; Dessert: frozen s'mores, whiskey-smoked sugar, fennel, charcoal burger buns; Contestants: Matthew Katakis, Chef and Owner, Butcher Bar from Queens, NY (eliminated after the appetizer); Jacob Styburski, owner/pitmaster Revenge BBQ from Irvington, NY (eliminated after the entrée); Elizabeth Bova, Joe Leone’s dir. of operations from Point Pleasant Beach, NJ (eliminated after the dessert); Lynette Mosher, EC of The DiLuigi Sausage Co. from Danvers, MA (winner)
473	3	"Bowled Over"	Martha Stewart, Geoffrey Zakarian, and Marc Murphy	June 12, 2018
Ingredients: Appetizer: tuna loin, finger radishes, soy cooked eggs, seven layer dip; Entrée: canned cheese ravioli, broccoli rabe, lime pickle, pork secreto; Dessert: halo-halo, vincotto, blondies, candy-glazed kettle corn; Contestants: Jeff Kraus, Chef and Owner from Tempe, AZ (eliminated after the appetizer); Chris Castro, Chef de Cuisine from Scottsdale, AZ (eliminated after the entrée); Carinna Acevedo, Executive Chef from New York, NY (eliminated after the dessert); Yuri Szarzewski, Executive Chef and Owner from Las Vegas, NV (winner); Notes: Every dish in this episode had to be served and presented in a bowl.
474	4	"Doughnut Dash"	Martha Stewart, Marcus Samuelsson, and Chris Santos	June 19, 2018
Ingredients: Appetizer: a dozen doughnuts, corned beef brisket, Chinese celery, mostarda; Entrée: three ring doughnut, ground bison, rainbow carrots, pastry cream; Dessert: Martha's sour cream doughnut dough, beet chips, raclette, yuzu; Contestants: Francis Legge, Executive Pastry Chef from Queens, NY (eliminated after the appetizer); Lindsey Farr, Pastry Chef from New York, NY (eliminated after the entrée); Huascar Aquino, Pastry Chef & Owner from New York, NY (eliminated after the dessert); Joyce Bucad, Assistant Pastry Chef from Las Vegas, NV (winner); Notes: The theme of this episode was doughnuts in every basket, and the chefs had to make doughnuts in the final round. The dough in the third round basket was made by Martha Stewart. Chef Francis previously competed on Season 5 of the American version of MasterChef in 2014, finishing in 11th place.
475	5	"Room for 'Shrooms"	Martha Stewart, Alex Guarnaschelli, and Geoffrey Zakarian	July 10, 2018
Ingredients: Appetizer: mushroom cocktail, winter melon, snow pea tips, monkfish liver; Entrée: porcini creme brulee, veal chops, purple asparagus, bacon shell mac & cheese tacos; Dessert: mushroom jerky, grenadine, granola, lemon meringue pie; Contestants: Richard Daniel Meissner, Line Cook from South Brooklyn, NY (eliminated after the appetizer); Enzo Pezone, Chef & Owner from Manhattan, NY (eliminated after the entrée); Emily Brubaker, Chef from Las Vegas, NV (eliminated after the dessert); Matthew Ginn, Executive Chef from Portland, ME (winner); Notes: The theme of this episode was mushrooms in every basket with an additional, wide variety of mushrooms in the pantry.
476	6	"Beach Bites"	Marc Murphy, Amanda Freitag, and Marcus Samuelsson	July 24, 2018
Ingredients: Appetizer: deluxe seafood platter, coconut chutney, coleslaw mix, deviled egg boats; Entrée: whole red snapper, sweet starfish, arugula, clam bake; Dessert: rum runners, bucket of sand pudding, salt water taffy, watermelon; Contestants: Sean Collins, Chef de Cuisine from Las Vegas, NV (eliminated after the appetizer); David Belknap, Executive Chef & Co-Founder from New York, NY (eliminated after the entrée); Paul Castro, Chef de Cuisine from New York, NY (eliminated after the dessert); Rachael Polhill, Executive Chef from New York, NY (winner); Notes: This episode had beach and sea-themed ingredients in every basket (meaning seafood as well as picnic-type foods that people might take and eat at the beach). The sweet starfish in round 2 were rice crispy treats shaped like stars. The rum runner in round 3 was a cocktail consisting of dark and light rums, pineapple juice, banana liqueur, and cranberry juice.
477	7	"Bar Fight"	Maneet Chauhan, Chris Santos, and Amanda Freitag	January 1, 2019
Ingredients: Appetizer: fried chicken Bloody Mary, bubble blossoms, star pasta, kola nut syrup; Entrée: lamb chops, shishito peppers, peppermint shot glasses, pommes Anna; Dessert: strawberry rhubarb pie, worm salt, empanada wrappers, frozen rosé; Contestants: Juyoung Kang, Lead Bartender from Las Vegas, NV (eliminated after the appetizer); Moses Laboy, Beverage Manager from New York, NY (eliminated after the entrée); Jeremy Ross, Beverage Director from Ashburn, VA (eliminated after the dessert); Jason Asher, Owner & Mixologist from Phoenix, AZ (winner); Notes: Each basket had at least one bar food/ingredient and all four contestants were bartenders. Though it was not mandatory, some contestants made cocktails to pair with their dishes.
478	8	"Nourish and Flourish"	Scott Conant, Alex Guarnaschelli, and Seamus Mullen	January 8, 2019
Ingredients: Appetizer: sardines, Jew's mallow, bone broth, turmeric ice cream; Entrée: radicchio, savory oatmeal, beef tenderloin, chocolate with chili; Dessert: blueberries, walnuts in the shell, white bean cookie dough dip, ginger tonic; Contestants: Danielle Ennesser-Quirino, Chef & Owner from Scottsdale, AZ (eliminated after the appetizer); Lex Grant, Private Chef & Owner from Newark, NJ (eliminated after the entrée); Jacob Pitts, Executive Sous Chef from Manassas, VA (eliminated after the dessert); Jermain Edwards, Executive Chef from New York, NY (winner); Notes: The theme of this episode was "good food that's good for you", meaning lighter and healthier ingredients in every basket and every dish. In the entree round Lex forgot to plate a basket ingredient (chocolate with chili).
479	9	"Deadly Catch"	Scott Conant, Amanda Freitag, and Geoffrey Zakarian	January 15, 2019
Ingredients: Appetizer: Alaska king crab, kelp jerky, saltwater, finger limes; Entrée: striped marlin loin, jellyfish salad, sea beans, cracked freekeh; Dessert: tidal wave cake, Indian blackberries, water caltrops, sea urchin; Contestants: Ken Arneson, Executive chef from Scottsdale, AZ (eliminated after the appetizer); Sarah Wong, Butcher & Catering Chef from Philadelphia, PA (eliminated after the entrée); Will Gilson, Chef & owner from Cambridge, MA (eliminated after the dessert); Joshua Moore, Executive chef & co-owner from Louisville, KY (winner); Notes: Each basket had seafood ingredients that were dangerous to obtain. In the dessert round, hammers were provided to help the chefs crack open the caltrops, and Ted warned the chefs that the caltrops were toxic if not cooked.
480	10	"Wonton Wonder"	Geoffrey Zakarian, Maneet Chauhan, and Chris Santos	February 12, 2019
Ingredients: Appetizer: scallions, water chestnuts, wonton wrappers, hot dog éclairs; Entrée: pheasant, green tomatoes, tepache liqueur, trash can nachos; Dessert: moon grapes, apricot paste, bagel chips, pickle cupcakes; Contestants: Nicole Palazzolo, Chef & Co-Owner from Malden, MA (eliminated after the appetizer); Tarun Kapoor, Chef & Owner from Las Vegas, NV (eliminated after the entrée); Patrick Carter, Executive Chef from New Albany, IN (eliminated after the dessert); Kristina Wisneski, Executive Chef from Bryn Mawr, PA (winner)
481	11	"Meat Your Match"	Alex Guarnaschelli, Marc Murphy, and Kari Underly	March 5, 2019
Ingredients: Appetizer: ambrosia salad, dandelion greens, charcuterie cone, beef short loin; Entrée: Moroccan mint tea, fresh chickpeas, pâté en croûte, lamb shoulder; Dessert: Asian pears, steamed buns, 'nduja, pork leg; Contestants: Samantha Naomi, Butcher from Brooklyn, NY (eliminated after the appetizer); Judy Yao, Butcher from Cambridge, MA (eliminated after the entrée); Erin Hockey, Butcher from Worcester, MA (eliminated after the dessert); Elise Miller, Butcher from Portland, ME (winner); Notes: All four chefs were female butchers. All rounds were entree rounds consisting of 45 minutes to allow enough time to butcher the proteins. The meat in each basket were pieces so large that they had to be grabbed from the pantry.
482	12	"Gefilte Dish"	Scott Conant, Amanda Freitag, and Marcus Samuelsson	March 12, 2019
Ingredients: Appetizer: gefilte fish, margarita cotton candy, rainbow beets, jumbo pretzels; Entrée: lomo Ibérico de Bellota, black rice congee, circus peanuts, moringa drumsticks; Dessert: cheese tea, chocolate-covered corn, Bing cherries, fried peanut butter & jelly balls; Contestants: J. Amonson, Executive Chef from Scottsdale, AZ (eliminated after the appetizer); Carolina Curtin, Executive Chef from Cambridge, MA (eliminated after the entrée); Justin Kingsley Hall, Chef de Cuisine from Las Vegas, NV (eliminated after the dessert); Claude Lewis, Chef de Cuisine from Jersey City, NJ (winner)
483	13	"Dill Dilemma"	Marc Murphy, Amanda Freitag, and Jordan Andino	May 28, 2019
Ingredients: Appetizer: Arctic char fillets, shiso leaves, chicken liver pâté, dill pickle lollipops; Entrée: pork crown roast, sundried tomatoes, hotdish, marsala wine; Dessert: banana pudding, gjetost cheese, watermelon, candy-coated fennel seeds; Contestants: John "Doc" Dougherty, Chef de Cuisine from Asbury Park, NJ (eliminated after the appetizer); Melissa O'Shea, Head Chef from Point Pleasant, NJ (eliminated after the entrée); Liz Kwon, Chef & Co-Owner from Brooklyn, NY (eliminated after the dessert); John Courtney, Culinary Director from Las Vegas, NV (winner); Notes: Chef John Courtney cut his knuckle in the third round.

=== Season 39 (2018–19) ===
No. overall	No. in season	Title	Judges	Original release date
484	1	"Think Small!"	Martha Stewart, Chris Santos, and Marc Murphy	June 26, 2018
Ingredients: Appetizer: baby eggplant, pickled daikon, lamb merguez, grilled cheese & tomato soup dumplings; Entrée: patatas bravas, tzatziki, quail eggs, raw pork sandwiches; Dessert: chocolate-dipped churros, roasted chick peas, satsuma mandarins, caramel budino; Contestants: Tavis Rockwell, Executive Chef from Louisville, KY (eliminated after the appetizer); Adam Pusateri, Chef and Owner from Las Vegas, NV (eliminated after the entrée); Paula Alencar, Sous Chef from Philadelphia, PA (eliminated after the dessert); Thomas Tapat, Sous Chef from Las Vegas, NV (winner); Notes: The theme of this round was small plates in every round. The chefs had to create at least two different tasting plates for the judges to share. The first round lasted 30 minutes instead of 20 to allow adequate time to make multiple different dishes.
485	2	"Lamb Slam"	Martha Stewart, Alex Guarnaschelli, and Marc Murphy	July 3, 2018
Ingredients: Appetizer: spring onions, porgy, nori, french fry-crusted corn dogs; Entrée: lamb sirloin, sunchokes, grasshopper pie, anchovies in brine; Dessert: brigadeiro, panettone, bergamot, butter coffee; Contestants: Elliot Williams, Director of Culinary from Westford, MA (eliminated after the appetizer); Asia Mei, Chef & Owner from South Boston, MA (eliminated after the entrée); Zach Pratt, Chef & Owner from Lewiston, ME (eliminated after the dessert); Nicholas Poulmentis, Executive Chef from New York, NY (winner)
486	3	"Wellington Woes"	Martha Stewart, Geoffrey Zakarian, and Chris Santos	September 18, 2018
Ingredients: Appetizer: beef wellington pops, kohlrabi, herbed spaetzle, canned spiced ham; Entrée: halibut cheeks, hot dog broth, preserved lemons, zucchini blossoms; Dessert: chocoflan, fruit bouquet, peanut brittle, mamajuana; Contestants: Justin Woodard, Corporate Executive Chef from Phoenix, AZ (eliminated after the appetizer); Landen Garcia, Executive Chef from New York, NY (eliminated after the entrée); Elyssa Kaplan, Sous Chef from Cambridge, MA (eliminated after the dessert); Laura Gonzalez, Chef de Cuisine from Paradise Valley, AZ (winner)
487	4	"Breakfast Battle"	Martha Stewart, Amanda Freitag, and Marc Murphy	December 18, 2018
Ingredients: Appetizer: breakfast in bread, orange juice, frozen hash browns, kale sprouts; Entrée: beghrir, skirt steak, spicy candies, farm fresh eggs; Dessert: breakfast sausage, maple syrup cheese, congee, French toast; Contestants: Teerawong "Yo" Nanthavatsiri, Chef and Owner from Manhattan, NY (eliminated after the appetizer); Nick Dixon, Executive Chef from Boston, MA (eliminated after the entrée); Brianna Bowering, Sous Chef from Boston, MA (eliminated after the dessert); Eric Felitto, Chef and Owner from Fairfield, CT (winner); Notes: The theme of this episode was breakfast. The contestants had to make breakfast versions of each round (appetizer, entrée, dessert) and there was at least one breakfast ingredient in each basket. The round 1 "breakfast in bread" ingredient was eggs and bacon in a sourdough breadbowl.
488	5	"Pizza Poetry"	Chris Santos, Alex Guarnaschelli, and Geoffrey Zakarian	March 19, 2019
Ingredients: Appetizer: mac & cheese, escarole, New York-style dough, pig's head; Entrée: oxtail, cola slushie, banana blossoms in brine, Detroit-style dough; Dessert: dulce de leche, preserved green olives, mini chocolate bars. Neopolitan-style dough; Contestants: Giulio Adriani, Restaurateur and Pizzaiolo from Atlanta, GA (eliminated after the appetizer); Vincent Rotolo, Owner and Head Pizzaiolo from Las Vegas, NV (eliminated after the entrée); John Arena, Owner and Co-founder from Las Vegas, NV (eliminated after the dessert); Nino Coniglio, Chef and Owner from Brooklyn, NY (winner); Notes: The competitors were "pizzaiolos" ‒ chefs specializing in making pizza ‒ who had to make pizza in every round. Round 1 was extended to 30 minutes to allow the chefs enough time to cook their pizzas.
489	6	"Dollar Dishes"	Scott Conant, Alex Guarnaschelli, and Tiffani Faison	March 26, 2019
Ingredients: Appetizer: frozen taquitos, dozen eggs, frozen corn, home grown basil; Entrée: beef tripe stew, chicken legs, broccoli, instant mashed potatoes; Dessert: blueberry muffin mix, cream cheese, carrots, white wine ice cubes; Contestants: Stephan Brezinsky, Chef and Owner from New York, NY (eliminated after the appetizer); Allen Fisher, Executive Sous Chef from Woodstock, NY (eliminated after the entrée); Sebastian Wijata, Chef from Scottsdale, AZ (eliminated after the dessert); Figgy DiBenedetto, Chef and Owner from Portland, ME (winner); Notes: The theme of this episode was low-cost ingredients in every basket.
490	7	"Pasta Possibilities"	Scott Conant, Amanda Freitag, and Evan Funke	April 2, 2019
Ingredients: Appetizer: hamachi collar, bone marrow, pea tendrils, pickled pork skins; Entrée: braised lamb shanks, artichokes, Jordan almonds, tomato mozzarella salad; Dessert: giant cannoli, strawberry toaster pastries, chamomile grappa, kumquats; Contestants: Massimiliano Eandi, Executive Chef from New York, NY (eliminated after the appetizer); Allison Fasano, Chef from New York, NY (eliminated after the entrée); Andy Richmer, Chef and Owner from Madison, IN (eliminated after the dessert); Pawan Pinisetti, Executive Chef from Las Vegas, NV (winner); Notes: The theme of this episode was pasta. The contestants had to make pasta in every round. The pantry had various types of pastas that the chefs could use.
491	8	"You've Got Snail"	Scott Conant, Amanda Freitag, and Maneet Chauhan	April 9, 2019
Ingredients: Appetizer: whelks, carbonated candy, Fresno chiles, baby fennel; Entrée: scallops in the shell, mortadella, purple Brussels sprouts, stuffed croissants; Dessert: pig's feet, blood oranges, salted honey custard pie, blackstrap molasses; Contestants: Ilson Goncalves, Chef and Owner from Montclair, NJ (eliminated after the appetizer); Darius Chase, Sous Chef from Louisville, KY (eliminated after the entrée); Aless Mac Carthy, Owner/Caterer from New York, NY (eliminated after the dessert); Anna Vocaturo, Chef Partner from Washington, D.C (winner); Notes: The stuffed croissant in the second round was matcha tea flavored and stuffed with lemon curd. At the end of the second round, Chef Darius discovered he cut himself, and as a result his dishes couldn't be tasted due to a possible contamination. In the third round, Chef Anna also cut herself but caught the injury in time, and had to redo her dish.
492	9	"Squab Goals"	Marc Murphy, Alex Guarnaschelli, and Chris Santos	April 16, 2019
Ingredients: Appetizer: squab, canned peanut soup, mustard greens, salted peaches; Entrée: jumbo fluke, roasted spaghetti squash, tropical punch, octopus balls; Dessert: cricket cookie mix, mountain rose apples, almond vegan yogurt, jerk seasoning; Contestants: Chris Moore, Chef from Memphis, TN (eliminated after the appetizer); Coco Kim, Sous Chef from New York, NY (eliminated after the entrée); Janene Holig, Executive Chef and Co-Founder from Minneapolis, MN (eliminated after the dessert); Nick LaRosa, Executive Chef and Owner from Phoenix, AZ (winner)
493	10	"Viewers Rule"	Chris Santos, Maneet Chauhan, and Marcus Samuelsson	April 23, 2019
Ingredients: Appetizer: rainbow gelatin, frozen pizza, horseradish root, creamed beef in a can; Entrée: burger buddy meal mix, bitter melon, raspberry vinaigrette, balut; Dessert: cocktail onions, pumpkin spice latte, salmon ice cream, apple pie filling; Contestants: Lex Taylor, Chef and Owner from Ossining, NY (eliminated after the appetizer); Stavros Karipides, Chef and Owner from Greenwich, CT (eliminated after the entrée); Aziza "Z" Young, Executive Chef from Philadelphia, PA (eliminated after the dessert); Eyhab "Happy" Hatab, Executive Chef from Mount Laurel, NJ (winner); Notes: This was a viewers' choice episode. The basket ingredients were chosen by fans via social media (Facebook, Instagram, and Twitter). Chef Z, going by her real name, Aziza, previously competed on the sixteenth season of Gordon Ramsay's Hell's Kitchen in 2016, finishing in thirteenth place.
494	11	"Belly of the Beast"	Chris Santos, Alex Guarnaschelli, and Marc Murphy	April 30, 2019
Ingredients: Appetizer: tuna belly, black trumpet mushrooms, pickled ramps, fish pâté; Entrée: lamb belly, lamb's lettuce, rice-vermicelli mix, prairie chicken cocktail; Dessert: pork belly, crystallized ginger, lady gala apples, piggy dumplings; Contestants: Justin Loo, Executive Chef from Las Vegas, NV (eliminated after the appetizer); Mac Jarvis, Chef de Cuisine from Jackson Hole, WY (eliminated after the entrée); Lucas Billheimer, Executive Chef from New York, NY (eliminated after the dessert); Matt Migliore, Sous Chef from Brooklyn, NY (winner); Notes: The theme of this episode was different animal belly meat in each basket. The chicken cocktail in round 2 contained gin, salt, pepper, and a raw chicken egg. The piggy dumpling in round 3 was a steamed bun that looked like a pig (with edible nose, eyes, and ears) and was filled with custard. In round 1, Chef Justin plated a sauce on two plates with one of the basket ingredients (pickled ramps) after time was called, leading to his elimination. In round 2, Chef Mac forgot the lamb's lettuce and chicken cocktail on 1 of his plates, resulting in him getting eliminated. All 4 chefs were men, though Chef Mac said he had recently identified as transgender.
495	12	"Brunch Brilliance"	Chris Santos, Alex Guarnaschelli, and Maneet Chauhaun	May 7, 2019
Ingredients: Appetizer: duck bacon, chicken & waffles ice cream, tomatillos, corn tortillas; Entrée: deep-fried poached eggs, smoked black cod, watermelon radish, onion snack rings; Dessert: boozy cereal, pink grapefruit, ostrich egg, red velvet pancakes; Contestants: Matt Drummond, Executive Chef from South Boston, MA (eliminated after the appetizer); Jamie Landers, Chef and Owner from Philadelphia, PA (eliminated after the entrée); Bahr Rapaport, Chef and Owner from New York, NY (eliminated after the dessert); Gregory Headen, Sous Chef from Philadelphia, PA (winner); Notes: The theme of this episode was brunch, with every basket containing ingredients associated with brunch. The boozy cereal in round 3 was cinnamon squares in a cup of cream and Caribbean rum.
496	13	"Eat Your Veggies"	Martha Stewart, Alex Guarnaschelli, and Marcus Samuelsson	May 14, 2019
Ingredients: Appetizer: green bean pops, assorted cauliflower, turnips, dinosaur kale; Entrée: rose radicchio, kabocha squash, avocado toast, baby artichokes; Dessert: chocolate-covered crickets, baby spinach, rhubarb, lemon zucchini bread; Contestants: Joe Cadina, Executive Sous Chef from Las Vegas, NV (eliminated after the appetizer); Tamara Stanger, Executive Chef from Phoenix, AZ (eliminated after the entrée); Mike Joyce, Chef de Cuisine from Philadelphia, PA (eliminated after the dessert); Cory Oppold, Executive Chef from Scottsdale, AZ (winner); Notes: This was a vegetable-centric episode with vegetables in every basket.

=== Season 40 (2018–19) ===
No. overall	No. in season	Title	Judges	Original release date
497	1	"Fire it Up!"	Geoffrey Zakarian, Alex Guarnaschelli, and Marcus Samuelsson	July 17, 2018
Ingredients: Appetizer: chicken wings, jicama, spicy cheese puffs, Kosher dill pickles; Entrée: chuck strip steaks, chili, dinosaur kale, jalapeño cheesecake ice cream; Dessert: cherries jubilee, sriracha mayonnaise, mango, smoked chocolate chips; Contestants: Marissa Bergen, Firefighter & Paramedic from Trenton, NJ (eliminated after the appetizer); Nick Triscari, Firefighter & Chef Owner from New Rochelle, NY (eliminated after the entrée); Monkonjay Gray, Firefighter & Cheesecake Chef from Greensboro, NC (eliminated after the dessert); Daniel Brelsford, Firefighter & Cooking Instructor from Bridgeport, CT (winner); Notes: All the contestants in this episode were firefighters. Firehouse Subs sponsored this episode and donated $25,000 to the Firehouse Subs Public Safety Foundation in honor of the competitors. Marissa cut herself in Round 1. A second deep-fryer was provided in the appetizer round to help ensure all the chefs managed to cook the chicken wings. The cherries jubilee in the third round was presented in a pan and on fire, inside the basket, surprising the competitors. This episode was dedicated to Keith Young, an FDNY firefighter and Chopped Champion who died on March 17, 2018.
498	2	"Whiz Kid Cooks"	Marc Murphy, Amanda Freitag, and Geoffrey Zakarian	September 4, 2018
Ingredients: Appetizer: ground chicken, rapini, lemon sorbet, tahini paste; Entrée: flat iron steak, sprouting cauliflower, waffle fries, dates; Dessert: Linzer cookies, baby kiwis, cherry kombucha, candy dispenser; Contestants: Ryan Greenberg (age 12) from Livingston, NJ (eliminated after the appetizer); Django Santalis (age 10) from Patterson, NY (eliminated after the entrée); Pipa Hardin (age 12) from Campbell, CA (eliminated after the dessert); Rachel Goldzal (age 12) from Staten Island, NY (winner); Notes: The contestants in this episode were all children. Instead of the usual 20 minutes, the first round was extended to 30 minutes. In the third round, the kids were given miniature gumball machines filled with candy and a roll of quarters to get the candy out.
499	3	"Halloween Hijinks"	Martha Stewart, Alex Guarnaschelli, and Geoffrey Zakarian	October 2, 2018
Ingredients: Appetizer: spooky baked rat meatballs, Swiss chard, mac o'lanterns & cheese, eye-tini; Entrée: bloody brain shrimp cocktail, green Romano beans, spider web mashed potatoes, cauldron curry; Dessert: haunted gingerbread house, prickly pears, chocolate stuffed creepy crawlies, meringue bones; Contestants: Edwin Anthony Rodriguez, Chef from Brooklyn, NY (eliminated after the appetizer); Samantha Sanz, Chef de Cuisine from Scottsdale, AZ (eliminated after the entrée); Marino Rosato, Executive Chef from New York, NY (eliminated after the dessert); Christine Hazel, Traveling Chef from Philadelphia, PA (winner); Notes: This was a Halloween themed episode. In the first round: the "rat" meatballs were regular meatballs with edible fake rat ears and eyes on it, the "mac o'lanterns" were orange bell peppers carved into jack o'lantern faces and filled with mac and cheese, and the eye-tini was a martini with a fake eyeball (lychee with blueberry) stuck in it. In the second round: the shrimp cocktail was served in chilled gelatin inside a prop head bust, and the loaded mashed potatoes had a spider web design piped on with sour cream. In the third round: the "creepy crawlies" were dates cut to resemble bugs, and the meringue was in the shape of bones. Chef Christine Hazel also appeared on season 14 of Hell's Kitchen.
500	4	"Chopped Champs Throwdown: Battle 1"	Chris Santos, Alex Guarnaschelli, and Marc Murphy	October 9, 2018
Ingredients: Appetizer: smelt, rainbow carrots, pork sticks, turmeric tea; Entrée: rack of venison, salty licorice, green tomatoes, blueberry pie filling; Dessert: cotton candy burrito, mangoes, macadamia nuts, milk jam; Contestants: Syrena Johnson, Private Chef and Caterer from New Orleans, LA (Episode 35.19 - "Mardi Gras Goals") (eliminated after the appetizer); Heather Carr, Sous Chef from Denver, CO (Episode 33.1 - "Best Laid Pans") (eliminated after the entrée); Franco Robazetti, Executive Chef from Jersey City, NJ (Episode 37.7 - "Surf and Turf") (eliminated after the dessert); Evan Hennessey, Executive Chef & Owner from Dover, NH (Episode 37.5 - "Leftover Takeover") (advances to final round) (winner); Notes: This was the first of a five-part tournament, where sixteen past champions competed. The winner of each preliminary round advanced to the finale, where they competed for $50,000. In the appetizer round, Franco forgot the carrots but moved on because Syrena did not cook her smelt. The judges did not eat her dish as a result, citing the risks of parasites from freshwater fish.
501	5	"Chopped Champs Throwdown: Battle 2"	Marc Murphy, Maneet Chauhan, and Chris Santos	October 16, 2018
Ingredients: Appetizer: fermented rice pudding, grape jelly meatballs, Swiss chard, black garlic; Entrée: tri-tip, kohlrabi, giant jawbreaker, pesto sauce; Dessert: popcorn bowl of treats, cherries, pinot noir, ground coffee; Contestants: Kenneth Temple, Private Chef, New Orleans, LA (Episode 35.11 - "Pie Jinks") (eliminated after the appetizer); Chris Paulikas, Executive Sous Chef from Philadelphia, PA (Episode 35.20 - "Dim Sum Yum") (eliminated after the entrée); Christopher Royster, Chef de Cuisine, Flagstaff House, Boulder, CO (Episode 31.11 - "Beast Feast") (eliminated after the dessert); Adriana Urbina, Chef and Owner, Tepuy Dining, New York, NY (Episode 32.11 - "Latin Cuisine Dream") (advances to final round) (winner); Notes: This is the second part of a five-part tournament.
502	6	"Chopped Champs Throwdown: Battle 3"	Scott Conant, Amanda Freitag, and Geoffrey Zakarian	October 23, 2018
Ingredients: Appetizer: uni, pea shoots, cucumber potato chips, imitation crab; Entrée: vanilla milkshake, boneless beef shank, eggplants, xo sauce; Dessert: coconut curry simmering sauce, papaya, tamarind pods, giant peanut butter cup; Contestants: Nicholas Poulmentis, Executive Chef from New York, NY (Episode 39.2 - "Lamb Slam") (eliminated after the appetizer); Andrew Riccatelli, Chef de Cuisine, Terroir, New York, NY (Episode 32.10 - "Something Dumpling") (eliminated after the entrée); Lynette Mosher, Executive Chef from Danvers, MA (Episode 38.2 - "Hot Off the Grill!") (eliminated after the dessert); Tatiana Rosana, Executive Chef from Boston, MA (Episode 37.8 - "Under the Cuban Sun") (advances to final round) (winner); Notes: This is the third part of a five-part tournament.
503	7	"Chopped Champs Throwdown: Battle 4"	Scott Conant, Alex Guarnaschelli, and Marc Murphy	October 30, 2018
Ingredients: Appetizer: pickled turnips, sweet potatoes, quail eggs, Moroccan dried beef; Entrée: red snapper, watermelon, zucchini blossoms, pandan pancakes; Dessert: sfogliatelle, raspberries, black walnuts in syrup, matcha pops; Contestants: Dave Hadley, Sous Chef, The Preservery, Denver, CO (Episode 32.8 - "Chefs in a Pickle) (eliminated after the appetizer); Adam Allison, Chef & Owner from Mesa, AZ (Episode 38.1 - "Plum Luck) (eliminated after the entrée); Airis Johnson, Private Chef, ATC Spice Blends, Brooklyn, NY (Episode 35.8 - "Feel the Burn") (eliminated after the dessert); Matthew Ginn, Executive Chef from Portland, ME (Episode 38.5 - "Room for 'Shrooms") (advances to final round) (winner); Notes: This is the fourth part of a five-part tournament.
504	8	"Chopped Champs Throwdown: Finale"	Scott Conant, Amanda Freitag, and Marc Murphy	November 6, 2018
Ingredients: Appetizer: shad roe, coffee creamers, watermelon radishes, pork belly; Entrée: goat head, merguez sausage, pignoli cookies, spruce tips; Dessert: honeycomb, peaches, mosaic gelatin, smoked duck; Contestants: Evan Hennessey, Executive Chef & Owner from Dover, NH (Episode 37.5 - "Leftover Takeover") (eliminated after the appetizer); Matthew Ginn, Executive Chef from Portland, ME (Episode 38.5 - "Room for 'Shrooms") (eliminated after the entrée); Tatiana Rosana, Executive Chef from Boston, MA (Episode 37.8 - "Under the Cuban Sun") (eliminated after the dessert); Adriana Urbina, Chef and Owner, Tepuy Dining, New York, NY (Episode 32.11 - "Latin Cuisine Dream") (winner); Notes: This is the final part of a five-part tournament.
505	9	"Thankful Siblings"	Scott Conant, Tiffani Faison, and Chris Santos	November 13, 2018
Ingredients: Appetizer: pork tenderloin, baby kale, turkey jerky, onion rings casserole; Entrée: rainbow chard, vegducken, pumpkin dinner rolls, leg of lamb; Dessert: candied yam latte, popcorn on the cob, unbaked cinnamon roll pie, figs; Contestants: Ted and Lisa Allen (charity: Reach Higher) (eliminated after the appetizer); Marc and Paul Murphy (charity: No Kid Hungry) (eliminated after the entrée); Maneet and Reeti Chauhan (charity: March of Dimes) (eliminated after the dessert); Amanda and Jason Freitag (charity: God's Love We Deliver) (winner); Notes: This was a Thanksgiving themed episode where three Chopped judges, and Ted Allen, were joined by their siblings to compete for their charities of choice. Since Ted was competing, the judges took turns performing his hosting duties, and unveiling who got chopped each round (Scott presented the first round, Tiffani presented the second round, and Chris presented the third round).
506	10	"Tea Eggs and Sympathy"	Marcus Samuelsson, Martha Stewart, and Maneet Chauhan	November 27, 2018
Ingredients: Appetizer: yu choy, chicken schmaltz, Chinese tea eggs, quahog clams; Entrée: arctic char, pig ears, pizza hamantaschen, rhubarb; Dessert: eggplants in syrup, wafer sheets, Mexican chocolates, durian; Contestants: Leah Eubanks, Sous Chef from Nashville, TN (eliminated after the appetizer); Nicole Poirier, Private Chef/Caterer from San Francisco, CA (eliminated after the entrée); Pujan Sarkar, Chef De Cuisine from San Francisco, CA (eliminated after the dessert); Eli Dunn, Chef and Owner from Warren, RI (winner)
507	11	"Holly Jolly Grandmas"	Scott Conant, Amanda Freitag, and Maneet Chauhan	December 4, 2018
Ingredients: Appetizer: buffalo tenderloin, chicken candy canes, frozen peas, latke tower; Entrée: golden goose, spiked egg nog, purple asparagus, jelly doughnut bites; Dessert: holiday cookies, pomegranate seeds, cream cheese, hot cocoa mix ornament; Contestants: Altina Lester, Retired Chef from Boston, MA (eliminated after the appetizer); Charisse Chavers, Head Chef from Brooklyn, NY (eliminated after the entrée); Norma Knepp, Chef & Owner from Lancaster, PA (eliminated after the dessert); Ceil Vardar, Retired Caterer from Norwich, CT (winner); Notes: This was a holiday themed episode where grandmothers competed, all of them working or having worked in the kitchen professionally. The first round was increased to 30 minutes instead of the usual 20 minutes.
508	12	"It's a Sibling Thing"	Marc Murphy, Amanda Freitag, and Geoffrey Zakarian	January 22, 2019
Ingredients: Appetizer: jumbo shrimp, mustard greens, whipped cream, ramen pizza; Entrée: goat chops, chayote squash, labne, cookies & cream popcorn; Dessert: Japanese cheesecake, rambutan, strawberry banana juice, fruit rings cereal; Contestants: Quinn Walmer (age 11) & Lyla Walmer (age 9) from Bridgewater, NJ (eliminated after the appetizer); Jackson Rockmel (age 14) & Skyler Rockmel (age 12) from Berkeley, CA (eliminated after the entrée); Sara Bonic (age 14) & Sammy Bonic (age 12) from Cantonsville, MD (eliminated after the dessert); Arielle Wayner (age 13) & Alfie Wayner (age 9) from New Rochelle, NY (winner); Notes: This was a team cook episode where the duos were young siblings. As with most other child-themed Chopped episodes, the first round was extended to 30 minutes.
509	13	"Hotdog Hotshots"	Chris Santos, Amanda Freitag, and Geoffrey Zakarian	July 16, 2019
Ingredients: Appetizer: hot dog cake, mâche, mangos, onion snack ring; Entrée: pickle corn dogs, shishito peppers, canned whipped cream, caviar; Dessert: wieners in a quilt, frozen sour cherries, caramel popcorn, lemon curd; Contestants: Ricardo Arias, Executive Chef from New York, NY (eliminated after the appetizer); Steven Oliver, Chef & Owner from San Diego, CA (eliminated after the entrée); Britni Nelson, Sous Chef from Philadelphia, PA (eliminated after the dessert); Jeff Martino, Chef de Cuisine from Boston, MA (winner); Notes: The theme of this episode was hot dogs in every basket. There were also several different types of hot dogs in the pantry (from venison sausage to cocktail weenies). The "wieners in a quilt" in the third round were hot dogs rolled in crescent dough.

== See also ==
- List of Chopped: Canada episodes
