= List of Chopped episodes (seasons 1–20) =

This is the list of episodes (Seasons 1–20) for the Food Network competition reality series Chopped.

== Series overview ==
Season	Episodes	Originally released	
Season	Episodes	First released	Last released
1	13	January 13, 2009	April 7, 2009
2	13	June 16, 2009	September 29, 2009
3	13	October 13, 2009	March 9, 2010
4	13	April 6, 2010	July 13, 2010
5	13	July 20, 2010	November 28, 2010
6	12	January 4, 2011	April 26, 2011
7	10	May 3, 2011	July 5, 2011
8	9	July 12, 2011	December 6, 2011
9	13	August 30, 2011	December 13, 2011
10	13	December 20, 2011	May 29, 2012
11	13	February 7, 2012	November 25, 2012
12	13	June 5, 2012	November 20, 2012
13	12	September 4, 2012	February 26, 2013
14	13	January 6, 2013	May 5, 2013
15	13	April 2, 2013	July 23, 2013
16	13	June 2, 2013	November 12, 2013
17	13	August 13, 2013	December 3, 2013
18	13	November 26, 2013	May 13, 2014
19	13	February 4, 2014	June 10, 2014
20	13	March 18, 2014	November 25, 2014
21	13	July 15, 2014	January 13, 2015
22	13	October 14, 2014	June 30, 2015
23	13	December 16, 2014	June 16, 2015
24	13	April 28, 2015	December 8, 2015
25	13	August 25, 2015	December 1, 2015
26	8	October 6, 2015	December 17, 2015
27	13	January 5, 2016	March 17, 2016
28	13	March 29, 2016	June 21, 2016
29	13	August 7, 2016	September 27, 2016
30	8	September 22, 2016	December 20, 2016
31	20	October 13, 2016	December 29, 2016
32	12	January 3, 2017	May 2, 2017
33	8	March 21, 2017	May 30, 2017
34	13	May 9, 2017	November 7, 2017
35	20	July 18, 2017	March 6, 2018
36	13	December 12, 2017	June 5, 2018
37	13	March 13, 2018	June 11, 2019
38	13	May 15, 2018	May 28, 2019
39	13	June 26, 2018	May 14, 2019
40	13	July 17, 2018	July 16, 2019
41	13	December 11, 2018	March 31, 2020
42	8	November 20, 2018	June 2, 2020
43	13	July 9, 2019	February 25, 2020
44	13	September 24, 2019	August 4, 2020
45	13	January 21, 2020	July 28, 2020
46	13	July 14, 2020	October 27, 2020
47	13	April 7, 2020	May 25, 2021
48	13	December 15, 2020	March 30, 2021
49	13	November 10, 2020	May 18, 2021
50	18	June 1, 2021	March 22, 2022
51	13	December 28, 2021	April 5, 2022
52	13	April 12, 2022	October 25, 2022
53	13	October 18, 2022	August 8, 2023
54	13	December 27, 2022	March 28, 2023
55	19	April 4, 2023	December 12, 2023
56	13	August 22, 2023	January 30, 2024
57	13	February 6, 2024	August 13, 2024
58	13	April 2, 2024	June 25, 2024
59	13	August 20, 2024	May 6, 2025
60	13	October 15, 2024	July 22, 2025
61	13	January 7, 2025	July 8, 2025
62	13	July 29, 2025	May 5, 2026

== Episodes ==
=== Season 1 (2009) ===
- This season is known for its straight-forward episode titles (listing foods found in the baskets) and the varied number of basket ingredients (some rounds had three ingredients while some rounds had five ingredients).

No. overall	No. in season	Title	Judges	Original release date
1	1	"Octopus, Duck, Animal Crackers"	Marc Murphy, Alex Guarnaschelli, and Aarón Sánchez	January 13, 2009
Ingredients: Appetizer: baby octopus, bok choy, oyster sauce, smoked paprika; Entrée: duck breast, green onions, ginger, honey; Dessert: prunes, animal crackers, cream cheese; Contestants: Summer Kriegshauser, Private Chef and Nutrition Coach, New York, NY (eliminated after the appetizer); Perry Pollaci, Private Chef and Sous Chef, Bar Blanc, New York, NY (eliminated after the entrée); Katie Rosenhouse, Pastry Chef, Olana Restaurant, New York, NY (eliminated after the dessert); Sandy Davis, Catering Chef, Showstoppers Catering at Union Theological Seminary, New York, NY (winner); Notes: This is the first episode with only three ingredients in a basket (dessert round). There would be no set number until season 4.
2	2	"Tofu, Blueberries, Oysters"	Aarón Sánchez, Alex Guarnaschelli, and Marc Murphy	January 20, 2009
Ingredients: Appetizer: firm tofu, tomato paste, prosciutto; Entrée: daikon, pork loin, Napa cabbage, Thai chiles, Blue Point oysters; Dessert: phyllo dough, gorgonzola cheese, pineapple rings, blueberries; Contestants: Raymond Jackson, Private Caterer and Culinary Instructor, Westchester County, NY (eliminated after the appetizer); Klaus Kronsteiner, Chef de cuisine, Liberty National Golf Course, Jersey City, NJ (eliminated after the entrée); Christopher Jackson, Executive Chef and Owner, Ted and Honey, Brooklyn, NY (eliminated after the dessert); Pippa Calland, Owner and Chef, Chef for Hire LLC, Newville, PA (winner); Notes: This is the first episode with five ingredients in a basket (entrée round), as well as three ingredients in the appetizer round.
3	3	"Avocado, Tahini, Bran Flakes"	Aarón Sánchez, Alex Guarnaschelli, and Marc Murphy	January 27, 2009
Ingredients: Appetizer: lump crab meat, dried shiitake mushrooms, pink grapefruit, bran cereal; Entrée: ground beef, cannellini beans, tahini paste, grape jelly; Dessert: brioche, cantaloupe, pecans, avocados; Contestants: Margaritte Malfy, Executive Chef and Co-owner, La Palapa, New York, NY (eliminated after the appetizer); Rachelle Rodwell, Chef de cuisine, SoHo Grand Hotel, New York, NY (eliminated after the entrée); Chris Burke, Private Chef, New York, NY (eliminated after the dessert); Andre Marrero, Chef tournant, L’Atelier de Joël Robuchon, New York, NY (winner)
4	4	"Banana, Collard Greens, Grits"	Scott Conant, Amanda Freitag, and Geoffrey Zakarian	February 3, 2009
Ingredients: Appetizer: ground beef, wonton wrappers, cream of mushroom soup, bananas; Entrée: scallops, collard greens, anchovies, sour cream; Dessert: maple syrup, black plums, almond butter, walnuts, quick grits; Contestants: Sean Chudoba, Executive Chef, Ayza Wine Bar, New York, NY (eliminated after the appetizer); Kyle Shadix, Chef, Registered Dietician and Culinary Consultant, New York, NY (eliminated after the entrée); Luis Gonzales, Executive Chef, Knickerbocker Bar & Grill, New York, NY (eliminated after the dessert); Einat Admony, Chef and Owner, Taïm, New York, NY (winner); Notes: In the appetizer round, Chef Chudoba refused to use bananas in his dish due to his plan failing, leading to his elimination. In the dessert round, Chef Gonzales accidentally used salt instead of sugar in his dish, asserting that this resulted in his elimination.
5	5	"Yucca, Watermelon, Tortillas"	Geoffrey Zakarian, Alex Guarnaschelli, and Marc Murphy	February 10, 2009
Ingredients: Appetizer: watermelon, canned sardines, pepper jack cheese, zucchini; Entrée: beef shoulder, yucca, raisins, ancho chiles, dill pickles; Dessert: flour tortillas, prosecco, Canadian bacon, roasted chestnuts; Contestants: John Keller, Personal Chef, New York, NY (eliminated after the appetizer); Andrea Bergquist, Executive Chef, New York, NY (eliminated after the entrée); Ed Witt, Executive Chef / Wine Director, Bloomingdale Road and Wine Directory, New York, NY (eliminated after the dessert); Josh Emett, Chef de cuisine, Gordon Ramsay at The London, New York, NY (winner)
6	6	"Canned Peaches, Rice Cakes, Beets"	Chris Santos, Alex Guarnaschelli, and Aarón Sánchez	February 17, 2009
Ingredients: Appetizer: asparagus, chorizo, button mushrooms, canned peaches; Entrée: rice cakes, chicken thighs, plantains, fruit punch, cocktail onions; Dessert: beets, goat cheese, quick cook oatmeal, crystallized ginger; Contestants: Cindi Avila, Catering Manager and Chef, Crisp, New York, NY (eliminated after the appetizer); Lucas Manteca, Chef/Restaurateur, Sea Salt and Quahog's Restaurants, Stone Harbor, NJ (eliminated after the entrée); Robert Burmeister, Executive Chef and Co-Owner, Chow Gourmet Kitchen, Staten Island, NY (eliminated after the dessert); Chris Coleman, Private Executive Chef, Long Island, NY (winner)
7	7	"Quail, Arctic Char, Beer"	Scott Conant, Alex Guarnaschelli, and Amanda Freitag	February 24, 2009
Ingredients: Appetizer: endive, frozen peas, quail, red seedless grapes; Entrée: watercress, tamarind paste, creamed corn, Arctic char; Dessert: pitted dates, frozen pie crust, caramel candy, stout beer; Contestants: Melinda Dorn, Sous chef and Instructor, New York, NY (eliminated after the appetizer); Ralph Battista Jr., Executive Chef, Butterfield 8, New York, NY (eliminated after the entrée); Lior Lev Sercarz, Chef and Entrepreneur, La Boîte à Biscuits and La Boîte à Epices, New York, NY (eliminated after the dessert); Abe Lopez, Chef de cuisine, Pacifico, Center Valley, PA (winner); Notes: In the appetizer round Chef Dorn did not get her quail on one plate. As a result, she was eliminated.
8	8	"Coconut, Calamari, Donuts"	Aarón Sánchez, Alex Guarnaschelli, and Chris Santos	March 3, 2009
Ingredients: Appetizer: turbot, nori sheets, pistachios, coconut; Entrée: rainbow chard, papaya, granola, parsnips, calamari; Dessert: plain donuts, smoked gouda, white chocolate, dried apricots; Contestants: Gwen LePape, Executive Chef, Frederick's Restaurant, New York, NY (eliminated after the appetizer); Francesco Peluso, Executive Chef, Peluso's Italian Specialties, Clifton, NJ (eliminated after the entrée); Dave Ogren, Executive Chef, Almos Restaurant, New York, NY (eliminated after the dessert); Mina Newman, Executive Chef, Christos Steakhouse, Astoria, NY (winner); Notes: In the appetizer round, Chef LePape failed to get any food onto his plates. The judges allowed him to bring the pan from the oven to the tasting table after the other competitors offered their permission. Despite this, Chef LePape was eliminated.
9	9	"Mac & Cheese, Cola, Bacon"	Chris Santos, Amanda Freitag, and Marc Murphy	March 10, 2009
Ingredients: Appetizer: boxed macaroni and cheese, artichokes, tilapia; Entrée: eggplant, ground pork, poblano chiles, avocados, cola; Dessert: oranges, grapefruit, semi-sweet chocolate chips, bacon; Contestants: David Goldwhite, Private Personal Chef, New York, NY (eliminated after the appetizer); Gypsy Gifford, Executive Chef, Cafe Pinot, Los Angeles, CA (eliminated after the entrée); William Lustberg, Sous chef / saucier, Waldorf-Astoria Hotel, New York, NY (eliminated after the dessert); James Briscione, Chef Instructor, Institute of Culinary Education, New York, NY (winner)
10	10	"String Cheese, Jicama, Gingersnaps"	Scott Conant, Amanda Freitag, and Geoffrey Zakarian	March 17, 2009
Ingredients: Appetizer: chicken wings, soba noodles, celery, string cheese; Entrée: striped bass, pimento peppers, jicama, mangoes, brie cheese; Dessert: ginger snaps, crème fraîche, instant coffee, carrots; Contestants: Jonathan Jernigan, Executive Chef, Catering by Jonathan, Willingboro, NJ (eliminated after the appetizer); King Phojanakong, Executive Chef, Kuma Inn, New York, NY (eliminated after the entrée); Soulayphet Schwader, Executive Chef, Talay Restaurant, New York, NY (eliminated after the dessert); Darius Peacock, Executive Chef, Exceptional Taste Catering, Trenton, NJ (winner); Notes: This is the first episode to feature four male chefs.
11	11	"Jumbo Shrimp, Pepperoncini, Cereal"	Geoffrey Zakarian, Alex Guarnaschelli, and Amanda Freitag	March 24, 2009
Ingredients: Appetizer: peanut butter, Granny Smith apples, jumbo shrimp; Entrée: kielbasa, pepperoncini, fingerling potatoes, tarragon; Dessert: marshmallow spread, chocolate puff cereal, semi-sweet chocolate chips, dried strawberries; Contestants: Alina Eisenhauer, Pastry Chef, Sweet, Woodstock, CT (eliminated after the appetizer); Todd Miller, Executive Chef, STK, New York, NY (eliminated after the entrée); Michael Giletto, Executive Chef, Cherry Valley Country Club, Skillman, NJ (eliminated after the dessert); Jackie Lee, Private Chef, New York, NY (winner)
12	12	"Chocolate, Mussels and Figs"	Aarón Sánchez, Alex Guarnaschelli, and Geoffrey Zakarian	March 31, 2009
Ingredients: Appetizer: beef tenderloin, cucumber, Asian pears, bittersweet chocolate; Entrée: mussels, canned tomatoes, pita bread, celery root; Dessert: black mission figs, slivered almonds, lemons; Contestants: Michael Selicious, Executive Chef, Wickets Inn, Onset, MA (eliminated after the appetizer); Nigel Spence, Owner and Executive Chef, Ripe Kitchen and Bar, Mt. Vernon, NY (eliminated after the entrée); Melissa Levy, Executive Chef, IBM, Newburgh, NY (eliminated after the dessert); Gavin Mills, Executive Chef, Broadway East, New York, NY (winner)
13	13	"Strawberries, Turkey and Gummi Bears"	Scott Conant, Amanda Freitag, and Aarón Sánchez	April 7, 2009
Ingredients: Appetizer: salmon, radicchio, ginger, strawberries; Entrée: turkey breast, baby turnips, pearl onions, coconut flakes; Dessert: blackberries, kiwi, wonton wrappers, gummy bears; Contestants: Victor Cabezas, Chef and Owner, Misaví, Totowa, NJ (eliminated after the appetizer); Jonathan Contes, Chef and Part Owner, Eat Mosaic, St. James, Long Island, NY (eliminated after the entrée); Amy Roth, Chef and Owner, Amy Kate Catering, New York, NY (eliminated after the dessert); Michael Carrino, Chef and Owner, Restaurant Passionné, Montclair, NJ (winner)

=== Season 2 (2009) ===
No. overall	No. in season	Title	Judges	Original release date
14	1	"A Prickly Situation"	Aarón Sánchez, Alex Guarnaschelli, and Chris Santos	June 14, 2009
Ingredients: Appetizer: brioche, fennel, sea urchin; Entrée: blackstrap molasses, red snapper, parsley root, dried cranberries; Dessert: bulgur wheat, pomegranate juice, pineapple, green papaya; Contestants: Peter Klein, Executive Chef and Part Owner, Chow Bar, New York, NY (eliminated after the appetizer); Ross Gill, Executive Chef and General Manager, Home Restaurant, New York, NY (eliminated after the entrée); Yvan Lemoine, Chef, New York, NY (eliminated after the dessert); Natalia Machado, Junior Executive Chef, Industria Argentina, New York, NY (winner); Notes: The judges caught Chef Lemoine plating past time limits. As a result, the judges eliminated him.
15	2	"Salty Veggies & Heated Battles"	Chris Santos, Alex Guarnaschelli, and Marc Murphy	June 16, 2009
Ingredients: Appetizer: sea beans, ginger ale, pork tenderloin; Entrée: baby artichokes, cashew butter, monkfish, Thai chiles; Dessert: jicama, pepitas, blueberries; Contestants: Fritz Knipschildt, Chef and Chocolatier, Knipschildt Chocolatier, Norwalk, CT (eliminated after the appetizer); Cheryl Perry, Chef and Culinary Instructor, New York, NY (eliminated after the entrée); David Rotter, Executive Chef, Campo, New York, NY (eliminated after the dessert); Jason Zukas, Chef Consultant, Bocca Fina, Queens, NY (winner); Notes: Chef Perry dropped her tongs on the floor in Round 1 and continued cooking, but moved on because Chef Knipschildt made an undrinkable Bloody Mary. In the entree round, Chef Perry was caught double-dipping but was chopped for serving raw artichokes.
16	3	"High Hopes"	Scott Conant, Amanda Freitag, and Marc Murphy	June 23, 2009
Ingredients: Appetizer: calamari, Brussels sprouts, Asian pears; Entrée: bison, dried mango, leeks, Belgian-style ale; Dessert: ancho chiles, semi-sweet chocolate, black plums; Contestants: Nicole Puzio, Executive Chef, Ox Restaurant, Jersey City, NJ (eliminated after the appetizer); David Kirschner, Sous chef, W Hotel, Hoboken, NJ (eliminated after the entrée); Michael Ferraro, Executive Chef, Delicatessen, New York, NY (eliminated after the dessert); John Lawson, Sous chef, Gordon Ramsay at The London, New York, NY (winner); Notes: Chef Puzio did not finish her plates in Round 1 resulting in her elimination. The judges also were very disappointed in every first course. The bison in the second basket was a thick-cut sirloin steak.
17	4	"Floundering Around"	Scott Conant, Amanda Freitag, and Aarón Sánchez	June 30, 2009
Ingredients: Appetizer: beef shoulder, fish sauce, canned pumpkin; Entrée: flounder, yellow plantains, baby bok choy, mini watermelon; Dessert: tomatillos, crème fraîche, plain donuts; Contestants: Massimo Felici, Executive Chef, Ristorante DeGrezia, New York, NY (eliminated after the appetizer); Christine Campbell, Butcher and Private Chef, Long Island, NY (eliminated after the entrée); Julio Lazzarini, Executive Chef and Owner, Orillas Tapas Bar and Restaurant, Wilmington, DE (eliminated after the dessert); Marc Spooner, Production Chef, Great Performances Catering, New York, NY (winner)
18	5	"Pride on the Plate"	Chris Santos, Alex Guarnaschelli, and Marc Murphy	July 7, 2009
Ingredients: Appetizer: duck breast, polenta, sharon fruit; Entrée: rainbow trout, baby turnips, tamarind concentrate, serrano ham; Dessert: sliced almonds, Okinawan sweet potatoes, brioche, sambuca; Contestants: Shaya Klechevsky, Personal Chef and Instructor, At Your Palate, New York, NY (eliminated after the appetizer); Pasquale Frola, Executive Sous Chef, Naples 45, New York, NY (eliminated after the entrée); Giuliano Matarese, Executive Chef, Arte Café, New York, NY (eliminated after the dessert); Roshni Mansukhani, Executive Sous Chef and Private Chef, Boston, MA (winner); Notes: Throughout each course, Chef Giuliano failed to complete any of his dishes. Chef Roshni would go on to appear in Season 10 of Hell's Kitchen, finishing in 12th place.
19	6	"Pretty Please with a Pepper on Top"	Geoffrey Zakarian, Alex Guarnaschelli, and Chris Santos	July 14, 2009
Ingredients: Appetizer: ground turkey, piquillo peppers, gooseberries; Entrée: top round of lamb, coconut flakes, snap peas, quick grits; Dessert: celery, blood oranges, frozen pie crust, jaggery; Contestants: Barbara Sibley, Executive Chef and Owner, La Palapa Cocina Mexicana, New York, NY (eliminated after the appetizer); Christopher Nguyen, Chef Consultant, Keo Asian Restaurant, York, PA (eliminated after the entrée); Paul Viggiano, Chef de cuisine, Docs Steakhouse, Sparta, NJ (eliminated after the dessert); Tyler Anderson, Executive Chef, The Copper Beech Inn, Essex, CT (winner)
20	7	"Pods, Grills and Sticky Fingers"	Scott Conant, Amanda Freitag, and Geoffrey Zakarian	July 28, 2009
Ingredients: Appetizer: jumbo shrimp, edamame, golden raisins; Entrée: flank steak, grape juice, goat cheese, lemongrass; Dessert: coffee liqueur, avocados, boiled ginkgo nuts, honeycomb; Contestants: Moha Orchid, Private Chef, New York, NY (eliminated after the appetizer); Maristella Innocenti, Owner and Chef, Matilda, New York, NY (eliminated after the entrée); Matthew Zappoli, Owner and Executive Chef, Tre Amici, Long Branch, NJ (eliminated after the dessert); Joe Bayley, Sous chef, Cobblestone Foods, New York, NY (winner); Notes: Chef Orchid was eliminated in the appetizer round for only getting shrimp on one plate (that wasn't even cooked) and forgetting to plate the raisins.
21	8	"A Wish Upon A Starfruit"	Aarón Sánchez, Alex Guarnaschelli, and Marc Murphy	August 11, 2009
Ingredients: Appetizer: red currant jam, merguez sausage, broccoli; Entrée: chicken breast, dandelion greens, starfruit, cherry liqueur; Dessert: grape leaves, sesame seeds, honeydew melon, pickled ginger; Contestants: Ming Lu, Line Cook, Le Cirque, New York, NY (eliminated after the appetizer); Pedro Diáz, Sous chef, Fresh Direct, New York, NY (eliminated after the entrée); Lisa Schoen, Executive Chef and Food Stylist, Mad River Post and In Your Kitchen, New York, NY (eliminated after the dessert); Cody Utzman, Chef and Restaurateur, Brooklyn Standard, New York, NY (winner)
22	9	"Buckwheat Blunders and Twists of Fate"	Chris Santos, Alex Guarnaschelli, and Aarón Sánchez	August 25, 2009
Ingredients: Appetizer: olive oil-packed tuna, English cucumbers, buckwheat flour; Entrée: knockwurst, pretzels, ramps, mangosteen; Dessert: biscuit dough, pistachios, dried hibiscus flowers, black olives; Contestants: Simon Lange, Chef and Restaurateur, Apartment 138, Brooklyn, NY (eliminated after the appetizer); Rory O'Farrell, Executive Chef, Ayza Wine & Chocolate Bar, New York, NY (eliminated after the entrée); Mor Amitzur, Executive Chef, The View at the Marriott Marquis, New York, NY (eliminated after the dessert); Diane DiMeo, Private Chef, Red Box Bistro, New York, NY (winner); Notes: Chef Amitzur cut himself in Round 1 and continued making his dish with no gloves, or band-aid however the producer made him throw his dish away forcing him to redo his dish.
23	10	"Chopped Champions Event, Round One: The Ultimate Face-off"	Geoffrey Zakarian, Alex Guarnaschelli, and Marc Murphy	September 8, 2009
Ingredients: Appetizer: crayfish, red seedless grapes, fiddlehead ferns; Entrée: quail, guava nectar, udon noodles, dinosaur kale; Dessert: baby kiwi, Israeli couscous, rice paper, saffron; Contestants: Michael Carrino, Chef and Owner, Restaurant Passionné, Montclair, NJ (Episode 1.13 – "Strawberries, Turkey and Gummi Bears") (eliminated after the appetizer); Sandy Davis, Catering Chef, Union Theological Seminary, New York, NY (Episode 1.1 – "Octopus, Duck, Animal Crackers") (eliminated after the entrée); Natalia Machado, Junior Executive Chef, Industria Argentina, New York, NY (Episode 2.6 – "A Prickly Situation") (eliminated after the dessert); James Briscione, Chef Instructor, Institute of Culinary Education, New York, NY (Episode 1.9 – "Mac & Cheese, Cola, Bacon") (advances to next episode) (winner); Notes: This is the first "Chopped Champions" event, featuring winners of past episodes. There were four loosely connected parts, wherein the winner of this episode got $10,000 and the chance to compete in the next special episode against three new past champions, potentially winning up to $40,000 with each round they get through.
24	11	"Chopped Champions Event, Round Two: Best of the Best"	Scott Conant, Jody Williams, and Aarón Sánchez	September 15, 2009
Ingredients: Appetizer: cockles, kohlrabi, pita bread; Entrée: ground chicken, green tea leaves, mustard oil, braeburn apples; Dessert: chocolate wafers, manchego cheese, passionfruit, goji berries; Contestants: Pippa Calland, Owner and Chef, Chef for Hire LLC, Newville, Pennsylvania (Episode 1.2 – "Tofu, Blueberries, Oysters") (eliminated after the appetizer); Gavin Mills, Executive Chef, Broadway East, New York, NY (Episode 1.12 – "Chocolate, Mussels and Figs") (eliminated after the entrée); James Briscione (returning champion) (eliminated after the dessert); Einat Admony, Chef and Owner, Taïm, New York, NY (Episode 1.4 – "Banana, Collard Greens, Grits") (advances to next episode) (winner); Notes: Three new Chopped champions competed against the winner of the Chopped Champions Event, Round One. The winner of this episode won $10,000 and the chance to compete in the next episode against three different past champions. The previous winner lost in the dessert basket, meaning a new chef earned the chance to potentially add more money to their winnings in the next special episode (up to $30,000).
25	12	"Chopped Champions Event, Round Three: All-Stars Showdown"	Chris Santos, Geoffrey Zakarian, and Marc Murphy	September 22, 2009
Ingredients: Appetizer: lavash bread, preserved lemons, squab; Entrée: bluefish, papaya, ginger snaps, beef jerky; Dessert: butter crackers, grapefruit, feta cheese, gin; Contestants: Jackie Lee, Private Chef, New York, NY (Episode 1.11 – "Jumbo Shrimp, Pepperoni, Cereal") (eliminated after the appetizer); Einat Admony (returning champion) (eliminated after the entrée); Andre Marrero, Chef tournant, L’Atelier de Joël Robuchon, New York, NY (Episode 1.3 – "Avocado, Tahini, Bran Flakes") (eliminated after the dessert); Cody Utzman, Chef and Restaurateur, Brooklyn Standard, New York, NY (Episode 2.8 – "A Wish Upon a Starfruit") (advances to next episode) (winner); Notes: Three new Chopped champions competed against the winner of the Chopped Champions Event, Round Two. The winner of this episode won $10,000 and the chance to compete in the next episode against three different past champions. Once again, the previous winner was knocked out (in the entrée basket) so a new chef earned the chance to potentially add more money to their winnings in the next special episode (up to $20,000).
26	13	"Chopped Champions Event, Round Four: Bring It!"	Scott Conant, Alex Guarnaschelli, and Aarón Sánchez	September 29, 2009
Ingredients: Appetizer: lobster, bananas, endive; Entrée: pork loin, watercress, galia melon, taro root; Dessert: matzo, pomegranate molasses, roasted chestnuts, baby fennel; Contestants: Cody Utzman (returning champion) (eliminated after the appetizer); Diane DiMeo, Private Chef, Red Box Bistro, New York, NY (Episode 2.9 – "Buckwheat Blunders and Twists of Fate") (eliminated after the entrée); John Lawson, Sous chef, Gordon Ramsay at The London, New York, NY (Episode 2.2 – "High Hopes") (eliminated after the dessert); Darius Peacock, Executive Chef, Exceptional Taste Catering, Trenton, NJ (Episode 1.10 – "String Cheese, Jicama, Gingersnaps") (winner); Notes: This is the last of the special Chopped Champion Event episodes. Three Chopped champions competed against the winner of the Chopped Champions Event, Round Three. A new champion dethroned the previous winner in the appetizer round meaning none of the winners in all four episodes won more than one episode. The winner of this episode won $10,000.

=== Season 3 (2009–10) ===
No. overall	No. in season	Title	Judges	Original release date
27	1	"When Chefs Collide"	Geoffrey Zakarian, Scott Conant, and Aarón Sánchez	October 13, 2009
Ingredients: Appetizer: Manila clams, kumquats, croissants; Entrée: ground pork, camembert, sweet vermouth, haricots verts; Dessert: carrots, goat cheese, quick grits, pomelo; Contestants: Peter Giannakas, Chef and Restaurateur, Ovelia Psistaria Bar, New York, NY (eliminated after the appetizer); Angie Shaghaghi, Chef Instructor, Creative Cooks, New York, NY (eliminated after the entrée); Cisse Elhadji, Chef and Restaurateur, Ponty Bistro, New York, NY (eliminated after the dessert); Dean Yasharian, Executive Sous Chef, Bar Boulud, New York, NY (winner)
28	2	"Oh My Goshy, Umeboshi"	Aarón Sánchez, Jody Williams, and Geoffrey Zakarian	October 20, 2009
Ingredients: Appetizer: peas, peaches, eel; Entrée: shrimp, oatmeal, butternut squash, umeboshi; Dessert: parsnips, limoncello, soda crackers, sharp cheddar cheese; Contestants: Jeffrey Baruch, Executive Chef, London Lennie's Seafood Restaurant, New York, NY (eliminated after the appetizer); Barbara Esmonde, Executive Chef, Mediterranean Catering, Wynnewood, PA (eliminated after the entrée); Peter Karapanagiotis, Executive Chef, Privé Mediterranean Restaurant, Philadelphia, PA (eliminated after the dessert); Jeremy Duclut, Executive Chef, Georges' Bar and Restaurant, Wayne, PA (winner); Notes: Chef Esmonde cut herself during the entrée round. After attempting to put on a glove that did not fit, she took it off and tossed her salad with her hands despite her open wound. As a result, the judges did not eat the salad and chopped her for her poor sanitation.
29	3	"Judge Knows Best"	Chris Santos, Scott Conant, and Marc Murphy	October 27, 2009
Ingredients: Appetizer: hamachi, quail eggs, dried cherries; Entrée: beef tenderloin, mango, gruyère cheese, kochujang; Dessert: ripened plantains, prosecco, crystallized ginger, bacon; Contestants: Fabian Ludwig, Executive Chef, Gramercy Park Hotel, New York, NY (eliminated after the appetizer); Ayesha Nurdjaja, Executive Chef, Il Bordello, New York, NY (eliminated after the entrée); Joshua Whigham, Sous chef, Jack's Luxury Oyster Bar, New York, NY (eliminated after the dessert); Joe Dobias, Chef and Restaurateur, Joe Doe Restaurant, New York, NY (winner); Notes: Chef Dobias did not get his plantain cake on the plate in the dessert round despite getting all four ingredients on the plate. The judges offered him the opportunity to bring up his cakes. However, his competitor had to give his consent and refused. Despite this Chef Dobias won.
30	4	"A Nori Story"	Josh Capon, Alex Guarnaschelli, and Geoffrey Zakarian	November 3, 2009
Ingredients: Appetizer: beef tenderloin, nori, maple syrup; Entrée: broccoli rabe, crystallized ginger, five year aged gouda, mahi-mahi; Dessert: cherries, pumpernickel bread, curry powder, yuzu juice; Contestants: Adele DiBiase, Chef and Restaurateur, Bona Vita Osteria, Summit, NJ (eliminated after the appetizer); Malik Fall, Chef and Restaurateur, Boucarou Lounge, New York, NY (eliminated after the entrée); Michael Bicocchi, Executive Chef, Flex Mussels, New York, NY (eliminated after the dessert); PJ Calapa, Sous chef, Nobu Fifty Seven, New York, NY (winner)
31	5	"Sticking To It"	Geoffrey Zakarian, Alex Guarnaschelli, and Chris Santos	November 10, 2009
Ingredients: Appetizer: turkey breast, Kirby cucumbers, graham crackers; Entrée: black cod, puffed rice cereal, pineapple, chorizo; Dessert: mangoes, puff pastry, coffee beans, rose water; Contestants: Melinda Beaulieu, Private Chef and Nutritionist, New York, NY (eliminated after the appetizer); David Amorelli, Executive Chef, Coffee Shop, New York, NY (eliminated after the entrée); Dominick Feragola, Sous chef, Broadway East, New York, NY (eliminated after the dessert); Luisa Fernandes, Executive Chef, Georgia's Cafe and Bakery, New York, NY (winner)
32	6	"Season's Choppings"	Scott Conant, Alex Guarnaschelli, and Aarón Sánchez	December 8, 2009
Ingredients: Appetizer: venison tenderloin, quince, eggnog; Entrée: kale, rutabaga, marshmallows, turkey; Dessert: garnet yams, brie, sparkling wine, cranberries; Contestants: Megan Fells, Chef and Restaurateur, The Artist's Palate, Poughkeepsie, NY (eliminated after the appetizer); Jason Tilmann, Executive Chef, NYY Steak, New York, NY (eliminated after the entrée); Keith Geter, Chef, Artisanal, New York, NY (eliminated after the dessert); Jon Bignelli, Sous chef, wd~50, New York, NY (winner); Notes: In the appetizer round Chef Bignelli made a puree after Chef Tilmann made one, and Chef Bignelli did not clean out the blender. Chef Tilmann wanted Chef Bignelli to be disqualified however the judges decided that Chef Bignelli's puree tasted different enough to avoid disqualification. The chefs were given 45 minutes in the entrée round rather than the normal 30 to allow time to properly cook the turkey.
33	7	"Flower Power"	Geoffrey Zakarian, Sue Torres, and Marc Murphy	March 14, 2010
Ingredients: Appetizer: chicken breast, kiwi, zucchini blossoms; Entrée: scallops, cranberry juice, artichokes, burdock root; Dessert: blackberries, apple cider, shredded phyllo dough, fresh chickpeas; Contestants: Bill Feldman, Chef and Entrepreneur, New York, NY (eliminated after the appetizer); Keith Jodway, Consulting Chef, New York, NY (eliminated after the entrée); Lola Garand, Consulting Chef, New York, NY (eliminated after the dessert); Tommy Lee, Executive Chef, Battery Gardens, New York, NY (winner); Notes: Chef Jodway left kiwi out of some of the dishes he plated in the appetizer round and forgot a cranberry vinaigrette off of all his entrées; both mistakes were due to time constraints.
34	8	"Sweet Redemption"	Aarón Sánchez, Scott Conant, and Marc Murphy	March 21, 2010
Ingredients: Appetizer: littleneck clams, Yukon Gold potatoes, rhubarb; Entrée: striped bass, corn tortillas, applesauce, okra; Dessert: carrot juice, white chocolate chips, baby beets, hominy; Contestants: Michael Giletto, Executive Chef, Cherry Valley Country Club, Skillman, NJ (Episode 1.12 – "Jumbo Shrimp, Pepperoni, Cereal") (eliminated after the appetizer); Katie Rosenhouse, Pastry Chef, Olana Restaurant, New York, NY (Episode 1.1 – "Octopus, Duck, Animal Crackers") (eliminated after the entrée); Chris Burke, Private Chef, New York, NY (Episode 1.3 – "Avocado, Tahini, Bran Flakes") (eliminated after the dessert); Amy Roth, Chef and Owner, Amy Kate Catering, New York, NY (Episode 1.13 – "Strawberries, Turkey and Gummi Bears") (winner); Notes: This was the first episode to feature four past runners-up competing for a chance to redeem themselves and win.
35	9	"Winging It"	Geoffrey Zakarian, Sue Torres, and Chris Santos	March 28, 2010
Ingredients: Appetizer: sake, green seedless grapes, chicken wings; Entrée: horseradish, catfish, treviso, Japanese eggplant; Dessert: cherry tomatoes, silken tofu, ginger snaps, cocoa nibs; Contestants: Linda Laestadius, Pastry Chef, The Bear Cafe, Woodstock, NY (eliminated after the appetizer); Lizzie Singh-Brar, Executive Chef, Fanny, Brooklyn, NY (eliminated after the entrée); John Sierp, Executive Chef, White Cloud Catering, New York, NY (eliminated after the dessert); Justin Gaines, Executive Sous chef, Zanaro's Italian Restaurant, White Plains, NY (winner)
36	10	"In A Pinch"	Scott Conant, Alex Guarnaschelli, and Marc Murphy	April 5, 2010
Ingredients: Appetizer: red cherry peppers, mortadella, soft shell crabs; Entrée: baby bananas, black-eyed peas, poblano chiles, ostrich steak; Dessert: lychees, phyllo dough, Canadian bacon, candy canes; Contestants: Damien Brassel, Executive Chef, Knife + Fork, New York, NY (eliminated after the appetizer); Lonnie Dyner, Executive Chef, Le Petit Marché, New York, NY (eliminated after the entrée); Susan Crocker, Catering Chef, Holberts Catering and Backyard Bistro, Montgomery, NY (eliminated after the dessert); Pnina Peled, Chef de cuisine, The New York Helmsley Hotel, New York, NY (winner); Notes: This was the first episode where two female chefs faced each other in the final round.
37	11	"Raw Enthusiasm"	Scott Conant, Alex Guarnaschelli, and Aarón Sánchez	April 12, 2010
Ingredients: Appetizer: apricots, macadamia nuts, oysters; Entrée: cucumber, buttermilk, pork loin, canned jackfruit; Dessert: sugar cookie dough, bittersweet chocolate, figs, yellow miso paste; Contestants: Mark Twersky, Culinary Instructor, The French Culinary Institute, New York, NY (eliminated after the appetizer); Deborah Gorman, Catering Chef, The Good Knife, New York, NY (eliminated after the entrée); Arvin Dhansew, Catering Chef, Relish Caterers, New York, NY (eliminated after the dessert); Martin Brock, Executive Chef, Atria, New York, NY (winner)
38	12	"Against the Tide"	Mark Bittman, Amanda Freitag, and Aarón Sánchez	April 19, 2010
Ingredients: Appetizer: habanero chiles, bittersweet chocolate, fresh sardines; Entrée: strawberries, celery root, lamb loin chops, Swiss cheese; Dessert: corn tortillas, dried chipotle peppers, blueberries, violet mustard; Contestants: Michael Madigan, Chef and Restaurateur, Snails and Quails / Farm 2 Bistro, New York, NY / Nutley, NJ (eliminated after the appetizer); Andres Barrera, Executive Chef, City Winery, New York, NY (eliminated after the entrée); Laurielle Clark, Private Chef, New York, NY (eliminated after the dessert); Erik Weatherspool, Chef and Restaurateur, Bistro 44, Toms River, NJ (winner); Notes: This was the first episode to feature an ingredient, violet mustard, that the judges were not familiar with.
39	13	"Chopped Liver"	Scott Conant, Alex Guarnaschelli, and Chris Santos	May 2, 2010
Ingredients: Appetizer: raspberries, asparagus, chicken livers; Entrée: arugula, pickled daikon, fresh pasta, mackerel; Dessert: Greek yogurt, sugar cane, cactus pears, popcorn kernels; Contestants: John-Michael Hamlet, Chef and Restaurateur, John-Michael's Restaurant, North Salem, NY (eliminated after the appetizer); Hannah Hopkins, Chef and Restaurateur, Dish, Mahopac, NY (eliminated after the entrée); Bradley Boyle, Chef and Restaurateur, Salt Gastro Pub, Byram, NJ (eliminated after the dessert); Marc Pavlovic, Culinary Instructor, The French Culinary Institute, New York, NY (winner)

=== Season 4 (2010) ===
- Starting in this season, four ingredients in every basket became the standard instead of the occasional round with three or five ingredients as in the previous three seasons.

No. overall	No. in season	Title	Judges	Original release date
40	1	"Rattle & Roll"	Chris Santos, Alex Guarnaschelli, and Geoffrey Zakarian	April 6, 2010
Ingredients: Appetizer: Asian pears, croissants, haricots verts, rattlesnake meat; Entrée: tapioca pearls, carrots, fruit leather, rabbit; Dessert: yucca, calimyrna figs, hoisin sauce, red jalapeños; Contestants: Siggy Sollitto, Chef and Restaurateur, Siggy's Good Food, Brooklyn Heights, NY (eliminated after the appetizer); Eric Paraskevas, Executive Chef, Terra Restaurant, Philadelphia, PA (eliminated after the entrée); Chris Coombs, Executive Chef, Dbar, Boston, MA (eliminated after the dessert); Mackenzie Hilton, Executive Chef, Mercato Restaurant, Philadelphia, PA (winner); Notes: Chef Sollitto only managed to make one plate in the first round resulting in her elimination.
41	2	"My Froggy Clementine"	Scott Conant, Amanda Freitag, and Aarón Sánchez	April 13, 2010
Ingredients: Appetizer: bourbon whiskey, anchovies, dates, frog legs; Entrée: hamachi, beets, tortilla chips, Malta; Dessert: clementine oranges, scotch whiskey, basil, toasted oats cereal; Contestants: Sunshine Best, Special Diets Chef, Your Safe Kitchen, New York, NY (eliminated after the appetizer); Warren Schierenbeck, Chef and Restaurateur, DoSi Cafe, Staten Island, NY (eliminated after the entrée); Erica Wides, Chef Instructor, Institute of Culinary Education, New York, NY (eliminated after the dessert); Mario Tolentino, Private Chef, Can Cook Personal Chef Services, New York, NY (winner)
42	3	"Jitters & Giant Eggs"	Scott Conant, Jody Williams, and Marc Murphy	April 20, 2010
Ingredients: Appetizer: ground turkey, black garlic, raspberries, pickled watermelon rind; Entrée: fresh horseradish, goat chops, oatmeal, snap peas; Dessert: canned peaches, cherry tomatoes, pretzel sticks, emu eggs; Contestants: Rory MacDonald, Head Pastry Chef, Tocqueville, New York, NY (eliminated after the appetizer); Brian Kevorkian, Line Cook, New York, NY (eliminated after the entrée); Maurice "Mo" Hurley, Executive Chef, Valbella, New York, NY (eliminated after the dessert); Jessica Mogardo, Pastry Chef, New York, NY (winner)
43	4	"Dr. Deckle & Mr. Fried"	Scott Conant, Amanda Freitag, and Aarón Sánchez	April 27, 2010
Ingredients: Appetizer: collard greens, jumbo shrimp, corn chips, olive loaf; Entrée: broccoli rabe, deckle of beef, hibiscus flowers in syrup, black-eyed peas; Dessert: avocadoes, oyster sauce, tofu skins, star fruit; Contestants: Abigail Hitchcock, Chef and Restaurateur, Camaje Bistro, New York, NY (eliminated after the appetizer); Shanna Pacifico, Chef de cuisine, Back Forty, New York, NY (eliminated after the entrée); John P. Greco III, Chef and Restaurateur, Philip Marie, New York, NY (eliminated after the dessert); Michael Siry, Corporate Executive Chef, Big Daddy's Diner, Duke's, and City Crab, New York, NY (winner); Notes: Later reruns of this episode were dedicated to the memory of Michael Siry who died of cancer in June 2013. Chef Hitchcock forgot an ingredient (corn chips) in the appetizer round. As a result, she was chopped.
44	5	"Mussels Mastery & Cotton Candy Can-Do"	Marcus Samuelsson, Alex Guarnaschelli, and Aarón Sánchez	May 4, 2010
Ingredients: Appetizer: mussels, asparagus, cactus pear, kidney beans; Entrée: sharp cheddar cheese, watermelon radish, squab, frozen waffles; Dessert: saltine crackers, green papaya, dried mangoes, cotton candy; Contestants: Sean Mell, Omakase Chef, Nobu, New York, NY (eliminated after the appetizer); Berthsy Ayide, Chef and Caterer, The Kitchen Sink, New York, NY (eliminated after the entrée); Jeremy Hanlon, Private Chef, My Fresh Chef, Lantana, FL (eliminated after the dessert); Christian Petroni, Chef and Restaurateur, Barcelona, Greenwich, CT (winner); Notes: This is Marcus Samuelsson's first episode as a judge.
45	6	"First Things Worst"	Scott Conant, Alex Guarnaschelli, and Aarón Sánchez	May 11, 2010
Ingredients: Appetizer: gooseberries, Darjeeling tea, ricotta salata, calf's liver; Entrée: cuttlefish, long beans, sweet piquanté peppers, bittersweet chocolate; Dessert: baby bananas, coconut flakes, pumpernickel rye, soy sauce; Contestants: Nadege Fleurimond, Caterer, Fleurimond Catering, New York, NY (eliminated after the appetizer); Paul Ripley, Food and Beverage Manager, Raritan Valley Country Club, Bridgewater, NJ (eliminated after the entrée); Ryan DePersio, Chef and Restaurateur, Fascino, Montclair, NJ (eliminated after the dessert); Rebecca Weitzman, Chef de cuisine, Inoteca, New York, NY (winner); Notes: Nadege was caught plating past limits in Round 1. As a result, she was chopped. Rebecca forgot three ingredients on one plate in the appetizer round but moved on based on how good her dish was.
46	7	"Fired Up!"	Chris Santos, Amanda Freitag, and Aarón Sánchez	June 1, 2010
Ingredients: Appetizer: striped sea bass, strawberries, baby fennel, marshmallows; Entrée: country pork ribs, kale, butternut squash, popcorn on the cob; Dessert: polenta, lambic beer, pineapple, hot dogs; Contestants: Mary Beth Johnson, Executive Chef, Maritime, New York, NY (eliminated after the appetizer); Kristen Davis, Personal Chef, Long Island, NY (eliminated after the entrée); Adam Goldgell, Chef, Sugo Café, Long Beach, NY (eliminated after the dessert); Michael Jenkins, Chef, Butter, New York, NY (winner); Notes: This was a grilling-themed episode. The stovetops were outfitted with grill sheets and the ovens were off-limits. Chef Jenkins is a chef at Butter, which is co-owned by regular Chopped judge, Alex Guarnaschelli.
47	8	"Quahog Quandaries and Pickle Puzzles"	Amanda Freitag, Alex Guarnaschelli, and Jody Williams	June 8, 2010
Ingredients: Appetizer: quahog clams, rhubarb, almond butter cookies; Entrée: venison tenderloin, cinnamon swirl bread, sharon fruit, cornichons; Dessert: matzo, salty peanuts, dried strawberries, cocoa nibs; Contestants: Melissa Muller, Executive Chef, Organika, New York, NY (eliminated after the appetizer); Ricardo Cardona, Executive Chef, Sofrito, New York, NY (eliminated after the entrée); Kat Ploszaj, Executive Chef, Petit Oven, Brooklyn, NY (eliminated after the dessert); Marc Anthony Bynum, Executive Chef, Venúe 56, Hauppauge, NY (winner); Notes: This was the first episode to feature an all-female panel of judges. During the appetizer Chef Muller realized with a minute left she couldn't finish and gave up. The judges had to encourage her to finish her dish. She ended up failing to get her cookies on the plate and only one judge got a clam.
48	9	"Turbot Powered"	Scott Conant, Geoffrey Zakarian, and Aarón Sánchez	June 15, 2010
Ingredients: Appetizer: chicken thighs, bitter melon, cream cheese, papadum; Entrée: turbot, wasabi peas, purple cauliflower, satsuma mikan; Dessert: brie, rutabaga, frozen cranberries, English muffins; Contestants: Anthony Locastro, Executive Chef, Downtown Association, New York, NY (eliminated after the appetizer); Mark McMann, Sous chef, Kefi, New York, NY (eliminated after the entrée); Jennifer Meadows, Chef and Restaurateur, Fishbar, Montauk, NY (eliminated after the dessert); Ed Harris, Junior Sous chef, Buddakan, New York, NY (winner)
49	10	"Keep On Cook'n On"	Chris Santos, Amanda Freitag, and Scott Conant	June 22, 2010
Ingredients: Appetizer: serrano ham, fresh pasta, membrillo, half-sour pickles; Entrée: beef tenderloin, taro root, Japanese eggplant, cherry pie filling; Dessert: white bread, unsalted pistachios, buckwheat honey, zucchini; Contestants: Carrie Weiss, Instructor and Writer, New York, NY (eliminated after the appetizer); Sachem "Son" Allison, Executive Chef, SavorNY, New York, NY (eliminated after the entrée); Chris Jaeckle, Sous chef, Morimoto, New York, NY (eliminated after the dessert); Paul "Poppy" Yeaple, Chef and Restaurateur, Poppy's Burgers and Fries, Beacon, NY (winner); Notes: Chef Weiss forget her membrillo in the appetizer resulting in her elimination. Chef Yeaple was the first chef to use the ice cream maker. Chef Yeaple cut his hand in the dessert round but he finished his dish.
50	11	"Green Apps and Lamb"	Chris Santos, Scott Conant, and Marc Murphy	June 29, 2010
Ingredients: Appetizer: Rainier cherries, walnuts, crème de menthe, canned salmon; Entrée: lamb top round, golden raisins, Stilton cheese, edamame; Dessert: buttermilk, braeburn apples, kiwis, amaranth grain; Contestants: Melissa Rebholz, Executive Chef, Garden of Eve Organic Farm, Long Island, NY (eliminated after the appetizer); Adam Sternberg, Executive Chef, 36 Main, New Paltz, NY (eliminated after the entrée); Guillaume Thivet, Executive Chef, Bouley Bakery and Market, New York, NY (eliminated after the dessert); Joshua Stokes, Private Chef, Grill a Chef, New York, NY (winner)
51	12	"Crunch Time"	Scott Conant, Amanda Freitag, and Marc Murphy	July 6, 2010
Ingredients: Appetizer: watermelon, sweet potatoes, knockwurst, almond butter; Entrée: skate, English cucumbers, prunes, shredded wheat crackers; Dessert: oranges, red miso paste, cottage cheese, kettle-cooked potato chips; Contestants: Steven Tempel, Chef and Restaurateur, Logan's Bar and Grill, Speculator, NY (eliminated after the appetizer); Michele Ragussis, Chef and Restaurateur, Stuft Catering / Beast, Brooklyn, NY (eliminated after the entrée); Lance Nitahara, Executive Chef, Camp of the Woods, Speculator, NY (eliminated after the dessert); Madison Cowan, Chef and Caterer, Avenue Inc, New York, NY (winner)
52	13	"Rowdy With a Chance of Meatballs"	Geoffrey Zakarian, Alex Guarnaschelli, and Chris Santos	July 13, 2010
Ingredients: Appetizer: red carrots, Chinese okra, potato knishes, ocean perch; Entrée: ground pork, sorghum molasses, cheese crackers, mustard greens; Dessert: puffed rice cereal, cognac, butterscotch candy, pancetta; Contestants: Jacques Gautier, Executive Chef and Restaurateur, Palo Santo, Park Slope, Brooklyn, NY (eliminated after the appetizer); Deborah Bicknese, Executive Chef and Restaurateur, Beast, Brooklyn, NY (eliminated after the entrée); Jodi Bernhard, Chef de cuisine, Longwood Events, Boston, MA (eliminated after the dessert); Anthony Paris, Executive Chef, Crosby Street Hotel, New York, NY (winner)

=== Season 5 (2010) ===
No. overall	No. in season	Title	Judges	Original release date
53	1	""Dream'n of Redeem'n""	Geoffrey Zakarian, Alex Guarnaschelli, and Marc Murphy	July 20, 2010
Ingredients: Appetizer: rump roast, rainbow chard, vegetable yeast spread; Entrée: branzino, piquillo peppers, jicama, chocolate sandwich cookies; Dessert: vodka, crescent roll dough, sesame seeds, blueberry jelly beans; Contestants: Paul Viggiano, Cooking Instructor (Episode 2.5 – "Pretty Please With a Pepper on Top") (eliminated after the appetizer); Lola Garand, Freelance Consulting Chef, New York, NY (Episode 3.7 – "Flower Power") (eliminated after the entrée); Dominick Feragola, Sous chef, Broadway East, New York, NY (Episode 3.5 – "Sticking To It") (eliminated after the dessert); Matthew Zappoli, Owner and Executive Chef, Tre Amici, Long Branch, NJ (Episode 2.7 – "Pods, Grills and Sticky Fingers") (winner); Notes: This episode featured four past runners-up who returned for a second chance at the $10,000 prize. This is the 1st time since Season 3 that there were three ingredients in a basket. Chef Garand cut herself in Round 1
54	2	"Wok This Way"	Geoffrey Zakarian, Alex Guarnaschelli, and Marc Murphy	July 27, 2010
Ingredients: Appetizer: rainbow trout, Napa cabbage, smoked paprika, white chocolate chips; Entrée: quail, escarole, chocolate-covered raisins, coconut; Dessert: papaya, rice crackers, sake, jura erguel; Contestants: Adam Idris, Private Chef, New York, NY (eliminated after the appetizer); Charlene Johnson, Executive Chef, 202, New York, NY (eliminated after the entrée); Matt Gibson, Sous chef, Spice Market Restaurant, New York, NY (eliminated after the dessert); Ric Orlando, Chef and Restaurateur, New World Home Cooking, Saugerties, NY (winner)
55	3	"Squashed"	Marcus Samuelsson, Alex Guarnaschelli, and Geoffrey Zakarian	August 10, 2010
Ingredients: Appetizer: banana chips, rice paper, kabocha squash, sardines; Entrée: beef shoulder, baby artichokes, blood oranges, cashew butter; Dessert: celery root, cinnamon candies, blackberries, marshmallow spread; Contestants: Jessica Wilson, Sous chef, A Voce Columbus, New York, NY (eliminated after the appetizer); Jasmine Shimoda, Apprenticing Chef, New York, NY (eliminated after the entrée); Yoanne Magris, Chef and Restaurateur, Yo In Yo Out, New York, NY (eliminated after the dessert); Rebecca Newell, Executive Chef, The Beehive, Boston, MA (winner); Notes: This was the first episode to feature four female chefs. Chef Magris forgot banana chips in Round 1 but moved on.
56	4	"$50,000 Tournament: Round One"	Chris Santos, Amanda Freitag, and Marc Murphy	August 31, 2010
Ingredients: Appetizer: tomatillos, horned melon, wonton skins, Rocky Mountain oysters; Entrée: dorade, baby beets, beef jerky, coffee liqueur; Dessert: Yukon Gold potatoes, condensed milk, pomegranates, peanut butter taffy; Contestants: Jessica Mogardo, Executive Pastry Chef, New York, NY (Episode 4.3 – "Jitters & Giant Eggs") (eliminated after the appetizer); Mackenzie Hilton, Executive Chef, Mercato Restaurant, Philadelphia, PA (Episode 4.1 – "Rattle & Roll") (eliminated after the entrée); Paul "Poppy" Yeaple, Chef and Restaurateur, Poppy's Burgers and Fries, Beacon, NY (Episode 4.10 – "Keep On Cook'n On") (eliminated after the dessert); Madison Cowan, Chef and Caterer, Avenue Inc, New York, NY (Episode 4.12 – "Crunch Time") (advances to final round) (winner); Notes: This was the first tournament with four preliminary heats leading up to a finale; it would set the precedent for future Chopped tournaments. This is a five-part series where sixteen past champions competed. The winner of each episode advanced to the finale, where they competed for $50,000.
57	5	"$50,000 Tournament: Round Two"	Geoffrey Zakarian, Amanda Freitag, and Marc Murphy	September 7, 2010
Ingredients: Appetizer: dandelion greens, Greek yogurt, liverwurst, catfish; Entrée: ginger beer, pickled daikon, okra, alligator tenderloin; Dessert: key lime juice, pepitas, halloumi cheese, hot dog buns; Contestants: Michael Jenkins, Line cook, Butter, New York, NY (Episode 4.7 – "Fired Up!") (eliminated after the appetizer); Jon Bignelli, Chef de cuisine, wd~50, New York, NY (Episode 3.6 – "Season's Choppings") (eliminated after the entrée); Pnina Peled, Executive Chef, The New York Helmsley Hotel, New York, NY (Episode 3.10 – "In a Pinch") (eliminated after the dessert); Marc Anthony Bynum, Executive Chef, Venúe 56, Hauppauge, NY (Episode 4.8 – "Quahog Quandaries and Pickle Puzzles") (advances to final round) (winner); Notes: This is part two of a five-part tournament.
58	6	"$50,000 Tournament: Round Three"	Geoffrey Zakarian, Alex Guarnaschelli, and Marc Murphy	September 14, 2010
Ingredients: Appetizer: dried persimmon, phyllo dough, pepper jack cheese, sweetbreads; Entrée: chicken breast, blue corn tortillas, Tuscan kale, sea urchin; Dessert: blueberries, bread & butter pickles, saffron, fruit ring cereal; Contestants: Joe Dobias, Chef and Restaurateur, Joe Doe Restaurant, New York, NY (Episode 3.3 – "Judge Knows Best") (eliminated after the appetizer); Luisa Fernandes, Executive Chef, Georgia's Cafe and Bakery, New York, NY (Episode 3.5 – "Sticking To It") (eliminated after the entrée); Michael Siry, Corporate Executive Chef, Big Daddy's Diner, Duke's, and City Crab, New York, NY (Episode 4.4 – "Dr. Deckle & Mr. Fried") (eliminated after the dessert); Jason Zukas, Executive Chef, New York, NY (Episode 2.1 – "Salty Veggies & Heated Battles") (advances to final round) (winner); Notes: This is part three of a five-part tournament.
59	7	"$50,000 Tournament: Round Four"	Chris Santos, Alex Guarnaschelli, and Marc Murphy	September 21, 2010
Ingredients: Appetizer: cold-smoked kippers, water chestnuts, leeks, lemon-lime soda; Entrée: caperberries, parsley root, chocolate-hazelnut spread, elk tenderloin; Dessert: taco shells, Bosc pears, crema, red curry paste; Contestants: Christian Petroni, Chef and Restaurateur, Barcelona, Greenwich, CT (Episode 4.5 – "Mussels Mastery & Cotton Candy Can-Do") (eliminated after the appetizer); Rebecca Newell, Executive Chef, The Beehive, Boston, MA (Episode 5.3 – "Squashed") (eliminated after the entrée); Mario Tolentino, Private Chef, Can Cook Personal Chef Services, New York, NY (Episode 4.2 – "My Froggy Clementine") (eliminated after the dessert); Ric Orlando, Chef and Restaurateur, New World Home Cooking, Saugerties, NY (Episode 5.2 – "Wok This Way") (advances to final round) (winner); Notes: This is part four of a five-part tournament.
60	8	"$50,000 Tournament: Grand Finale"	Geoffrey Zakarian, Alex Guarnaschelli, and Marc Murphy	September 28, 2010
Ingredients: Appetizer: geoduck, Buddha's hand, black radishes, waffle cones; Entrée: smelt, dried red currants, cheese curls, rack of wild boar; Dessert: champagne, dragon fruit, tahini, cake flour; Contestants: Marc Anthony Bynum, Executive Chef, Venúe 56, Hauppauge, NY (Episode 4.8 – "Quahog Quandaries and Pickle Puzzles") (eliminated after the appetizer); Ric Orlando, Chef and Restaurateur, New World Home Cooking, Saugerties, NY (Episode 5.2 – "Wok This Way") (eliminated after the entrée); Jason Zukas, Executive Chef, New York, NY (Episode 2.1 – "Salty Veggies & Heated Battles") (eliminated after the dessert); Madison Cowan, Chef and Caterer, Avenue Inc, New York, NY (Episode 4.12 – "Crunch Time") (winner); Notes: This is the final part of the first Chopped tournament. The chefs were given 50 minutes in the dessert round rather than the usual 30 to allow adequate time to bake.
61	9	"Spouting Off"	Amanda Freitag, Alex Guarnaschelli, and Geoffrey Zakarian	October 5, 2010
Ingredients: Appetizer: barramundi, apricot paste, poblano peppers, abbey style beer; Entrée: bratwurst, scallops, plums, red quinoa; Dessert: Israeli couscous, cherimoya, guanciale, Irish whiskey; Contestants: Sung Uni Lee, Culinary Instructor, Brooklyn, NY (eliminated after the appetizer); Janine Gray, Chef and Restaurateur, The Inn at Osborne Hill, Fishkill, NY (eliminated after the entrée); Bryce Shuman, Sous Chef, Eleven Madison Park, New York, NY (eliminated after the dessert); Joe Raiola, Executive Chef, Morton's Steakhouse, Brooklyn, NY (winner); Notes: In the dessert round, Ted warned the contestants that cherimoya seeds were poisonous.
62	10	"When Octopuses Attack"	Aarón Sánchez, Alex Guarnaschelli, and Marc Murphy	October 12, 2010
Ingredients: Appetizer: lotus root, treviso, guava nectar, octopus; Entrée: flank steak, chicory, pepino melon, granola bars; Dessert: shiso leaves, pita bread, feta, adzuki beans; Contestants: Anthony "Anton" Testino, Head Chef, Tony's Touch of Italy, Wayne, NJ (eliminated after the appetizer); Merlin Tlapa, Executive Chef, Nino's 208, New York, NY (eliminated after the entrée); Mona James, Executive Sous chef, Palm Restaurant, New York, NY (eliminated after the dessert); Cory Comeau, Executive Chef, Stephanie's on Newbury, Boston, MA (winner)
63	11	"Fright Bites"	Chris Santos, Amanda Freitag, and Geoffrey Zakarian	October 19, 2010
Ingredients: Appetizer: canned pumpkin, malted chocolate balls, pie crust, lamb heart; Entrée: gummy teeth, flour tortillas, huitlacoche, black chicken; Dessert: kumquats, cheddar pennies, chipotle chiles, grasshoppers; Contestants: Mike Solyn, Freelance Chef, New York, NY (eliminated after the appetizer); Marja Samsom, Chef and Restaurateur, The Kitchen Club, New York, NY (eliminated after the entrée); Tess Middlebrook, Private Chef, New York, NY (eliminated after the dessert); Michael Vignola, Executive Chef, Michael Jordan's Steak House, New York, NY (winner); Notes: This was the first Halloween-themed episode of the series. Chef Mike forgot an ingredient, malted milk balls, in Round 1 which led to his elimination. Chef Michael forgot his tortillas in Round 2 but moved on. Chef Michael is the first contestant to completely forget an ingredient and still win the competition.
64	12	"Cornuchopia"	Chris Santos, Sue Torres, and Marc Murphy	November 16, 2010
Ingredients: Appetizer: baked ham, cranberry sauce, baby turnips, port wine cheese; Entrée: pheasant, Brussels sprouts, candy apples, sparkling cider; Dessert: puff pastry, enoki mushrooms, seedless red grapes, plum sauce; Contestants: Harold Moore, Chef and Restaurateur, Commerce, New York, NY (eliminated after the appetizer); Izzy Sarto, Executive Chef, Tremont 647, Boston, MA (eliminated after the entrée); Robyn Moore, Private Chef and Instructor, New York, NY (eliminated after the dessert); Milton Enriquez, Executive Chef, Compass, New York, NY (winner); Notes: This was a Thanksgiving-themed episode with corresponding, seasonal ingredients in the baskets. The chefs had to stick to a Thanksgiving theme for all three courses.
65	13	"Yes, Virginia, There is a Chopping Block"	Aarón Sánchez, Alex Guarnaschelli, and Marc Murphy	November 28, 2010
Ingredients: Appetizer: oysters, pomegranate juice, red chard, gingerbread cookie dough; Entrée: goose, Irish cream liqueur, maraschino cherries, blue cheese; Dessert: pasilla chiles, peppermint patties, sour cream, boniatos; Contestants: Kenneth Collins, Executive Chef, Gospel Uptown, New York, NY (eliminated after the appetizer); Patricio Sandoval, Chef and Restaurateur, Mercadito, New York, NY (eliminated after the entrée); Laura Simpson, Chef de cuisine, The Hotel Hershey, Hershey, PA (eliminated after the dessert); Wade Burch, Executive Chef, South West NY, New York, NY (winner); Notes: This was a holiday-themed episode. The chefs were directed to prepare holiday-themed dishes for each course. The chefs were given 40 minutes in the entrée round rather than the normal 30 in order to allow time to properly cook the goose.

=== Season 6 (2011) ===
- This is the first season where fewer than 13 episodes were produced.

No. overall	No. in season	Title	Judges	Original release date
66	1	"Victory on the Brain"	Scott Conant, Geoffrey Zakarian, and Aarón Sánchez	January 4, 2011
Ingredients: Appetizer: tamarind soda, cocktail nuts, haricots verts, goat brains; Entrée: Cream of Coconut, baby turnips, wakame seaweed, fish heads; Dessert: peanut brittle, marsala wine, wonton wrappers, durian; Contestants: Colin Kruzic, Executive Chef, New York, NY (eliminated after the appetizer); Samantha Buyskes, Chef and Restaurateur, Simply Red Bistro, Ithaca, NY (eliminated after the entrée); Sammy Davis Jr., Executive Chef, CR Lounge, Baltimore, MD (eliminated after the dessert); Alejandra Padilla, Line Cook, La Fonda del Sol, New York, NY (winner); Notes: The fish heads used in the entrée round were from northeastern cod.
67	2	"Prove it on the Plate"	Scott Conant, Maneet Chauhan, and Geoffrey Zakarian	January 11, 2011
Ingredients: Appetizer: New Zealand mussels, Bosc pears, marula liqueur, frozen waffles; Entrée: root beer schnapps, lap cheong, squash blossoms, ostrich tenderloin; Dessert: puffed rice cereal, horned melon, cashew butter, gummy worms; Contestants: Andrea Glick, Private Chef and Instructor, Long Island, NY (eliminated after the appetizer); Lisa Beels, Executive Chef and Entrepreneur, Haute Palate and Petite Palate, New York, NY (eliminated after the entrée); Nick Grosz, Executive Chef, Norwood Club, New York, NY (eliminated after the dessert); Eric Levine, Executive Chef, Encore Catering, East Hanover, NJ (winner); Notes: This is Maneet Chauhan's first episode as a judge.
68	3	"Marrowly We Roll Along"	Scott Conant, Amanda Freitag, and Marc Murphy	January 18, 2011
Ingredients: Appetizer: speck, toybox squash, fontina cheese, marrow bones; Entrée: yuzu marmalade, chicory, dried blueberries, Dungeness crab; Dessert: pineapple, sunflower seeds, red curry paste, Neapolitan ice cream; Contestants: Carmine DiGiovanni, Chef de cuisine, Picholine, New York, NY (eliminated after the appetizer); Sean Telo, Chef de cuisine, Atlanta, GA (eliminated after the entrée); Andrew Markert, Executive Sous chef, PS7, Washington, DC (eliminated after the dessert); Laura Henry-Zoubir, Culinary Director, Dramshop Hospitality, Boston, MA (winner)
69	4	"Doughs and Don'ts"	Scott Conant, Amanda Freitag, and Chris Santos	January 25, 2011
Ingredients: Appetizer: saba, garlic shoots, Canadian bacon, trout; Entrée: dehydrated okra, parsnips, espresso soda, deckle of beef; Dessert: coquitos, turmeric, empanada wrappers, corn on the cob; Contestants: Rob Runn, Food Service Specialist, USCGC Sturgeon Bay (WTGB-109), Bayonne, NJ (eliminated after the appetizer); Monica Byrne, Chef and Restaurateur, Home/Made, Brooklyn, NY (eliminated after the entrée); Anna Maria Santorelli, Chef and Restaurateur, Anna Maria's, Larchmont, NY (eliminated after the dessert); James Gillespie, Culinary Instructor, New York, NY (winner); Notes: Chef Santorelli cut herself badly in the appetizer round and as a result was severely limited for the rest of the competition.
70	5	"Step Right Up!"	Scott Conant, Alex Guarnaschelli, and Aarón Sánchez	February 1, 2011
Ingredients: Appetizer: catfish, tomatillos, marshmallows, rutabagas; Entrée: country pork ribs, dandelion greens, Jerusalem artichokes, fresh garbanzo beans; Dessert: plum tomatoes, jalapeño peppers, crema, malanga coco; Contestants: James Kilberg, Executive Chef, Il Poggiolo, Chicago, IL (eliminated after the appetizer); Gillian Clark, Chef and Restaurateur, The General Store, Silver Spring, MD (eliminated after the entrée); Jeffrey Gardner, Sous chef, South City Kitchen Midtown, Atlanta, GA (eliminated after the dessert); Marcellus Coleman, Executive Sous chef, Abe and Arthur's, New York, NY (winner)
71	6	"All-Stars Tournament: Round One – Competitors from The Next Food Network Star"	Marcus Samuelsson, Alex Guarnaschelli, and Marc Murphy	March 6, 2011
Ingredients: Appetizer: calf's liver, mango, bottarga, pound cake; Entrée: karela, blueberries, fregola, Scottish red leg partridge; Dessert: red carrots, goat's butter, paneer, potato crisps; Contestants: Lisa Garza (TNFNS season 4 runner-up) (charity: Vogel Alcove – Dallas, TX) (eliminated after the appetizer); Debbie Lee (TNFNS season 5 third place) (charity: Medici Foundation – Irvine, CA) (eliminated after the entrée); Brad Sorenson (TNFNS season 6 fifth place) (charity: American Cancer Society – Atlanta, GA) (eliminated after the dessert); Michael Proietti (TNFNS season 5 fifth place) (charity: The Jed Foundation – New York, NY) (advances to final round) (winner); Notes: This was the first of a 5-part series of episodes in which groups of celebrity chefs competed to win $50,000 for charity. This was also the first time celebrities competed on Chopped. Lisa Garza forgot three ingredients in Round 1 and was chopped.
72	7	"All-Stars Tournament: Round Two – Food Network Personalities"	Marc Murphy, Alex Guarnaschelli, and Marcus Samuelsson	March 13, 2011
Ingredients: Appetizer: teething biscuits, Hungarian hot peppers, raspberries, canned haggis; Entrée: rack of venison, dulse, gooseberry preserves, fruit ring cereal; Dessert: ladyfingers, baby fennel, almond paste, root beer jelly beans; Contestants: Duff Goldman (Ace of Cakes, notable competitor on Food Network Challenge) (charity: Lower Eastside Girls Club – New York, NY) (eliminated after the appetizer); Claire Robinson (5 Ingredient Fix, Food Network Challenge) (charity: St. Jude Children's Research Hospital – Memphis, TN) (eliminated after the entrée); Robert Irvine (Dinner: Impossible, Worst Cooks in America, Restaurant: Impossible) (charity: World Outreach Ministries – Marietta, GA) (eliminated after the dessert); Anne Burrell (Secrets of a Restaurant Chef, Worst Cooks in America) (charity: Juvenile Diabetes Research Foundation – New York, NY) (advances to final round) (winner); Notes: This is part 2 of a 5-part tournament. In the appetizer round, Anne got hot oil in her eye but completed the competition. Claire Robinson forgot venison and sauce on one of the plates in the entrée round.
73	8	"All-Stars Tournament: Round Three – Notable Chefs"	Marc Murphy, Alex Guarnaschelli, and Marcus Samuelsson	March 20, 2011
Ingredients: Appetizer: fresh pasta, dried papaya, bluefoot mushrooms, chorizo; Entrée: cobia, salmon jerky, Chinese spinach, animal crackers; Dessert: granola bars, heirloom cherry tomatoes, Chinese five spice, piloncillo; Contestants: Jacques Torres (charity: St. Jude Children's Research Hospital – Memphis, TN) (eliminated after the appetizer); Beau MacMillan (charity: Space Coast Early Intervention Center – Melbourne, FL) (eliminated after the entrée); Anita Lo (charity: SHARE – New York, NY) (eliminated after the dessert); Nate Appleman (charity: Kawasaki Disease Foundation – Ipswich, MA) (advances to final round) (winner); Notes: This is part 3 of a 5-part tournament. In the appetizer round, Chef Torres used (cocoa nibs) that he brought with him, which were not available in the pantry. The judges felt that this was contrary to the rules and cited it as the reason for his elimination.
74	9	"All-Stars Tournament: Round Four – Chopped Judges"	Chris Santos, Alex Guarnaschelli, and Marc Murphy	March 27, 2011
Ingredients: Appetizer: papadum, baby romanesco, smoked lake chub, powdered strawberry milk; Entrée: taralli, natto, radicchio, whole duck; Dessert: green plantains, Chinese bacon, peanut butter puff cereal, frozen lemonade; Contestants: Maneet Chauhan (charity: Clinton Global Initiative – New York, NY) (eliminated after the appetizer); Amanda Freitag (charity: God's Love We Deliver – New York, NY) (eliminated after the entrée); Geoffrey Zakarian (charity: The Kimmins Foundation – Tampa, FL) (eliminated after the dessert); Aarón Sánchez (charity: Greater New Orleans Foundation – New Orleans, LA) (advances to final round) (winner); Notes: This is part 4 of a 5-part tournament. This is the first time the Chopped judges competed. The chefs were given 40 minutes in the entrée round rather than the normal 30 to allow time to properly cook the duck.
75	10	"All-Stars Tournament: Grand Finale"	Marc Murphy, Alex Guarnaschelli, and Marcus Samuelsson	April 3, 2011
Ingredients: Appetizer: rabbit kidneys, baby beets, merguez, salt and vinegar potato chips; Entrée: goat leg, dried hibiscus flower, pattypan squash, trail mix; Dessert: sesame candies, ruby red grapefruit, chayotes, chickpeas; Contestants: Michael Proietti (charity: The Jed Foundation – New York, NY) (eliminated after the appetizer); Anne Burrell (charity: Juvenile Diabetes Research Foundation – New York, NY) (eliminated after the entrée); Aarón Sánchez (charity: Greater New Orleans Foundation – New Orleans, LA) (eliminated after the dessert); Nate Appleman (charity: Kawasaki Disease Foundation – Ipswich, MA) (winner); Notes: This is the last part of a 5-part tournament. The chefs who won the previous four heats returned to compete for $50,000 towards their charity.
76	11	"A Cornish Mess"	Scott Conant, Maneet Chauhan, and Chris Santos	April 10, 2011
Ingredients: Appetizer: graffiti eggplant, cape gooseberries, biscuit dough, Peking duck; Entrée: Cornish hens, Concord grapes, gruyère cheese, banana leather; Dessert: Italian orange liqueur, cheese crackers, cherimoya, Jordan almonds; Contestants: Gillie Holme, Caterer, New York, NY (eliminated after the appetizer); Ondre'a Duverney, Caterer, New York, NY (eliminated after the entrée); David Greco, Chef and Restaurateur, Arthur Avenue Trattoria and Mike's Deli, New York, NY (eliminated after the dessert); Lauren Gerrie, Caterer, Big Little Get Together, New York, NY (winner); Notes: In the entrée round, Chef Duverney committed cross-contamination by cutting her cooked hens on the same cutting board where she put her raw hens without flipping or changing the board. Chef Greco served undercooked, raw hen due to the time constraints. The judges allowed both of them to bring over the other components of the dish from their stations. The judges ultimately decided to eliminate chef Duverney because she committed cross-contamination, whereas chef Greco did not. In the dessert round, Ted warned the chefs that cherimoya seeds were poisonous. However, Chef Greco got two seeds on one plate. He did not get them in his dish so it was still edible however that resulted in his elimination.
77	12	"Chefs on a Mission"	Scott Conant, Amanda Freitag, and Chris Santos	April 26, 2011
Ingredients: Appetizer: firm tofu, scotch whisky, dragon fruit, pickled herring; Entrée: rump roast, violet mustard, asparagus, sugar-coated fennel seeds; Dessert: mission figs, robiola cheese, shelled pistachios, taco shells; Contestants: Ulli Stachl, Food Stylist, New York, NY (eliminated after the appetizer); Joel Javier, Sous chef, Telepan, New York, NY (eliminated after the entrée); Steven Brand, Executive Chef, Upstairs on the Square, Cambridge, MA (eliminated after the dessert); Jamie Bissonnette, Chef and Restaurateur, Toro and Coppa, Boston, MA (winner)

=== Season 7 (2011) ===
No. overall	No. in season	Title	Judges	Original release date
78	1	"The Icing on the Steak"	Chris Santos, Amanda Freitag, and Marc Murphy	May 3, 2011
Ingredients: Appetizer: smoked turkey legs, ramen noodles, cherry bomb peppers, endive; Entrée: celery root, rainbow chard, flat iron steak, chocolate frosting; Dessert: bananas, pomegranate juice, phyllo dough, white miso; Contestants: Crystal Fox, Chef, Sisters Night Club, Philadelphia, PA (eliminated after the appetizer); Marco Suarez, Executive Chef, Ledge Kitchen and Drinks, Dorchester, MA (eliminated after the entrée); Tryg Siverson, Chef and Restaurateur, Friedman's Lunch, New York, NY (eliminated after the dessert); Shehu Fitzgerald, Garde manger Chef, Marriott New York Marquis, New York, NY (winner); Notes: Chef Fox cut herself in Round 1.
79	2	"Canned Cheese, Please!"	Chris Santos, Amanda Freitag, and Aarón Sánchez	May 10, 2011
Ingredients: Appetizer: andouille sausage, lychees in syrup, jalapeño peppers, canned cheese; Entrée: buckwheat groats, jews mallow, hard cider, elk tenderloin; Dessert: strawberry popsicles, blue corn tortilla chips, condensed milk, celery; Contestants: Billy Brigtsen, Chef, Brooklyn, NY (eliminated after the appetizer); Monica Langowski, Private Chef, A Table For Two Private Chef Service, Chicago, IL (eliminated after the entrée); Kyle Ricks, Executive Sous chef, Landmarc Tribeca, New York, NY (eliminated after the dessert); Danielle Saunders, Private Chef, New York, NY (winner); Notes: Chef Ricks is a chef at Landmarc, owned by Chopped judge, Marc Murphy.
80	3	"Saying Sayonara"	Geoffrey Zakarian, Amanda Freitag, and Aarón Sánchez	May 17, 2011
Ingredients: Appetizer: oysters, clementine oranges, Chinese okra, French dressing; Entrée: duck breasts, green tea, adzuki beans, Brussels sprouts; Dessert: Meyer lemons, cottage cheese, passionfruit, soba noodles; Contestants: Rosalind Balducci, Personal Chef / Caterer, That Personal Touch Cuisine, New York, NY (eliminated after the appetizer); Shawn Dickensheets, Culinary Student, Culinary Institute of America, Hyde Park, NY (eliminated after the entrée); Adam Powers, Chef and Restaurateur, Fetch, New York, NY (eliminated after the dessert); Wayne Lyons, Chef and Restaurateur, Soul Flavors, Jersey City, NJ (winner); Notes: Chef Balducci forgot her french dressing in the appetizer and didn't get her clementines on all the plates.
81	4	"Have a Heart"	Aarón Sánchez, Alex Guarnaschelli, and Ken Oringer	May 24, 2011
Ingredients: Appetizer: bay scallops, braeburn apples, sorrel, duck hearts; Entrée: fideos, broccoli rabe, mezcal, eel; Dessert: crumpets, cream cheese, aloe vera juice, orange slice candy; Contestants: John Ramirez, Executive Sous chef, Castle on the Hudson, Tarrytown, NY (eliminated after the appetizer); Remy Ayesh, Culinary Instructor, French Culinary Institute, New York, NY (eliminated after the entrée); Judson Branch, Senior Sous Chef, Marriott Downtown Philadelphia, Philadelphia, PA (eliminated after the dessert); Justin Burdett, Chef de cuisine, Miller Union, Atlanta, GA (winner); Notes: Chef Ramirez refused to plate the duck hearts because they weren't cooked in time, resulting in his elimination.
82	5	"Gotta Grill!"	Amanda Freitag, Alex Guarnaschelli, and Geoffrey Zakarian	May 31, 2011
Ingredients: Appetizer: coho salmon, baby eggplant, mustard; Entrée: rack of wild boar, artichokes, ketchup, sauerkraut; Dessert: mayonnaise, bananas, prickly pear cactus, pre-cooked pizza crust; Contestants: Vucic "Vulé" Dabetic, Executive Chef, Arcane, New York, NY (eliminated after the appetizer); Tom McEachern, Executive Chef, Ray's on the River, Atlanta, GA (eliminated after the entrée); Phyllis Kaplowitz, Executive Chef, Bakers' Best Catering, Boston, MA (eliminated after the dessert); Alan Harding, Chef and Restaurateur, The Food Truck @ Hot Bird, Brooklyn, NY (winner); Notes: This was a grilling-themed episode. The stovetops were outfitted with grill sheets and two other burners and the ovens were off-limits throughout the competition. The chefs were also given pre-soaked cedar planks that they could use if they wished. This was the first time since season 5 that there were only three basket ingredients in the appetizer round instead of four.
83	6	"Get it Together"	Aarón Sánchez, Amanda Freitag, and Marc Murphy	June 7, 2011
Ingredients: Appetizer: corn nuts, fruit cocktail, black garlic, Uni; Entrée: watermelon, dried shrimp, dried porcini mushrooms, Hawaiian snapper; Dessert: challah, almond butter, tamarind pods, delicata squash; Contestants: Matthew Marchese, Personal Chef, New York, NY (eliminated after the appetizer); Mark Barrett, Chef, Henry's, New York, NY (eliminated after the entrée); Wei Wen, Executive Chef, Susanna Foo Gourmet Kitchen, Radnor, PA (eliminated after the dessert); Heather Priest, Personal Chef, Greenwich, CT (winner)
84	7	"Bite Your Pickled Beef Tongue"	Chris Santos, Maneet Chauhan, and Geoffrey Zakarian	June 14, 2011
Ingredients: Appetizer: flour tortillas, English cucumbers, fresh fava beans, pickled beef tongue; Entrée: pork rinds, galangal, purple kohlrabi, rabbit legs and thighs; Dessert: labne, chickpea flour, Asian pears, rose water syrup; Contestants: Amy Goffio-Mahabir, Sous chef, NYU Medical Center, New York, NY (eliminated after the appetizer); Chris Scott, Chef and Restaurateur, Brooklyn Commune, Brooklyn, NY (eliminated after the entrée); Sean Olnowich, Chef and Restaurateur, The House, New York, NY (eliminated after the dessert); Joe Landa, Executive Chef, Jewish Theological Seminary, New York, NY (winner)
85	8	"Go For It!"	Geoffrey Zakarian, Amanda Freitag, and Aarón Sánchez	June 21, 2011
Ingredients: Appetizer: gorgonzola cheese, green papaya, sour lemon candies, duck livers; Entrée: tequila, epazote, puff pastry, cuttlefish; Dessert: cocoa nibs, blackberries, corn tortillas, ginger; Contestants: Emily Sims, Executive Chef, Ici, New York, NY (eliminated after the appetizer); Jonathan Doar, Sous chef, Fishtail by David Burke, New York, NY (eliminated after the entrée); Stephen Hartigan, Private Chef, The Field, Bridgeport, CT (eliminated after the dessert); Olivier Desaintmartin, Chef and Restaurateur, Caribou Café, Philadelphia, PA (winner)
86	9	"Thyme Flies"	Aarón Sánchez, Alex Guarnaschelli, and Marc Murphy	June 28, 2011
Ingredients: Appetizer: Korean-style short ribs, lemon thyme, zucchini, gefilte fish; Entrée: hen of the woods mushrooms, white anchovies, lamb top round, salsa con queso; Dessert: dried apricots, gingerbread cookie dough, elderflower liqueur, halva; Contestants: Marc Matsumoto, Private Chef, New York, NY (eliminated after the appetizer); James Lee, Chef and Restaurateur, New York, NY (eliminated after the entrée); April Stamm, Chef Team Leader, Prepared foods at Whole Foods Market, New York, NY (eliminated after the dessert); Marie-Claude Mendy, Executive Chef/Owner, Teranga, Boston, MA (winner); Notes: In the entrée round, Chef Lee cut himself, but continued cooking and touching the ingredients despite bleeding through several layers of gloves. The judges considered this unsanitary, so they did not taste his entrée. This resulted in Chef Lee being eliminated.
87	10	"Nopales, No Problem"	Geoffrey Zakarian, Amanda Freitag, and Marc Murphy	July 5, 2011
Ingredients: Appetizer: quahog clams, fuyu persimmons, Italian bitters, nopales; Entrée: halibut, purple cauliflower, salted duck egg yolks, pork skin; Dessert: Mexican chocolate, mostarda, soft tofu, pretzel rods; Contestants: Chris Rendell, Chef de cuisine, Double Crown, New York, NY (eliminated after the appetizer); Ronaldo Linares, Chef and Restaurateur, Martino's Cuban Restaurant, Somerville, NJ (eliminated after the entrée); Denise Baron, Executive Chef, Burtons Grill & Bar, Boston, MA (eliminated after the dessert); Miguel Aguilar, Executive Chef, Piquant, New York, NY (winner)

=== Season 8 (2011) ===
Important note: Lance technically won but gifted the prize money to Magris so she could see her dying grandmother in France.

No. overall	No. in season	Title	Judges	Original release date
88	1	"Easy Peasy?"	Geoffrey Zakarian, Amanda Freitag, and Marc Murphy	July 12, 2011
Ingredients: Appetizer: buffalo hot dogs, carrots, edamame, butterscotch candy; Entrée: pork loin, crunchy cheese curls, escarole, chia seeds; Dessert: grape flavored gelatin, lemon verbena, brie, shortbread cookies; Contestants: Tristan Welch, Chef Patron, Launceston Place, Kensington, London, England (eliminated after the appetizer); Andy Bates, Pastry Chef, Eat My Pies Street Market, East London, England (eliminated after the entrée); Lotte Duncan, Chef and Culinary Instructor, English Country Cookery School, Buckinghamshire, England (eliminated after the dessert); Jun Tanaka, Executive Chef, Pearl Restaurant, London, England (winner); Notes: This is the first episode to feature four British chefs.
89	2	"Ladies First!"	Zakary Pelaccio, Amanda Freitag, and Geoffrey Zakarian	July 19, 2011
Ingredients: Appetizer: brown bread in a can, dried figs, frozen peas, duck white kidneys; Entrée: quail, Pedro Ximénez sherry, crosnes, cabbage; Dessert: crescent roll dough, dried currants, key lime juice, creamed corn; Contestants: Katherine See, Executive Chef, Kingfish Hall, Boston, MA (eliminated after the appetizer); Deirdre Henderson, Executive Chef, BarOnA, New York, NY (eliminated after the entrée); Cara Thompson, Executive Chef, The Bayou, Bellmore, NY (eliminated after the dessert); Suzanne Vizethann, Chef and Restaurateur, The Hungry Peach, Atlanta, GA (winner)
90	3	"Sweet Second Chance!"	Geoffrey Zakarian, Amanda Freitag, and Marc Murphy	July 26, 2011
Ingredients: Appetizer: pancake mix, guava nectar, Aleppo peppers, Asian style beef jerky; Entrée: fresh wasabi root, crab apples, collard greens, lamb hearts; Dessert: duck eggs, Russet potatoes, farmer's cheese, honey herb cough drops; Contestants: Chris Coombs, Chef and Restaurateur, Dbar, Boston, MA (Episode 4.1 – "Rattle & Roll") (eliminated after the appetizer); Siggy Sollitto, Chef and Restaurateur, Siggy's Good Food, Brooklyn Heights, NY (Episode 4.1 – "Rattle & Roll") (eliminated after the entrée); Yoanne Magris, Chef and Restaurateur, Yo In Yo Out, New York, NY (Episode 5.3 – "Squashed") (eliminated after the dessert); Lance Nitahara, Executive Chef, Camp-of-the-Woods, Speculator, NY (Episode 4.12 – "Crunch Time") (winner); Notes: This episode featured four past non-winners. This was the first "redemption" episode to feature a non-runner-up as well as the first to feature two chefs from the same previous episode. Chef Magris slipped and fell during the entrée round, spilling boiling water on herself and causing second-degree burns on both her legs. The judges gave Chef Magris the option to bow out of the competition but she elected to continue.
91	4	"Chard & True"	Aarón Sánchez, Alex Guarnaschelli, and Geoffrey Zakarian	August 2, 2011
Ingredients: Appetizer: lime pickle, red chard, baby octopus, Tokyo scallions; Entrée: gingersnaps, sweet potatoes, farina, turbot; Dessert: cactus pear, soft pretzels, farmhouse cheddar, wheat beer; Contestants: Ben Sargent, Seafood Chef, Brooklyn, NY (eliminated after the appetizer); Jay Jones, Caterer, Chateau Noir Catering, New York, NY (eliminated after the entrée); Tina Aleandri, Executive Chef, Noche Tequila and Tapas Bar, Atlanta, GA (eliminated after the dessert); Elisabeth Weinberg, Caterer, Miss Elisabeth's Catering, New York, NY (winner)
92	5	"My Way"	Aarón Sánchez, Geoffrey Zakarian, and Marc Murphy	August 9, 2011
Ingredients: Appetizer: smoked oysters, starfruit, jicama, whole calamari; Entrée: jumbo shrimp, crème de cassis, black quinoa, pastrami; Dessert: matzo, Lady Gala apples, walnuts, borscht; Contestants: Daniel Moreno, Sous chef, BLT Steak, New York, NY (eliminated after the appetizer); Jason Marcus, Chef and Restaurateur, Traif, Brooklyn, NY (eliminated after the entrée); Kelvin Fernandez, Chef de cuisine, Strand Hotel, New York, NY (eliminated after the dessert); Jennifer Cole, Executive Chef, Taberna, New York, NY (winner)
93	6	"A is for Apple. U is for Udon"	Aarón Sánchez, Amanda Freitag, and Geoffrey Zakarian	August 16, 2011
Ingredients: Appetizer: udon noodles, watermelon radish, razor clams, pickled eggplant; Entrée: sweet vermouth, leeks, French fingerling potatoes, live diver scallops; Dessert: Thai basil, marinated cippolini onions, Black Oxford apples, rolled oats; Contestants: Denis Weekes, Executive Chef, World Yacht, New York, NY (eliminated after the appetizer); Debra Whiting, Chef and Restaurateur, Red Newt Cellars Winery and Bistro, Hector, NY (eliminated after the entrée); Raffaele Spadavecchia, Executive Chef, Scottadito Osteria Toscana, Brooklyn, NY (eliminated after the dessert); Christopher Thames, Caterer, Distinctive Fare Catering, Philadelphia, PA (winner); Notes: This episode was dedicated to the memory of Debra Whiting, who was killed in a car accident June 30, 2011, before the episode was broadcast.
94	7	"Trick or Treat, Chicken Feet!"	Chris Santos, Alex Guarnaschelli, and Geoffrey Zakarian	October 16, 2011
Ingredients: Appetizer: pre-cooked chicken feet, poblano peppers, black radishes, fruit-flavored candy; Entrée: blood sausage, frog legs, sea beans, Halloween candy; Dessert: ossa dei morti, apple cider, ricotta salata, black licorice; Contestants: Rodney Henry, Pie Maker, Dangerously Delicious Pies, Baltimore, MD / Washington, DC (eliminated after the appetizer); Cris Spezial, Caterer, Nyack Gourmet, Nyack, NY (eliminated after the entrée); Michelle Firlit-Garcia, Pastry Chef, Bleeding Heart Bakery, Chicago, IL (eliminated after the dessert); Michael DiIonno, Chef and Restaurateur, Avenue Bistro Pub, Verona, NJ (winner); Notes: This was a Halloween-themed episode. The Halloween candy provided in the entrée round was a mixture of traditional Halloween candies, such as candy corn.
95	8	"Give It Your All"	Aarón Sánchez, Alex Guarnaschelli, and Marc Murphy	November 15, 2011
Ingredients: Appetizer: pomegranates, polenta log, maple syrup, seafood sausage; Entrée: turducken, sugar pumpkin, Concord grape wine, Indian corn; Dessert: pumpkin beer, fresh cranberries, pecans, instant potatoes; Contestants: Allison Sosna, Executive Chef, DC Central Kitchen, Washington, DC (eliminated after the appetizer); Steve Jackson, Personal Chef, Chicago Bulls, Chicago, IL (eliminated after the entrée); Arlene Stewart, Personal Chef, New York, NY (eliminated after the dessert); Daniel Bojorquez, Chef de cuisine, Sel de la Terre, Boston, MA (winner); Notes: This was a Thanksgiving-themed episode. The chefs were directed to prepare holiday-themed dishes for each course.
96	9	"Can't Catch Me, I'm the Gingerbread Lobster!"	Aarón Sánchez, Alex Guarnaschelli, and Marc Murphy	December 6, 2011
Ingredients: Appetizer: lobster, harissa, candy cane beets, gingerbread house; Entrée: rack of lamb, ruby port, brussels sprouts, white chocolate chips; Dessert: plums, candy canes, fruitcake, hot cocoa mix; Contestants: Bun Lai, Chef and Restaurateur, Miya's Sushi, New Haven, CT (eliminated after the appetizer); Renita Mendonca, Culinary Instructor, Cambridge School of Culinary Arts, Cambridge, MA (eliminated after the entrée); Rachel Klein, Executive Chef, Seaport Hotel, Boston, MA (eliminated after the dessert); Jonny Giordani, Executive Chef, BOOM, New York, NY (winner); Notes: This was a holiday-themed episode. The chefs were directed to prepare holiday-themed dishes for each course. Chef Lai cut his palm during the appetizer round but did not tend to the wound because he thought the blood on the plate was a smudge of harissa; the judges did not taste his dish as a result and he was eliminated.

=== Season 9 (2011) ===
No. overall	No. in season	Title	Judges	Original release date
97	1	"Champions' Tournament: Part 1"	Geoffrey Zakarian, Alex Guarnaschelli, and Marcus Samuelsson	August 30, 2011
Ingredients: Appetizer: Chinese celery, fresh chickpeas, preserved lemons, country-style pâté; Entrée: rack of antelope, stinging nettles, jicama, port wine cheese; Dessert: nopales, sweet potatoes, pie crust, mezcal; Contestants: Wayne Lyons, Chef and Restaurateur, Soul Flavors, Jersey City, NJ (Episode 7.3 – "Saying Sayonara") (eliminated after the appetizer); Heather Priest, Personal Chef, Greenwich, CT (Episode 7.6 – "Get it Together") (eliminated after the entrée); James Gillespie, Culinary Instructor, New York, NY (Episode 6.4 – "Doughs and Don'ts") (eliminated after the dessert); Wade Burch, Executive Chef, South West NY, New York, NY (Episode 5.13 – "Yes Virginia, There is a Chopping Block") (advances to final round) (winner); Notes: This was the first of a five-part series of episodes, where sixteen past champions competed. The winner of each preliminary round advanced to the finale, where they competed for $50,000. Chef Wayne didn't get two ingredients on the plate in time in Round 1 resulting in his elimination.
98	2	"Champions' Tournament: Part 2"	Geoffrey Zakarian, Maneet Chauhan, and Aarón Sánchez	September 6, 2011
Ingredients: Appetizer: frosted wheat cereal, baby red romaine lettuce, black garlic, quahog clams; Entrée: tuna belly, lemon curd, purple cauliflower, dried cuttlefish snack; Dessert: cacao beans, masa, pisco, gorgonzola dolce; Contestants: Shehu Fitzgerald, Chef, Ritz Carlton, New York, NY (Episode 7.1 – "The Icing on the Steak") (eliminated after the appetizer); Alejandra Padilla, Sous chef, La Fonda del Sol, New York, NY (Episode 6.1 – "Victory on the Brain") (eliminated after the entrée); Michael Vignola, Executive Chef, Michael Jordan's Steak House, New York, NY (Episode 5.11 – "Fright Bites") (eliminated after the dessert); Danielle Saunders, Private Chef, New York, NY (Episode 7.2 – "Canned Cheese, Please!") (advances to final round) (winner); Notes: This is the second part of a five-part tournament where past champions compete.
99	3	"Champions' Tournament: Part 3"	Marc Murphy, Alex Guarnaschelli, and Susan Feniger	September 13, 2011
Ingredients: Appetizer: Alaskan king crab legs, star fruit, bonito flakes, Mexican chorizo; Entrée: tilefish, fig cookies, caperberries, squid ink; Dessert: vanilla cognac, guava paste, barley flour, duck fat; Contestants: Miguel Aguilar, Executive Chef, Piquant, New York, NY (Episode 7.10 – "Nopales, No Problem") (eliminated after the appetizer); Laura Henry-Zoubir, Culinary Director, Dramshop Hospitality, Boston, MA (Episode 6.3 – "Marrowly We Roll Along") (eliminated after the entrée); Jamie Bissonnette, Chef and Restaurateur, Toro and Coppa, Boston, MA (Episode 6.12 – "Chefs on a Mission") (eliminated after the dessert); Lauren Gerrie, Caterer, Big Little Get Together, New York, NY (Episode 6.11 – "A Cornish Mess") (advances to final round) (winner); Notes: This is the third part of a five-part tournament where past champions compete.
100	4	"Champions' Tournament: Part 4"	Geoffrey Zakarian, Alex Guarnaschelli, and Maneet Chauhan	September 20, 2011
Ingredients: Appetizer: lamb fries, ras el hanout, blood orange syrup, hot cross buns; Entrée: wreck fish, sabudana poha, green tomatoes, huitlacoche; Dessert: macaroni and cheese, apples, raw cashews, cane syrup; Contestants: Justin Burdett, Chef de cuisine, Miller Union, Atlanta, GA (Episode 7.4 – "Have A Heart") (eliminated after the appetizer); Eric Levine, Executive Chef, Encore Catering, East Hanover, NJ (Episode 6.2 – "Prove it on the Plate") (eliminated after the entrée); Marie-Claude Mendy, Chef and Restaurateur, Teranga, Boston, MA (Episode 7.9 – "Thyme Flies") (eliminated after the dessert); Alan Harding, Chef, The Food Truck @ Hot Bird, Brooklyn, NY (Episode 7.5 – "Gotta Grill!") (advances to final round) (winner); Notes: This is the fourth part of a five-part tournament where past champions compete.
101	5	"Champions' Tournament: Grand Finale"	Marc Murphy, Alex Guarnaschelli, and Aarón Sánchez	September 27, 2011
Ingredients: Appetizer: catfish, daikon radish, cherry soda, boiled peanuts; Entrée: kettle corn, chayotes, apple sauce, roasted suckling pig; Dessert: araucana eggs, bread flour, turbinado sugar, goat's milk; Contestants: Alan Harding, Chef, The Food Truck @ Hot Bird, Brooklyn, NY (Episode 7.5 – "Gotta Grill!") (eliminated after the appetizer); Wade Burch, Executive Chef, South West NY, New York, NY (Episode 5.13 – "Yes Virginia, There is a Chopping Block") (eliminated after the entrée); Lauren Gerrie, Caterer, Big Little Get Together, New York, NY (Episode 6.11 – "A Cornish Mess") (eliminated after the dessert); Danielle Saunders, Private Chef, New York, NY (Episode 7.2 – "Canned Cheese, Please!") (winner); Notes: This is the final part of a five-part tournament where past champions compete. With her victory in this episode, Chef Saunders became the first female Chopped Grand Champion.
102	6	"Time & Space"	Scott Conant, Amanda Freitag, and Chris Santos	October 4, 2011
Ingredients: Appetizer: izote flowers, smoked butter, rhubarb, chicken in a can; Entrée: yellow miso, pork shoulder, mountain yam, astronaut ice cream; Dessert: margarita mix, quick cook grits, marionberry preserves, vanilla yogurt; Contestants: Van Dao, Chef and Restaurateur, Biscuit Bender, San Francisco, CA (eliminated after the appetizer); Ryan Goergen, Executive Chef, New York, NY (eliminated after the entrée); Ronnie Vincent, Executive Sous Chef, Joe's Stone Crab, Miami, FL (eliminated after the dessert); Helen Park, Executive Chef, New York, NY (winner)
103	7	"Everything's Rosy"	Scott Conant, Maneet Chauhan, and Marc Murphy	October 11, 2011
Ingredients: Appetizer: British piccalilli, biscuit dough, watercress, soft-shell crabs; Entrée: rack of wild boar, shishito peppers, posole, organic roses; Dessert: falooda glass noodles, oranges, graham crackers, Armenian string cheese; Contestants: Michael Maroni, Chef and Restaurateur, Maroni Cuisine, Northport, NY (eliminated after the appetizer); Gina Rodriguez, Executive Chef, Kokopelli Restaurant and Tequila Bar, Philadelphia, PA (eliminated after the entrée); Justin Bazdarich, Chef and Restaurateur, Speedy Romeo, Brooklyn, NY (eliminated after the dessert); Rob Evans, Chef and Restaurateur, Hugo's, Portland, ME (winner)
104	8	"Make A Splash!"	Marc Murphy, Amanda Freitag, and Seamus Mullen	October 25, 2011
Ingredients: Appetizer: broccoflower, unsweetened cranberry juice, madeleines, sea urchin; Entrée: canned mandarin oranges, red pearl onions, chicken thighs, pork hock; Dessert: gingerbread cookie dough, goat cheese, garam masala, strawberry syrup; Contestants: Kayne Raymond, Private Chef, Palo Alto, CA (eliminated after the appetizer); Wayne Cafariella, Sous chef, Tellers Chop House, Islip, NY (eliminated after the entrée); Adrianne Calvo, Chef and Restaurateur, Chef Adrianne's, Miami, FL (eliminated after the dessert); Lish Steiling, Assistant Food Stylist, Today, New York, NY (winner)
105	9	"One in a Hundred"	Chris Santos, Maneet Chauhan, and Marc Murphy	November 1, 2011
Ingredients: Appetizer: duck prosciutto, purple asparagus, Korean melon, Greek Easter bread; Entrée: barramundi, ramps, sun-dried tomatoes, unripened green almonds; Dessert: Kirby cucumbers, beignet mix, lemon-lime soda, nata de coco; Contestants: Tiffany Jeffries, Caterer, Sunday Dinner Catering Service, Brooklyn, NY (eliminated after the appetizer); Jackie Baldassari, Roundsman, Old York Country Club, Chesterfield, NJ (eliminated after the entrée); Dave Cusato, Sous chef, X_{2}O Xaviars on the Hudson, Yonkers, NY (eliminated after the dessert); Matt Lambert, Chef de cuisine, Musket Room, New York, NY (winner)
106	10	"Blood Orange Sorbet, Sweat, & Tears"	Scott Conant, Alex Guarnaschelli, and Chris Santos	November 8, 2011
Ingredients: Appetizer: breakfast sausage, cantaloupe, potato rolls, coconut flakes; Entrée: fiddlehead ferns, sablefish, vadouvan, blood orange sorbet; Dessert: sour beer, cherimoya, raspberries, brown bread in a can; Contestants: Shawn Fralin, Private Chef, Miami, FL (eliminated after the appetizer); Arthur Saks III, Executive Chef, Marina Cafe, Staten Island, NY (eliminated after the entrée); Sonia El-Nawal, Chef Consultant, New York, NY (eliminated after the dessert); Charles Lopez, Sous chef, Tastings Catering Company, New York, NY (winner)
107	11	"Class Acts"	Marc Murphy, Amanda Freitag, and Sam Kass	November 22, 2011
Ingredients: Appetizer: canned tuna fish, wonton wrappers, spinach, dill pickles; Entrée: collard greens, chicken breasts, anchovies, quinoa; Dessert: sunflower seeds, grapes, cream cheese, canned pineapple; Contestants: Rhonda Deloach, Head Chef / Food Service Director, Common Ground High School, New Haven, CT (eliminated after the appetizer); Arlene Leggio, Cook Manager, Islip High School, Islip, NY (eliminated after the entrée); Dianne Houlihan, Assistant Cook Manager, Great Neck Elementary School, Waterford, CT (eliminated after the dessert); Cheryl Barbara, Head Cook, High School in the Community, New Haven, CT (winner); Notes: The contestants in this episode are school cafeteria workers. Judge Sam Kass is an assistant chef in the White House as well a senior policy advisor on healthy food initiatives. This episode was part of a Food Network initiative with Share Our Strength to promote children's nutrition and to combat hunger in children.
108	12	"Yakety Yak, Yak, Yak"	Scott Conant, Geoffrey Zakarian, and Marcus Samuelsson	November 29, 2011
Ingredients: Appetizer: wax beans, mandarinquats, sardines, rice cakes; Entrée: mangosteens, mustard greens, dried shrimp, yak strip steaks; Dessert: black pepper crackers, plums, kefir, chamomile flowers; Contestants: Jill Nicolson, Caterer and Entrepreneur, Cuisine with Jill Nicolson, Torrington, CT (eliminated after the appetizer); Nicholas Porcelli, Executive Chef, Shhh, New York, NY (eliminated after the entrée); Kate Lee Squibb, Sous chef, 158 Café, South Portland, ME (eliminated after the dessert); Vinson Petrillo, Executive Sous chef, Caviar Russe, New York, NY (winner)
109	13	"Duck for Dinner"	Scott Conant, Alex Guarnaschelli, and Zakary Pelaccio	December 13, 2011
Ingredients: Appetizer: duck confit, red cherry peppers, frozen naan, vanilla beans; Entrée: duck breast, champagne mango, morel mushrooms, ranch dressing; Dessert: chocolate chips, chestnuts, dried strawberries, duck eggs; Contestants: Larry Baldwin, Executive Chef, David Burke Fromagerie, Rumson, NJ (eliminated after the appetizer); Megan Johnson, Executive Chef, Elsewhere / Casellula Cheese & Wine Café, New York, NY (eliminated after the entrée); Al Nappo, Executive Chef, Founding Farmers, Georgetown, DC (eliminated after the dessert); Neela Paniz, Chef and Restaurateur, Neela's, Napa, CA (winner); Notes: Each basket included an ingredient from a duck.

=== Season 10 (2011–12) ===
No. overall	No. in season	Title	Judges	Original release date
110	1	"The Big Scoop"	Chris Santos, Alex Guarnaschelli, and Marcus Samuelsson	December 20, 2011
Ingredients: Appetizer: boudin blanc, chanterelle mushrooms, baby artichokes, orange marmalade; Entrée: rainbow chard, tonic water, malanga coco, rabbit; Dessert: fino sherry, granola, dried persimmon, vanilla ice cream; Contestants: Joseph Arcarola, Chef, Highline Ballroom, New York, NY (eliminated after the appetizer); Jeremy Spector, Chef and Restaurateur, The Brindle Room, New York, NY (eliminated after the entrée); Holly Sheppard, Chef de cuisine, Silkstone Catering Events, New York, NY (eliminated after the dessert); Walter D'Rozario, Chef de cuisine, Junoon, New York, NY (winner)
111	2	"Chop on Through"	Scott Conant, Geoffrey Zakarian, and Marcus Samuelsson	January 3, 2012
Ingredients: Appetizer: wasabi root, blueberries, cocktail blinis, guanciale; Entrée: Bloody Mary mix, green seedless grapes, cashews, chicken steak; Dessert: cinnamon toast cereal, Asian pears, chocolate covered raisins, camembert; Contestants: Dave Ward, Executive Chef, Thomas Preti Catering, Long Island, NY (eliminated after the appetizer); Johnny McLaughlin, Chef and Restaurateur, Heartbreaking Dawns, Rosendale, NY (eliminated after the entrée); David Nichols, Executive Sous Chef, Landmarc Time Warner Center, New York, NY (eliminated after the dessert); Elise Kornack, Sous Chef, Aquavit, New York, NY (winner); Notes: Chef Nichols is a chef at Landmarc, owned by Chopped judge Marc Murphy.
112	3	"Far Far Out!"	Chris Santos, Alex Guarnaschelli, and Maneet Chauhan	January 10, 2012
Ingredients: Appetizer: Canadian bacon, roasted piquillo peppers, tomatillos, instant noodle soup; Entrée: cactus pears, squab, frozen lima beans, far far; Dessert: corn flakes cereal, sweet chili sauce, golden raspberries, labne; Contestants: David Seigal, Executive Chef, The Tangled Vine, New York, NY (eliminated after the appetizer); Faye Hess, Cooking Teacher and Blogger, "FayeFood" food blog, New York, NY (eliminated after the entrée); Joe Simon, Executive Sous Chef, David Burke Fromagerie, Rumson, NJ (eliminated after the dessert); Giorgio Rapicavoli, Executive Chef, 660 at the Angler's, Miami Beach, FL (winner)
113	4	"Frozen Fries with That?"	Chris Santos, Amanda Freitag, and Maneet Chauhan	January 17, 2012
Ingredients: Appetizer: cube steak, salsa, queso fresco, frozen french fries; Entrée: blue foot chicken, broccolini, tequila, dried limes; Dessert: white balsamic vinegar, chocolate-covered peanuts, dried cranberries, masa harina; Contestants: Ian Friedman, Executive Chef, Rainwater Grill, New York, NY (eliminated after the appetizer); Clark Barlowe, Sous chef, Clyde's Tower Oaks Lodge, Rockville, MD (eliminated after the entrée); Dan Giusti, Executive Chef, 1789 Restaurant, Washington, DC (eliminated after the dessert); Adrienne Grenier, Sous chef, 1500 Degrees, Miami Beach, FL (winner); Notes: At one time, Chef Barlowe used to work under Chef Giusti.
114	5	"Redemption Competition"	Chris Santos, Amanda Freitag, and Marc Murphy	January 24, 2012
Ingredients: Appetizer: sweetbreads, dried dates, red Malabar spinach, strawberry popsicles; Entrée: leg of lamb, kochujang, rainbow carrots, root beer schnapps; Dessert: fresh pasta sheets, plum tomatoes, basil, white chocolate; Contestants: Anna Maria Santorelli, Chef and Restaurateur, Anna Maria's, Larchmont, NY (Episode 6.4 – "Doughs and Don'ts") (eliminated after the appetizer); Michelle Firlit-Garcia, Pastry Chef, Bleeding Heart Bakery, Chicago, IL (Episode 8.7 – "Trick or Treat, Chicken Feet!") (eliminated after the entrée); Tryg Siverson, Chef and Restaurateur, Friedman's Lunch, New York, NY (Episode 7.1 – "The Icing on the Steak") (eliminated after the dessert); Sammy Davis Jr., Executive Chef, CR Lounge, Baltimore, MD (Episode 6.1 – "Victory on the Brain") (winner); Notes: This episode featured four past runners-up competing again for another chance at $10,000.
115	6	"On the Line"	Marc Murphy, Missy Robbins, and Aarón Sánchez	January 31, 2012
Ingredients: Appetizer: mahi-mahi, candy cane beets, verjus, olive loaf; Entrée: red mullet, peach palm fruit, haricots verts, licorice candy; Dessert: clove candies, loquats, kaiser rolls, cheese wedges; Contestants: (Germany) Marcus Lepke, Personal Chef, European Epicurean, Voorhees, NJ (eliminated after the appetizer); (United States) Dewey Losasso, Executive Chef, The Forge, Miami Beach, FL (eliminated after the entrée); (Israel) Ronit Penso, Private Chef and Author, New York, NY (eliminated after the dessert); (France) Sylvain Harribey, Executive Chef, Sofitel New York, New York, NY (winner); Notes: This episode featured three chefs born outside the US.
116	7	"Viewers' Choice!"	Geoffrey Zakarian, Alex Guarnaschelli, and Chris Santos	April 3, 2012
Ingredients: Appetizer: artichoke hearts, truffle honey, corn nuts, scrapple; Entrée: fenugreek, new potatoes, bison short ribs, cheese spread in a jar; Dessert: dried black licorice root, pork rinds, macadamia nuts, limoncello; Contestants: Amy Johnson, Private Chef, New York, NY (eliminated after the appetizer); Virginia Monaco, Chef, The Vanderbilt, Brooklyn, NY (eliminated after the entrée); Ian Muntzert, Chef de cuisine, Commonwealth, San Francisco, CA (eliminated after the dessert); Ivan Dorvil, Private Chef, Miami, FL (winner); Notes: This was the first viewers' choice episode. Fans of the show decided on the basket ingredients via an online poll.
117	8	"All-Stars: Iron Chefs Do Battle"	Scott Conant, Geoffrey Zakarian, and Aarón Sánchez	April 8, 2012
Ingredients: Appetizer: crawfish, lemon cucumber, purple wax beans, pre-cooked beef tendon; Entrée: octopus, dandelion greens, aged gouda, sour trahana; Dessert: plums, coconut rum, black beans, queso fresco; Contestants: Jose Garces (charity: St. Christopher's Foundation for Children – Philadelphia, PA) (eliminated after the appetizer); Cat Cora (charity: Chefs for Humanity – New York, NY) (eliminated after the entrée); Marc Forgione (charity: Feeding America – Chicago, IL) (eliminated after the dessert); Michael Symon (charity: Autism Speaks – New York, NY) (advances to final round) (winner); Notes: This was the first of a five-part series of episodes in which groups of chefs competed to win $50,000 for charity. This heat featured Iron Chefs from Iron Chef America.
118	9	"All-Stars: Prime Time vs. Day Time"	Geoffrey Zakarian, Amanda Freitag, and Aarón Sánchez	April 15, 2012
Ingredients: Appetizer: pancake mix, strawberry papaya, blue foot mushrooms, pre-cooked chicken feet; Entrée: maraschino cherries, peas in the pod, parsley root, tripe; Dessert: ostrich eggs, plantains, dried strawberries, galangal; Contestants: Keegan Gerhard (Food Network Challenge) (charity: Make-A-Wish Foundation – Phoenix, AZ) (eliminated after the appetizer); Aarti Sequeira (Aarti Party, The Next Food Network Star (Season 6)) (charity: Harvest Home – Santa Monica, CA) (eliminated after the entrée); Marcela Valladolid (Mexican Made Easy) (charity: Fundación Internacional de la Comunidad, A. C.- Tijuana, Mexico) (eliminated after the dessert); Jeffrey Saad (United Tastes of America, The Next Food Network Star (Season 5)) (charity: Alexandria House – Los Angeles, CA) (advances to final round) (winner); Notes: This is the second part of a five-part tournament featuring celebrity chefs competing for charity. This heat featured chefs who have hosted cooking shows on Food Network.
119	10	"All-Stars: Food Network Star Contestants"	Scott Conant, Amanda Freitag, and Aarón Sánchez	April 22, 2012
Ingredients: Appetizer: razor clams, breakfast radishes, green grape tomatoes, shrimp paste; Entrée: culotte steak, Okinawa sweet potatoes, turnips, strawberry leather; Dessert: mango chutney, white apricots, blue cornmeal, bacon bits; Contestants: Chris Nirschel (TNFNS season 7 eighth place) (charity: The Initiative to Educate Afghan Women) (eliminated after the appetizer); Justin Balmes (TNFNS season 7 eleventh place) (charity: SafePath Children's Advocacy Center – Marietta, GA) (eliminated after the entrée); Vic "Vegas" Moea (TNFNS season 7 third place) (charity: St. Jude's Ranch for Children – Boulder City, NV) (eliminated after the dessert); Penny Davidi (TNFNS season 7 seventh place) (charity: PATH Gramercy (People Assisting the Homeless) – Los Angeles, CA) (advances to final round) (winner); Notes: This is the third part of a five-part tournament featuring celebrity chefs competing for charity. This heat featured former contestants from season 7 of The Next Food Network Star.
120	11	"All-Stars: Judge Remix"	Geoffrey Zakarian, Amanda Freitag, and Aarón Sánchez	April 29, 2012
Ingredients: Appetizer: potato pancakes, purple kohlrabi, Korean melon, goat brains; Entrée: rack of Berkshire pork, kusa, grape molasses, preserved duck eggs; Dessert: cake flour, farmer's cheese, baby beets, cola; Contestants: Chris Santos (charity: Rett Syndrome Research Trust – Trumbull, CT) (eliminated after the appetizer); Marc Murphy (charity: City Harvest – New York, NY) (eliminated after the entrée); Alex Guarnaschelli (charity: St. Jude Children's Research Hospital – Memphis, TN) (eliminated after the dessert); Marcus Samuelsson (charity: C-Cap (Careers through Culinary Arts Program) – New York, NY) (advances to final round) (winner); Notes: This is the fourth part of a five-part tournament featuring celebrity chefs competing for charity. This heat featured Chopped judges, none of whom had competed in the season 6 All-Stars Tournament.
121	12	"All-Stars: Grand Finale"	Amanda Freitag, Chris Santos, and Anne Burrell	May 6, 2012
Ingredients: Appetizer: galia melon, Chinese okra, pistachios, beef heart; Entrée: rainbow chard, bonito, hard cider, couscous; Dessert: panforte, pancetta, pink currants, crème fraîche; Contestants: Michael Symon (charity: Autism Speaks – New York, NY) (eliminated after the appetizer); Penny Davidi (charity: PATH Gramercy (People Assisting the Homeless) – Los Angeles, CA) (eliminated after the entrée); Jeffrey Saad (charity: Alexandria House – Los Angeles, CA) (eliminated after the dessert); Marcus Samuelsson (charity: C-Cap (Careers through Culinary Arts Program) – New York, NY) (winner); Notes: This is the fifth part of a five-part tournament featuring celebrity chefs competing for charity. The winners of the four previous heats competed head to head for $50,000 for their charity. Michael Symon forgot a basket ingredient (Chinese okra) in the appetizer round, leading to his being eliminated. Marcus Samuelsson was the first Chopped judge to win Chopped.
122	13	"Grilltastic!"	Chris Santos, Elizabeth Karmel, and Marc Murphy	May 29, 2012
Ingredients: Appetizer: sweet tea vodka, Asian steamed buns, baby romanesco, extra-firm tofu; Entrée: wagyu rib-eye steaks, baby corn, watermelon, coleslaw dressing; Dessert: stout beer, empanada wrappers, peaches, marshmallow spread; Contestants: Sean Brasel, Executive Chef, Meat Market, Miami, FL (eliminated after the appetizer); Melissa Cookston, Professional Barbecue Competitor, Nesbit, MS (eliminated after the entrée); Richard Park, Chef and Entrepreneur, Cat Heads BBQ, San Francisco, CA (eliminated after the dessert); Jay Lippin, Executive Chef, Southern Hospitality BBQ, New York, NY (winner); Notes: This was a grilling-themed episode. The stovetops were outfitted with grill sheets and two other burners. In contrast to the previous two grilling-themed episodes, the ovens were kept on and the chefs were allowed to use them.

=== Season 11 (2012) ===
No. overall	No. in season	Title	Judges	Original release date
123	1	"I'm Your Huckleberry"	Scott Conant, Maneet Chauhan, and Seamus Mullen	February 7, 2012
Ingredients: Appetizer: huckleberries, black beans, green plantains, octopus; Entrée: champagne, skirt steak, yuca, coconut; Dessert: chicha morada, Cotija cheese, mangoes, shoestring potato sticks; Contestants: Jeff O'Neill, Executive Chef, The Villa by Barton G, Miami Beach, FL (eliminated after the appetizer); Frederik De Pue, Executive Chef, Smith Commons and 42˚ Catering, Washington, DC (eliminated after the entrée); Chai Trivedi, Sous chef, Buddakan, New York, NY (eliminated after the dessert); Reggie Anderson, Executive Pastry Chef, Landmarc Restaurants, New York, NY (winner); Notes: Chef O'Neill forgot his plantains in the appetizer leading to his elimination. Chef Anderson works at Landmarc, which is owned by Chopped judge Marc Murphy.
124	2	"Chewing the Caul Fat"	Scott Conant, Marcus Samuelsson, and Aarón Sánchez	February 14, 2012
Ingredients: Appetizer: sea scallops, guaje beans, aged cheddar, pickle juice; Entrée: black bass, raspberry lavender risotto, savoy cabbage, caul fat; Dessert: cosmopolitan mix, dried apples, biscotti, edible flowers; Contestants: Nancy Caballes, Private Chef, Montclair, NJ (eliminated after the appetizer); René Stein, Sous chef, Seasonal, New York, NY (eliminated after the entrée); Danni Bleil, Food Stylist, Ottsville, PA (eliminated after the dessert); Lester Walker, Executive Chef, Copia, New York, NY (winner)
125	3	"Good Chop, Bad Chop?"	Scott Conant, Zakary Pelaccio, and Aarón Sánchez	February 21, 2012
Ingredients: Appetizer: quail eggs, white asparagus, hibiscus flowers in syrup, canned spiced ham; Entrée: lake perch, tomatoes on the vine, avocados, rolled oats; Dessert: sour cherries, croissants, clotted cream, lemongrass; Contestants: Angela Karegeannes, Caterer, A Fork Full of Earth Organic Catering, Fairfax, CA (eliminated after the appetizer); Vaughn Crenshaw, Executive Sous chef, Khloe Bistrot, Fort Lee, NJ (eliminated after the entrée); Noureddine Elgheur, Caterer, Sweet Savories Catering, Brooklyn, NY (eliminated after the dessert); Justin Werner, Executive Sous Chef, Colicchio & Sons, New York, NY (winner)
126	4	"Leftovers Extravaganza!"	Chris Santos, Amanda Freitag, and Marcus Samuelsson	March 6, 2012
Ingredients: Appetizer: leftover pizza, leftover beer, graffiti eggplant, dried plums; Entrée: leftover pot roast, leftover steamed rice, escarole, 1/2 bottle of white wine (chardonnay); Dessert: leftover vanilla milkshake, leftover refried beans, butter crackers, kiwi; Contestants: Ryan McLaughlin, Chef de cuisine, The Vanderbilt, Brooklyn, NY (eliminated after the appetizer); Lee Farrington, Chef and Restaurateur, Figa, Portland, ME (eliminated after the entrée); Jeff Eng, Executive Chef, Clyde's Tower Oaks Lodge, Rockville, MD (eliminated after the dessert); Natalie Jacocks, Line Chef, Fette Sau, New York, NY (winner); Notes: This was a leftovers competition.
127	5	"Plenty of Fish"	Scott Conant, Geoffrey Zakarian, and Aarón Sánchez	March 13, 2012
Ingredients: Appetizer: amber ale, salmon fillets, frisée, kantola; Entrée: lutefisk, hazelnuts, pinot noir, dried lobster mushrooms; Dessert: baby eggplants, gooseberries, eggroll skins, lapchang; Contestants: Michael Jacobs, Food Consultant and Caterer, Miami Heat, Miami, FL (eliminated after the appetizer); Shanna Horner O’Hea, Chef and Innkeeper, The Kennebunk Inn / Academe Brasserie and Tavern, Kennebunk, ME (eliminated after the entrée); Anthony Ricco, Chef de cuisine, Spice Market Restaurant, New York, NY (eliminated after the dessert); Corwin Kave, Executive Chef, Fatty Crab / Fatty 'Cue, New York, NY / St. John, VI (winner)
128	6	"Sound the Alarm!"	Scott Conant, Alex Guarnaschelli, and Aarón Sánchez	March 20, 2012
Ingredients: Appetizer: smoked mozzarella, fresh pasta sheets, Rainier cherries, hot dogs; Entrée: fire roasted tomatoes, bison sirloin steaks, spinach, Italian hot peppers; Dessert: cinnamon-flavored candy coal, crescent roll dough, sour cream, hot chocolate mix; Contestants: Robert Painter, Sous Chef, Biagio's Osteria, Stratford, CT/ Engine 63, F.D.N.Y., New York, NY (eliminated after the appetizer); Walter Lewis, Chef / Engine 35, F.D.N.Y., New York, NY (eliminated after the entrée); Dan Gardner, Chef / Engine 15, F.D.N.Y., New York, NY (eliminated after the dessert); Paul Rut, Chef / Engine 262, F.D.N.Y., New York, NY (winner); Notes: The contestants consisted of four F.D.N.Y firefighters. The contestants wore T-shirts instead of the traditional Chopped chefs coats. Winner Paul Rut was awarded a Chopped chef's coat along with the prize money
129	7	"Ready, Set, Escargot!"	Marc Murphy, Zakary Pelaccio, and Aarón Sánchez	April 10, 2012
Ingredients: Appetizer: Asian long beans, red jalapeño peppers, calvados, escargots; Entrée: ground lamb, Stilton cheese, Chinese eggplant, birch syrup; Dessert: coconut water, garnet yams, Thai basil, roasted noodles; Contestants: John Deatcher, Caterer, Foodini's Catering, Neptune, NJ (eliminated after the appetizer); David Guas, Chef and Restaurateur, Bayou Bakery, Arlington, VA (eliminated after the entrée); Frank Whittaker, Executive Sous chef, Fishtail by David Burke, New York, NY (eliminated after the dessert); Missy Corey, Kitchen Manager, Duckfat, Portland, ME (winner)
130	8	"Own It!"	Chris Santos, Alex Guarnaschelli, and Marcus Samuelsson	April 17, 2012
Ingredients: Appetizer: injera, hearts of palm, mâche, rabbit escabeche; Entrée: goat chops, dragon's tongue beans, cinnamon schnapps, dark chocolate; Dessert: hollandaise sauce, strawberries, walnuts, blue corn tortilla chips; Contestants: Nelly Godfrey, Chef and Restaurateur, Lima's Taste, New York, NY (eliminated after the appetizer); Miguel Escobedo, Chef and Restaurateur, Papalote Mexican Grill, San Francisco, CA (eliminated after the entrée); Vito Facciabene, Chef and Restaurateur, Vibano's Trattoria, Bronx, NY (eliminated after the dessert); Kris Wessel, Chef and Restaurateur, Red Light, Miami, FL (winner); Notes: Chef Escobedo forgot the injera in the appetizer round, but was not eliminated.
131	9	"Yuzu Never Know"	Seamus Mullen, Amanda Freitag, and Missy Robbins	May 1, 2012
Ingredients: Appetizer: sturgeon filets, cucumber, yuzu juice, black mission figs; Entrée: mutton chops, baby leeks, banana potatoes, orange gelatin; Dessert: pasilla chiles, pineapple, Israeli couscous, Mexican chocolate; Contestants: Prasad Chirnomula, Executive Chef, Thali, New Haven, CT (eliminated after the appetizer); Fany Gerson, Pastry Chef, La Newyorkina, New York, NY (eliminated after the entrée); Zaina Dellaquila, Executive Chef, Condé Nast Cafe, New York NY (eliminated after the dessert); Kenneth Johnson, Executive Chef, Pescatore, New York, NY (winner)
132	10	"Reversal of Fortune"	Geoffrey Zakarian, Chris Santos, and Marcus Samuelsson	May 8, 2012
Ingredients: Appetizer: chicken livers, California raisins, heirloom tomatoes, green goddess dressing; Entrée: branzino, baby bok choy, celery soda, fortune cookies; Dessert: sourdough bread, dried figs, baby fennel, coffee beans; Contestants: Jessica North, Line Cook, St. Francis Fountain, San Francisco, CA (eliminated after the appetizer); William Bunn III, Caterer, Brooklyn, NY (eliminated after the entrée); Dimitri Voutsinas, Executive Sous chef, Water's Edge, Long Island City, NY (eliminated after the dessert); Jean-Louis Gerin, Chef and Restaurateur, Restaurant Jean-Louis, Greenwich, CT (winner)
133	11	"A Very Piggy Halloween"	Chris Santos, Amanda Freitag, and Marc Murphy	October 16, 2012
Ingredients: Appetizer: lacinato kale, finger lime, gummy tarantulas, pre-cooked pig snout; Entrée: calf's liver, sea beans, strawberry popping candy, dried ghost chiles; Dessert: puffed rice cereal bars, spiced rum, rambutan, tequila lollipops; Contestants: Pete Ascolese, Chef and Restaurateur, Hope and Anchor, Brooklyn, NY (eliminated after the appetizer); Kyle Bernstein, Culinary Instructor, New Hampton, NY (eliminated after the entrée); Brittanny Evans, Sous chef, Northern Spy Food Co., New York, NY (eliminated after the dessert); Sean Scotese, Freelance Chef, New York, NY (winner); Notes: This was a Halloween-themed episode.
134	12	"Happy Turkey Gizzards Day!"	Maneet Chauhan, Amanda Freitag, and Marc Murphy	November 13, 2012
Ingredients: Appetizer: cranberry sauce, cheese and green chile tamales, green beans, smoked turkey gizzards; Entrée: pumpkin pie, French-fried onions, dried oysters, turkey; Dessert: lavash, kumquats, mulling spices, chocolate turkeys; Contestants: Evelyn Cheatham, Chef and Instructor, W.O.W. (Worth Our Weight), Santa Rosa, CA (eliminated after the appetizer); Tim Cipriano, Director of Food Services, Guilford Public Schools, Guilford, CT (eliminated after the entrée); Jeremiah Bullfrog, Chef and Owner, gastroPod Mobile Gourmet, Miami, FL (eliminated after the dessert); Eddie Canlon, Chef and Restaurateur, Canlon's Restaurant, Staten Island, NY (winner); Notes: This was a Thanksgiving-themed episode. The chefs were directed to prepare holiday-themed dishes for each course. The chefs were given 40 minutes instead of the usual 30 in the entrée round to allow time to adequately butcher and cook the turkey.
135	13	"Chopping in a Winter Wonderland"	Geoffrey Zakarian, Alex Guarnaschelli, and Marc Murphy	November 25, 2012
Ingredients: Appetizer: baby mustard greens, spiral ham, pizzelle cookies, kugel; Entrée: roasted chestnuts, stone crabs, beef tenderloin, Santa Claus melon; Dessert: eggnog, panettone, pomegranate molasses, Hanukkah gelt; Contestants: Deborah Gelman, Executive Chef, NYU Law, New York, NY (eliminated after the appetizer); Kenny Minor, Private Chef, New York, NY (eliminated after the entrée); William Artley, Executive Chef, Evening Star Cafe, Alexandria, VA (eliminated after the dessert); Rachel Willen, Culinary Instructor, foodfix, Clinton, NJ (winner); Notes: This was a holiday-themed episode. The chefs were directed to prepare holiday-themed dishes for each course.

=== Season 12 (2012) ===
No. overall	No. in season	Title	Judges	Original release date
136	1	"Sunny Side Apps"	Aarón Sánchez, Amanda Freitag, and Maneet Chauhan	June 5, 2012
Ingredients: Appetizer: corned beef, gummy fried eggs, black olives, baby corn; Entrée: striped bass, sour lemon candy, Jerusalem artichokes, cream of mushroom soup; Dessert: spearmint leaf candy, knödel, almond flour, raisins on the vine; Contestants: Jesse Kramer, Chef and Restaurateur, Brooklyn Taco Co., New York, NY (eliminated after the appetizer); Brian Howard, Executive Chef, Comme Ça, Cosmopolitan of Las Vegas, Las Vegas, NV (eliminated after the entrée); Tony Kang, Sous chef, Brookville Country Club, Upper Brookville, NY (eliminated after the dessert); Cory Bahr, Chef and Restaurateur, Cotton, Monroe, LA (winner); Notes: Each basket included a type of candy.
137	2	"A Guts Reaction"	Geoffrey Zakarian, Amanda Freitag, and Marc Murphy	June 12, 2012
Ingredients: Appetizer: chicken intestines, red miso, Savoy cabbage, clementine oranges; Entrée: duck breast, red Malabar spinach, cherry cola, olive loaf; Dessert: kombucha, rambutan, egg white powder, candied nuts; Contestants: Kerenza Napoles, Sous chef, Dickie Brennan's Bourbon House, New Orleans, LA (eliminated after the appetizer); Robert Magsalin, Chef and Entrepreneur, Fükü Burger, Los Angeles, CA (eliminated after the entrée); Steve Luttrell, Chef de cuisine, La Silhouette, New York, NY (eliminated after the dessert); Fatima Ali, Sous chef, Café Centro, New York, NY (winner)
138	3	"Chocolate Challenge"	Marc Murphy, Alex Guarnaschelli, and Amanda Freitag	June 19, 2012
Ingredients: Appetizer: button mushrooms, dried dates, duck hearts, chocolate-covered cherries; Entrée: chateaubriand, rainbow carrots, escarole, chocolate wine; Dessert: marzipan, membrillo, ladyfingers, chocolate lips; Contestants: Taryn Mumpower, Baker, Pick Your Poison Bake Shop, Las Vegas, NV (eliminated after the appetizer); Richard Ingraham, Personal Chef, Atlanta, GA (eliminated after the entrée); Zach Meloy, Chef and Restaurateur, Push Start Kitchen, Atlanta, GA (eliminated after the dessert); Christina Olivarez, Executive Chef, Diego, Las Vegas, NV (winner); Notes: Each basket included a chocolate ingredient.
139	4	"Pride of New Orleans"	Marc Murphy, Alex Guarnaschelli, and Amanda Freitag	June 26, 2012
Ingredients: Appetizer: razor clams, andouille sausage, lime pickle, cajun chips; Entrée: catfish, chard, fig preserves, chai tea powder; Dessert: gin liqueur, huckleberries, beignet mix, chicory coffee; Contestants: Richard Bond, Chef and Culinary Instructor, Mardi Gras School of Cooking, New Orleans, LA (eliminated after the appetizer); Justin Kennedy, Chef, Parkway Bakery & Tavern, New Orleans, LA (eliminated after the entrée); Cody Monfra, Sous chef, Palace Cafe, New Orleans, LA (eliminated after the dessert); Linda Green, Caterer, Ms. Linda's Soul Food Catering, New Orleans, LA (winner); Notes: This episode featured four chefs from New Orleans with basket ingredients inspired by the New Orleans theme.
140	5	"All-American Competition"	Marc Murphy, Amanda Freitag, and Elizabeth Karmel	July 3, 2012
Ingredients: Appetizer: fried chicken, American cheese, spinach, apple pie; Entrée: Maine lobster, hot dogs, frozen lemonade, potato chips; Dessert: peaches, breakfast toaster pastries, bourbon whiskey, corn on the cob; Contestants: Kimberly Parris, Personal Chef and Caterer, K. Parris Catering & Personal Chef Service, New York, NY (eliminated after the appetizer); Mary Rusch, Chef and Restaurateur, Hash House, Las Vegas, NV (eliminated after the entrée); Steve Overlay, Chef and Executive Pitmaster, Memphis Championship Barbecue, Las Vegas, NV (eliminated after the dessert); Mike Gowland, Chef and Firefighter, Manning's Eat-Drink-Cheer, New Orleans, LA (winner); Notes: Each basket contained American staple-themed ingredients in honor of the 4th of July.
141	6	"Orzo It Seemed"	Geoffrey Zakarian, Alex Guarnaschelli, and Amanda Freitag	July 17, 2012
Ingredients: Appetizer: pink grapefruit, seafood sausage, wasabi peas, cream of coconut; Entrée: clove liqueur, bistec norteno, butternut squash, orzo; Dessert: red jalapeños, shortbread cookies, sharon fruit, cream cheese frosting; Contestants: Alex Friedman, Chef and Restaurateur, P'cheen International Bistro and Pub, Atlanta, GA (eliminated after the appetizer); Brigeth Brookins, Sous chef, Banquets Department at the Cosmopolitan, Las Vegas, NV (eliminated after the entrée); Willie Box, Executive Chef, 793 Juniper, Atlanta, GA (eliminated after the dessert); Joe Rego, Executive Chef, Club Opera, Atlanta, GA (winner)
142	7	"Belly Dance!"	Chris Santos, Maneet Chauhan, and Claudia Fleming	July 31, 2012
Ingredients: Appetizer: tuna belly, dandelion greens, canned chickpeas, dates; Entrée: lamb top round, rutabagas, carrot jam, grenadine; Dessert: arak, canned pumpkin, amaretti cookies, cayenne pepper; Contestants: Michael Chen, Executive Sous chef, Yellowtail Japanese Restaurant & Lounge, Las Vegas, NV (eliminated after the appetizer); Danushka Lysek, Private Chef and Model, New York, NY (eliminated after the entrée); Ryan Bartlow, Chef de cuisine, Frankies 570, New York, NY (eliminated after the dessert); Matt Murphy, Executive Chef, The Irish House, New Orleans, LA (winner)
143	8	"Cake Walk?"	Geoffrey Zakarian, Chris Santos, and Aarón Sánchez	August 7, 2012
Ingredients: Appetizer: carrot cake, baby fennel, kumquats, kosher shrimp; Entrée: cardoons, chanterelle mushrooms, pickled green beans, turkey burgers; Dessert: caramel popcorn, red plums, prosecco, udon noodles; Contestants: Monique Barrow, Sous chef, Murphy's, Atlanta, GA (eliminated after the appetizer); Beni Velazquez, Chef and Restaurateur, Bar and Bistro, Las Vegas, NV (eliminated after the entrée); Carla Contreras, Private Chef and Owner, Red Clog Kitchen, New York, NY (eliminated after the dessert); Zeb Stevenson, Executive Chef, Livingston Restaurant and Bar, Atlanta, GA (winner)
144	9	"Oui, Oui, Confit"	Geoffrey Zakarian, Alex Guarnaschelli, and Marc Murphy	August 14, 2012
Ingredients: Appetizer: duck confit, unripe mangoes, couscous, red carrots; Entrée: peanut butter, pork tenderloin, okra, canned shrimp; Dessert: grape jelly beans, buttermilk, wonton wrappers, sweet potatoes; Contestants: Bryon Peck, Chef and Restaurateur, Elizabeth's Restaurant, New Orleans, LA (eliminated after the appetizer); Maria Velez, Chef and Restaurateur, Mojito Cuban Cuisine, Brooklyn, NY (eliminated after the entrée); John Simmons, Chef and Restaurateur, Firefly Tapas Kitchen and Bar, Las Vegas, NV (eliminated after the dessert); Franco Barrio, Chef and Restaurateur, Caliu, New York, NY (winner); Notes: Chef Peck forgot his carrots in Round 1. However, he did use the carrots in the water for his couscous, but was still eliminated because the judges couldn't taste them. In Round 2 Chef Velez cut her finger twice and she had to restart her dish.
145	10	"Drawing a Flank"	Chris Santos, Maneet Chauhan, and Marcus Samuelsson	August 21, 2012
Ingredients: Appetizer: black licorice, Arctic char, mangos, caperberries; Entrée: flank steak, sour cherries, espresso powder, crosnes; Dessert: polenta, Pedro Ximénez sherry, beets, whipped topping; Contestants: Jude Huval, Executive Chef, Pat's Fisherman's Wharf, Henderson, LA (eliminated after the appetizer); Frances Tariga, Private Chef, United Nations, New York, NY (eliminated after the entrée); Rick Giffen, Executive Chef, Stratosphere Las Vegas, Las Vegas, NV (eliminated after the dessert); Quentin Donnaud, Executive Chef, Coast Seafood & Raw Bar, Atlanta, GA (winner); Notes: In Round 1, Chef Huval forgot the caperberries, leading to his elimination. In Round 2, Chef Giffen was caught plating after time was called.
146	11	"A Bunny Thing Happened"	Marc Murphy, Alex Guarnaschelli, and Amanda Freitag	September 11, 2012
Ingredients: Appetizer: conch, sugared marshmallow candies, peas in the pod, prepared horseradish; Entrée: chocolate bunny, lamb breast, aleppo pepper, spring garlic; Dessert: babka, rhubarb, baby bananas, Beaumes de Venise; Contestants: Chuck Subra, Executive Chef, JW Marriott New Orleans, New Orleans, LA (eliminated after the appetizer); Mihoko Obunai, Freelance Chef, Atlanta, GA (eliminated after the entrée); Zoe Feigenbaum, Chef and Restaurateur, Zoë, New York, NY (eliminated after the dessert); Andrew Scurlock, Kitchen Manager, St. James Cheese Company, New Orleans, LA (winner); Notes: Each basket contained an Easter-themed ingredient.
147	12	"Charge!"	Chris Santos, Alex Guarnaschelli, and Aarón Sánchez	October 9, 2012
Ingredients: Appetizer: Korean-style short ribs, canned spaghetti, purple artichokes, baby pineapples; Entrée: tilefish, hot German mustard, pimento cheese, cape gooseberries; Dessert: honey flavored cereal, soy sauce, anjou pears, cocktail franks; Contestants: Jennifer Iserloh, Private Chef and Author, Secrets of a Skinny Chef food blog, Hoboken, NJ (eliminated after the appetizer); Chris DeBarr, Chef and Restaurateur, The Green Goddess / Serendipity, New Orleans, LA (eliminated after the entrée); Gason Nelson, Private Chef, Full of Flavor, New Orleans, LA (eliminated after the dessert); Scott Pajak, Chef de cuisine, Lagasse's Stadium at the Palazzo Resort, Las Vegas, NV (winner)
148	13	"For Sake's Sake"	Chris Santos, Amanda Freitag, and Marc Murphy	November 20, 2012
Ingredients: Appetizer: ostrich tenderloin, Anzac biscuits, cauliflower, pork rinds; Entrée: sablefish, pomegranates, sake, graffiti eggplant; Dessert: lime curd, cactus pear, candied orange slices, hot dog buns; Contestants: Cam Boudreaux, Sous chef, The Green Goddess, New Orleans, LA (eliminated after the appetizer); Tasheena Butler, Chef and Caterer, T. Marie's Kitchen & Catering, New Orleans, LA (eliminated after the entrée); Derek Gigliotti, Executive Chef, Onda Ristorante, Mirage Resort, Las Vegas, NV (eliminated after the dessert); Ria Pell, Chef and Restaurateur, Ria's Bluebird / Sauced, Atlanta, GA (winner); Notes: Chef Boudreaux cut himself at the end of the appetizer round and forgot to plate two ingredients because he was being bandaged, and he was eliminated.

=== Season 13 (2012–13) ===
No. overall	No. in season	Title	Judges	Original release date
149	1	"Stacking Up"	Scott Conant, Geoffrey Zakarian, and Aarón Sánchez	September 4, 2012
Ingredients: Appetizer: jumbo shrimp, yellowfoot chanterelle mushrooms, lapchang, gingerbread syrup; Entrée: slipper shells, taro root, Asian long beans, quail; Dessert: frozen pancakes, tamarind paste, farmer's cheese, orange sherbet; Contestants: Sheridan Su, Chef and Restaurateur, Great Bao Café, Las Vegas, NV (eliminated after the appetizer); Sung Kim, Private Chef, New York, NY (eliminated after the entrée); Vincent Contreras, Chef de cuisine, Las Vegas, NV (eliminated after the dessert); Gianfranco Franzese, Chef and Restaurateur, Pasticceria Bruno, Staten Island, NY (winner)
150	2	"Class Acts, Too"	Scott Conant, Alex Guarnaschelli, and Sam Kass	September 25, 2012
Ingredients: Appetizer: ground turkey, broccoli, raw pepitas, frozen yogurt; Entrée: pork tenderloin, sweet potatoes, rainbow chard, hoisin sauce; Dessert: corn flakes, carrots, skim milk, blueberries; Contestants: Terry Accaira, Head Cook and Nutritionist, Avery/Parsons Elementary School, Buena Vista, CO (eliminated after the appetizer); Shannon Solomon, Cook Manager, William C. Hinkley High School, Aurora, CO (eliminated after the entrée); Lynette Thomas, Head Cook, St. Martinville Primary School, St. Martinville, LA (eliminated after the dessert); Cindy Tinnel, Cook, Henry C. Maxwell Elementary School, Nashville, TN (winner); Notes: This episode featured four school cafeteria cooks. The three cooks who were chopped each received $5,000, and all four competitors, along with the four cooks from the first "Class Acts" episode, were invited by Sam Kass to the White House to meet its chefs and tour its garden.
151	3	"No Kidding!"	Chris Santos, Alex Guarnaschelli, and Marcus Samuelsson	October 2, 2012
Ingredients: Appetizer: gummy bacon, salmon fillets, frozen lima beans, lemon sorbet; Entrée: cotton candy, chicken cutlets, Brussels sprouts, French-fried onions; Dessert: zucchini, chocolate cake mix, crème fraîche, movie theatre popcorn; Contestants: Romilly Newman (age 13), from New York, NY (eliminated after the appetizer); Joel Allette (age 17), from New York, NY (eliminated after the entrée); Noah Museles (age 16), from Washington, D.C. (eliminated after the dessert); Shania Thomas (age 17), from New York, NY (winner); Notes: This is the first episode to feature teenage competitors. The contestants were given 30 minutes instead of the usual 20 in the appetizer round. The three eliminated teenagers each received a $1,000 gift certificate to Food Network's online store.
152	4	"Pigging Out!"	Aarón Sánchez, Alex Guarnaschelli, and Marcus Samuelsson	October 23, 2012
Ingredients: Appetizer: pig's head, fava beans, strawberries, Roquefort blue cheese; Entrée: pig organs, fiddlehead ferns, morel mushrooms, bourbon cream liqueur; Dessert: pig tails, dragon fruit, sorghum flour, lard; Contestants: Terry Koval, Chef and Restaurateur, Farm Burger, Atlanta, GA (eliminated after the appetizer); Nicole Brisson, Executive Chef, Carnevino at the Palazzo Resort, Las Vegas, NV (eliminated after the entrée); Robert Finn, Chef de cuisine, Fatty Crab, New York, NY (eliminated after the dessert); Hugh Mangum, Executive Chef and Owner, Mighty Quinn's, New York, NY (winner); Notes: This was a "nose-to-tail" themed competition. The pig organs in the entrée round consisted of heart, liver, and kidneys, and the chefs were required to use all three of them.
153	5	"Unsung Heroes"	Scott Conant, Alex Guarnaschelli, and Chris Santos	November 6, 2012
Ingredients: Appetizer: bangers, apple chips, asparagus, chocolate-covered almonds; Entrée: venison tenderloin, hamantashen, cola, cauliflower; Dessert: marshmallow spread, balsamic vinegar, ancho chiles, almond butter cookies; Contestants: Tony Biggs, Director of Culinary Operations, Second Harvest Food Bank, New Orleans, LA (eliminated after the appetizer); Linda Miles, Chef and Manager, Chapel Manor Senior Health Care Center / Philabundance, Philadelphia, PA (eliminated after the entrée); Keith Lucas, Executive Chef, Manna, Philadelphia, PA (eliminated after the dessert); Grace Lichaa, Manager, Capital Area Food Bank, Washington, D.C. (winner); Notes: This episode featured four "unsung heroes": people who volunteer in their communities.
154	6	"Bird in the Pan"	Scott Conant, Marco Canora, and Marcus Samuelsson	November 27, 2012
Ingredients: Appetizer: chicory, Ethiopian coffee beans, petite bananas, lamb fries; Entrée: Cornish hens, baby beets, celeriac, blueberry balsamic vinegar; Dessert: chickpea flour, raspberries, ricotta salata, rose water syrup; Contestants: Giancarlo Autenzio, Executive Chef, The Astor Room, Queens, NY (eliminated after the appetizer); Brack May, Chef and Restaurateur, Cowbell, New Orleans, LA (eliminated after the entrée); Virginia Willis, Chef and Author, Atlanta, GA (eliminated after the dessert); Tabb Singleton, Sous chef, Nola, New Orleans, LA (winner)
155	7	"Thirsty for Victory"	Scott Conant, Lee Anne Wong, and Marcus Samuelsson	December 11, 2012
Ingredients: Appetizer: ice cream cones, lump crab meat, baby turnips, pickled ginger; Entrée: city chicken, canned peaches, mustard greens, fruit punch-flavored sports drink; Dessert: carob syrup, spaghetti squash, figs, walnuts; Contestants: Greg Grossman, Student at Professional Children's School, New York, NY (eliminated after the appetizer); Jeremy Langlois, Executive Chef, Houmas House Plantation and Gardens, Darrow, LA (eliminated after the entrée); Leslie Parks, Freelance Caterer, New York, NY (eliminated after the dessert); Phil Crispo, Assistant Culinary Professor, Culinary Institute of America, Hyde Park, NY (winner); Notes: Greg Grossman was 16 years old at the time he competed, making him the youngest chef to appear on Chopped outside the special "teen chefs" episodes.
156	8	"Trout Bout"	Scott Conant, Alex Guarnaschelli, and Chris Santos	December 18, 2012
Ingredients: Appetizer: brook trout, rhubarb, dried strawberries, lemon verbena; Entrée: Scottish red-legged partridge, peanut butter taffy, lacinato kale, red curry paste; Dessert: dulce de leche, pineapple, sesame seed buns, apricot paste; Contestants: Courtney Renn, Personal Chef, Chef Courtney, Atlanta, GA (eliminated after the appetizer); Jimmy Tessier, Chef de cuisine, Bacio, Tropicana Las Vegas Hotel and Resort, Las Vegas, NV (eliminated after the entrée); Akiko Thurnauer, Chef and Restaurateur, Family Recipe, New York, NY (eliminated after the dessert); Nathanial Zimet, Chef and Restaurateur, Boucherie, New Orleans, LA (winner)
157	9	"Belly Up"	Scott Conant, Amanda Freitag, and Jet Tila	January 1, 2013
Ingredients: Appetizer: red mullet, shishito peppers, watercress, hot cocoa mix; Entrée: pork belly, artichokes, cherrystone clams, baby apples in syrup; Dessert: acorn squash, orange sherbet pops, sour cream, wheatgrass; Contestants: April Neujean, Lead Teacher, The Edible Schoolyard, New Orleans, LA (eliminated after the appetizer); Chris Sell, Chef and Restaurateur, Chipshop, Brooklyn, NY (eliminated after the entrée); Danny Lachs, Chef and Restaurateur, Tortaria, New York, NY (eliminated after the dessert); Flannery Klette-Kolton, Caterer, Big Little Get Together, New York, NY (winner); Notes: In the entrée round, Chef Sell dropped his pork belly on the floor, but put it on the plate. The judges did not taste that part of his dish.
158	10	"Hecho en the Chopped Kitchen"	Chris Santos, Aarón Sánchez, and Marc Murphy	February 7, 2013
Ingredients: Appetizer: pig's feet in a jar, tres leches cake, jicama, culantro; Entrée: goat chops, churros, tequila, huitlacoche; Dessert: whole coconuts, pepitas, piloncillo, yucca; Contestants: Mike Minor, Executive Chef, Border Grill at Mandalay Bay, Las Vegas, NV (eliminated after the appetizer); Saul Ortiz-Cruz, Executive Chef, Tacos & Tequila at the Luxor, Las Vegas, NV (eliminated after the entrée); Mia Castro, Chef de partie, Las Vegas, NV (eliminated after the dessert); Royden Ellamar, Executive Chef, Sensi at the Bellagio, Las Vegas, NV (winner); Notes: This episode featured Latin-themed ingredients.
159	11	"Make No Mistake"	Geoffrey Zakarian, Amanda Freitag, and Chris Santos	February 17, 2013
Ingredients: Appetizer: pulpo, chioggia beets, fava beans, pickled garlic; Entrée: wild boar roast, sweet potato chips, nopales, acai berry juice; Dessert: tangerines, cranberry sauce, chocolate chip cookies, gorgonzola dolce; Contestants: Marja Samsom, Caterer, New York, NY (Episode 5.11 – "Fright Bites") (eliminated after the appetizer); Monica Langowski, Private Chef, Chicago, IL (Episode 7.2 – "Canned Cheese, Please!") (eliminated after the entrée); John Sierp, Chef, New York, NY (Episode 3.9 – "Winging It") (eliminated after the dessert); Gwen LePape, Executive Chef, New York, NY (Episode 1.8 – "Coconut, Calamari, Donuts") (winner); Notes: This episode featured chefs who were eliminated in previous episodes for making egregious mistakes. Unlike past redemption episodes, fans chose the competitors they wanted to see come back, via an online poll.
160	12	"Untrained, Undaunted"	Scott Conant, Alex Guarnaschelli, and Marc Murphy	February 26, 2013
Ingredients: Appetizer: pickled watermelon rind, sushi platter, kohlrabi, bacon bits; Entrée: ostrich fan filets, purple asparagus, fish roe in a tube, blueberry wine; Dessert: cinnamon chips, baby red grapes, earl grey tea leaves, pound cake; Contestants: Adrian Ashby, Administrative Assistant from Queens, NY (eliminated after the appetizer); Maureen Sanchez, Homemaker from Oswego, IL (eliminated after the entrée); Michael Press, President of Textile by Elizabeth and James Jeans from White Plains, NY (eliminated after the dessert); Kevin Rooney, Mayor of Wyckoff, NJ (winner)

=== Season 14 (2013) ===
No. overall	No. in season	Title	Judges	Original release date
161	1	"Leftovers Overload"	Marc Murphy, Amanda Freitag, and Maneet Chauhan	January 6, 2013
Ingredients: Appetizer: matzo ball soup, macaroni and cheese, fried onion blossom, submarine sandwich; Entrée: rib-eye steak, mashed potatoes, ketchup packets, Greek salad; Dessert: ice cream sundae, old bananas, stale tortilla chips, cola; Contestants: Shawn Smilie, Executive Chef, The Buffet at Aria, Las Vegas, NV (eliminated after the appetizer); Jason Robertson, Caterer, Headwaters Café, New Orleans, LA (eliminated after the entrée); Nealy Frentz, Chef and Restaurateur, Lola, Covington, LA (eliminated after the dessert); Gerald Chin, Chef de Cuisine, The Cosmopolitan Las Vegas, Las Vegas, NV (winner); Notes: The ingredients used in this episode were leftovers.
162	2	"Chopped Champions: Part 1"	Geoffrey Zakarian, Alex Guarnaschelli, and Chris Santos	January 15, 2013
Ingredients: Appetizer: canned haggis, smoked gouda, celery, prunes; Entrée: fish heads, hon-shimeji mushrooms, crema, sugar cookie dough; Dessert: spiral ham, green plantains, water chestnuts, spiced rum; Contestants: Lish Steiling, Assistant Food Stylist, Today, New York, NY (Episode 9.8 – "Make A Splash!") (eliminated after the appetizer); Sylvain Harribey, Executive Chef, Sofitel, New York, New York, NY (Episode 10.6 – "On the Line") (eliminated after the entrée); Sean Scotese, Freelance Chef, New York, NY (Episode 11.11 – "A Very Piggy Halloween") (eliminated after the dessert); Kenneth Johnson, Executive Chef, Pescatore, New York, NY (Episode 11.9 – "Yuzu Never Know") (advances to final round) (winner); Notes: This was the first of a five-part series of episodes, where sixteen past champions competed. The winner of each preliminary round advanced to the finale, where they competed for $50,000. The fish heads used in the entrée round were striped bass.
163	3	"Chopped Champions: Part 2"	Scott Conant, Amanda Freitag, and Aarón Sánchez	January 22, 2013
Ingredients: Appetizer: fruitcake, shad roe, vodka, Tokyo scallions; Entrée: squab, peanut butter and jelly, red quinoa, karela; Dessert: mitmita, sauternes, cream-filled snack cakes, cottage cheese; Contestants: Rachel Willen, Chef and Culinary Instructor, Foodfix, Clinton, NJ (Episode 11.13 – "Chopping in a Winter Wonderland") (eliminated after the appetizer); Fatima Ali, Sous chef, Café Centro, New York, NY † (Episode 12.2 – "A Guts Reaction") (eliminated after the entrée); Walter D'Rozario, Chef de cuisine, Junoon, New York, NY (Episode 10.1 – "The Big Scoop") (eliminated after the dessert); Vinson Petrillo, Executive Sous chef, Caviar Russe, New York, NY (Episode 9.12 – "Yakety Yak Yak Yak") (advances to final round) (winner); Notes: This is the second of a five-part tournament where sixteen past champions competed. Chef Ali cut her finger badly in the entree round; while being treated her squab overcooked, and she was late starting her quinoa, leading to her elimination.
164	4	"Chopped Champions: Part 3"	Scott Conant, Maneet Chauhan, and Geoffrey Zakarian	January 29, 2013
Ingredients: Appetizer: smoked eel, cream cheese spread, quince paste, haricots verts; Entrée: frog legs, yuzu marmalade, gin, firm tofu; Dessert: jackfruit, araucana eggs, coconut macaroons, chocolate covered pretzels; Contestants: Lester Walker, Sous chef, Copia, New York, NY (Episode 11.2 – "Chewing the Caul Fat") (eliminated after the appetizer); Corwin Kave, Executive Chef, Fatty Crab / Fatty 'Cue, New York, NY / St. John, VI (Episode 11.5 – "Plenty of Fish") (eliminated after the entrée); Elise Kornack, Chef and Entrepreneur, Aquavit, New York, NY (Episode 10.2 – "Chop on Through") (eliminated after the dessert); Jun Tanaka, Executive Chef, Pearl Restaurant, London, England (Episode 8.1 – "Easy Peasy?") (advances to final round) (winner); Notes: This is the third of a five-part tournament where sixteen past champions competed.
165	5	"Chopped Champions: Part 4"	Aarón Sánchez, Alex Guarnaschelli, and Amanda Freitag	February 5, 2013
Ingredients: Appetizer: sour apple martini mix, mortadella, white asparagus, fennel; Entrée: calf's liver, fava greens, honey wine, halloumi; Dessert: maraschino cherries, Greek yogurt, canned espresso, corn nuts; Contestants: Kris Wessel, Chef and Restaurateur, Red Light, Miami, FL (Episode 11.8 – "Own It!") (eliminated after the appetizer); Helen Park, Executive Chef, New York, NY (Episode 9.6 – "Time & Space") (eliminated after the entrée); Jean-Louis Gerin, Chef and Restaurateur, Restaurant Jean-Louis, Greenwich, CT (Episode 11.10 – "Reversal of Fortune") (eliminated after the dessert); Rob Evans, Chef and Restaurateur, Hugo's / Duckfat, Portland, ME (Episode 9.7 – "Everything's Rosy") (advances to final round) (winner); Notes: This is the fourth five-part tournament where sixteen past champions competed.
166	6	"Chopped Champions: Finale"	Geoffrey Zakarian, Alex Guarnaschelli, and Amanda Freitag	February 12, 2013
Ingredients: Appetizer: pig ears, ramps, pine nuts, apple strudel; Entrée: abalone, curry leaves, serrano ham, amaranth grain; Dessert: carrot juice, almond flour, candied ginger, honeycomb; Contestants: Kenneth Johnson, Executive Chef, Pescatore, New York, NY (Episode 11.9 – "Yuzu Never Know") (eliminated after the appetizer); Vinson Petrillo, Executive Sous chef, Caviar Russe, New York, NY (Episode 9.12 – "Yakety Yak Yak Yak") (eliminated after the entrée); Rob Evans, Chef and Restaurateur, Hugo's / Duckfat, Portland, ME (Episode 9.7 – "Everything's Rosy") (eliminated after the dessert); Jun Tanaka, Executive Chef, Pearl Restaurant, London, England (Episode 8.1 – "Easy Peasy?") (winner); Notes: This is the final part of a five-part tournament where sixteen past champions competed. This episode's winner received $50,000.
167	7	"Just for the Halibut"	Marc Murphy, Lee Anne Wong, and Scott Conant	March 12, 2013
Ingredients: Appetizer: black radishes, smoked beef tongue, garbanzo beans, Italian anchovies; Entrée: halibut, aquavit, Chinese spinach, Mexican chorizo; Dessert: banana chips, sugar cane, almond butter, umeboshi; Contestants: Anne Churchill, Caterer & Tour Chef, New Orleans, LA (eliminated after the appetizer); Stephan Bogardus, Chef de cuisine, The North Fork Table & Inn, Southold, NY (eliminated after the entrée); Jamie Adams, Executive Chef, Veni Vidi Vici, Atlanta, GA (eliminated after the dessert); Steve Benjamin, Executive Chef, L'Atelier de Joël Robuchon, Las Vegas, NV (winner)
168	8	"Redemption Intention"	Marc Murphy, Alex Guarnaschelli, and Amanda Freitag	March 19, 2013
Ingredients: Appetizer: sea cucumber, enokitake mushrooms, white balsamic vinegar, rotisserie chicken; Entrée: duck tongue, pineapple, chestnuts, pork shoulder; Dessert: zucchini blossoms, dry roasted peanuts, anise liqueur, mamey; Contestants: Tony Kang, Sous Chef, Upper Brookville, NY (Episode 12.1 – "Sunny Side Apps") (eliminated after the appetizer); Vito Facciabene, Chef, Bronx, NY (Episode 11.8 – "Own It!") (eliminated after the entrée); Kate Lee Squibb, Sous Chef, South Portland, ME (Episode 9.12 – "Yakety Yak Yak Yak") (eliminated after the dessert); Cara Thompson, Sous Chef, Miami, FL (Episode 8.2 – "Ladies First!") (winner); Notes: This episode featured four past runners-up returning for a second chance to win.
169	9	"Chopped All-Stars: Food Network vs. Cooking Channel"	Geoffrey Zakarian, Maneet Chauhan, and Chris Santos	April 7, 2013
Ingredients: Appetizer: banana bread, veggie terrine, galangal, mango juice; Entrée: rack of venison, potato pierogies, okra, seafood pepper pot soup; Dessert: Okinawan sweet potatoes, coconut flakes, calvados, marshmallows; Contestants: Nadia G. (charity: Club Tech, The Boys & Girls Club of America) (eliminated after the appetizer); Gabriele Corcos (charity: Feeding America) (eliminated after the entrée); Jeff Mauro (charity: University of Chicago Medicine Comer Children's Hospital) (eliminated after the dessert); Sunny Anderson (charity: N Street Village) (advances to final round) (winner); Notes: This is the first round of a five-part charity tournament featuring groups of chefs playing for charity. The winner will receive $50,000 for their charity. This heat featured two Food Network personalities and two Cooking Channel personalities.
170	10	"Chopped All-Stars: Mega Chefs"	Chris Santos, Maneet Chauhan, and Marcus Samuelsson	April 14, 2013
Ingredients: Appetizer: black sea bass, wakame, cream soda, black garlic; Entrée: precooked oxtail, labneh in olive oil, mustard greens, fruit cocktail; Dessert: peanut brittle, Mexican chocolate, grape tomatoes, sponge cake snacks; Contestants: Chuck Hughes (charity: Cedars Cancer Institute) (eliminated after the appetizer); Elizabeth Falkner (charity: Edible Schoolyard Project) (eliminated after the entrée); Richard Blais (charity: Alliance for a Healthier Generation) (eliminated after the dessert); Gavin Kaysen (charity: Children's Cancer Research Fund) (advances to final round) (winner); Notes: This is the second round of a five-part charity tournament. This heat featured celebrity chefs.
171	11	"Chopped All-Stars: Judges"	Geoffrey Zakarian, Marcus Samuelsson, and Aarón Sánchez	April 21, 2013
Ingredients: Appetizer: diver scallops, harissa, pink grapefruit, speck; Entrée: capon, ramps, canned pizza sauce, burrata; Dessert: ruby port, olive oil gelato, dried apricots, French toast sticks; Contestants: Marc Murphy (charity: Share Our Strength) (eliminated after the appetizer); Alex Guarnaschelli (charity: Alex's Lemonade Stand) (eliminated after the entrée); Amanda Freitag (charity: God's Love We Deliver) (eliminated after the dessert); Scott Conant (charity: Keep Memory Alive) (advances to final round) (winner); Notes: This is the third round of a five-part charity tournament. This heat featured Chopped judges.
172	12	"Chopped All-Stars: Celebrities"	Geoffrey Zakarian, Maneet Chauhan, and Marcus Samuelsson	April 28, 2013
Ingredients: Appetizer: vanilla cupcakes, chicken tenders, avocados, kochujang; Entrée: skirt steak, matzo crackers, sweet orange gelatin cups, collard greens; Dessert: circus peanuts, passion fruit purée, graham cracker cereal, curry powder; Contestants: Judy Gold (charity: Project A.L.S.) (eliminated after the appetizer); Johnny Weir (charity: Human Rights Campaign Foundation) (eliminated after the entrée); Joey Fatone (charity: The Fatone Family Foundation) (eliminated after the dessert); Laila Ali (charity: Healthy Child Healthy World) (advances to final round) (winner); Notes: This is the fourth round of a five-part charity tournament. This heat featured celebrities from television, music, and sports.
173	13	"Chopped All-Stars: Finale!"	Geoffrey Zakarian, Aarón Sánchez, and Marcus Samuelsson	May 5, 2013
Ingredients: Appetizer: soft-shell crabs, crunchy peanut butter, sake, sea beans; Entrée: suckling goat, broccoli rabe, farro, cheddar filled pretzels; Dessert: freeze dried grapes, marrow bones, Marcona almonds, cannoli cream; Contestants: Sunny Anderson (charity: N Street Village) (eliminated after the appetizer); Laila Ali (charity: Healthy Child Healthy World) (eliminated after the entrée); Gavin Kaysen (charity: Children's Cancer Research Fund) (eliminated after the dessert); Scott Conant (charity: Keep Memory Alive) (winner); Notes: This is the final part of a five-part charity tournament where winners of the previous four episodes battle to win $50,000 for their charity. The entrée cooking time was extended to 40 minutes to allow the chefs to butcher the goat.

=== Season 15 (2013) ===
No. overall	No. in season	Title	Judges	Original release date
174	1	"Heads Up!"	Scott Conant, Amanda Freitag, and Aarón Sánchez	April 2, 2013
Ingredients: Appetizer: microwavable chocolate cake, baby tatsoi, artichoke liqueur, lamb's head; Entrée: Arctic char, concentrated vinegar, smoked butter, purple spinach; Dessert: yellow rice, persimmons, sugar cane drink, pine nuts; Contestants: Ingrid Wright, Sous chef, Exchange Alley, New York, NY (eliminated after the appetizer); Eleanor Wolper, Executive Chef, New York, NY (eliminated after the entrée); Jordan Andino, Executive Chef, SideBAR, New York, NY (eliminated after the dessert); Bruce Kalman, Executive Chef, The Churchill, Los Angeles, CA (winner)
175	2	"Viewers Choice Baskets"	Scott Conant, Amanda Freitag, and Geoffrey Zakarian	April 9, 2013
Ingredients: Appetizer: durian, lime gelatin, imitation crab meat, crunchy cheese curls; Entrée: chicken in a can, clam chowder, potato tots, skirt steak; Dessert: kale, fruit cocktail, cottage cheese, marrow bones; Contestants: John Herndon, Executive Chef, Umami Burger Restaurant Group, Los Angeles, CA (eliminated after the appetizer); Rory Philipson, Chef and Owner, The Blue Bottle Cafe, Hopewell, NJ (eliminated after the entrée); Tre Ghoshal, Chef and Owner, Adara, Montclair, NJ (eliminated after the dessert); Luke Reyes, Executive Chef, The Corner Door, Culver City, CA (winner); Notes: This was the second viewers' choice episode. The basket ingredients were chosen by fans via social media.
176	3	"Aussie Awesome"	Scott Conant, Marc Murphy, and John Li	April 16, 2013
Ingredients: Appetizer: vegetable yeast spread, barramundi, rucola, gummy snake; Entrée: Australian beer, T-bone steak, bosc pears, chocolate biscuits; Dessert: lamingtons, lemon verbena, wattleseeds, blueberry pomegranate lollies; Contestants: McCaily Cranna, Sous chef, Hudson's on the Bend, Austin, TX (eliminated after the appetizer); Bruce Barber, Caterer, Aussie Chef Catering, Sherman Oaks, CA (eliminated after the entrée); Michael Bryant, Executive Chef, Eva Restaurant, Los Angeles, CA (eliminated after the dessert); Mai-Khanh "Maiki" Le, Chef de cuisine, Josie, Santa Monica, CA (winner); Notes: The basket ingredients were Australian-themed.
177	4	"Without Missing a Beet"	Marc Murphy, Chris Santos, and Aarón Sánchez	April 30, 2013
Ingredients: Appetizer: banana chips, frozen grilled chicken breasts, candy cane beets, cherry jelly beans; Entrée: pink beans, sofrito, striped bass, coconut chocolate bars; Dessert: frozen yogurt, amaretti cookies, candied orange peels, red curry paste; Contestants: Ashley Hough, Personal Chef, Los Angeles, CA (eliminated after the appetizer); Angela Majko, Sushi Chef, Uchiko, Austin, TX (eliminated after the entrée); Rouha Sadighi, Chef de cuisine, Penelope Café, New York, NY (eliminated after the dessert); Taji Marie, Caterer, Simple Gourmet, Redondo Beach, CA (winner); Notes: In round 2, Chef Majko dropped her bass on the floor.
178	5	"Momumental"	Marc Murphy, Alex Guarnaschelli, and Maneet Chauhan	May 7, 2013
Ingredients: Appetizer: coffee, pheasant, escarole, peanut butter blossom cookies; Entrée: carrot baby food, pork butt, mustard greens, red quinoa; Dessert: bison grass vodka, guava paste, pistachios, crustless peanut butter and jelly sandwiches; Contestants: Gio Bellino, Homemaker from Sands Point, NJ (eliminated after the appetizer); Anette Kreipke, Former Advertiser and Homemaker from Ridgefield, NJ (eliminated after the entrée); Heidi Greening, Homemaker from Georgetown, TX (eliminated after the dessert); Diana Sabater, Police Officer from Philadelphia, PA (winner); Notes: This was a special episode where the contestants were mothers and home cooks. They wore street clothes rather than the customary chef coats while competing, but were given chef coats by Ted Allen at the end of the episode.
179	6	"Amazing Amateurs"	Geoffrey Zakarian, Alex Guarnaschelli, and Aarón Sánchez	May 14, 2013
Ingredients: Appetizer: dragon fruit, guanciale, sunflower sprouts, scallops; Entrée: pork chops, yacon, broccoli rabe, burgundy truffles; Dessert: honey soaked nuts, organic red wine, calamansi limes, salted butter crackers; Contestants: Nate Echelberger, Pastor of Gateway Church in Austin, TX (eliminated after the appetizer); Melissa Campbell, Training Administrator from Los Angeles, CA (eliminated after the entrée); Rique Uresti, Spin Instructor from New York, NY (eliminated after the dessert); Marisa Biaggi, Content Producer and Strategist/PR from New York, NY (winner); Notes: This episode featured home cooks. The contestants wore regular clothes during the competition but winner Marisa Biaggi received a Chopped chef's coat at the end, in addition to the prize money.
180	7	"Breakfast, Lunch and Dinner!"	Amanda Freitag, Aarón Sanchez, and Maneet Chauhan	May 21, 2013
Ingredients: Appetizer: black forest bacon, ricotta pancakes, smoked salmon, prune juice; Entrée: quiche lorraine, purple cauliflower, blue shrimp, rosé wine; Dessert: chateaubriand, horseradish root, tawny port, stone crab claws; Contestants: Fred Eric, Chef and Restaurateur, Fred 62, Los Angeles, CA (eliminated after the appetizer); Natalie Cain, Line Cook, Red Rooster Harlem, Harlem, NY (eliminated after the entrée); Chris Leahy, Executive Chef, Lexington Brass, New York, NY (eliminated after the dessert); Brandon Boudet, Chef and Restaurateur, 101 Coffee Shop, Dominick's, Little Dom's, and Tom Bergin's Tavern, Los Angeles, CA (winner); Notes: In this episode, the appetizer course was replaced with a breakfast course, the entrée with lunch, and the dessert with dinner. Chef Cain works at Red Rooster Harlem, owned by Chopped judge Marcus Samuelsson.
181	8	"Military Salute"	Scott Conant, Amanda Freitag, and Chris Santos	May 28, 2013
Ingredients: Appetizer: freeze dried roast beef, torshi, rainbow chard, mint yogurt soda; Entrée: Afghan flatbread, goat chops, zucchini, survival candy; Dessert: pomegranate, pilot bread crackers, fruit chews, freeze dried carrots; Contestants: Victor Vinson, Chef, U.S. Army (retired) / Personal Chef from Huntington Beach, CA (eliminated after the appetizer); Judy Cage-McLean, Chef, U.S. Army (retired) / Caterer from Spring Lake, NC (eliminated after the entrée); Jacoby Ponder, Chef, U.S. Navy (retired) / Personal Chef from Virginia Beach, VA (eliminated after the dessert); Robbie Myers, U.S. Army (retired) / Senior Food Service Manager from Adams Center, NY (winner); Notes: The contestants in this episode were retired members of the U.S. military with professional cooking experience. Each round featured an item that might be found in a military pantry.
182	9	"Cook Your Butt Off!"	Scott Conant, Alex Guarnaschelli, and Marcus Samuelsson	May 30, 2013
Ingredients: Appetizer: dried goji berries, bitter melon, duck breast, kumquats; Entrée: coconut oil, black cod, dinosaur kale, pork rinds; Dessert: clotted cream, passion fruit purée, spirulina, angel food cake; Contestants: Elizabeth Mwanga, Founder, Winning Diabetics, New York, NY (eliminated after the appetizer); Chris Avtges, Food Service Director, Eastern Connecticut State University, Willimantic, CT (eliminated after the entrée); Joel Gargano, Executive Chef, Higher One, New Haven, CT (eliminated after the dessert); Phillip Dell, Private Chef, Sin City Chefs, Newport Beach, CA (winner); Notes: Each of the chefs had lost significant amounts of weight through better diet and exercise, and were tasked with making light dishes.
183	10	"Better Saffron Than Sorry"	Elizabeth Karmel, Maneet Chauhan, and Marcus Samuelsson	June 4, 2013
Ingredients: Appetizer: mussels, blue cheese stuffed olives, saffron, añejo tequila; Entrée: amaranth leaves, blackberries, lamb fries, curd chile; Dessert: argan oil, apricots, fresh pasta sheets, cheese spread; Contestants: Christian Dolias, Chef, Cutthroat Culinary, Las Vegas, NV (eliminated after the appetizer); Kurt Ramborger, Caterer, Austin, TX (eliminated after the entrée); David Fuñe, Executive Chef, Vizzi Truck / Temecula Creek Inn, Los Angeles, CA / Temecula, CA (eliminated after the dessert); Martha Esquivel, Executive Chef, Luminarias Restaurant, Monterey Park, CA (winner); Notes: Chef Ramborger was the first deaf chef to participate in the show. He was accompanied by interpreter Lydia Callis.
184	11	"Take Heart"	Marc Murphy, Maneet Chauhan, and Amanda Freitag	June 6, 2013
Ingredients: Appetizer: shishito peppers, ground pork, grape jelly, sausage gravy; Entrée: sticky rice, bok choy, key lime juice, lamb hearts; Dessert: coconut jam, shredded phyllo dough, ginger ale, peanut caramel candy bars; Contestants: Ian Kokkeler, Chef, Trace Restaurant at W Austin, Austin, TX (eliminated after the appetizer); Charles Slonaker, Food Truck Chef, Go Chew Los Angeles, CA (eliminated after the entrée); Monique King, Chef and Owner, Firefly Bistro, South Pasadena, CA (eliminated after the dessert); Barry Frish, Chef de cuisine, Restaurant Marc Forgione, New York, NY (winner)
185	12	"Wheatgrass Roots"	Amanda Freitag, Marc Murphy, and Alex Guarnaschelli	June 18, 2013
Ingredients: Appetizer: rice wrappers, morel mushrooms, chia seeds, dandelion greens; Entrée: etrog citron, golden beets, wheatgrass, tempeh; Dessert: cranberries, green tea powder, edamame, local honey; Contestants: David Garrido, Chef and Owner, Garrido's, Austin, TX (eliminated after the appetizer); Sonya Coté, Executive Chef and Owner, Hillside Farmacy, Austin TX (eliminated after the entrée); Mustapha Rahiim, Executive Chef, New York, NY (eliminated after the dessert); Rich Landau, Chef and Owner, Vedge, Philadelphia, PA (winner); Notes: This was a vegetarian and vegan-themed episode; the only animal product was the local honey.
186	13	"Wurst Case Scenario"	Scott Conant, Maneet Chauhan, and Geoffrey Zakarian	July 23, 2013
Ingredients: Appetizer: shrimp, yuca, sweet relish, currywurst; Entrée: Chilean sea bass, avocado, dried wakame seaweed, popcorn balls; Dessert: steel cut oats, feta cheese, watermelon syrup, huckleberries; Contestants: Michele Harriott, Catering Chef, CulinAriane, Montclair, NJ (eliminated after the appetizer); Geter Atienza, Sous chef, The Fairmont Miramar Hotel, Santa Monica, CA (eliminated after the entrée); Des Lim, Executive Chef, Trump SoHo, New York, NY (eliminated after the dessert); Anup Joshi, Chef de cuisine, Tertulia, New York, NY (winner); Notes: Chef Harriott cut herself in the appetizer round and put on a glove but removed it prior to plating, contaminating her dish in the process. After the other chefs gave their consent, the judges allowed her to bring the non-contaminated components of her dish from her station to the judges' table.

=== Season 16 (2013) ===
No. overall	No. in season	Title	Judges	Original release date
187	1	"Fry, Fry, Again"	Chris Santos, Amanda Freitag, and Geoffrey Zakarian	June 2, 2013
Ingredients: Appetizer: kosher pickles, catfish filets, green plantains, young coconut; Entrée: capon, halloumi cheese, okra, cherry spoon fruit; Dessert: avocados, pizza dough, red jalapeño peppers, chocolate sandwich cookies; Contestants: Vincent Williams, Chef and Restaurateur, Honey's Kettle Fried Chicken, Los Angeles, CA (eliminated after the appetizer); Vanessa Ayala, Catering Cook, Skybox Sports Bar and Lounge, Roselle, NJ (eliminated after the entrée); Erik Cho, Food Truck Owner, Frysmith, Los Angeles, CA (eliminated after the dessert); Erica Beneke, Executive Chef, Max's Wine Dive, Austin, TX (winner); Notes: Each dish had to have at least one fried element. The chefs were provided with oil at frying temperature to start each round.
188	2	"Cleaver Fever"	Scott Conant, Alex Guarnaschelli, and Elizabeth Karmel	June 11, 2013
Ingredients: Appetizer: tuna belly, key limes, black radishes, bacon popcorn; Entrée: leg of lamb, toban djan, spinach, lassi; Dessert: rosewater syrup, almond butter, rambutans, mashed potato candy; Contestants: Raquel Jubran, Executive Chef, The Attic, Long Beach, CA (eliminated after the appetizer); Sevan Abdessian, Chef and Restaurateur, Recess Eatery, Glendale, CA (eliminated after the entrée); Owen Clark, Executive Chef, Gwynnett Street Restaurant, Williamsburg, Brooklyn, NY (eliminated after the dessert); Nicole Mummolo, Sous chef, La Puerta Azul, Millbrook, NY (winner)
189	3	"Mix and Mache"	Aarón Sánchez, Alex Guarnaschelli, and Marcus Samuelsson	June 16, 2013
Ingredients: Appetizer: pickled sausage, mache, blood oranges, southern cabbage; Entrée: lobster bisque, baby leeks, daikon, squid; Dessert: green cerignola olives, honey distilled liqueur, gala apples, Kaiserschmarrn; Contestants: Roy Handler, Caterer, Haute Mess Catering, Los Angeles, CA (eliminated after the appetizer); Lara Paul, Executive Chef, Rivals Steakhouse, Austin, TX (eliminated after the entrée); Mogan Anthony, Executive Chef, Village Social, Mount Kisco, NY (eliminated after the dessert); Joseph Miller, Chef and Restaurateur, Joe's Restaurant, Venice Beach, CA (winner); Notes: The Kaiserschmarrn in the dessert round was an instant mix.
190	4	"Gyro We Go Again"	Marcus Samuelsson, Elizabeth Karmel, and Aarón Sánchez	June 25, 2013
Ingredients: Appetizer: gyro meat, piquillo peppers, hearts of palm, oysters; Entrée: sirloin flap, rainbow carrots, formaggio di fossa, chocolate covered donuts; Dessert: sorghum molasses, kefir, cactus pear, pigs in a blanket; Contestants: Jaquy Yngvason, Food Stylist, New York, NY (eliminated after the appetizer); Tara Thomas, Executive Chef / Owner, Traxx, Los Angeles, CA (eliminated after the entrée); Guillermo Perez, Chef de cuisine, SushiSamba NYC Park, New York, NY (eliminated after the dessert); Thomas McKenna, Sous chef, Jean-Georges, New York, NY (winner)
191	5	"Big Fish, Small Basket"	Scott Conant, Geoffrey Zakarian, and Aarón Sánchez	June 27, 2013
Ingredients: Appetizer: seitan, purple ninja radishes, mezcal, canned chili; Entrée: liquid aminos, beet greens, alfredo sauce, fluke; Dessert: speck, sfogliatelle, crabapples, brewer's yeast; Contestants: Paul Joseph, Executive Chef, FireBird, New York, NY (eliminated after the appetizer); Salvatore Lima, Executive Chef, Giovanna's, Little Italy, New York, NY (eliminated after the entrée); Steve Eakins, Executive Chef, Ditch Plains, New York, NY (eliminated after the dessert); Palak Patel, Culinary Instructor, Ger-Nis, Brooklyn, NY (winner); Notes: Chef Eakins works at Ditch Plains, which is owned by Chopped judge Marc Murphy.
192	6	"Teen Invasion"	Marc Murphy, Amanda Freitag, and Marcus Samuelsson	July 2, 2013
Ingredients: Appetizer: grapefruit, tuna, hen of the woods mushrooms, graham cracker cereal; Entrée: leg of goat, hummus, rhubarb, frisée; Dessert: kettle-style potato chips, black currant jam, red Anjou pears, Japanese mayonnaise; Contestants: Tyler Bloch (age 14), from Jericho, NY (eliminated after the appetizer); Molly Bhuiyan (age 17), from New York, NY (eliminated after the entrée); Emma Scher (age 17), from Ridgewood, NJ (eliminated after the dessert); Mikey Robins (age 14), from Philadelphia, PA (winner); Notes: This was a special all-teen episode. The first round was extended to 30 minutes instead of the usual 20 minutes. The eliminated contestants each received a $1,000 gift card.
193	7	"Mochi Obliged"	Scott Conant, Amanda Freitag, and Maneet Chauhan	July 9, 2013
Ingredients: Appetizer: escargot, cilantro chutney, biscuit dough, merguez; Entrée: dorado, cherry wheat beer, country style pâté, ivy gourd; Dessert: dehydrated chocolate covered strawberries, hemp milk, ataulfo mango, mochi; Contestants: Regina Chen, Sous chef, Maison Akira, Pasadena, CA (eliminated after the appetizer); Cathy McKnight, Executive Chef, What a Dish Café, Dana Point, CA (eliminated after the entrée); Jason Quinn, Chef and Owner, Playground, Santa Ana, CA (eliminated after the dessert); Cole Dickinson, Chef de cuisine, ink., Los Angeles, CA (winner)
194	8	"Sweet Surprises"	Scott Conant, Alex Guarnaschelli, and Marcus Samuelsson	July 16, 2013
Ingredients: Appetizer: rack of wild boar, broccolini, hazelnuts, three-tiered vanilla fondant cake; Entrée: duck, cardoons, preserved lemons, macaroons; Dessert: clementines, cheese wedges, Aleppo pepper, frozen hot chocolate; Contestants: Jemell Simpson, Caterer, Taste My Expression Catering, New York, NY (eliminated after the appetizer); Kenny Gray, Sous chef, Olivia Restaurant, Austin, TX (eliminated after the entrée); Allison Robicelli, Pastry Chef, Robicelli's, Brooklyn, NY (eliminated after the dessert); Madeline Lanciani, Pastry Chef, Duane Park Patisserie, New York, NY (winner); Notes: Each basket had a special confection hidden under a separate cloche that had to be used in their dish.
195	9	"Break a Crab Leg!"	Marc Murphy, Maneet Chauhan, and Geoffrey Zakarian	July 30, 2013
Ingredients: Appetizer: babaco, gìo lụa, chive blossoms, quark; Entrée: crab legs, sweet vermouth, asparagus, Mexican wedding cookies; Dessert: red bean paste, jicama, cilantro, bacon jam; Contestants: Chris Houlihan, Chef de cuisine, A-Frame, Los Angeles, CA (eliminated after the appetizer); Lucas Marino, Sous chef, The Darby, New York, NY (eliminated after the entrée); Betsy Rodriguez, Sous chef, The Goodwin, New York, NY (eliminated after the dessert); Josie Gordon, Personal Chef, New York, NY (winner); Notes: Chef Marino works for Chopped judge Alex Guarnaschelli at The Darby.
196	10	"Walk on the Whelk Side"	Geoffrey Zakarian, Maneet Chauhan, and Aarón Sánchez	August 6, 2013
Ingredients: Appetizer: lemon bars, acai juice, upland cress, whelk snails; Entrée: lamb shawarma, baby romanesco cauliflower, cornichons, chicken-flavored potato chips; Dessert: cucumber salad, cantaloupe, sesame seed candy, marshmallow spread; Contestants: Ben Durham, Executive Chef, Four Food Studio, Melville, NY (eliminated after the appetizer); Paolo Pasio, Chef and Restaurateur, Osteria Latini, Brentwood, CA (eliminated after the entrée); Natasha Pogrebinsky, Chef and Restaurateur, Bear, New York, NY (eliminated after the dessert); Katsuji Tanabe, Chef and Restaurateur, MexiKosher, Los Angeles, CA (winner)
197	11	"Chopped Family Feud"	Marc Murphy, Amanda Freitag, and Geoffrey Zakarian	August 11, 2013
Ingredients: Appetizer: cape gooseberries, falooda glass noodles, watercress, bacalao; Entrée: beef tip cap, cognac, green bean chips, cinnamon rolls; Dessert: spaetzle, moustalevria, walnuts, Japanese cola candy; Contestants: Kent Rathbun (charity: March of Dimes) (eliminated after the appetizer); Lou Campanaro (charity: Philadelphia Animal Welfare Society) (eliminated after the entrée); Joey Campanaro (charity: El Farro De los Animales) (eliminated after the dessert); Kevin Rathbun (charity: Atlanta Community Food Bank) (winner); Notes: The contestants were two pairs of brothers who competed together on Iron Chef America. They were competing head to head in this episode for a chance to win $10,000 for charity.
198	12	"Extreme Halloween"	Marc Murphy, Alex Guarnaschelli, and Chris Santos	October 6, 2013
Ingredients: Appetizer: potato crisps, eel, candy bats, coagulated pig blood; Entrée: gummy skull, collard greens, sweetbreads, dehydrated weaver ant eggs; Dessert: candy blood, deviled eggs, pâte sucrée, buffalo chestnuts; Contestants: John Creger, Head Chef, Gallow Green, New York, NY (eliminated after the appetizer); Isaiah Frizzell, Supper Club Chef, Feast Underground Supper Club, Los Angeles, CA (eliminated after the entrée); Terri Wahl, Chef and Restaurateur, Auntie Em's Kitchen, Eagle Rock, CA (eliminated after the dessert); Sharon Singelton, Caterer, Singlelicious Catering, Staten Island, NY (winner); Notes: This was a Halloween-themed episode. During the appetizer round, Ted warned the chefs that the eel had to be fully cooked due to the toxic nature of the eel's blood if left raw.
199	13	"A Chopped Thanksgiving"	Chris Santos, Maneet Chauhan, and Geoffrey Zakarian	November 12, 2013
Ingredients: Appetizer: turkey sausage, rutabaga, green bean casserole, honey baked ham; Entrée: whole turkey, Brussels sprouts, giblet gravy, pumpkin pie ice cream; Dessert: butternut squash soup, fennel, orange cranberry muffins, tofu turkey; Contestants: Nick Vazquez, Azúcar Cuban Cuisine, Jersey City, NJ (eliminated after the appetizer); Dustin Gauvain, Executive Chef, Front Steps, Austin, TX (eliminated after the entrée); Fiore Tedesco, Sous chef, Franklin Barbecue, Austin, TX (eliminated after the dessert); Ruth Cimaroli, Private Chef, New York, NY (winner); Notes: This was a Thanksgiving-themed episode. The chefs were given 40 minutes in the entrée round to allow them to properly prepare the turkey.

=== Season 17 (2013) ===
No. overall	No. in season	Title	Judges	Original release date
200	1	"Wasted!"	Geoffrey Zakarian, Alex Guarnaschelli, and Marcus Samuelsson	August 13, 2013
Ingredients: Appetizer: pickle juice, herb stems, overripe tomatoes, fish carcass; Entrée: wilted carrots, potatoes with eyes, parmesan cheese rinds, meat trimmings; Dessert: ends of bread loaves, squeezed orange halves, used coffee grinds, hardened brown sugar; Contestants: Molly Peck, Caterer, The Vanilla Orchid Catering, Austin, TX (eliminated after the appetizer); Dylan Hallas, Executive Chef, Petit Ermitage Hotel, West Hollywood, CA (eliminated after the entrée); Parind Vora, Chef and Restaurateur, Restaurant Jezebel, Austin, TX (eliminated after the dessert); Garrett Eagleton, Freelance Chef, The Meat Hook, Brooklyn, NY (winner); Notes: All of the ingredients of the baskets were ingredients that are normally thrown away. The fish carcass used in the appetizer was from cod.
201	2	"Keep On Trucking"	Geoffrey Zakarian, Maneet Chauhan, and Marc Murphy	August 18, 2013
Ingredients: Appetizer: smoked pork chops, savoy cabbage, ginger snap cookies, blood sausage; Entrée: halibut, Chinese celery, pepperoni risotto, orange powdered drink; Dessert: guanabana nectar, white chocolate chips, pecans, chipotle in adobo; Contestants: Tagan Couch, Food Truck Chef/Owner, The Gypsy Kit, Austin, TX (eliminated after the appetizer); Chris Trapani, Food Truck Chef/Owner, Urban Cowboy, Austin, TX (eliminated after the entrée); Hop Phan, Food Truck Chef/Owner, Dos Chinos, Orange County, CA (eliminated after the dessert); Michael Israel, Food Truck Chef/Owner, MOE Deli, Los Angeles, CA (winner); Notes: Each of the chefs competing operated a food truck.
202	3	"Sports Stars"	Chris Santos, Alex Guarnaschelli, and Marcus Samuelsson	September 3, 2013
Ingredients: Appetizer: salmon filet, candy-coated peanuts, redbor kale, lemon-lime sports drink; Entrée: spinach, filet mignon, almonds, chocolate-covered marshmallows; Dessert: protein powder, caramel coated popcorn, tangelo, olive oil cake; Contestants: Tiki Barber (charity: The Fresh Air Fund) (eliminated after the appetizer); Chuck Zito (charity: St. Jude Children's Research Hospital) (eliminated after the entrée); Natalie Coughlin (charity: Right To Play) (eliminated after the dessert); Danica Patrick (charity: COPD Foundation) (winner); Notes: In this episode, the competitors were sports stars competing for charity.
203	4	"Hero Chefs"	Marc Murphy, Amanda Freitag, and Cheryl Barbara	September 10, 2013
Ingredients: Appetizer: chicken soup, ground pork, pattypan squash, barbecue sauce; Entrée: scallops, Chinese broccoli, tamarillos, finger limes; Dessert: aged cheddar cheese, Granny Smith apples, hamburger buns, vanilla frosting; Contestants: Wilhelmina Bell, Executive Chef, Children's Village/Program Coordinator, Philadelphia, PA (eliminated after the appetizer); Pedro Rodriguez, Head Chef, New York City Rescue Mission, New York, NY (eliminated after the entrée); Nicki Bogie, Culinary Instructor, The Fresh Air Fund, Fishkill, NY (eliminated after the dessert); Derek B. Walker, Executive Chef, Bread and Roses Café, Venice, CA (winner); Notes: Each of the competitors in this episode is a hero in their community. Judge Cheryl Barbara was the winner of the first school chef episode, Class Acts (in season 9).
204	5	"We Love Leftovers!"	Scott Conant, Chris Santos, and Geoffrey Zakarian	September 17, 2013
Ingredients: Appetizer: 1/2 burger, untouched fortune cookies, leftover sautéed broccoli, remnant pan of lasagna; Entrée: BBQ ribs, cold and soggy french fries, slice of German chocolate cake, leftover chili; Dessert: cooked corn cobs, unfinished pitcher of sangria, packets of duck sauce, stale plain doughnuts; Contestants: Josh Watkins, Executive Chef, The Carillon, Austin, TX (eliminated after the appetizer); Krissy Kerwin, Private Chef, Los Angeles, CA (eliminated after the entrée); Aatul Jain, Executive Chef, St. Clare's Hospital, Denville, NJ (eliminated after the dessert); Jason Stude, Chef de cuisine, Second Bar + Kitchen, Austin, TX (winner); Notes: The baskets were filled with leftovers.
205	6	"Count Your Chickens"	Aarón Sánchez, Amanda Freitag, and Marcus Samuelsson	September 24, 2013
Ingredients: Appetizer: chicken livers, marrowfat peas, watermelon, chicken tenders; Entrée: chicken legs, chicken-flavored crackers, Napa cabbage, caramel-flavored liqueur; Dessert: chicken suckers, chicken fat, farm fresh eggs, fruit cake; Contestants: Brian Tsao, Executive Chef, Liang's, Forest Hills, NY (eliminated after the appetizer); David Catapano, Caterer, Romeo's Catering Service, Queens, NY (eliminated after the entrée); Eric McCarthy, Executive Chef, Tamarind Tribeca, New York, NY (eliminated after the dessert); Janelle Reynolds, Caterer and Personal Chef, @ Large Catering and Private Chef Services, Austin, TX (winner); Notes: This episode's baskets had chicken products in every round.
206	7	"Liver and Learn"	Chris Santos, Amanda Freitag, and Geoffrey Zakarian	October 1, 2013
Ingredients: Appetizer: calf liver, lemon potatoes, pickled Chinese mustard greens, ranch dressing; Entrée: quail, sumac, turnips, peanut crisp candy bars; Dessert: yuzu marmalade, whipped cream cheese, hot sauce, corn flakes cereal; Contestants: Shaquay Peacock, Sous chef, The New York Times, New York, NY (eliminated after the appetizer); Jared Braithwaite, Executive Chef, Layla, New York, NY (eliminated after the entrée); Seth Gordon, Executive Chef, Dune Studios, Manhattan, NY (eliminated after the dessert); Teah Evans, Chef, FireFly American Bistro, Manasquan, NJ (winner); Notes: The turnips used in the entrée were baby turnips. Shaquay's brother Darius won Chopped twice
207	8	"Brunch Boxes"	Marc Murphy, Alex Guarnaschelli, and Aarón Sánchez	October 15, 2013
Ingredients: Appetizer: quail eggs, kale, champagne, caviar; Entrée: emu egg, pancake mix, bloody mary mix, lobster; Dessert: Araucana eggs, waffles, maple syrup, Canadian bacon; Contestants: Neil Fuentes, Personal Chef, New Haven, CT (eliminated after the appetizer); Shannon Olvera, Executive Chef, Red Restaurant & Bar, City of Industry, CA (eliminated after the entrée); Joyce Brandes, Chef de cuisine, DuMont Burger, Brooklyn, NY (eliminated after the dessert); Nick Di Bona, Executive Chef, Peter Pratt's Inn, Yorktown Heights, NY (winner); Notes: Each basket contained ingredients commonly used to prepare brunch dishes.
208	9	"Circus Spectacular"	Scott Conant, Chris Santos, and Ron Ben-Israel	October 24, 2013
Ingredients: Appetizer: cotton candy, peanuts in the shell, corn dogs, Tokyo scallions; Entrée: nachos, chicken fingers, candy apples, baby corn; Dessert: snow cones, funnel cakes, popcorn, sour cream; Contestants: Steve Yen, Sous chef, Catch, New York, NY (eliminated after the appetizer); John Atkinson, Chef and Restaurateur, North End Café, Manhattan Beach, CA (eliminated after the entrée); Jesse Olson, Executive Chef, Vanderbilt, Brooklyn, NY (eliminated after the dessert); Claire Handleman, Culinary Producer, The Chew, New York, NY (winner); Notes: Each basket included something with a circus theme.
209	10	"Competition Italiano"	Scott Conant, Alex Guarnaschelli, and Maneet Chauhan	October 29, 2013
Ingredients: Appetizer: soppressata, pasta dough, newborn baby fish, limoncello; Entrée: veal chops, bottarga, graffiti eggplant, caffé macchiato; Dessert: figs, burrata, piadina, chinotto; Contestants: Philip Meoli, Chef de cuisine, Brooklyn Pub, Brooklyn, NY (eliminated after the appetizer); Lisa Savage, Chef and Restaurateur, Sage Restaurant, Ventnor, NJ (eliminated after the entrée); Luca Manderino, Chef and Restaurateur, La Sosta Enoteca, Hermosa Beach, CA (eliminated after the dessert); Antonio Mure, Chef and Restaurateur, Ado Ristorante, Venice Beach, CA (winner); Notes: This was an Italian-themed episode.
210	11	"Redeemed or Re-chopped?"	Marc Murphy, Alex Guarnaschelli, and Aarón Sánchez	November 5, 2013
Ingredients: Appetizer: vegan lobster, hot mustard, canned chop suey, winter melon; Entrée: skordalia, Hawaiian parrotfish, pickled sour grapes, chayote squash; Dessert: bubble tea, papaya, coconut butter, chocolate-covered bananas; Contestants: Frank Whittaker, Executive Sous chef, Fishtail by David Burke, New York, NY (Episode 11.7 – "Ready, Set, Escargot!") (eliminated after the appetizer); Jeff Eng, Executive Chef, Clyde's Tower Oaks Lodge, Rockville, MD (Episode 11.4 – "Leftovers Extravaganza!") (eliminated after the entrée); Kent Rollins (Episode 12.17 – "Grill Masters: Part Four") and (Episode 12.18 – "Grill Masters: Finale") (eliminated after the dessert); Zoe Feigenbaum, Chef and Restaurateur, Zoë, New York, NY (Episode 12.11 – "A Bunny Thing Happened") (winner); Notes: This episode featured four past runners-up.
211	12	"Cloche Call"	Marcus Samuelsson, Maneet Chauhan, and Aarón Sánchez	November 19, 2013
Ingredients: Appetizer: kimchi, apple sauce, gefilte fish, lavash; Entrée: brook trout, cream corn, kale chips, bacon-flavored vodka; Dessert: opal basil, orange blossom water, dried apricots, marshmallow snack cakes; Contestants: Josh Greenfield, Caterer/Internet Chef, Brooklyn, NY (eliminated after the appetizer); Mike Greenfield, Caterer/Internet Chef, Brooklyn, NY (eliminated after the entrée); Emilie Friedman, Personal Chef, New York, NY (eliminated after the dessert); Sean Quinn, Executive Chef, Chadwick's, Bay Ridge, Brooklyn, NY (winner)
212	13	"Celebrity Holiday Bash"	Geoffrey Zakarian, Maneet Chauhan, and Amanda Freitag	December 3, 2013
Ingredients: Appetizer: reindeer pâté, sparkling cider, candied ginger, jelly-filled donuts; Entrée: rosca de reyes, wagyu rib-eye steaks, broccoli, cocktail sauce; Dessert: Douglas fir brandy, plum pudding, dried persimmon, chocolate Santa; Contestants: Antonio Sabato Jr. (charity: Boys and Girls Club of Ventura) (eliminated after the appetizer); Dawn Wells (charity: Terri Lee Wells' Discovery Museum for Children) (eliminated after the entrée); Anthony Anderson (charity: United Negro College Fund) (eliminated after the dessert); Teri Hatcher (charity: Juvenile Arthritis Association) (winner); Notes: This special holiday episode featured celebrities competing for a charity. As a food safety measure, at the start of the entrée round, the competitors were informed that rosca de reyes contained several small baby Jesus figurines.

=== Season 18 (2013–14) ===
No. overall	No. in season	Title	Judges	Original release date
213	1	"No Pain, No Shame"	Marc Murphy, Geoffrey Zakarian, and Aarón Sánchez	November 26, 2013
Ingredients: Appetizer: smoked catfish, ricotta salata, giant jawbreaker, watermelon soda; Entrée: lamb tagine, miso paste, croissant doughnuts, zucchini blossoms; Dessert: blueberry scones, ginger preserves, rosemary, gjetost cheese; Contestants: Jonah Frazier, Executive Sous chef, Garden Terrace, Belmot Park, Elmont, NY (eliminated after the appetizer); Jason Rivas, Chef de cuisine, South Coast Winery Resort & Spa, Temecula, CA (eliminated after the entrée); Amanda "Tek" Moore, Executive Chef, Le Barricou, Brooklyn, NY (eliminated after the dessert); Kristen Gregory, Executive Chef, Firefly Grille, Nashville, TN (winner); Notes: Chef Tek previously competed on Gordon Ramsay's Hell's Kitchen Season 6, Placing 12th.
214	2	"Teen Talent"	Joseph Brown, Alex Guarnaschelli, and Marcus Samuelsson	December 10, 2013
Ingredients: Appetizer: swordfish steaks, broccoli rabe, tiger figs, cherry flavored drink; Entrée: toaster pastries, filet mignon, truffles, heirloom tomatoes; Dessert: strawberry mints, salt bagels, cream cheese, cotton candy grapes; Contestants: Roxy Belfiore (age 15), from Deptford Township, NJ (eliminated after the appetizer); Matthew Wheelock (age 16), from Brooklyn, NY (eliminated after the entrée); Simona Alomary (age 14), from Piscataway, NJ (eliminated after the dessert); Hunter Zampa (age 13), from Stamford, CT (winner); Notes: The contestants in this episode were teenagers competing to win a $40,000 scholarship to attend culinary school. The runner-up received a $20,000 scholarship, while the other two chefs each received a $5,000 scholarship. The contestants had 30 minutes in the appetizer round instead of the usual 20 minutes. Hunter Zampa is the youngest contestant to win a Teen Chopped episode. Judge Joseph Brown is from the culinary schools at The Art Institutes, which awarded the scholarships.
215	3	"Tapas Time"	Amanda Freitag, Aarón Sánchez, and Michelle Bernstein	December 17, 2013
Ingredients: Appetizer: Boquerones, pan de leche, gazpacho, head-on shrimp; Entrée: Spanish tortilla, serrano ham, chayote, squid; Dessert: Catalan creme, Cava, oranges, Marcona almonds; Contestants: Andres Figueroa, Executive Chef, Antojeria La Popular, New York, NY (eliminated after the appetizer); Gemma Gray, Executive Sous Chef, Andaz, West Hollywood, CA (eliminated after the entrée); David Viana, Chef de Cuisine, Daryl, New Brunswick, NJ (eliminated after the dessert); Alex Moreno, Executive Chef, Border Grill, Santa Monica, CA (winner); Notes: The chefs were required to make tapas in each round— at least two dishes in the appetizer round, three in the entrée round, and two in the dessert round. Because of the change in format, the first round was 30 minutes instead of the usual 20 to allow proper time to make multiple dishes.
216	4	"Waste Not"	Aarón Sánchez, Marcus Samuelsson, and Hooni Kim	January 5, 2014
Ingredients: Appetizer: lobster bodies, juicer pulp, used tea bags, stale pita; Entrée: brownie edges, near-empty bottle of ranch dressing, onion ends, rotisserie chicken picked down to the bone; Dessert: pineapple skin and core, last piece of cheese, cucumber peels, brown avocados; Contestants: Pip Freeman, Chef & Owner, Three Letters, Brooklyn, NY (eliminated after the appetizer); Lauren Von Der Pool, Personal Chef, Washington, DC (eliminated after the entrée); Damon Gordon, Executive Chef, Water Grill, Santa Manica, CA (eliminated after the dessert); Sarah Pouzar, Executive Chef, Il Forno, New York, NY (winner); Notes: The baskets featured ingredients are food scraps. The juicer pulp in the first round was beet pulp.
217	5	"Firefighter Chefs"	Scott Conant, Alex Guarnaschelli, and Marcus Samuelsson	January 12, 2014
Ingredients: Appetizer: wildfire lettuce, 'nduja, burrata, roti; Entrée: ghost peppers, rack of wild boar, cucuzza squash, saganaki; Dessert: wafer sheets, vanilla pudding cups, lemon soda, blow torch; Contestants: Sal DePaola, FDNY Firefighter (Engine 160) from Staten Island, NY (eliminated after the appetizer); Antonia Donnelly, PFD Firefighter (Local 22) from Philadelphia, PA (eliminated after the entrée); Robert Corbin, NFD Firefighter/Engineer from Nashville, TN (eliminated after the dessert); Richard Fields, LAFD Captain from Los Angeles, CA (winner); Notes: All the contestants in this episode were firefighters. Before starting the entrée round, Ted had the chefs light the saganaki with some alcohol and a lighter provided in the basket. The blow torch in the dessert basket was the first time a non-food item was featured in a basket.
218	6	"Hoofin' It!"	Aarón Sánchez, Marcus Samuelsson, and Alex Stupak	January 21, 2014
Ingredients: Appetizer: pickled pigs feet, butter beans, coleslaw mix, sweet potato chips; Entrée: venison tenderloin, watercress, eggplant, pecan pie; Dessert: chai tea latte, Lady gala apples, black licorice, puff pastry; Contestants: Ashley Fahr, Caterer & Food Stylist, New York, NY (eliminated after the appetizer); Laurie Potts, Executive Chef, Wild Horse Saloon, Nashville, TN (eliminated after the entrée); Maxcel Hardy, Private Chef, New York, NY (eliminated after the dessert); Joe Youkhan, Executive Chef & Owner, Tasting Spoon Food Truck, Orange County, CA (winner)
219	7	"Pizza Perfect"	Amanda Freitag, Alex Guarnaschelli, and Bruno DiFabio	February 2, 2014
Ingredients: Appetizer: thin crust pizza dough, king crab legs, malta, vegan pepperoni; Entrée: deep dish pizza dough, rabbit escabeche, Swiss chard, pineapple cheese spread; Dessert: crescent roll dough, pickled apricots, salted caramel sauce, candied mushrooms; Contestants: Sam Nuckols, Chef de Partie, Womack Restaurant, Los Angeles, CA (eliminated after the appetizer); Jimmy Wang, Chef & Consultant, former owner of Hot Stuff Café, San Gabriel, CA (eliminated after the entrée); Nikki Hill, Chef & Caterer, Earl's Gourmet Grub & La Copine, Los Angeles, CA (eliminated after the dessert); Germano Minen, Chef & Owner, Hostaria del Piccolo, Santa Monica & Venice, CA (winner); Notes: The chefs were required to make pizza in each round.
220	8	"All-Burger Meal!"	Amanda Freitag, Alex Guarnaschelli, and Spike Mendelsohn	February 9, 2014
Ingredients: Appetizer: veal shoulder, bean sprouts, Marsala wine, veal tongue; Entrée: whole brisket, short ribs, pickle juice Popsicles, quail eggs; Dessert: hamburger buns, chocolate peanut clusters, shaved coconut, sesame seeds; Contestants: Megan Logan, Executive Chef, Nick & Stef's Steakhouse, Los Angeles, CA (eliminated after the appetizer); Afton Farnsworth, Head Chef, Stout Burgers & Beer, Studio City, CA (eliminated after the entrée); Eli Irland, Sous Chef, The Flintridge Proper, La Cañada, CA (eliminated after the dessert); Evelyn Garcia, Junior Sous Chef, Kin Shop, New York, NY (winner); Notes: The chefs were required to make burgers in each round; each chef was given their own meat grinder to use.
221	9	"Chocolate Competition"	Aarón Sánchez, Maneet Chauhan, and Christina Tosi	February 11, 2014
Ingredients: Appetizer: Mayan chocolate bars, chocolate martini, eggplant, pasta sheets; Entrée: chocolate cake pops, white chocolate cocoa mix, quail, serrano peppers; Dessert: cacao paste, chocolate peanut butter cups, baumkuchen, cherries; Contestants: Pierre Coray, Private Chef & Caterer, Los Angeles, CA (eliminated after the appetizer); Lucy Collins, Sous Chef, Costada Italian Steakhouse, New York, NY (eliminated after the entrée); Juerg "Fed" Federer, Chef & Instructor, Sex on the Table, New York, NY (eliminated after the dessert); Phillip Frankland Lee, Chef & Owner, Scatch Bar, Los Angeles, CA (winner); Notes: All the baskets contained some kind of chocolate.
222	10	"Bacon Baskets!"	Scott Conant, Amanda Freitag, and Adam Sobel	February 16, 2014
Ingredients: Appetizer: Mangalitsa bacon, apple chips, horseradish leaves, smoked pork chops; Entrée: Iberico bacon, pork loin, kimchi, dried cherries; Dessert: applewood smoked bacon, poached pears, French toast, cracklings; Contestants: Noah von Blöm, Chef & Owner, Arc Food & Libations, Costa Mesa, CA (eliminated after the appetizer); Peter Kontomanolis, Sous Chef, Brookville Country Club, Long Island, NY (eliminated after the entrée); Blake Orchard, Sous Chef, BLD Restaurant, Los Angeles, CA (eliminated after the dessert); Roxanne Spruance, Executive Chef, Allison Eighteen, New York, NY (winner); Notes: Bacon appeared in every basket.
223	11	"Beer Here!"	Scott Conant, Chris Santos, and Greg Koch	February 23, 2014
Ingredients: Appetizer: toasted lager, hop drops, hickory smoked sausage, fried pickles; Entrée: bourbon barrel aged tripled ale, beer taffy, beer cheese, beef tips; Dessert: milk stout, stout beer jelly, soft pretzels, peaches; Contestants: Larry Monaco, Private Chef, Los Angeles, CA (eliminated after the appetizer); Hiep Le, Chef & Owner, Le Cellier, Marina del Rey, CA (eliminated after the entrée); Bradley Stellings, Consulting Chef, Ibaraki, Japan (eliminated after the dessert); Lauren Kyles, Head Chef, Daily Grill & Public School, Los Angeles, CA (winner); Notes: Beer appeared in every basket.
224	12	"Burn for the Worse"	Chris Santos, Alex Guarnaschelli, and Marc Murphy	April 7, 2014
Ingredients: Appetizer: Dim sum, honeydew melon, middle eastern noodles, ketchup; Entrée: mint julep, rack of lamb, eggplant, apple spiced cake; Dessert: corn tortillas, cassia sticks, paw paws, black corinth grapes; Contestants: Matt Dunn, Sous Chef, Marriott New York Marquis, New York, NY (eliminated after the appetizer); Ashton Keefe, Caterer & Instructor, Ashton Keefe Culinary Lifestyle Services, New York, NY (eliminated after the entrée); Jennifer Story, Personal Chef & Caterer, Cookin' Thyme Inc., Redondo Beach, CA (eliminated after the dessert); Giuseppe Gentile, Chef & Restaurateur, Pizzeria Il Fico, Los Angeles, CA (winner)
225	13	"An Egg Up"	Geoffrey Zakarian, Amanda Freitag, and Silvena Rowe	May 13, 2014
Ingredients: Appetizer: pork secreto, red leaf lettuce, onion ring snacks, 100-year-old eggs; Entrée: halibut, herbed cheese, asparagus, mango pudding; Dessert: sea buckthorn juice, waffle cones, vanilla yogurt cups, lime curd; Contestants: Roderick Bailey, Chef & Owner, Silly Goose, Nashville, TN (eliminated after the appetizer); Nissa Pierson, Owner, Ger-Nis Culinary & Herb Center, Hudson Valley, NY (eliminated after the entrée); George Rallis, Chef & Co-Owner, Hell Gate Social, Astoria, NY (eliminated after the dessert); Jeremy Bringardner, Corporate Executive Chef, Lyfe Kitchen, Culver City, CA (winner)

=== Season 19 (2014) ===
No. overall	No. in season	Title	Judges	Original release date
226	1	"Ambitious Amateurs"	Scott Conant, Alex Guarnaschelli, and Geoffrey Zakarian	February 4, 2014
Ingredients: Appetizer: chicken tenderloins, paprika peppers, fennel, ginger preserves; Entrée: tikka masala sauce, asian long beans, hanger steak, serrano ham croquettes; Dessert: guava shells in syrup, cottage cheese, couscous, candied chick peas; Contestants: Soraya Sobreidad, Loan Specialist/Drag Queen from Queens, NY (eliminated after the appetizer); Jackie Khanich, Entertainment Attorney from Los Angeles, CA (eliminated after the entrée); Tommy Werther, Retired Police Detective from Queens, NY (eliminated after the dessert); Dinah Surh, Hospital Administrator from Brooklyn, NY (winner); Notes: This episode featured four home cooks competing.
227	2	"Return and Redeem"	Scott Conant, Amanda Freitag, and Geoffrey Zakarian	February 25, 2014
Ingredients: Appetizer: lime gelatin, prosciutto, celery, prawn cocktail chips; Entrée: sour candy belts, quinoa, pickled turnips, red snapper; Dessert: palm seeds in syrup, chocolate-covered raisins, dulce de leche, multi-grain cereal; Contestants: Lauren Von Der Pool (Episode 18.4 – "Waste Not") (eliminated after the appetizer); Tre Ghoshal (Episode 15.2 – "Viewers Choice Baskets") (eliminated after the entrée); Natasha Pogrebinsky (Episode 16.10 – "Walk on the Whelk Side") (eliminated after the dessert); Michael Bryant (Episode 15.3 – "Aussie Awesome") (winner); Notes: This episode featured past contestants who were eliminated, returning for a second chance at winning.
228	3	"Grandma vs. Grandma"	Scott Conant, Amanda Freitag, and Chris Santos	March 4, 2014
Ingredients: Appetizer: fillet of sole, popovers, ginger, bacon grease; Entrée: meatloaf mix, sweet potatoes, green beans, Old Fashioned; Dessert: oatmeal, dried currants, yuzu juice, vanilla ice cream; Contestants: Nancy Judd (eliminated after the appetizer); Mannee Soohoo (eliminated after the entrée); Wenona Moorer (eliminated after the dessert); Elda Belanski (winner); Notes: All the contestants in this episode were grandmothers; some had experience in cooking professionally while others were home cooks. The contestants had 30 minutes in the appetizer round instead of 20. The meatloaf mix was made of a mix of veal, pork, and beef.
229	4	"Chopped Tournament of Stars: Sports Stars!"	Geoffrey Zakarian, Alex Guarnaschelli, and Marc Murphy	March 9, 2014
Ingredients: Appetizer: organic green juice, alligator, hen of the woods mushrooms, mini rainbow marshmallows; Entrée: turkey tenderloin, double yolked eggs, pattypan squash, finger limes; Dessert: liquid breakfast drink, pink wafer cookies, crystallized ginger, red bosc pears; Contestants: Jackie Joyner-Kersee, Charity: Jackie Joyner-Kersee Foundation (eliminated after the appetizer); Charles Oakley, Charity: Share Our Strength (eliminated after the entrée); Greg Louganis, Charity: Mending Kids International (eliminated after the dessert); Brandi Chastain, Charity: Bay Area Women's Sport Initiative (winner); Notes: Part one of a five-part competition for $50,000 for a charity of the winner's choice. The competitors in this heat were all athletes. The green juice included kale and ginger.
230	5	"Tournament of Stars: Rachael vs. Guy!"	Chris Santos, Maneet Chauhan, and Marc Murphy	March 16, 2014
Ingredients: Appetizer: beef tongue, Chinese broccoli, candied citron, microwavable chocolate cake; Entrée: buffalo hanger steak, watermelon cucumbers, pizza, ranch dip; Dessert: Peanut caramel chocolate bars, Chinese five spice, coconut milk, banana chips; Contestants: Coolio, Charity: Jarez Music Foundation (eliminated after the appetizer); Penn Jillette, Charity: Opportunity Village (eliminated after the entrée); Lou Diamond Phillips, Charity: Share Our Strength, No Kid Hungry (eliminated after the dessert); Carnie Wilson, Charity: Weight Loss Surgery Foundation of America (winner); Notes: Part two of a five-part competition for $50,000 for a charity of the winner's choice. The competitors in this heat appeared on the show Rachel vs. Guy.
231	6	"Chopped Tournament of Stars: Comedians!"	Chris Santos, Maneet Chauhan, and Geoffrey Zakarian	March 23, 2014
Ingredients: Appetizer: pickled pig lips, spinach, polenta, gummy fried eggs; Entrée: beer can chicken, jalapeño popper, collard greens, truffle honey; Dessert: cinnamon chips, cheese curls, vanilla cupcakes, apple cider; Contestants: Tommy Davidson, Charity: Down Syndrome Foundation of Florida (eliminated after the appetizer); Robert Wuhl, Charity: The Amanda Foundation (eliminated after the entrée); Sinbad, Charity: Downtown Dog Rescue (eliminated after the dessert); Gillian Vigman, Charity: Go Campaign (winner); Notes: Part three of a five-part competition for $50,000 for a charity of the winner's choice. The competitors in this heat were all comedians.
232	7	"Chopped Tournament of Stars: Actors"	Maneet Chauhan, Alex Guarnaschelli, and Amanda Freitag	March 30, 2014
Ingredients: Appetizer: squid, popcorn on the cob, dinosaur kale, candy blood; Entrée: steamed spiny lobster, pink fermented lemons, amaro, French breakfast radishes; Dessert: star cookies, strawberries, mascarpone cheese, Buddha's hand; Contestants: Tasha Smith, Charity: Planned Parenthood (eliminated after the appetizer); Lucas Grabeel, Charity: Harmony Project (eliminated after the entrée); Peter Scolari, Charity: Copd Foundation (eliminated after the dessert); Michael Imperioli, Charity: Pure Land Project (winner); Notes: Part four of a five-part competition for $50,000 for a charity of the winner's choice. The competitors in this heat were all actors.
233	8	"Chopped Tournament of Stars: Finale"	Marc Murphy, Alex Guarnaschelli, and Geoffrey Zakarian	April 6, 2014
Ingredients: Appetizer: 10 pack of tacos, escarole, dragon fruit, vanilla ice cream; Entrée: peking duck, brussels sprouts, cotton candy, veal demi glaze; Dessert: blueberry goat cheese, pecans, churros, champagne; Contestants: Carnie Wilson, Charity: Weight Loss Surgery Foundation of America (eliminated after the appetizer); Gillian Vigman, Charity: Go Campaign (eliminated after the entrée); Brandi Chastain, Charity: Bay Area Women's Sport Initiative (eliminated after the dessert); Michael Imperioli, Charity: Pure Land Project (winner); Notes: Finale of a five-part competition. The winners of the previous four heats competed for $50,000 for their charity of choice.
234	9	"Peri Peri Determined"	Marc Murphy, Maneet Chauhan, and Geoffrey Zakarian	April 22, 2014
Ingredients: Appetizer: chicken wings, stroopwafels, asian pears, peri peri; Entrée: sunflower seed spread, lamb breast, blueberries, lardo; Dessert: butternut squash, pie dough, aged Gouda cheese, nordic honey wine; Contestants: Melissa Torre, Cookie Confidential, Owner & Baker, Philadelphia, PA (eliminated after the appetizer); Auria Abraham, Chef & Owner, Auria's Malaysian Kitchen, Brooklyn, NY (eliminated after the entrée); Eric Buss, Executive Chef, Wood & Vine, Hollywood, CA (eliminated after the dessert); Georgeann Leaming, Chef & Co-Owner, Suppa, Philadelphia, PA (winner)
235	10	"Mother's Day"	Chris Santos, Alex Guarnaschelli, and Aarón Sánchez	May 6, 2014
Ingredients: Appetizer: chicken noodle soup, ground beef, spinach, salsa; Entrée: tilapia fillets, plantains, crispy fruit cereal, pink grapefruit jam; Dessert: passion fruit, dates, lady fingers, chocolate sauce; Contestants: Samantha McLerran, ER Physician from Moss, TN (eliminated after the appetizer); Tina Adams, Real Estate Agent from Bronxville, NY (eliminated after the entrée); Sunny Hostin, CNN Correspondent from New York, NY (eliminated after the dessert); Lisa Keys, Retired Physician's Assistant from Kennett Square, PA (winner); Notes: This was a special Mother's Day episode featuring home cooks who are mothers.
236	11	"Cool, Palm and Perfected"	Scott Conant, Maneet Chauhan, and Geoffrey Zakarian	May 27, 2014
Ingredients: Appetizer: pupusas, blowfish tails, black beans, horchata liqueor; Entrée: salami, date palms in brine, chicken breast, canned pumpkin; Dessert: basil juice, bananas, coconut butter, Jordan almonds; Contestants: David James Robinson, Executive Chef & Owner, Bezalel Gables, Hudson Valley, NY (eliminated after the appetizer); Ariane Resnick, Private Chef, West Hollywood, CA (eliminated after the entrée); Peter Lee, Caterer, Chef Pete's Catering Company, Orange County, CA (eliminated after the dessert); Rose Ludwig, Culinary Instructor, Le Cordon Bleu, Los Angeles, CA (winner); Notes: The blowfish tails were farm-raised and did not have any poison.
237	12	"There Will Be Bloody Marys"	Scott Conant, Alex Guarnaschelli, and Marc Murphy	June 3, 2014
Ingredients: Appetizer: mille crepe cake, snow crab claws, kohlrabi, Bloody Mary; Entrée: seafood paella, ground chicken, dry sherry, bread and butter pickles; Dessert: cinnamon whisky, phyllo dough, Brazil nuts, rose hip jam; Contestants: Millie Fernandez, Chef & Entrepreneur from Winnetka, CA (eliminated after the appetizer); Patrick Lacey, Chef de Cuisine from Port Chester, NY (eliminated after the entrée); Hayan Yi, Personal Chef from New York, NY (eliminated after the dessert); Jeffrey Forrest, Executive Chef from New York, NY (winner); Notes: Each round had an alcoholic beverage as a basket ingredient.
238	13	"Four Fathers"	Scott Conant, Maneet Chauhan, and Chris Santos	June 10, 2014
Ingredients: Appetizer: salt and vinegar potato chips, Dover sole fish, red Russian kale, sour cream; Entrée: single malt scotch, lamb porterhouse, rapini, tamarind paste; Dessert: chocolate cigars, pretzels, cocktail nuts, rice pudding; Contestants: Ian-Max Henriquez, Stay-At-Home-Dad from Los Angeles, CA (eliminated after the appetizer); Herb Hand, College Football Coach from Nashville, TN (eliminated after the entrée); Richie Katzenberg, Retired Restaurateur from Cape Cod, MA (eliminated after the dessert); Keith Young, Firefighter from Wantagh, NY (winner); Notes: This was a special Father's Day episode featuring home cooks who are fathers.

=== Season 20 (2014) ===
No. overall	No. in season	Title	Judges	Original release date
239	1	"Dread and Breakfast"	Scott Conant, Chris Santos, and Aarón Sánchez	March 18, 2014
Ingredients: Appetizer: coffee cake, mimosas, breakfast sausages, cream-filled chocolate eggs; Entrée: John Dory fish, arugula, vodka martini, pate; Dessert: prime rib, amarone wine, potato gratin, shallot confit; Contestants: Rose Kai, Executive Chef, Fresh Potato Factory, Northridge, CA (eliminated after the appetizer); Brandon Frohne, Executive Chef, Mason's, Nashville, TN (eliminated after the entrée); Matt Lackey, Executive Chef, Flyte World Dining and Wine, Nashville, TN (eliminated after the dessert); Joe Wetherbee, Chef & Restaurateur, Joe's Cafe, Granada Hills, CA (winner); Notes: In this episode, the appetizer course was replaced with a breakfast course, the entrée with lunch, and the dessert with dinner.
240	2	"Leftovers Rescue Mission"	Chris Santos, Alex Guarnaschelli, and Aarón Sánchez	April 29, 2014
Ingredients: Appetizer: leftover turkey meatloaf, leftover kimchi, leftover naan, leftover baked ziti; Entrée: leftover shepherd's pie, leftover hard-boiled eggs, hot sauce packets, leftover broccoli casserole; Dessert: banana pudding, leftover marmalade packets, broken crackers, leftover bacon; Contestants: Chris Lukic, Chef and Owner, Bloomfield, NJ (eliminated after the appetizer); Connie Tran, Chef and Owner, Los Angeles, CA (eliminated after the entrée); Kyle McClelland, Chef and Co-Owner, Brooklyn, NY (eliminated after the dessert); Mike Kollarik, Chef de Cuisine, New York, NY (winner); Notes: All the baskets contained leftovers.
241	3	"G'day, Chefs!"	Aarón Sánchez, Chris Santos, and John Li	May 20, 2014
Ingredients: Appetizer: lamb ribs, rainbow chard, loaded baked potato, cherry moonshine; Entrée: emu fan fillet, Australian mustard, vegetable pasties, moonshine; Dessert: canned cheddar cheese, wheat biscuit cereal, guanciale, apple moonshine; Contestants: Jason Netro, Head Chef, Papacitos, Brooklyn, NY (eliminated after the appetizer); Cass Quinlan Ashford, Personal Chef, Yonkers, NY (eliminated after the entrée); Peter Lemos, Chef de Cuisine, L&E Oyster Bar, Los Angeles, CA (eliminated after the dessert); Patti Peck, Chef & Restaurateur, Beachwood Café, Hollywood, CA (winner); Notes: Most of the basket contents had an Australian theme and included a different type of moonshine.
242	4	"Salt Pearls of Wisdom"	Alex Guarnaschelli, Aarón Sánchez, and Maneet Chauhan	June 17, 2014
Ingredients: Appetizer: head-on shrimp, pickled raisins, roasted chickpeas, Romanesco cauliflower; Entrée: baklava, bluefish, recaito, salt pearls; Dessert: vodka-infused chocolate milk, persimmons, crumpets, cashews; Contestants: Iain Falconer, Chef, Cooper's Mill, Tarrytown, NY (eliminated after the appetizer); Jonathan Mailo, Chef de Cuisine, BLT Prime, New York, NY (eliminated after the entrée); Steve Lohse, Chef, Lavender Lake, Brooklyn, NY (eliminated after the dessert); Clara Park, Freelance Chef, Philadelphia, PA (winner)
243	5	"Swai Not?"	Aarón Sánchez, Alex Guarnaschelli, and Geoffrey Zakarian	June 24, 2014
Ingredients: Appetizer: falafel mix, chicory, habanero peppers, date paste; Entrée: mostarda, swai fillets, chicken livers, turnips; Dessert: carob molasses, white chocolate chips, nougat biscuits, raspberries; Contestants: Ted Hirsch, Executive Chef, Blind Barber, Culver City, CA (eliminated after the appetizer); Vinny Tardo, Executive Chef, Saffire, Franklin, TN (eliminated after the entrée); Josh Cohen, Chef and Restaurateur, Anella/Jimmy's/Jimmy's Diner, Brooklyn, NY (eliminated after the dessert); Lindsay McClain, Chef de Cuisine, Jamonera, Philadelphia, PA (winner)
244	6	"Short and Sweetbreads"	Geoffrey Zakarian, Maneet Chauhan, and Chris Santos	July 1, 2014
Ingredients: Appetizer: dried beef, eggplant pulp, sweetbreads, honey comb; Entrée: monkfish, middle eastern cake spice, chestnuts, dill pickles; Dessert: Amaretto, butternut squash, mango chutney, chocolate covered potato chips; Contestants: Meg Hall, Caterer, Made by Meg, Redondo Beach, CA (eliminated after the appetizer); Whitney Werner, Chef & Restaurateur, Roast, Brentwood, CA (eliminated after the entrée); Albert Shim, Food Truck Owner, Belly BombZ, Los Angeles (eliminated after the dessert); Jeremy Barlow, Chef & Restaurateur, Sloco, Nashville, TN (winner)
245	7	"Fig Out"	Edi Frauneder, Aarón Sánchez, and Marc Murphy	July 8, 2014
Ingredients: Appetizer: sweet whitefish, pastis, cinnamon candies, oysters; Entrée: French onion soup mix, beef kidneys, parsnips, pickled caper leaves; Dessert: cane flavored syrup, vanilla wafers, figs, lemon verbena; Contestants: Emily Frith, Caterer, Corner Market Catering Co., Nashville, TN (eliminated after the appetizer); Todd Barrie, Executive Chef, Upstairs 2, Los Angeles, CA (eliminated after the entrée); Tamar Robinson, Private Chef, New York, NY (eliminated after the dessert); Tom Gloster, Executive Chef, Lula Trattoria, Mineola, NY (winner)
246	8	"Big Hitters"	Marc Murphy, Amanda Freitag, and Scott Conant	October 8, 2014
Ingredients: Appetizer: Italian sausage, tiny ice cream spheres, baby mustard greens, sunflower seeds; Entrée: soft pretzels, flank steak, blue cheese, tawny port wine; Dessert: coffee caramel, popcorn, hot dog buns, blueberries; Contestants: Jessica Helms, Executive Chef, St. Louis, MO (St. Louis Cardinals) (eliminated after the appetizer); Josh Distenfeld, Executive Chef, Baltimore, MD (Baltimore Orioles) (eliminated after the entrée); Cris Vazquez, Executive Chef, Arlington, TX (Texas Rangers) (eliminated after the dessert); James Major, Executive Chef, Cincinnati, OH (Cincinnati Reds) (winner); Notes: The theme of this episode was baseball with stadium themed foods and baseball stadium chefs.
247	9	"Offal Surprise"	Marc Murphy, Amanda Freitag, and Chris Santos	October 21, 2014
Ingredients: Appetizer: ramen, canned apples, okra, biscuit dough; Entrée: rocky mountain oysters, purple artichokes, pomegranates, cola; Dessert: peanuts in the shell, cream of coconut, rambutan, red velvet whoopie pies; Contestants: Naved Ferdinands, Executive Sous Chef, Pairings Palate + Plate, Cranford, NJ (eliminated after the appetizer); Tia McDonald, Director of Culinary Operations, Vetri Foundation for Children, Philadelphia, PA (eliminated after the entrée); Aaron DuBois, Sous Chef, Rustic Canyon, Santa Monica, CA (eliminated after the dessert); Mindy Merrel, Cookbook Writer/Recipe Developer, Nashville, TN (winner)
248	10	"Haricot Flair"	Aarón Sánchez, Maneet Chauhan, and Marc Murphy	October 28, 2014
Ingredients: Appetizer: fish balls, moscato, haricots verts, banana blossoms; Entrée: goat chops, asafoetida, petite french lentils, quince paste; Dessert: clotted cream fudge, rice crackers, rainbow sprinkles, pepper jelly; Contestants: Ashlee Saylor, Sous Chef, The Silly Goose, Nashville, TN (eliminated after the appetizer); Samia Behaya, Chef & Restaurateur, Simple Café & Restaurant, Brooklyn, NY (eliminated after the entrée); Lauren Proceszyrn, Chef Tournant, Portobello Café, Staten Island, NY (eliminated after the dessert); Natalia Gavaria, Private Chef, New York, NY (winner)
249	11	"Frankly Frantic"	Chris Santos, Amanda Freitag, and Scott Conant	November 4, 2014
Ingredients: Appetizer: kelp noodles, mustard seeds, vegan hot dogs, minestrone soup; Entrée: fire roasted peppers, branzino, antipasto salad, cornmeal; Dessert: tarragon soda, vanilla pastilla, cashews, cranberries; Contestants: Greg Ling, Consulting Chef, Wilmington, DE (eliminated after the appetizer); Drew Jackson, Private Chef, Los Angeles, CA (eliminated after the entrée); Garrett Pittler, Executive Chef, Chelsea Bistro, Nashville, TN (eliminated after the dessert); Kristin Beringson, Executive Chef, Holland House Bar & Refuge, Nashville, TN (winner)
250	12	"Chopped Chops"	Maneet Chauhan, Marc Murphy, and Amanda Freitag	November 18, 2014
Ingredients: Appetizer: rainbow carrots, black trumpet mushrooms, walnuts, frog legs; Entrée: sombrero pasta, garbanzo beans, sun-dried tomatoes, pork chops; Dessert: dulce de batata, apple cinnamon cereal, la tur cheese, grappa; Contestants: Licia Kassim, Executive Chef, Mashmomack Fish & Game, Pine Plains, NY (eliminated after the appetizer); Liz Sempervive, Executive Sous Chef, Jamonera, Philadelphia, PA (eliminated after the entrée); Gilbert Delgado, Sous Chef, The Fat Radish, New York, NY (eliminated after the dessert); Dean Rucker, Private Chef, Malibu, CA (winner)
251	13	"Pesto Chango"	Aarón Sánchez, Amanda Freitag, and Geoffrey Zakarian	November 25, 2014
Ingredients: Appetizer: chicken cutlets, Thai chiles, pesto sauce, kohlrabi; Entrée: spirulina chips, jumbo head-on shrimp, red pearl onions, ruby crescent potatoes; Dessert: chak-chak, wolf river apples, Camembert cheese, sour cherry nectar; Contestants: Sassan Rostamian, Executive Chef, Sauce on Hampton, Los Angeles, CA (eliminated after the appetizer); Ryan Costanza, Chef de Cuisine, Post & Beam, Los Angeles, CA (eliminated after the entrée); Bryon Freeze, Executive Chef, Circa, Los Angeles, CA (eliminated after the dessert); Elderoy Arendse, Executive Chef, Tender Greens, Los Angeles, CA (winner); Notes: Each contestants is a chef from Los Angeles, California. Given the simplicity of the appetizer basket, Ted advised the chefs to focus on creativity in the first round.

== See also ==
- List of Chopped: Canada episodes
