= Knife Fight (TV series) =

- Genre: Reality; Competition; Cooking show
- Presented by: Ilan Hall; Giovanni Reda
- Country of origin: United States
- Original language: English
- No. of seasons: 4
- No. of episodes: 72

Production
- Executive producers: Drew Barrymore; Nancy Juvonen; Ilan Hall; J.C. Begley; Lauren Lexton; Kevin Johnston; Rich Kim; Tom Rogan
- Camera setup: Multi-camera
- Running time: 30 to 60 minutes (including commercials)
- Production companies: Flower Films; Authentic Entertainment

Original release
- Network: Esquire Network
- Release: September 24, 2013 – December 29, 2015

Knife Fight is an American reality cooking competition television series on Esquire Network. It was set to premiere April 23, 2013, but was pushed to September 24, 2013, to coincide with rebranding of the now-defunct Esquire. Knife Fight was hosted by season 2 Top Chef winner Ilan Hall and executive produced by Drew Barrymore. The show ran for four seasons.

== Synopsis ==
Originally set in Hall's restaurant The Gorbals in downtown Los Angeles, this secret underground happening took place during the overnight hours when restaurants close their doors to the public. This kind of competition has not been (nor meant to be) televised. In the show's premise, two talented cooks were selected to prove who's the best. They're cheered and heckled by a rowdy crowd of celebrities, restaurant critics, die-hard foodies, and sometimes each other. The chefs are given 1-3 mandatory ingredients, such as pig heads, jackfruit, and live catfish. They're given one hour to prepare at least two dishes, but may prepare more. The chefs may plate and present dishes at any time during the hour. The winner of each episode earns "bragging rights" as well as a cleaver with "I Won" written on it. The loser receives a smaller cleaver with "I Almost Won" written on it. In rare cases where picking the winner is too close to call, the 2 chefs go through a "Sudden Death" round where they make a dish in 5 minutes.

Former Top Chef contestant CJ Jacobson revealed on his podcast that the show was originally going to be named Food Fight Club after the David Fincher film Fight Club.

== Episodes ==
=== Series overview ===
Season	Episodes	Originally released	
Season	Episodes	First released	Last released
1	18	September 24, 2013	November 19, 2013
2	23	April 15, 2014	October 7, 2014
3	12	May 26, 2015	July 14, 2015
4	15	November 10, 2015	December 29, 2015

=== Season 1 (2013) ===
No. overall	No. in season	Title	Original release date
1	1	"Collins vs. Feau"	September 24, 2013
Featured are Brendan Collins, known for his underground British gastropub Waterloo and City, and David Feau, an executive chef of The Royce at The Langham, who compete in a unique culinary competition with celebrity judges and culinary experts. Special Guests: Eric Wareheim, Jeanne Kelly, and Bijou Phillips.
2	2	"Morningstar vs. Jacobsen"	September 24, 2013
A cooking competition between Mercantile's chef and renowned cooking veteran, CJ Jacobsen, and his friend from Ray's and Stark Bar's, Kris Morningstar; highlights include white truffles, kohlrabi, ridgeback shrimp and a powerful allergy. Special Guests: Lou Amdur and Bad Religion’s Brett Gurewitz
3	3	"Kobayashi vs. Arrington"	October 1, 2013
Elijah Wood judges as Nyesha Arrington ("Top Chef") takes on James Beard nominee Chris Kobayashi in a battle of Hawaiian Kampachi and braised lamb neck.
4	4	"Neroni vs. Toft"	October 1, 2013
Two of the hottest new chefs face off as Eater Chef of the Year Jason Neroni takes on Jordan Toft in a battle of big-eye tuna. Will Jason’s last-minute handmade pasta deliver him the big win? Guests include Patrick Fugit.
5	5	"Fullilove vs. Boudet"	October 8, 2013
Chef Jason Fullilove’s artistic cuisine takes on Brandon Boudet’s rustic cooking style. Guest Judges: Erika Christensen, Amy Scattergood, Eric Koston.
6	6	"Rocco vs. Herndon"	October 8, 2013
Chef Trevor Rocco of Red Hill looks to seek revenge on Umami Burger’s John Herndon as they tackle Japanese yams and Maitake mushrooms. Guest Judges: Lou Amdur and Bill Esparza
7	7	"Paderno vs. Santana"	October 15, 2013
Los Angeles chefs Amar Santana and Mirko Paderno make a bet that leaves one of them up to his ears in potatoes and cooking with whole pig’s head. Guest Judges: Elijah Wood, Krista Simmons and Beth Riesgraf.
8	8	"Page vs. Trees"	October 15, 2013
Chefs James Trees and Christian Page break down an entire goat. Guest Judges: Chefs Eric Greenspan and Octavio Becerra.
9	9	"Pereira vs. Lee"	October 22, 2013
Chef Phillip Frankland Lee takes on chef Natalia Pereira in a cooking contest in which each participant must prepare at least two dishes in a single hour while incorporating at least two or three secret ingredients, including radishes and foie gras. Guest Judges: Evan Kleiman and Stephane Bombet
10	10	"Strubel vs. Mairinger"	October 22, 2013
Chef Jeremy Strubel takes on chef Bernhard Mairinger in a contest in which each participant must prepare at least two dishes in a single hour while incorporating at least two or three secret ingredients, including chestnuts, jackfruit and haggis. Guest Judges: Actor Jason Lee, Lisa Arch, Quinn Hatfield
11	11	"Oh vs. Lieberher"	October 29, 2013
Chris Oh of Seoul Sausage seeks revenge on Wes Lieberher of Beer Belly and Sirtaj Beverly Hills in a contest in which each must make two dishes in one hour using Brussels sprouts and cow tongue, with guest judges Michael Midgley and chef David Feau (from the show's debut episode).
12	12	"Shuman vs. Abell"	October 29, 2013
Chef Neil Shuman of the Xen Lounge takes on chef Tim Abell, chef and owner of the farm-to-table Flatiron Truck, in a cooking contest in which each must prepare at least two dishes in a single hour, incorporating manila clams and Berkshire pork loin.
13	13	"Baumgarten vs. Wexler"	November 5, 2013
Will the competitive spirit of chef Amanda Baumgarten earn her the win against L.A. Magazine’s ‘2012 Chef of the Year,’ Micah Wexler? The mandatory ingredients are shark and rambutan. Guest Judges: Lisa Arch and Quinn Hatfield
14	14	"Zarate vs. Becerra"	November 5, 2013
Chef Octavio Becerra goes to bat against chef Ricardo Zarate. Tonight they work with turkey, monkfish liver and spiny lobster. 'Guest Judges: Elia Aboumrad and Eddie Lin
15	15	"Kalman vs. Richter"	November 12, 2013
Chefs Stefan Richter and Bruce Kalman fight with oysters, quail and nasturtiums. Guest Judges: David Feau, Lesley Balla and Rhys Coiro
16	16	"Travi vs. Kuramoto"	November 12, 2013
Comedian Bobby Lee keeps the crowd roaring as Jason Travi battles John-Carlos Kuramoto with trout roe, pork loin and clover. Guest Judges: Evan Kleiman and Stephane Bombet
17	17	"Trani vs. Abgaryan"	November 19, 2013
Chef Vartan Abgaryan battles Dustin Trani in a nerve-racking competition with lamb belly and live crawfish. Guests include: Michael Voltaggio and Mark Peel
18	18	"Lunetta vs. Fraser"	November 19, 2013
Actress and “Knife Fight” executive producer Drew Barrymore judges this epic battle between legendary chefs Raphael Lunetta and Neal Fraser. The mandatory ingredients are dry-aged ribeye, abalone, and Pacific Ocean trout.

=== Season 2 (2014) ===
No. overall	No. in season	Title	Original release date
1	19	"Whole Pig"	April 15, 2014
In a special hour-long season 2 premiere, the culinary hijinks continue as chef Tim Love of Texas and chef Mike Isabella of Washington, D.C., are asked to turn their considerable skills to breaking down an entire pig, but they also make a side bet involving tequila and a shoe. Guest Judges: Kris Morningstar and Naomi Pomeroy
2	20	"Oxtails"	April 22, 2014
Nerves come to the fore when Italian master chef Freddy Vargas of Scarpetta struggles to maintain his composure against modernist chef, and James Beard Foundation Award nominee, Justin Wills of Restaurant Beck in an oxtails showdown. Guest Judges: Kris Morningstar and Naomi Pomeroy
3	21	"Live King Crab"	April 22, 2014
Chef Brooke Williamson of Tripel in Los Angeles feels twice the pressure of having to contend with the very talented chef Chris Shepherd of Underbelly in Houston as well as trying to impress guest judge, Josiah Citrin, who was her old boss. Guest Judges: Krista Simmons and Josiah Citrin
4	22	"Cardoons"	April 29, 2014
Consistently inventive chef Johnny Zone of La Poubelle takes on former minor league pitcher turned innovative chef Michael Teich of The Wallace in a battle of Los Angeles centered around the unusual, and tough, ingredient of cardoon. Guest Judges: Naomi Pomeroy and Kris Morningstar
5	23	"Sea Snails"	April 29, 2014
Two of the culinary world's most reputable and influential chefs, Mark Peele of Campanile and Sal Mario of Il Grano, are forced to forgo their friendship and battle each other in what becomes a master class in cooking involving sea snails. Guest Judges: Krista Simmons and Josiah Citrin
6	24	"Sweetbreads"	May 6, 2014
Two representatives of the new guard in the food world, City Tavern's Jessica Christensen and Acabar's Kevin Luzande, find themselves in a heated competition as they try to establish their reputation with a menu including sweetbreads. Guest Judges: Naomi Pomeroy and Kris Morningstar
7	25	"Pig Ears"	May 6, 2014
The Pacific Northwest culinary crown is up for grabs as two Portland, Ore., chefs, Benjamin Bettinger of Imperial and Patrick McKee of Paley's Place, face off under the gaze of their mentor using pig's ears and rabbit as their ingredients. Guest Judges: Krista Simmons and Josiah Citrin
8	26	"Blood"	May 13, 2014
Tin Vuong of Abigaile pits his traditional style of Vietnamese cooking against Perry Cheung of Phorage's innovative twists on the cuisine in an unconventional battle that is not for the squeamish as the main ingredient is blood. Guest Judges: Krista Simmons and Brendan Collins
9	27	"Live Scallops"	May 13, 2014
Eric Park of Black Hogg in Los Angeles has the opportunity of a lifetime when he goes up against one of his culinary heroes, Kevin Gillespie of Gunshow in Atlanta, as they prepare scallops and pig's feet for a very special guest. Guest Judges: Nyesha Arrington, Kris Morningstar and Brett Gurewitz
10	28	"Bison"	May 20, 2014
New Orleans chefs, Sue Zemanick (Gatreau) and Tory McPhail (Commander's Palace) create bison dishes for the competition. Guest Judges: Krista Simmons and Brendan Collins
11	29	"Sea Cucumber"	May 20, 2014
In an Oregon vs. Southern California match, John Gorham and Kasey Mills of Portland, Oregon’s Toro Bravo step into the kitchen for a sea cucumber battle against Hungry Cat chefs, David Lentz (Santa Monica and Hollywood) and Kris Longley (Santa Barbara, California). Guest Judges: Krista Simmons and Brendan Collins
12	30	"Beef Forequarter"	July 29, 2014
Adam Sappington of Portland's Country Cat and Kansas City's Michael Smith (Michael Smith Restaurant and Extra Virgin) go head-to-head to tackle a forequarter of beef. After volunteering to butcher the meat, Sappington chooses the Tomahawk chop steak cut as one of his dishes. Guest Judges: Naomi Pomeroy and Brendan Collins
13	31	"Octopus"	July 29, 2014
Pitting Peruvian against Mexican flavors, Season 1 winner and 2014 James Beard Award semifinalist, Ricardo Zarate (Picca, Mo-Chica, Paiche, Blue Tavern) defends his title against The French Laundry alum and Santa Monica chef, Ray Garcia (FIG at the Fairmont Miramar Hotel). Guest Judges: Kris Morningstar and Naomi Pomeroy
14	32	"Eels"	August 5, 2014
2010 James Beard Award winner, Seattle’s Jason Wilson (Crush) is pitted against Portland friend and two-time award nominee, Greg Denton (Ox) over eels, juniper berries and gizzards. Guest Judges: Kris Morningstar and Krista Simmons
15	33	"Whole Goose"	August 5, 2014
Tandy Wilson, the two-time James Beard Award finalist (City House) is up against fellow Tennessee chef, Kelly English (Restaurant Iris and The Second Line). Loser of the goose battle loses not only the victory knife, but also their facial hair in a side bet. Guest Judges: Kris Morningstar and Krista Simmons
16	34	"Skate"	August 12, 2014
In another Southern California vs Northern California battle of chefs, Mary Sue Milliken (Border Grill, Los Angeles) and multiple winner of James Beard Foundation Awards, Traci Des Jardins (Jardinere, San Francisco) execute skate (fish) dishes. Guest Judges: Kat Odell, Brendan Collins, and Naomi Pomeroy
17	35	"Live Halibut"	August 12, 2014
Jason Paluska of Santa Barbara (The Lark) and Oakland’s Kyle Itani (Hopscotch) spar over live halibut. Guest Judges: Josiah Citrin and Naomi Pomeroy
18	36	"Flying Fish"	August 26, 2014
San Francisco chefs, Charles Phan (The Slanted Door) vies for the prize against Anthony Strong (Locanda Osteria & Bar) using the ingredients: prickly pear, burrata, monkfish and flying fish. Guest Judges: Naomi Pomeroy and Brendan Collins
19	37	"Whole Spring Lamb"	September 2, 2014
James Beard Award nominee of St. Louis, Kevin Nashan (Sidney Street Café and Peacemaker Lobster & Crab Co.) locks horns over whole spring lamb with New York City’s Harold Moore (Commerce). Guest Judges: Stacey Woods and Brendan Collins
20	38	"Calf’s Liver"	September 9, 2014
Los Angeles chefs, Ricardo Diaz (Colonia Taco Lounge) and Gilberto Cetina Jr. (Chichen Itza Restaurant) battle for Mexican cooking supremacy using calf liver. Guest Judges: Brendan Collins and Krista Simmons
21	39	"Silkie Chicken"	September 16, 2014
The battle of the protégés commences when Ricardo Zarate mentee, Brian Huskey, competes with Mei Lin, Michael Voltaggio's apprentice, to create a menu using an unusual ingredient, silkie chicken, that at least one judge finds disturbing. Guest Judges: Ricardo Zarate and Michael Voltaggio
22	40	"Live Spot Prawns"	September 23, 2014
A kitchen mishap nearly derails Kelly Liken as she takes on Steve Redzikowski in a showdown between two of Colorado’s best chefs. Guest Judges: Naomi Pomeroy and Brendan Collins
23	41	"Thousand Year Old Eggs"	October 7, 2014
Justin Devillier of La Petite Grocery in New Orleans takes on Michael Bryant of Los Angeles' The Churchill in a competition in which they have to create a winning menu using the unusual ingredient of thousand year old eggs. Guest Judges: Nyesha Arrington and Kris Morningstar
24	41	"Crickets"	September 30, 2014
Michelin-starred New York City chefs and business partners Edi Frauneder and Wolfgang Ban fight as rivals in a cooking showdown using crickets as a feature ingredient. Guest Judges: Brett Gurewitz, Kris Morningstar and Naomi Pomeroy

=== Season 3 (2015) ===
Round of 16
Pete Lipson	L
Dale Talde	W
Jonah Miller	L
Einat Admony	W
Todd Mitgang	L
Miguel Aguilar	W
David Felton	L
Leah Cohen	W
Wolfgang Ban	L
Edi Frauneder	W
Sean Telo	L
Franklin Becker	W
Daniel Holzman	L
Joey Campanero	W
Vincent Chirico	L
Tony Maws	W

Quarter-finals
Dale Talde	L
Einat Admony	W
Miguel Aguilar	W
Leah Cohen	L
Edi Frauneder	W
Franklin Becker	L
Joey Campanero	W
Tony Maws	L

Semi-finals
Einat Admony	L
Miguel Aguilar	W
Edi Frauneder	W
Joey Campanero	L

Final
Miguel Aguilar	L
Edi Frauneder	W

=== Season 4 (2015) ===
Round of 16
Corn, lemon verbena, turkey parts
John Daley	L
Quino Baca	W
Potatoes, freeze-dried cranberries, pickled herring
Bao Bao	L
Chris Cheung	W
Sichuan peppercorns, plantains, scungilli
Gary Anza	L
Kim Alter	W
Dragon-tongue beans, sour cherries, live soft-shell crabs
Tre Wilcox	L
Luis Bollo	W
Celtuce, tapioca, scorpion fish
Carrie Shores	L
J. J. Johnson	W
Stinging nettles, coxcombs, live Korean mudfish
Sean Brasel	W
John Tesar	L
Aged Porterhouse steak, red-veined sorrel, jellyfish
Ed McFarland	L
Joshua Henderson	W
Ginseng, Jamón ibérico, mahi-mahi
Jason Marcus	L
Angelo Sosa	W

Quarter-finals
Garlic scapes, grapefruit shandy, live sea eel
Quino Baca	W
Chris Cheung	L
Coffee, okra, lamb brains
Kim Alter	L
Luis Bollo	W
Horseradish root, morcilla, live black bass
J. J. Johnson	L
Sean Brasel	W
Hemp seeds, artichokes, duck testicles
Joshua Henderson	L
Angelo Sosa	W

Semi-finals
Honey, challah, raccoon
Quino Baca	W
Luis Bollo	L
Pine needles, poulet bleu, live uni
Sean Brasel	L
Angelo Sosa	W

Final
Nattō, branzino, soil, whole ostrich
Quino Baca	W
Angelo Sosa	L
