= Poule gasconne =

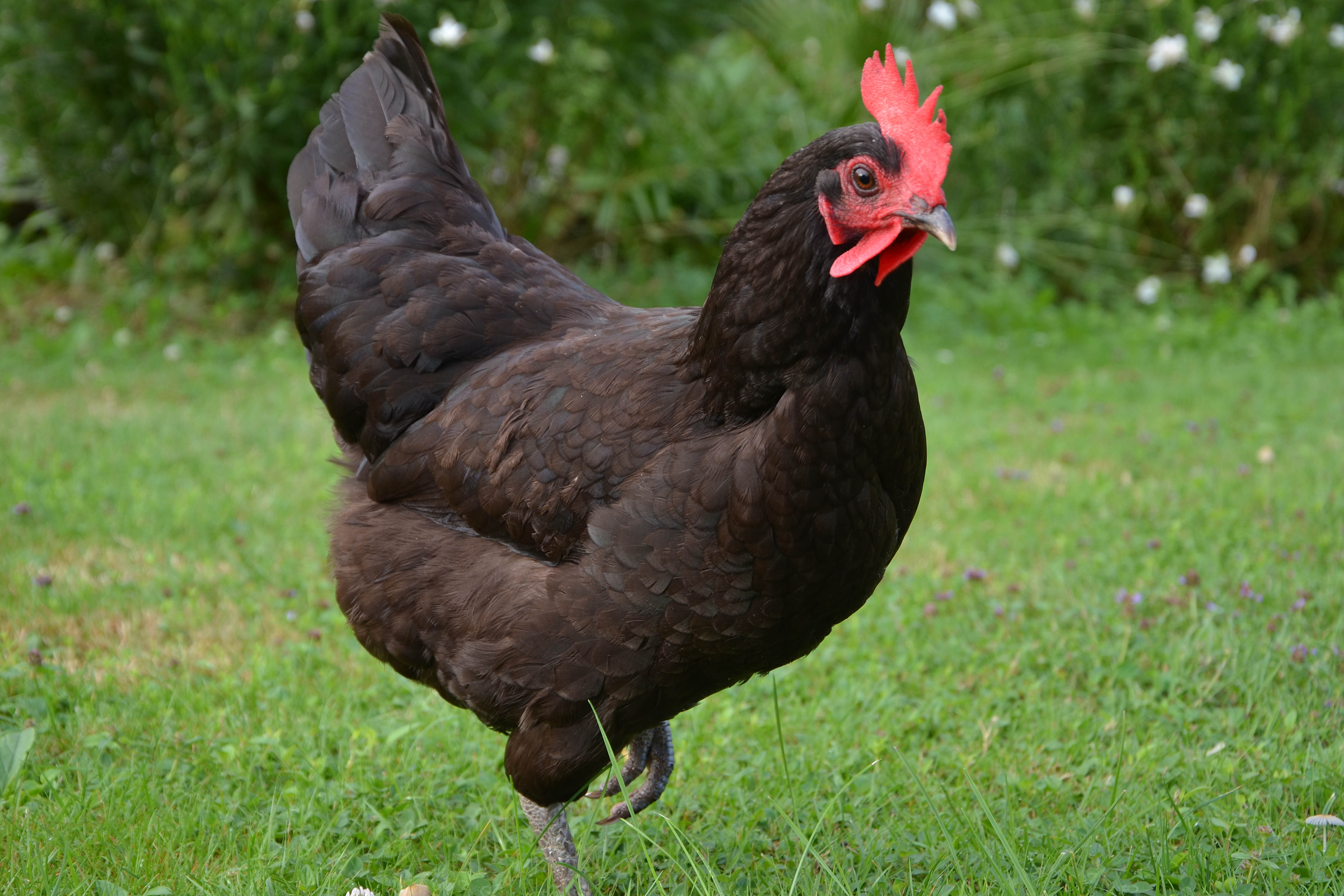
Gasconne hen

The Poule gasconne (French pronunciation: [pul ɡaskɔn]) is a French breed of chicken.

The Gascon hen was raised in the Garonne valley of Gascony, France for centuries. The breed originated from old French breeds of chicken. The breed began to be known in the sixteenth century because it is the one that is used to make the dish chicken in the pot which was advocated by Henry IV. The first documents relating to the breed date from 1860. At that time, its production was very important in the Gers, Haute-Garonne or Tarn-et-Garonne. Until the beginning of the 20th century, it was still confused with the Landes hen and the Caussade hen. The standard is defined several times from 1907 to 1920. Its performance, abundant meat level, egg laying and rusticity, are highlighted thanks to poultry exhibitions. It was at the time considered the best breed of French laying hens, according to a bulletin from the Société centrale d'aviculture de France (SCAF).

The breed decreased significantly in number during the 1950s, with the industrialization of agriculture and the creation of hybrid hens, better layers accepting much better difficult living conditions in battery cages. The breed nevertheless remains a very good layer, especially in the long term.

The number of Gascon hens is gradually rising thanks to the passionate breeders participating in poultry exhibitions, associations and their desire to perpetuate the French breeds.

In 2003, the association "La Poule Gasconne" was created. It brings together professionals and amateurs wishing to preserve, perpetuate and enhance the breed, by presenting chickens and roosters in poultry exhibition, by developing their number and by marketing products that come from them. The assets of the breed as well as a guarantee of quality are highlighted: outdoor breeding, low density of animals, slow breeding, etc.

In 2008, the Slow Food association, which is an awareness-raising movement for eco-gastronomy and alter-consumption, recognized the taste qualities of the breed and made it one of its sentries of taste.

In 2009, the owner of the seasonal slaughterhouse "Tradition des coteaux du Pelon in Miélan" worked with three breeders to set aside 1,500 chicks to produce capons of the breed especially for Christmas. The capons take eight months to mature. After slaughter, some of its feathers are left on after "dry plucking", a method done for poultry consumed for special occasions. It is finally wrapped in a cloth dyed with locally produced woad.

In 2012, the association "La Poule Gasconne" registered the trademark "Noire d'Astarac-Bigorre" as well as the signature that accompanies it: "gasconne, fière et gourmande".
