= Bresse (disambiguation) =

Bresse is an area and former province in eastern France.

Bresse may also refer to:

- The Bresse Gauloise breed of chicken, which within the area of Bresse is known as "Bresse"
- The poulet de Bresse, an appellation d'origine contrôlée chicken product derived from the above
- Bresse Bleu or Bleu de Bresse, a blue cheese from the area
- Jacques Antoine Charles Bresse, French civil engineer

== Places ==
- La Bresse, a commune in the Vosges department in France
- Bresse-sur-Grosne, a commune in the Saône-et-Loire department in France

== See also ==
- Bressett
