= Brasey =

Brasey is a surname. Notable people with the surname include:

- Édouard Brasey (born 1954), French writer
- Patrice Brasey (born 1964), Swiss ice hockey player

== See also ==
- Brasel
