= Devillier =

Devillier is a French surname. Notable people with the surname include:

- Justin Devillier (fl. 2003–2016), American chef
- Phillip DeVillier (born 1976), American politician

== See also ==
- De Villiers, a similar surname
