= Blue Foot =

Breed of chicken

- Other names: Poulet Bleu
- Country of origin: Canada
- Standard: none
- Use: meat

Traits
- Comb type: red

Classification
- APA: not recognised

Notes
- blue legs and feet
- Chicken; Gallus gallus domesticus

The Blue Foot or Poulet Bleu is a Canadian chicken hybrid bred to resemble the French Poulet de Bresse.

== History ==
The Blue Foot was bred by Peter Thiessen of British Columbia and was intended to provide an alternative to the French Poulet de Bresse, a chicken product from birds of the Bresse Gauloise breed raised and fed in a specific and traditional way within a strictly defined area in France. It was developed over a period of 15 years starting in the 1980s. The Canadian stock was destroyed in 2004 during the avian flu scare. Some stock in California survived.

== Characteristics ==
The birds are white, with a red comb and steel-blue feet.

== Use ==
Blue Foot chickens are typically slaughtered much later than industrially produced stock, being left to grow for longer. They require 14 to 16 weeks to reach market size. After slaughter, the chickens may be air-chilled.
