= Brasel =

Brasel is a surname. Notable people with the surname include:

- Nancy E. Brasel (born 1969), American judge
- Sean Brasel, American chef and restaurant owner

== See also ==
- Brasey
