= Poularde Albufera =

Chicken dish

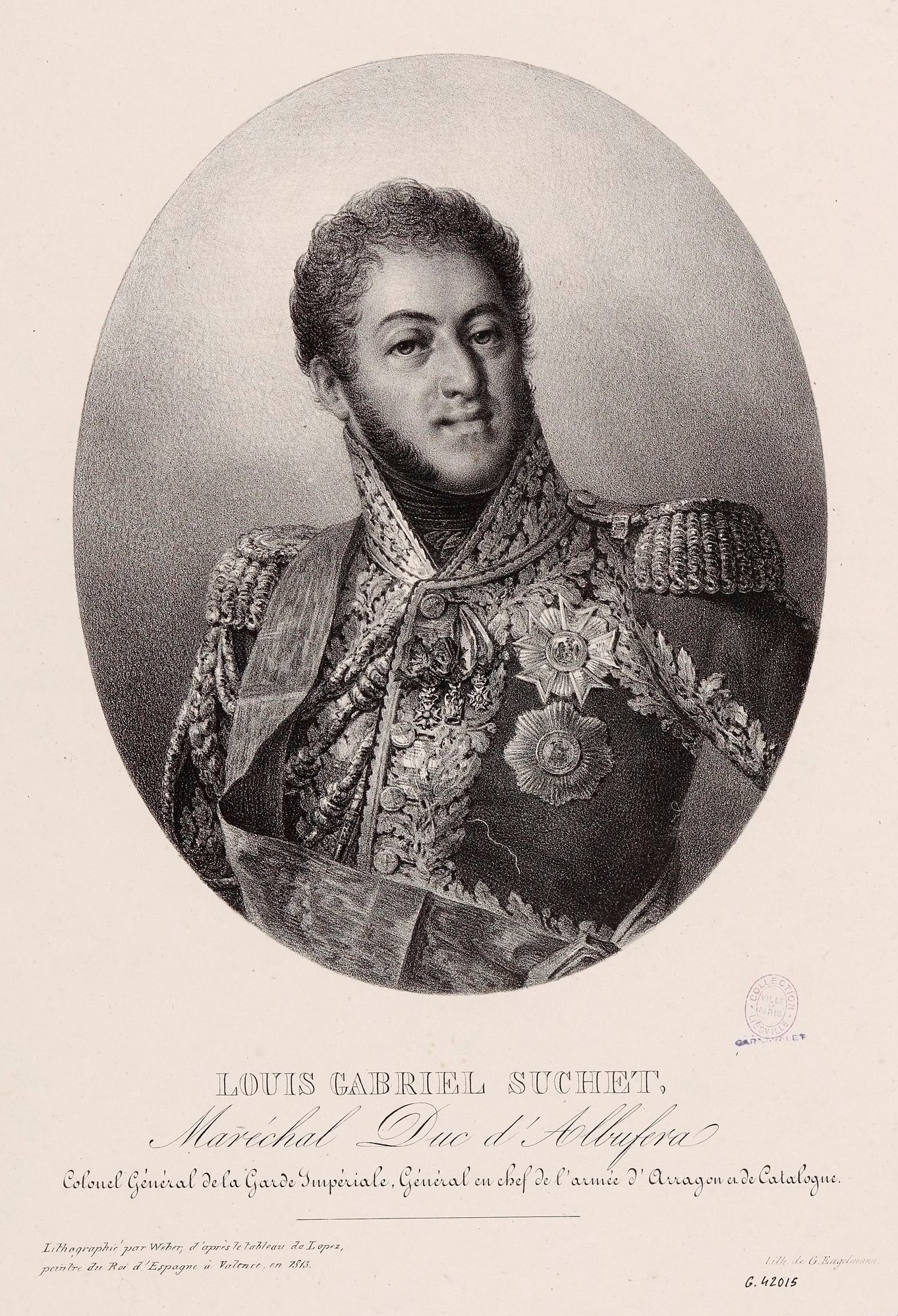
Louis-Gabriel Suchet, Duke of Albufera

Poularde Albufera (Albufera Pullet) is a chicken dish attributed to French chef Adolphe Dugléré which was named in honour of the Duke of Albufera. It consists of poached chicken (poularde) with a garnish of vol-au-vents filled with quenelles, cocks' kidneys, mushrooms and truffles in Albufera sauce.

== See also ==
- List of chicken dishes
