= Bressett =

Bressett is a surname, originating from Normandy. Notable people with the surname include:

- Kenneth Bressett (born 1928), American numismatist.

== Fictional characters ==
- Bressett, played by Fritz Odemar in the 1934 film Charley's Aunt

== See also ==
- Bresset
- Bresse (disambiguation)
