= Poularde =

Culinary term for chicken

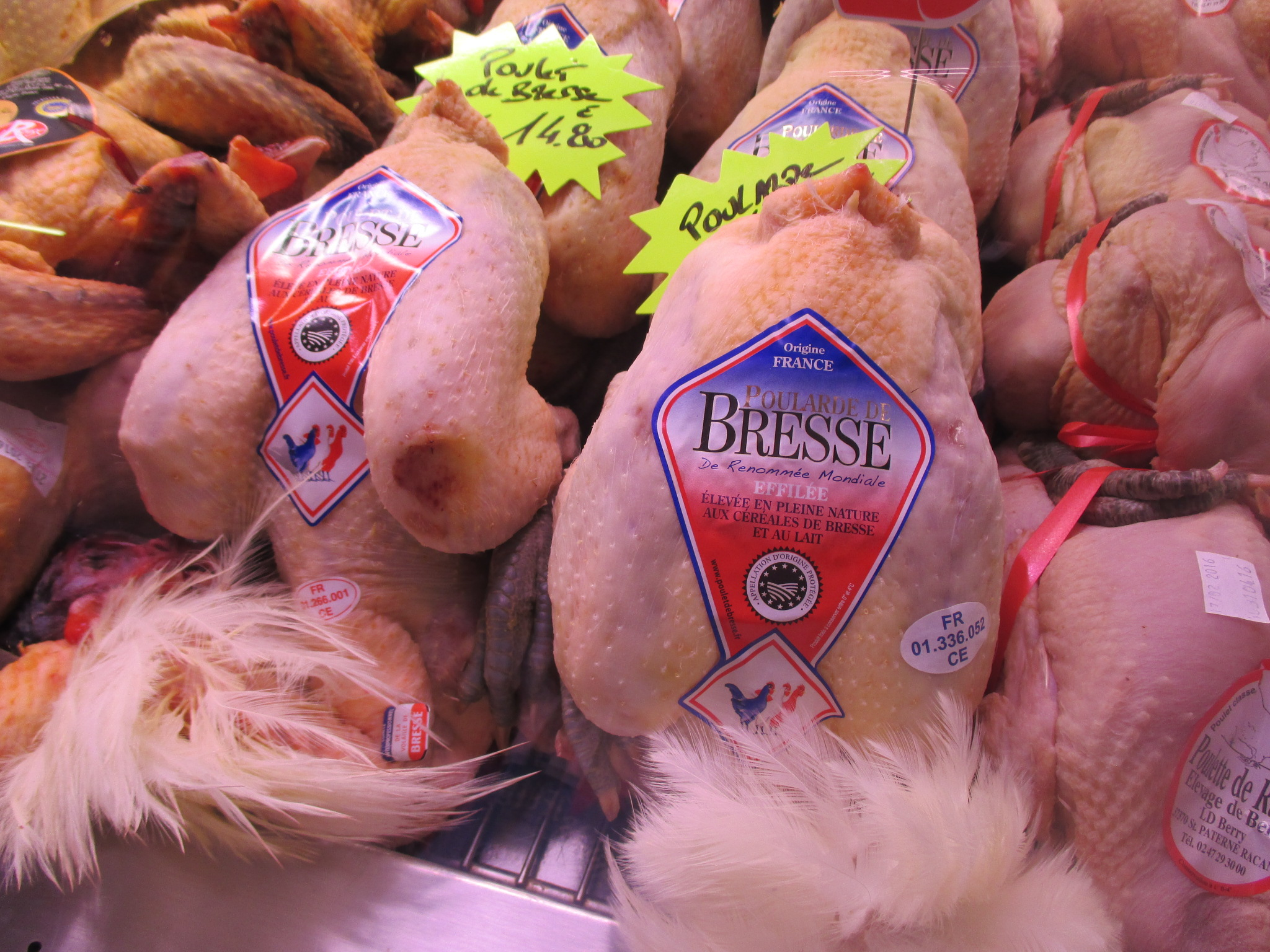
Poularde de Bresse

Poularde is a culinary term for a chicken that is at least 120 days old at the time of slaughter and fattened with a rich diet that delays egg production. In the past it was common to spay the chickens early in life to ensure desirable meat quality, similar to the castration of a capon.

Similar terms are often confused: in English, pullet refers to a young hen, generally under one year old. Sometimes it is more specific, indicating a hen that is fully grown but has not reached 'point-of-lay', i.e. has not yet started laying eggs, which often happens between 16 and 24 weeks of age, depending on breed. Poulard (no 'e') can be used to mean "roaster", i.e. a young chicken weighing up to 6 to 7 pounds (2.7 to 3.2 kg) and living 10–12 weeks, as opposed to smaller "broiler" chickens weighing less than 3 pounds (1.4 kg). In French, poussin is a newly hatched chick (either sex), poulet is a young chick (either sex), poulette is a young female chicken (one form of a poulet, and corresponding to the male coquelet), poularde is a poulette deliberately fattened for eating (often spayed, and the equivalent of the castrated male chapon or capon), and a poule is an egg-laying hen (corresponding to the coq or cockerel). Poularde is used in English in the context of cooking (as opposed to poultry farming); Larousse Gastronomique lists around 98 recipes for "Poulardes et poulets" with a further 100 or more for "farm-raised chickens".

In France many varieties of poularde exist, including the Poularde de Bresse, the Poularde du Mans and the Poularde de Loué, which are generally protected by the AOC or Label Rouge certifications. The high price of these chickens meant that they were traditionally reserved for holiday meals, such as Christmas feasts.

Examples of protected certifications outside France include the Poularde de Bruxelles from Belgium, the Steierische Poularde from Austria, and the Poularde Den Dungen from the Netherlands.

== See also ==
- Capon
- Poultry
- Poularde Albufera
- List of chicken breeds
- List of chicken dishes
