= Société centrale d'aviculture de France =

French poultry association

The Société centrale d'aviculture de France (SCAF) is a French non-profit poultry association affiliated with the Ministry of Agriculture and recognized as being of public utility by a ministerial decree of July 16, 1912.

The SCAF brings together amateur breeders of backyard animals (waterfowl, gallinaceous birds, pigeons and also rabbits) and more ornamental animals (ornamental birds, dwarf rabbits, guinea pigs, bantam chickens).
