= La Petite Grocery =

Coordinates: 29.9208°N 90.1000°W

La Petite Grocery is a neighborhood eatery located in Uptown New Orleans, Louisiana. Open since 2004, the restaurant features south Louisiana French-inspired cuisine. The restaurant's director of culinary and owner is Justin Devillier, along with his wife, Mia Devillier. The executive chef is Joseph Tiedmann since 2019.

La Petite Grocery's name originates from Frank Vonderhaar's 1937 market called "the little grocery store". When La Petite Grocery opened in 2004, it paid homage to the Vonderhaar family with its restaurant name.

In 2007, Food & Wine magazine noted La Petite Grocery as "A neighborhood spot you could revisit every week … we loved: bouillabaisse of gulf seafood."

In 2025, was given a Michelin recommendation by the Michelin Guide.
