= Édouard Brasey =

French writer

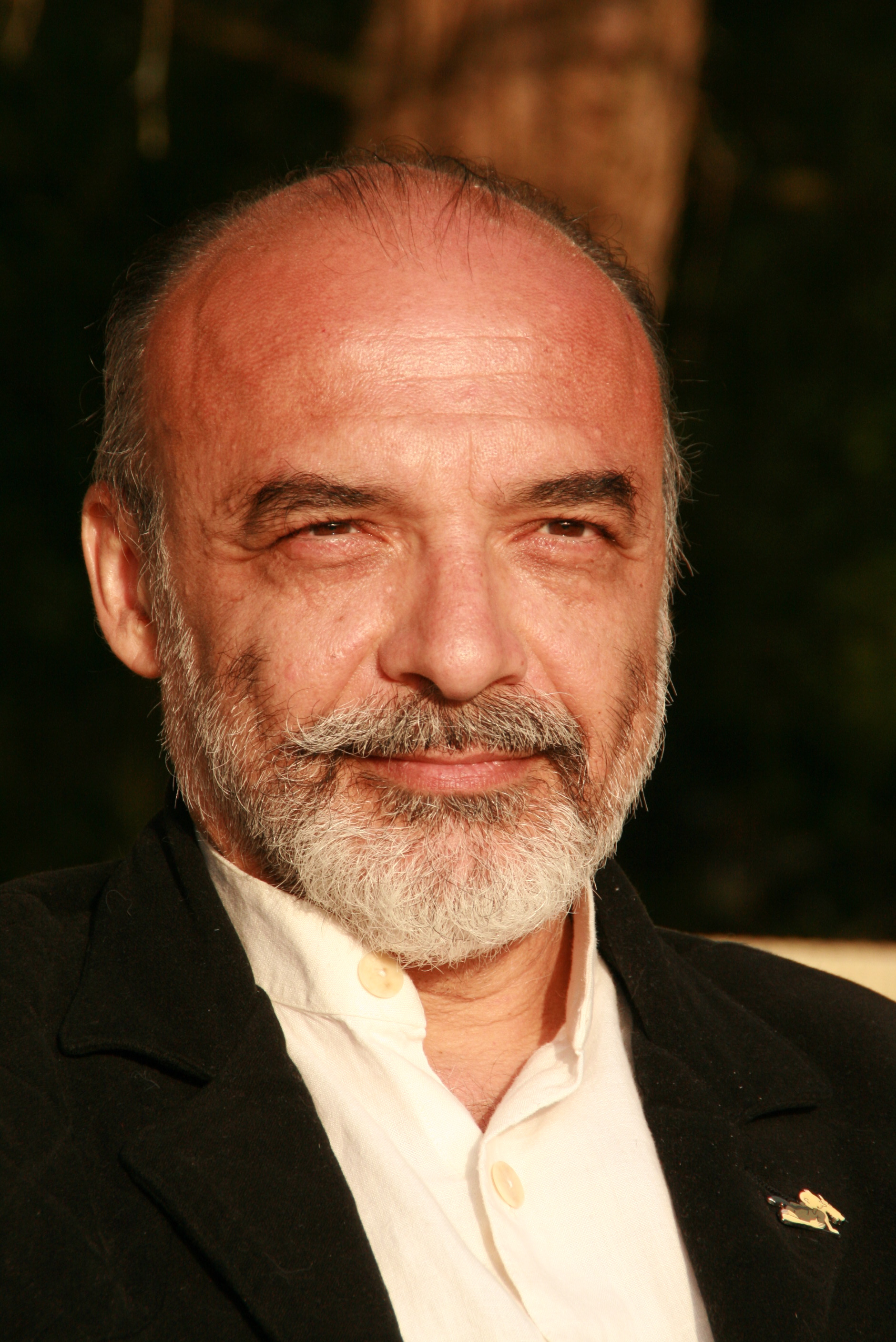
- Édouard Brasey in 2008
- Born: 25 March 1954 (age 72); Marseille, France
- Occupations: Novelist (thriller, crime, historical novels)
- Writing career
- Notable works: Le Dernier Pape (2012); Les Lavandières de Brocéliande; La Malédiction de l'Anneau; L'Encyclopédie du Merveilleux
- Notable awards: Prix Imaginales (Special Prize of the Jury 2006); Prix Merlin 2009 (Category Novels)

Édouard Brasey (born 25 March 1954) is a French novelist, essayist, scriptwriter and story-teller born on 25 March 1954. Author of more than seventy works, many of which have been translated into English, Russian, Japanese, Spanish, Portuguese and Italian. He specialises in the themes of the esoteric, fables, legends and fantasy. He won a prize of Imaginales in 2006 for La Petite Encyclopédie du Merveilleux, and a prize Merlin in 2009 for his novel La Malédiction de l'Anneau. Subsequently, he has become essentially a novelist, notably published by Calmann-Lévy. His historical-esoteric thriller that was published in 2013, Le Dernier Pape, anticipated the abdication of Benoît XVI.

== Biography ==
Édouard Brasey was born on 25 March 1954 in Marseille. He has been interested in the imaginary since his childhood. He has an entry in Who's Who in France and is member of Mensa International.

=== Qualifications and Career in Journalism, Radio and TV ===
Graduating from the ESSEC Business School (École Supérieure des Sciences Economiques et Commerciales), he gained a Master in Private Law at Lyon II-Lumière, a Diploma of the Institut d'Etudes Politiques of Lyon, and a Master in Cinema Studies and Scriptwriting (Paris I-La Sorbonne), with the directors Éric Rohmer et Jean Rouch as professors. He also trained in the theatre, in story-telling and in commedia dell'arte. He has been a journalist for Lire, L'Expansion, Challenges, Livres Hebdo, Le Monde de la musique, Le Figaro Madame and L'Usine Nouvelle. He writes regularly for the review Historia, edits reviews of historical crime novels, and collaborates in special features concerning witchcraft, the devil, medieval legends, superstitions, pirates or fairy-tales. He collaborates in publications of Historia dedicated to the works of the illustrator Hergé, Tintin et les Forces Obscures and Tintin et la Mer. He was finalist for the New York Festival Best World's Radio Program 2015 with "The Night Washerwomen", extract from two series of ten short radio programs for the French Radio channel Radio Bleu, "The Little Folk of Halloween" and "The Little Folk of the Legends". He plays an "expert in superstitions" for the French TV channel France 2.

=== Career as a Writer ===
Édouard Brasey is the author of nearly seventy works since 1987, comprising investigative documents, essays, chronicles, fictionalised biographies, novels, monographs, collections of fables and illustrated art books. His works address the themes of the invisible world and spirituality, religions and pagan (notably Celtic) beliefs, fables and legends, and the fantastic.

==== Investigative Essays ====
His first investigative essay, published in 1987 by Ramsay, was dedicated to the literary journalist Bernard Pivot. Favourably received, it was qualified by Philippe Schuwer in Communication et Langages as « a study that approaches hagiography without having the faults ». Édouard Brasey thereupon interested himself in the esoteric with l'Enquête sur l'existence des Anges Rebelles in 1995 and the Enquête sur l'Existence des Fées et des Esprits de la Nature in 1996, published by Filipacchi and J'ai Lu.

==== Literature of the Imaginary ====
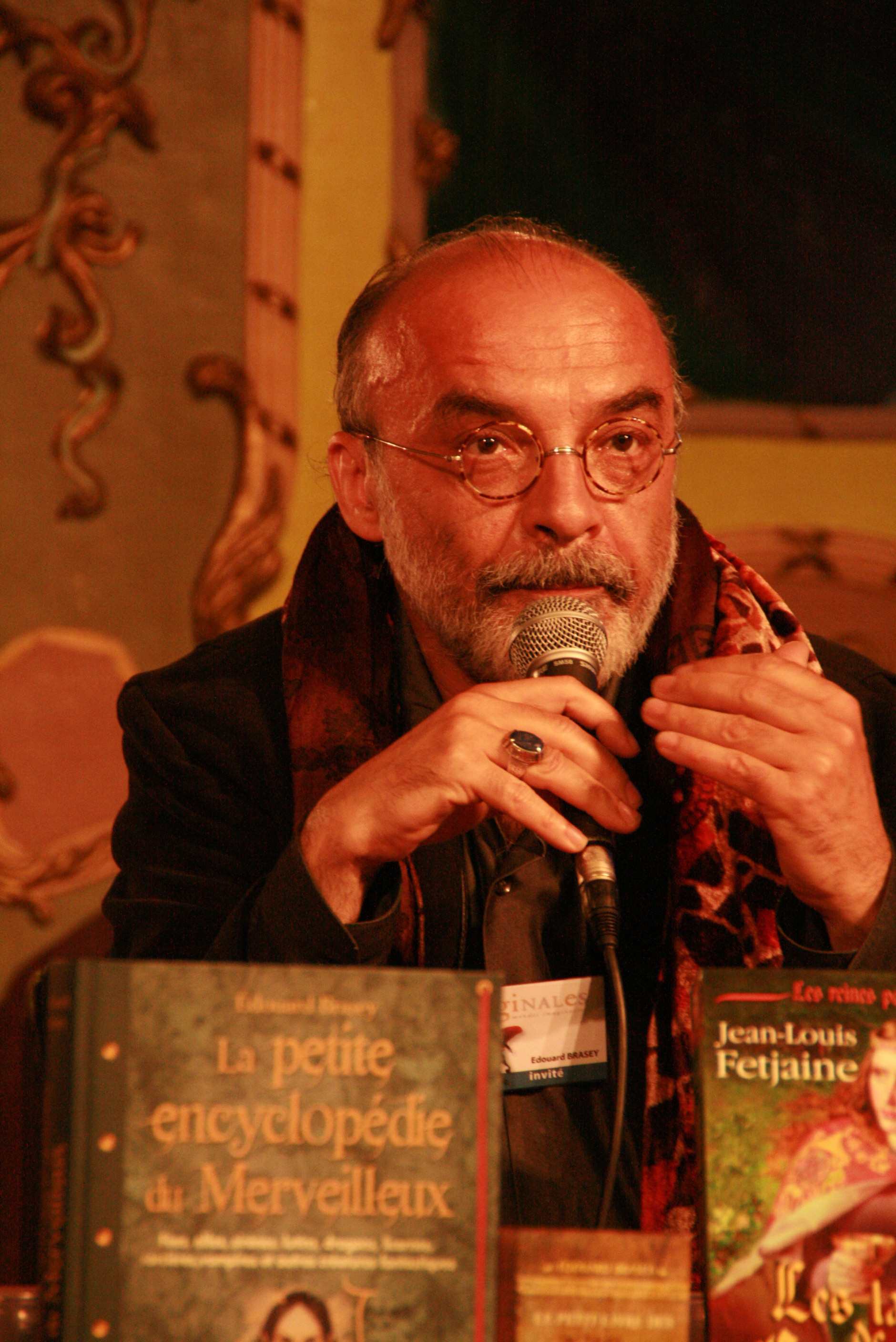
Édouard Brasey at Imaginales 2008.

In 1995, the writer specialised in the domain of legends, notably following an apprenticeship with the story-teller Henri Gougaud. Between 2005 and 2012 he wrote a collection of fables, Le Cabinet Fantastique, as well as collections of fantasy, French fiction, esoteric writings, essays and illustrated books at Éditions Le Pré aux Clercs. He authored numerous publications in this domain.

==== Novels ====
He has also published twelve novels since 1994, in the fields of thriller, crime novel, historical novel or story inspired by legend.

===== Le Dernier Pape =====
In Le Dernier Pape (The Last Pope, Éditions Télémaque 2013, Amazon Kindle e-book 2012 and 2014), the pope is dead. While the pretenders to his succession intrigue in the corridors of the Vatican, gruesomely bloody ritual murders profane places of worship, an atrocious homage to the martyrdom of Saint Peter. Two thousand years ago, the apostle cast on Rome, the place of his torture, a curse that seems ready to accomplish its purpose: a cosmic menace is about to eliminate the seat of Christianity.

This esoteric thriller is inspired notably by the prophecy of Malachie, and the prophecy of the third secret of Fátima. Édouard Brasey published Le Dernier Pape in March 2012 in electronic format at Amazon under the title La Prophétie de Pierre, generating 3000 downloads in three months. He subsequently published it with Éditions Télémaque in January 2013, anticipating by a few weeks the abdication of Pope Benoit XVI, which occasioned numerous articles and interviews in the national and international press. In 2014 Édouard Brasey published an update to his novel in electronic format under the definitive title Le Dernier Pape et la Prophétie de Pierre, to integrate the latest developments concerning the Vatican, notably the election of Pope François. The book is regularly classified among the best-sellers in electronic format on the platforms Amazon.com and Amazon.fr., the new edition generated more than 2000 downloads in two months.

For Israel Hayom, Edouard Brasey, "a science-fiction writer known for penning thrillers", this novel is eerily similar to the real-life events unfolding in the Vatican. The book's protagonist is a pope who finds himself in the middle of numerous scandals, yet even a sci-fi guru like Brasey couldn't stretch his imagination to the point where he envisioned the pontiff resigning from his post [...] I wrote this book in 2011 amidst all of the scandals that were being discussed at the time, and which were vividly manifest this past summer with the Vatileaks affair". The newspaper insists of the fact that "Brasey, a former journalist, was the most sought-after pundit in France this week. Everyone wondered how he managed to sniff out such a significant scoop and present his readers with the story of a troubled pope, so similar to real life. (...)"

Corine Pirozzi, The Huffington Post, tells that "Édouard Brasey entices us into an adventure totally captivating, fascinating in its occult accents and gives birth to an esoteric thriller of high quality". "Édouard Brasey has just published a book that presents strange coincidences with actual events at the Vatican. Ex-journalist converted to writing fantastic novels, Édouard Brasey has not given up getting scoops." Philippe Vallet, on the radio France Info, 3 February 2013, think that "The Vatican will always light up the imagination of novelists. Witness Edouard Brasey who has published (...) a thriller which mixes the illness of a Pope, the intrigues for his succession, senseless murders and a cosmic menace. A novel researched and fascinating." For Julie Malaure, « Quand le pape se meurt », Le Point, 31 January 2013 "those who (...) thrill with excitement at each revelation made about the Vatican, who twitch at the evocation of secrets that deliberately obscure the Church, will find a great pleasure of reading in this esoteric thriller. Because the prolix Brasey (...) here shows all his generosity." Franck Ferrand of Europe 1 sees this novel as "written exactly in the line of Anges et Démons by Dan Brown". He salutes the action scenes and the numerous references, the "Renaissance décor of Saint Peter and the Vatican" alternating with "ultra-modernity", adding only the overall impression and inspiration « "conspirator", but only "that which is proper to all these big novels. We are squarely in a conspiracy theory".

===== Historic and legendary novels =====
Les Lavandières de Brocéliande (Editions Calmann-Lévy, 2012, Le Livre de Poche, 2014). With Les Lavandières de Brocéliande, Edouard Brasey inaugurates a new genre, that of historic and legendary novels of the earth, inspired by popular beliefs, in which the action takes place in Brittany: during All-Saints Day, 1943, Gwenn, a young orphan, discovers one of her fellows, a washerwoman, drowned in the washing basin of Concoret, a small village on the edge of the forest of Brocéliande. Dahud, the oldest inhabitant, and mother of the victim, incriminates the washerwomen of the night, these supernatural creatures that, according to Breton legends, wash the bloody clothes of their still-born infants. The malediction continues to haunt the washerwomen of Brocéliande. This novel has been favourably received by Le Courrier Indépendant. it's followed with Les Pardons de Locronan and La Sirène d'Ouessant His next novel, due to appear with Calmann-Lévy in 2015, is a crime novel in which the action takes place in Haute Provence at the beginning of the 1960s, L'Affaire de la Cabre d'Or.

===== Fantasy =====
On 20 June 2009 Édouard Brasey received the Prix Merlin in the novels category for Les Chants de la Walkyrie, the first volume of the cycle La Malédiction de l'Anneau (Belfond editions, 2008 - 2010). He received a bursary for creation from the Centre National du Livre for his writing. Valeurs Actuelles writes that "Édouard Brasey makes the ancient Nordic sagas sing, the legend of the powerful Ases and the magnificent Vanes. A remarkable work that holds together a fantastic narrative and lyric poetry". For Nicolas L., SciFi-Universe, 24 November 2008, "eminent French specialist in the universe of fairies, folklore, myths and legends, Édouard Brasey offers us, with La Malédiction de l'Anneau, the fruit of a colossal work of compilation carried out from diverse sources, such as l'Edda, La Saga des Völsung or l'Anneau du Nibelung." Plume-libre.com insists on the "titanic work where we sense the love of Édouard Brasey for all that touches from near or from far the imaginary and the fantastic, to take on such a monster might seem a little reckless but the author knew how to respond to the challenge with brio and brings us a new insight into a myth that has not finished making us dream."

==== Encyclopédia ====
L'Encyclopédie du Merveilleux (Editions Le Pré aux Clercs, 2005, 2006, 2007 et 2012) collects more than creatures of surnatural world: fairies, elves, imps, mermaids, dwarfs, dragons, unicorns, griffons, gargoyles, werewolves, vampires trolls, Cyclopes, giants, ogres, titans... with their description, their geographic and mythological origin, their habits and their history. The sources of this work were found in history, legends, Celtic, Greek-Roman, Germanic or Nordic mythology, literary or cinematographic creations. This work is made up of three volumes: Des peuples de la Lumière, Du Bestiaire Fantastique and Des Peuples de l'Ombre (2005 and 2006), re-edited into a single volume entitled La Petite Encyclopédie du Merveilleux in 2007 and La Grande Encyclopédie du Merveilleux in 2012. It earned him a double recognition at Imaginales d'Épinal in 2006: the Imaginales Special Jury Prize, and the Claude Seignolle Prize for the images. The first volume has been translated into English for Five Mile Press by a Melbourne-based Australian translator, Lorraine DAVID, under the title The Encyclopedia of Fantasy – People of Light. More than 100,000 copies of this work were sold, all editions included. These works, accessible to all, have improved the knowledge of the marvellous in France. Jacques Baudou, Le Monde, 21 October 2005, writes "Re-enchant the world": this slogan, borrowed from the preface of this encyclopaedia, entitled "Once upon a time it was marvellous", could well define better than a long discussion the task engaged here and which must be followed to its conclusion in several volumes." For Le Figaro, "Édouard Brasey is a major specialist of the genre. "

Démons et Merveilles (Éditions Le Chêne 2002, 2006 and 2010), Faeries and Demons (Barnes & Noble, New-York, 2003), Dragons, Little People, Witches, Fairies, Trolls and Elves (Hachette UK Illustrated, London, 2003). This illustrated Encyclopedia tells the stories and legends of the enchanted kingdom - most notably in the spooky ghostliness of All Hallows Eve. Each of the four seasons has particular celebrations and this book aims to bring some of the background to these rituals and traditions. Quotations and references also feature from Shakespeare, Walter Scott and J. R. R. Tolkien.

== Scriptwriter for audio-visual and live arts (television, radio, screen adaptation, theatre) ==
Édouard Brasey is also a scriptwriter for televised documentaries, theatre and story-telling dramas and musical comedies. He has notably participated in several documentaries on historical or esoteric subjects:

- Le Sorcier Habite l'Immeuble, documentary with J.-C. Deniau, 52 minutes, France 2, 30 October 1989.
- Les Années Algériennes, historical documentary series de Benjamin Stora, 4 x 52 minutes, France 2, October 1991.
- Des Anges, des Démons et des Hommes, documentary with J.-C. Deniau, 70 minutes, France 3, August 1995.
- Il était une Fée, documentary with Bernard Jourdain, 52 minutes, France 2, 9 May 1999.

He has written a musical comedy for children, A la Recherche d'Alandys, for Les Monts Rieurs in 2002, and co-authored with his wife, Stéphanie Brasey, a second musical comedy, L'Enfant tombé de la Lune for Les Monts Rieurs, 2012. Also with his wife, Stéphanie Brasey, he has co-authored La Porte des Secrets, a screen adaptation for Paimpont inspired by the legends of the forest of Broceliande.

== Actor ==
As an actor, Édouard Brasey has made several appearances in films and television films, notably :

- Les nuits de la Pleine Lune, Éric Rohmer, 1984.
- Dionysos, Jean Rouch, 1984.
- Nathalie, Anne Fontaine, 2003.
- Joe Pollox et les Mauvais Esprits, Jérôme Foulon, 2004.
- La Main du Diable, Jérémy Grammatica, 2010.
- Jean Moulin, Yves Boisset, 2002.
- Avocats et Associés, Affaires de Famille, Marion Jourdan – Le Sens du Devoir, Mauvais Esprit, Ciné-Cinémas special *Fables and Legends, Ciné-Cinémas special Vampires.

== Storyteller ==
As a story-teller, he has created several fables:

- La Mémoire de Merlin
- La Forêt Enchantée.
- Chercheurs de Vérité.
- Les Sept Portes des Mille et Une Nuits.

== Bibliography ==
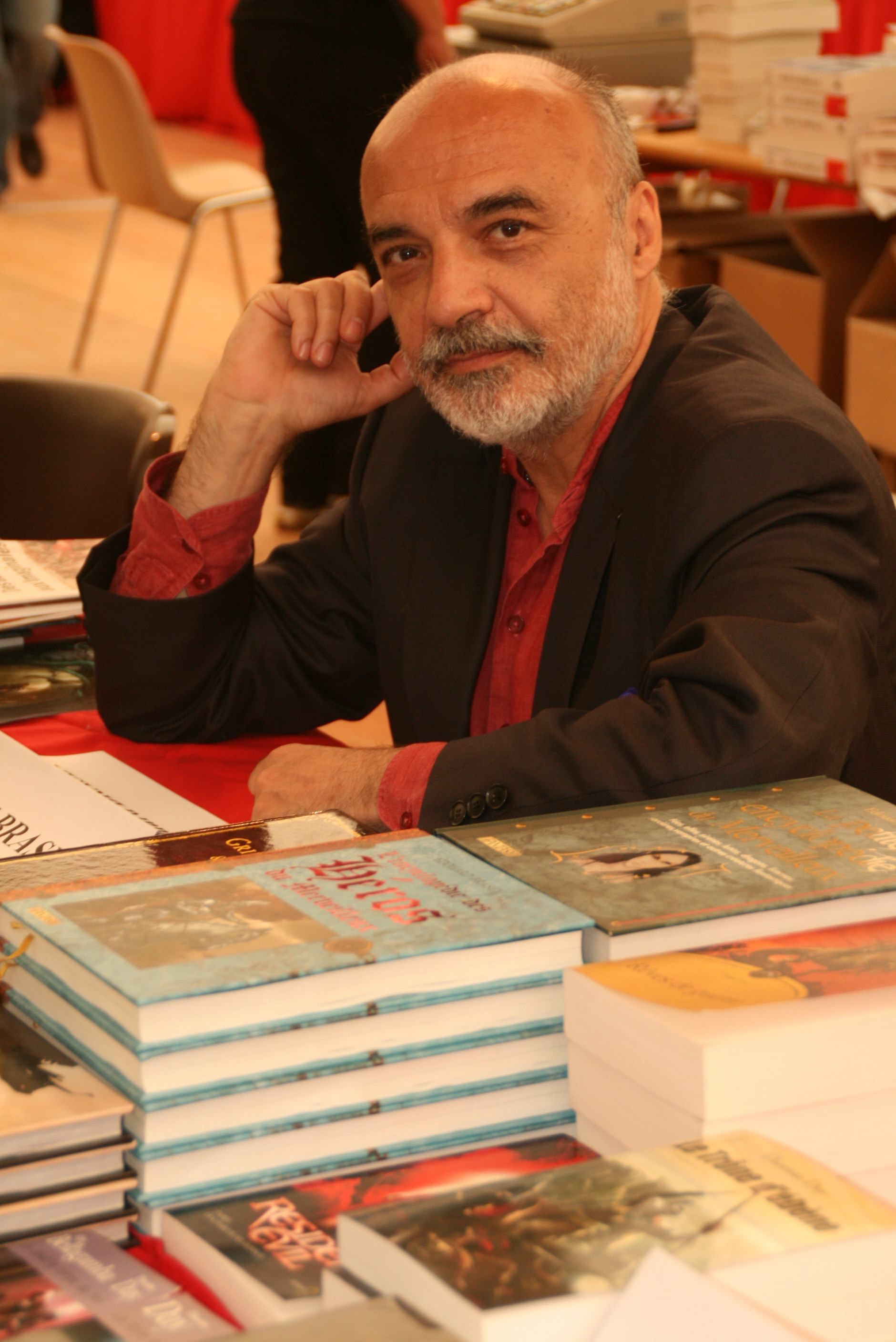
Édouard Brasey at salon du livre de Paris 2010.

=== Thrillers and Mysteries ===
- Le Dernier Pape et la Prophétie de Pierre
  - La Prophétie de Pierre, Amazon, 2012 (ISBN 979-1091386005)
  - Le Dernier Pape, éditions Télémaque, 2013, 352 p. (ISBN 978-2753301665)
  - Le Dernier Pape, France Loisirs, 2013 (ISBN 978-2-298-07780-3)
  - Le Dernier Pape et la Prophétie de Pierre, 2014 (ISBN 979-1091386005)

=== Historic and legendary novels ===
- Les Lavandières de Brocéliande, Calmann-Lévy, 9 May 2012, 450 p. (ISBN 978-2702143223)
- Les Pardons de Locronan, Calmann-Lévy, 3 May 2013, 480 p. (ISBN 978-2-7021-5346-8)
- La Sirène d'Ouessant, Calmann-Lévy, 8 May 2014, 380 p. (ISBN 978-2-7021-4482-4)

=== Fantasy ===
- La Malédiction de l'anneau
  - Les Chants de la Walkyrie, Belfond, 2 October 2008 (ISBN 9782714444349)
  - Le Sommeil du dragon, Belfond, 17 May 2009 (ISBN 9782714445438)
  - Le Trésor du Rhin, Belfond, March 2010 (ISBN 978-2714446237)
  - La Malédiction de l'anneau, la trilogie, Belfond, October 2010, 896 p. (ISBN 978-2714448705)

=== Legends and Fairy Tales ===
- Le Bestiaire fabuleux, Pygmalion, 7 June 2001 (ISBN 9782857047056)
- Les Amours enchantées, Pygmalion, 25 September 2001 (ISBN 9782857047209)
- L'Amour courtois et autres histoires, Le Pré aux Clercs, coll. « Le cabinet fantastique », 24 August 2007 (ISBN 9782842282981)
- La France enchantée, Paris, La Martinière, 2011, 191 p. (ISBN 978-2732442143)

=== Other novels ===
- Quand le ciel s'éclaircira, Plon, 18 February 1994, 311 p. (ISBN 9782259000888)
- Le Vœu d'étoile, Le comptoir, 10 October 1996, 240 p. (ISBN 9782884560078)
- Rue de l'oubli ou Les ombres d'Istanbul, Autres Temps, coll. « Temps Romanesque », 1998 (ISBN 9782911873638)
- Les Loups de la Pleine Lune : Carnet retrouvé dans un manoir en ruines, Le Pré aux Clercs, 6 January 2005 (ISBN 9782842282233)

=== Essays et Encyclopediae ===
- Édouard Brasey and E. Debailleul, Vivre la magie des contes : Comment le merveilleux peut changer notre vie, Albin Michel, coll. « Les clés de la psychologie », 1 January 2000, 336 p. (ISBN 9782226095299)
- Trouver sa vérité par les contes de sagesse, Seuil, January 2000 (ISBN 9782702852019)
- Démons et merveilles, Le Chêne, 2002 (ISBN 9782842773861)
- La Lune, mystères et sortilèges, Le Chêne, 23 April 2003 (ISBN 9782842774141)
- Les Sept Portes des Mille et une nuits, Le Chêne, 24 September 2003 (ISBN 9782842774653)
- Les Univers de Jules Verne, Le Chêne, 16 March 2005, 240 p. (ISBN 9782842775940)
- La Cuisine magique des fées et des sorcières, L'Envol, coll. « Cartothèque », 30 June 2005 (ISBN 9782915349122). Avec une préface de l'elficologue Pierre Dubois
- Édouard Brasey, Jacques Bertinier and Sandrine Gestin, La Bonne cuisine des fées, Fetjaine, October 2007, 118 p. (ISBN 9782354250171)
- Edouard Brasey et Lucile Thibaudier, Grimoires, sortilèges et enchantements, le manuel du sorcier, Fetjaine, 18 October 2007, 119 p. (ISBN 978-2354250164)
- Grimoire des loups-garous, Paris, Éditions Le Pré aux Clercs, 2010, 432 p. (ISBN 9782842284107)
- Formules magiques de l'évangile des quenouilles, Paris, Le Chêne, 2010 (ISBN 9782812302206)
- Édouard et Stéphanie Brasey, Les Enquêteurs de l'étrange: Histoires vraies de maisons hantées, Éditions Le Pré aux Clercs, 2011, 271 p. (ISBN 978-2842284527)
- Édouard et Stéphanie Brasey, Traité de sorcellerie, Éditions Le Pré aux Clercs, 2011, 432 p. (ISBN 978-2842284473)
- Édouard et Stéphanie Brasey, Traité des arts divinatoires, Éditions Le Pré aux Clercs, 2012, 432 p. (ISBN 978-2842284787)

=== Journalism and investigation ===
- L'effet Pivot, Ramsay, 1987 (ISBN 9782859566371)
- Sorciers. Voyage chez les Astrologues, Envouteurs, Guérisseurs, Mages et Voyants, Ramsay, coll. « Document », 1989 (ISBN 9782859567446)
- La république des jeux, enquête sur l'univers secret des jeux d'argent et de hasard, Robert Laffont, 10 January 1992, 276 p. (ISBN 9782221070000)
- Enquête sur l'existence des anges rebelles, Filipacchi, 1 September 1995 (ISBN 9782850183980)
  - Reedition of Enquête sur l'existence des anges rebelles, J'ai lu, coll. « Aventure secrète », 1 November 1998 (ISBN 9782290044346)
- Enquête sur l'existence des fées et des esprits de la nature, Filipacchi, 1er September 1996 (ISBN 9782850183034)
  - Reedition of Enquête sur l'existence des fées et des esprits de la nature, J'ai lu, coll. « Aventure secrète », 4 janvier 1999 (ISBN 9782290047538)
- L'énigme de l'Atlantide, Pygmalion et, coll. « Mystère des mondes perdus », 12 November 1998 (ISBN 9782857045434)
  - Reedition of L'énigme de l'Atlantide, J'ai lu, coll. « Aventure secrète », 24 October 2002 (ISBN 9782290320938)
