= Bresse Gauloise =

French breed of domestic chicken

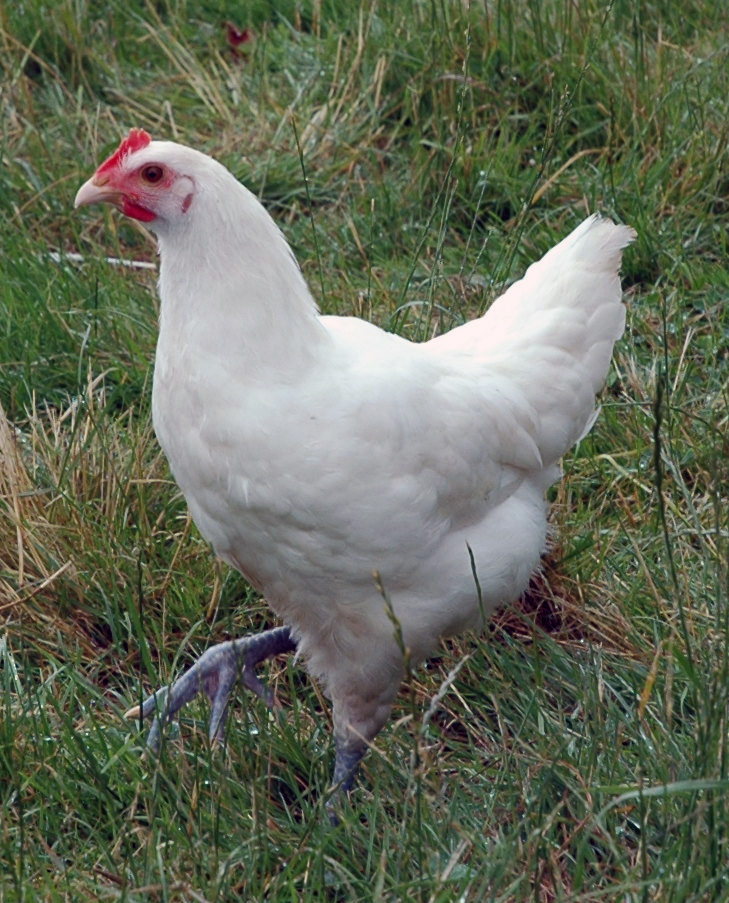
- White or Bresse de Bény, hen

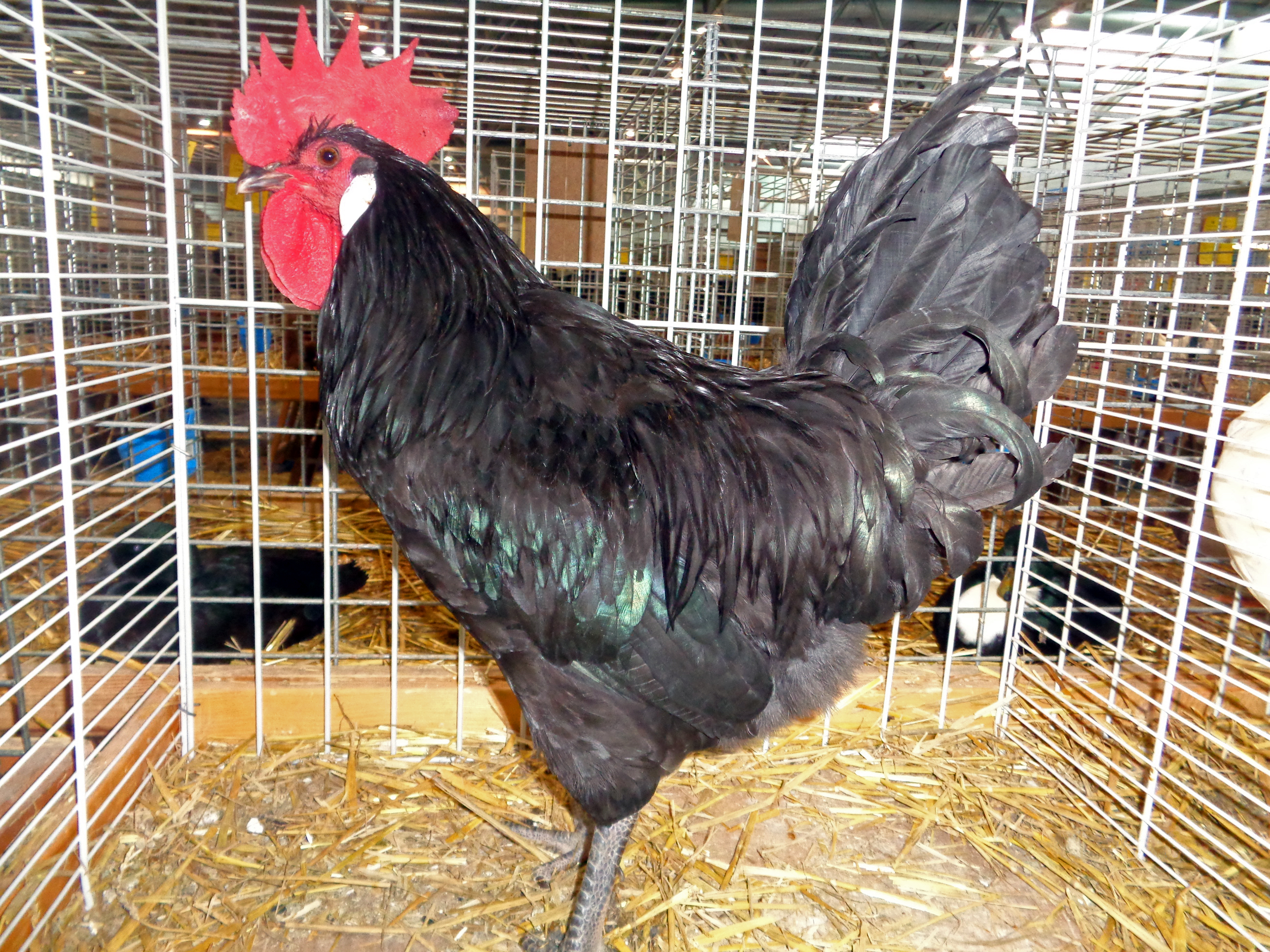
- Bresse Noire or Bresse de Louhans, cock
- Conservation status: FAO (2007): no data
- Other names: Bresse; La Bresse; Gauloise
- Nicknames: pattes-bleues
- Country of origin: France
- Distribution: Ain; Saône-et-Loire; Jura
- Standard: Bresse Gauloise Club
- Use: dual-purpose: eggs and meat

Traits
- Weight: Male: 2.5–3 kg; Female: 2–2.5 kg
- Skin colour: white
- Comb type: single comb

Classification
- APA: not listed
- EE: no
- PCGB: rare soft feather: light

Notes
- slate-blue legs
- Chicken; Gallus gallus domesticus

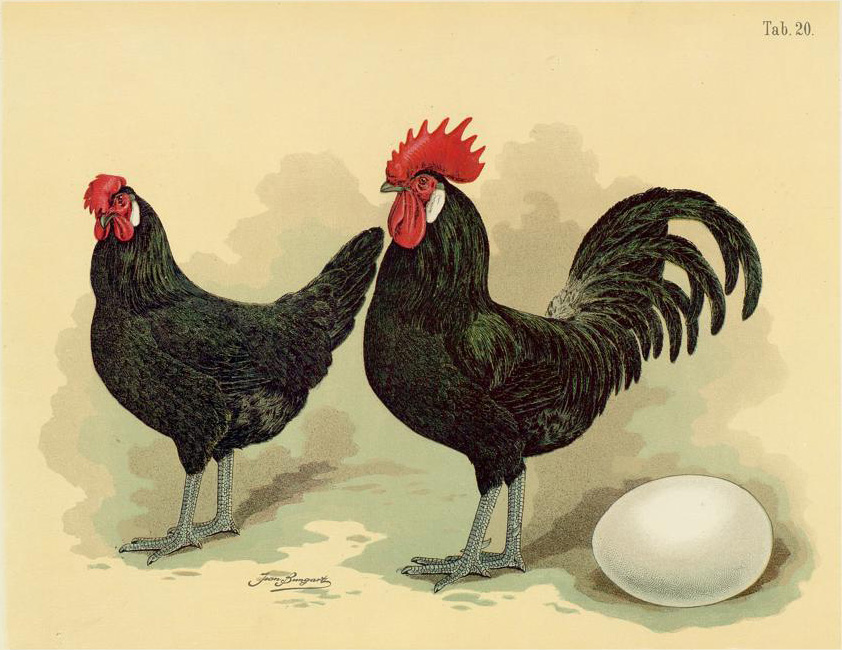
Illustration from the Geflügel-Album of Jean Bungartz, 1885

The Bresse Gauloise is a French breed of domestic chicken. It originates in the historic region and former province of Bresse, in the regions of Rhône-Alpes, Bourgogne and Franche-Comté, in eastern France. Because of legal restrictions on the use of the name, only white chickens raised within that area may be called "Bresse"; outside it, they are given the name "Gauloise"; the breed name combines both. Four colours are recognised for the Bresse Gauloise, three of them linked to areas within Bresse: the Bresse de Bourg is "grey" (silver-pencilled); the Bresse de Bény is white; the Bresse de Louhans is black; and a blue variety has recently been created. White Bresse de Bény chickens and capons raised in the area of Bresse have appellation d'origine contrôlée status and are marketed as poulet de Bresse; they are regarded as a premium product and command higher prices than other chickens.

== History ==
The first documented mention of the chickens of Bresse dates to 12 November 1591, when the citizens of Bourg presented two dozen birds to Joachim de Rye, Marquis de Treffort. In the early nineteenth century, the lawyer, politician, epicure and gastronome Jean Anthelme Brillat-Savarin (1755–1826), who was born at Belley in the Ain, is supposed to have described the Bresse chicken as "the queen of poultry, the poultry of kings". Like the La Flèche, which was raised and fattened in a similar fashion, the Bresse chicken had high standing in the market. Nevertheless, by about 1900 the breed had virtually disappeared. Its recovery was due to fancy breeders, who selectively bred a sufficient number of white chickens for the breed to become stable. A new breed standard was drawn up in 1904. The Bresse name, used for both chicken products and for the dinde de Bresse, the turkey of the area, received legal protection on 22 December 1936; this became an appellation d'origine contrôlée (AOC) in 1957.

== Characteristics ==
Four colours are recognised for the Bresse Gauloise, three of them linked to areas within Bresse: the Bresse de Bourg is "grey" (silver-pencilled); the Bresse de Bény is white; the Bresse de Louhans is black; and a blue variety has been created. The black and the white are recognised by the Poultry Club of Great Britain; all four colours are listed by the Entente Européenne d’Aviculture et de Cuniculture, but none are recognised.

== Use ==
White Bresse de Bény chickens and capons raised in the area of Bresse have appellation d'origine contrôlée status and are marketed as poulet de Bresse; they are regarded as a premium product and command higher prices than other chickens.

Although the Bresse Gauloise is principally famous as a meat breed, it is a good layer of large white eggs, which in the black Louhans variety may weigh 70 g. Hens are usually non-sitting.

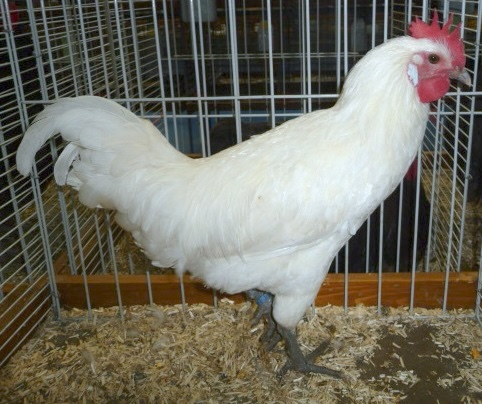
Bresse de Bény cock

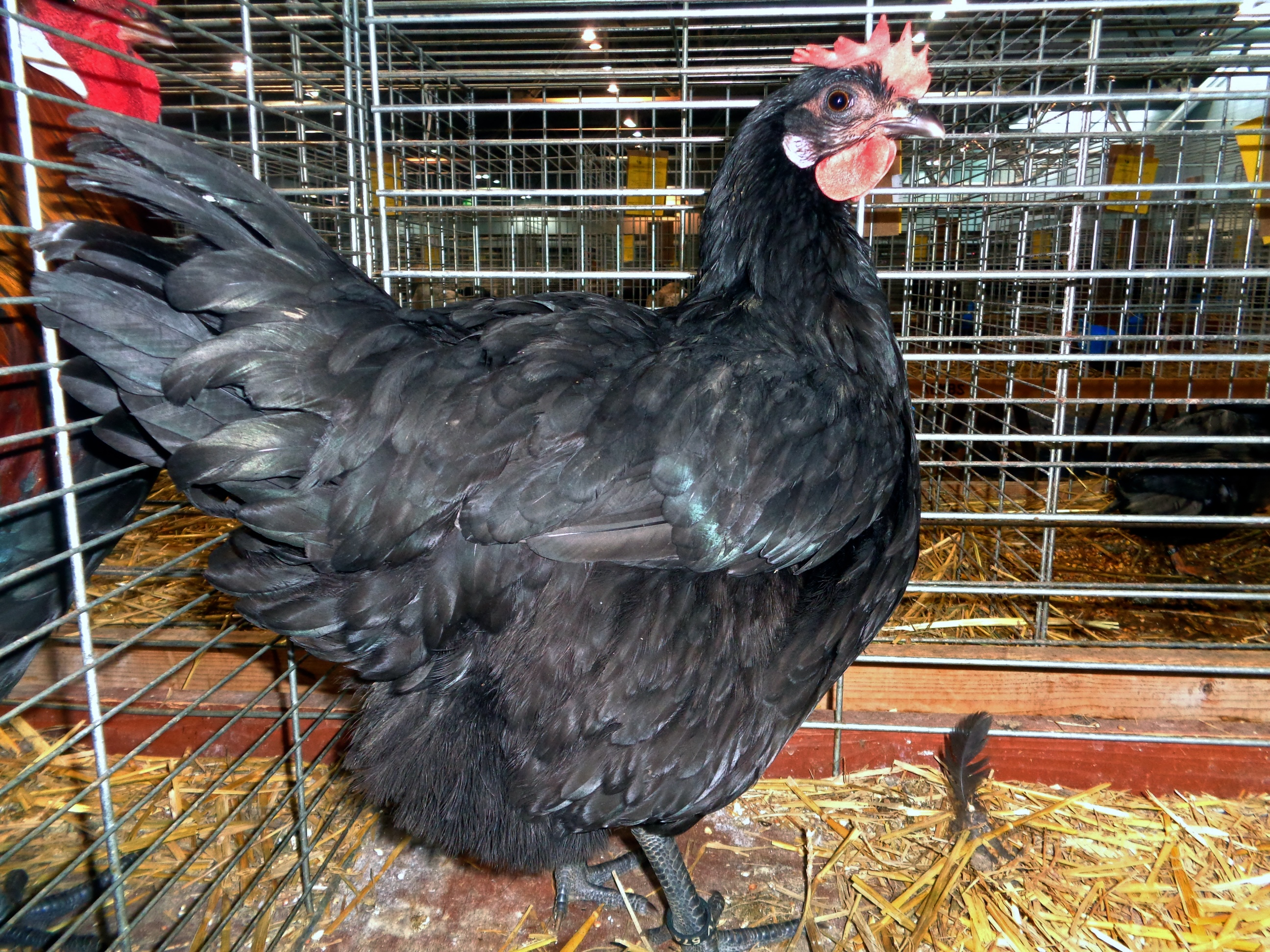
Bresse Noire hen
