= Sean Brasel =

American executive chef

- Born: Colorado, United States
- Occupation: Executive chef

Sean Brasel is an executive chef and part owner of Meat Market. Meat Market is a restaurant with locations in Miami Beach, Florida, West Palm Beach, Fl and San Juan, Puerto Rico. Sean Brasel is one of Miami's most renowned chefs. The food republic gave him the title as the "Grilling God" and he has also been crowned as Miami's Hopchef at Brewery Omegang's Throwdown.

The Miami New Times has this to say about him: "Brasel hardly needed any luck, voodoo, or any of that because he has a reputation in Miami Beach few can match. Perhaps you remember him as part of the crew that opened Touch nearly a decade ago? This Coloradoan began his career as a sous chef at Cliff Young's in Denver, working his way up the food chain until he landed on Lincoln Road in 2000."

Brasel was born in Colorado where he began as a sous chef at Cliff Young's in Denver. He relocated into South Florida where he established Touch restaurant along with his business partner David Tornek. Later on Brasel and Tornek sold that restaurant and focused on Meat Market, an American steakhouse.

Brasel has been featured on Knife Fight, a TV show on the Esquire Channel.
