= Justin Devillier =

American chef

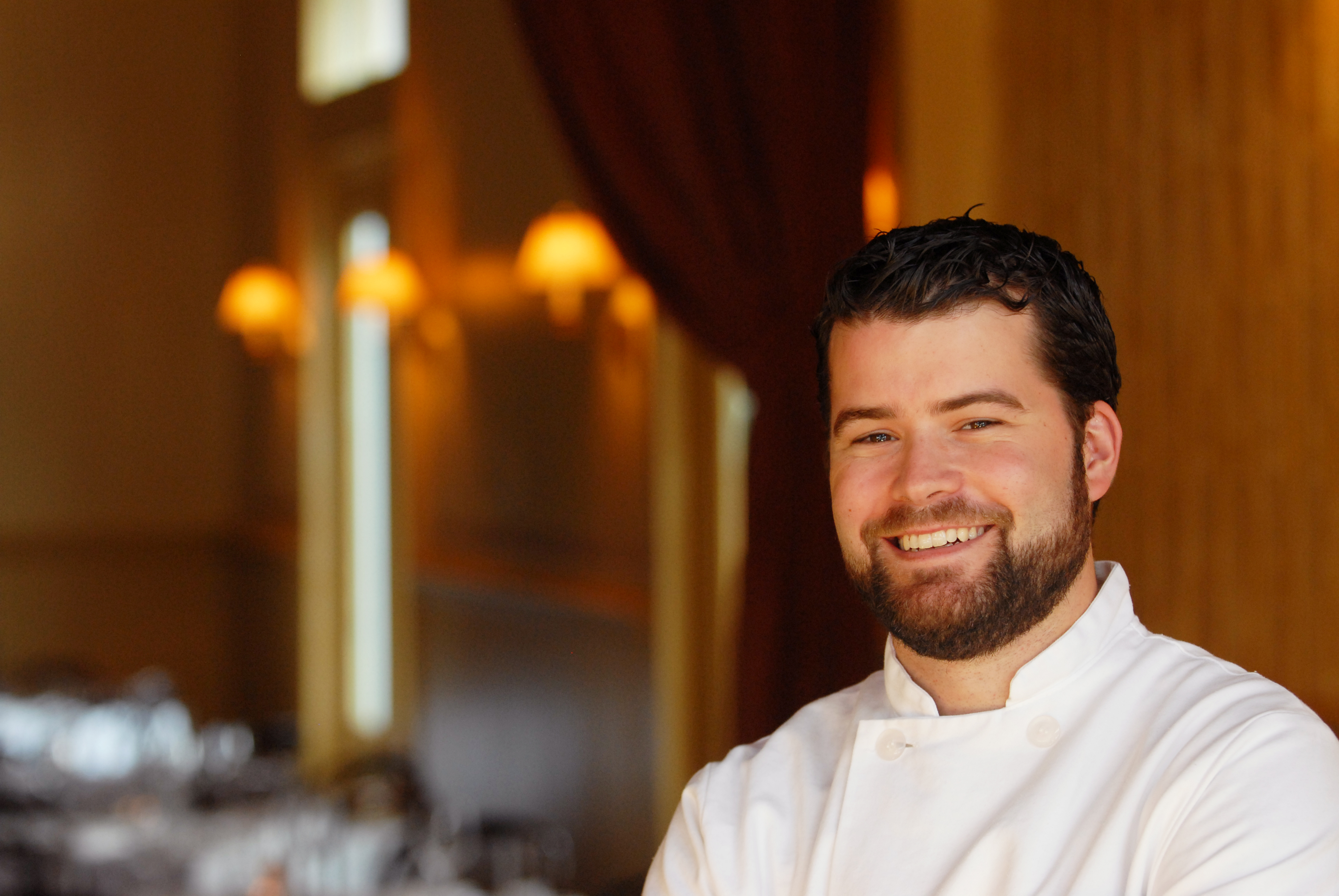
Justin Devillier at La Petite Grocery

Justin Devillier is an American chef currently residing in New Orleans, Louisiana. He was born and raised in Dana Point, California and has family roots in Louisiana.

In 2003, he moved to New Orleans and worked in the kitchens of Bacco, Stella, and Peristyle. While working at Peristyle, Devillier worked with Chef Anne Kearney and learned the techniques of French cuisine and was responsible for preparing daily charcuterie specials.

In June 2004, Devillier joined the restaurant staff at La Petite Grocery. He became a sous chef in October 2005. After Hurricane Katrina, Justin helped re-establish La Petite Grocery, managing daily specials and training new line cooks. In February 2007, he became the Executive Chef. Justin was named a 2008 Chef to Watch by Louisiana Cookin’ Magazine in August 2008 as well as a Chef to Watch by The Times-Picayune in 2008. Devillier “cooks in a manner so appropriate to New Orleans spirit: French bistro with a Southern twist.” Also, according to Zagat, Chef Justin Devillier makes "clever use of local ingredients in his expertly crafted Contemporary Louisiana-French dinners.". In May 2016, Devellier was named Best Chef: South at the annual James Beard awards.
