= Capon =

Castrated male chicken

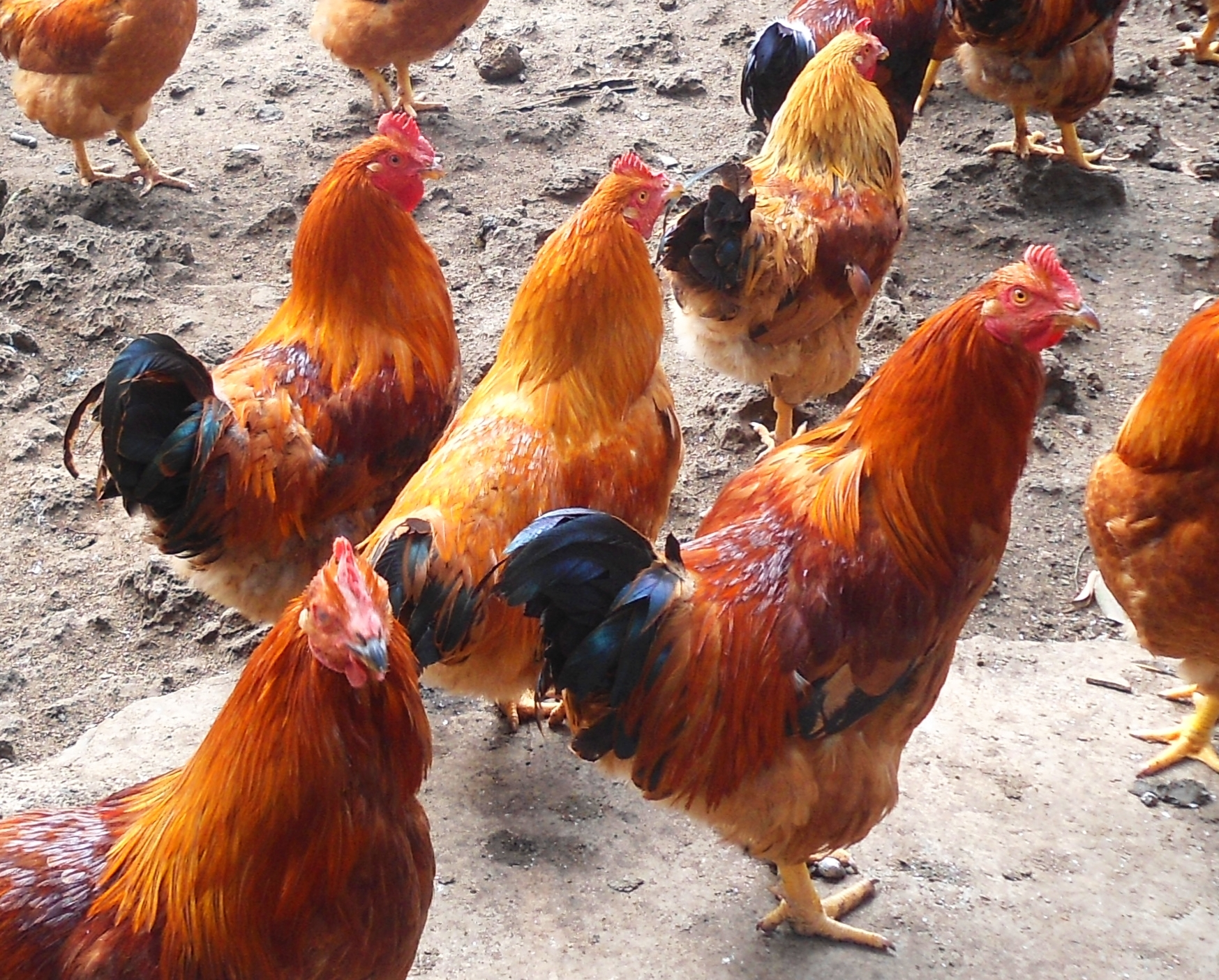
Live capons in Hainan, China, displaying characteristic small head, comb and wattle

A capon (from Latin: cāpō, genitive cāpōnis) is a male chicken that has been castrated or neutered, either physically or chemically, to improve the quality of its flesh for food, and, in some countries like Spain, fattened by forced feeding.

== History ==
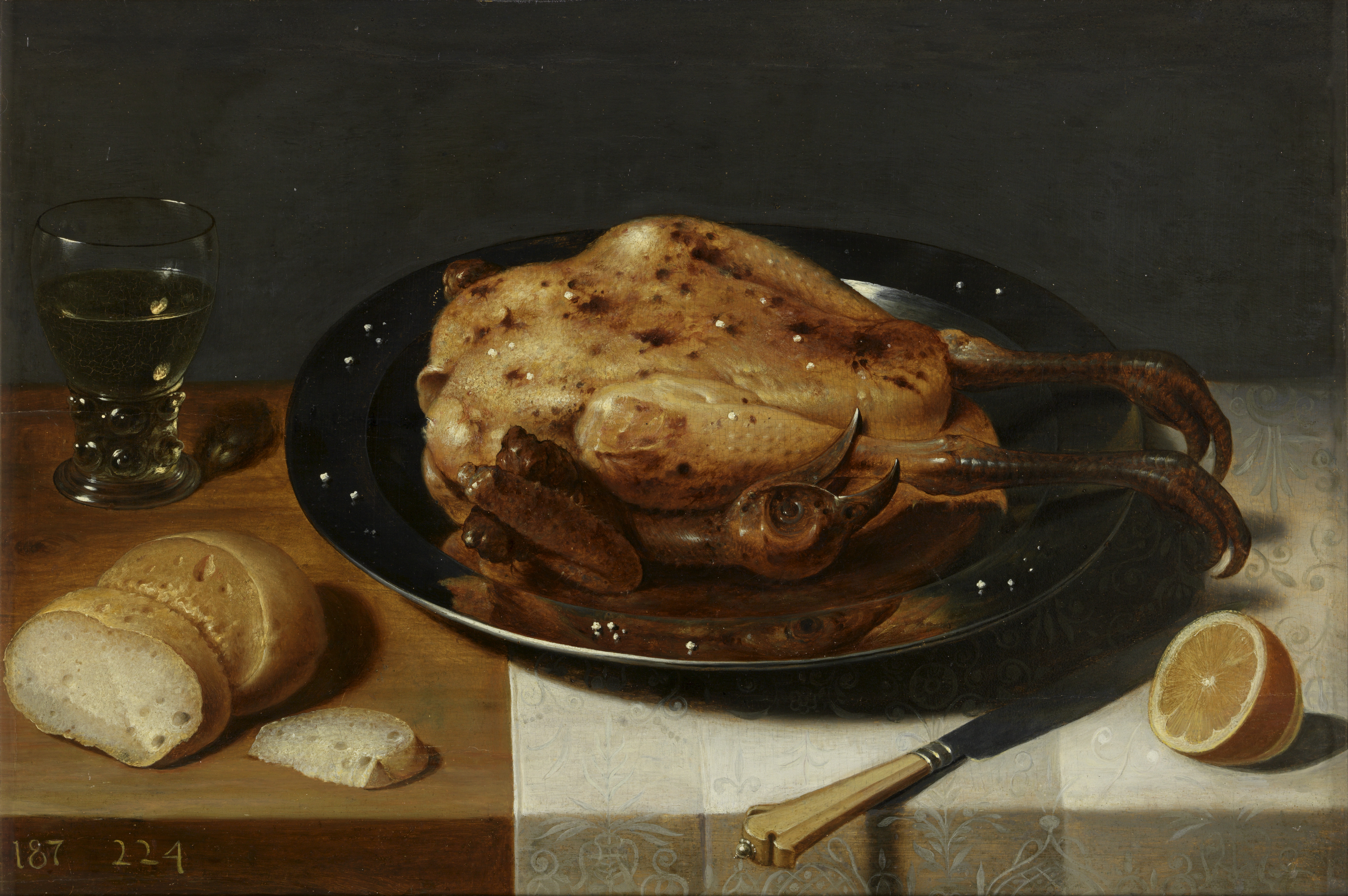
David Rijckaert II, Still life with a lemon and capon

The origins of caponized chickens are contested. They were known in ancient China as well as in ancient Greece and ancient Rome.

An early record of caponization is found under the Roman Republic: the Lex Fannia of 162 BC forbade fattening hens to conserve grain rations, so the Romans instead castrated roosters, which resulted in a doubling of size. It was also practiced later throughout medieval times, with gastronomic texts describing capons as preferred poultry since the ordinary fowl of the farmyard was regarded as peasant fare and "popular malice crediting monks with a weakness for capons."

In the early 20th century, France was internationally renowned for maintaining a strong caponization tradition with widespread and established industries throughout the country.

William Shakespeare mentioned capon in the famous "All the world's a stage" monologue from his play As You Like It (written c.1600). He similarly describes capon as a food of the wealthy. The monologue describes human life as consisting of seven stages, and the fifth stage is a middle-aged man who has reached the point where he has acquired wisdom and wealth. The monologue describes the fifth stage as: "The Justice, In fair round belly, with a good capon lin'd". In addition his character Sir John Falstaff is described as or implied to be fond of capons.

== Effects of caponization ==
An example of chicken castration in Southeast Asia. The caponization is usually performed by veterinary personnel and should follow some general guidelines.

Caponization is the process of turning a cockerel into a capon. Caponization can be done by surgically removing the bird's testes, or may also be accomplished through the use of estrogen implants. With either method, the male sex hormones normally present are no longer effective. Caponization must be done before the rooster matures so that it develops without the influence of male sex hormones.

Capons are not as aggressive as normal roosters. This makes capons easier to handle and allows capons to be kept together with other capons since their reduced aggression prevents them from fighting.

The lack of sex hormones results in meat that is less gamey in taste. Capon meat is also more moist, tender and flavorful than that of a cockerel or a hen, which is due not only to the hormonal differences during the capon's development but also because capons are not as active as roosters, which makes their meat more tender and fatty.

Capons develop a smaller head, comb and wattle than those of a normal rooster.

Capons are fairly rare in industrial meat production. Chickens raised for meat are bred and raised so that they mature very quickly. Industrial chickens can be sent to market in as little as five weeks. Cockerels produced under these conditions will taste very similar to conventional chicken meat, making caponization unnecessary.

== Specialised production ==
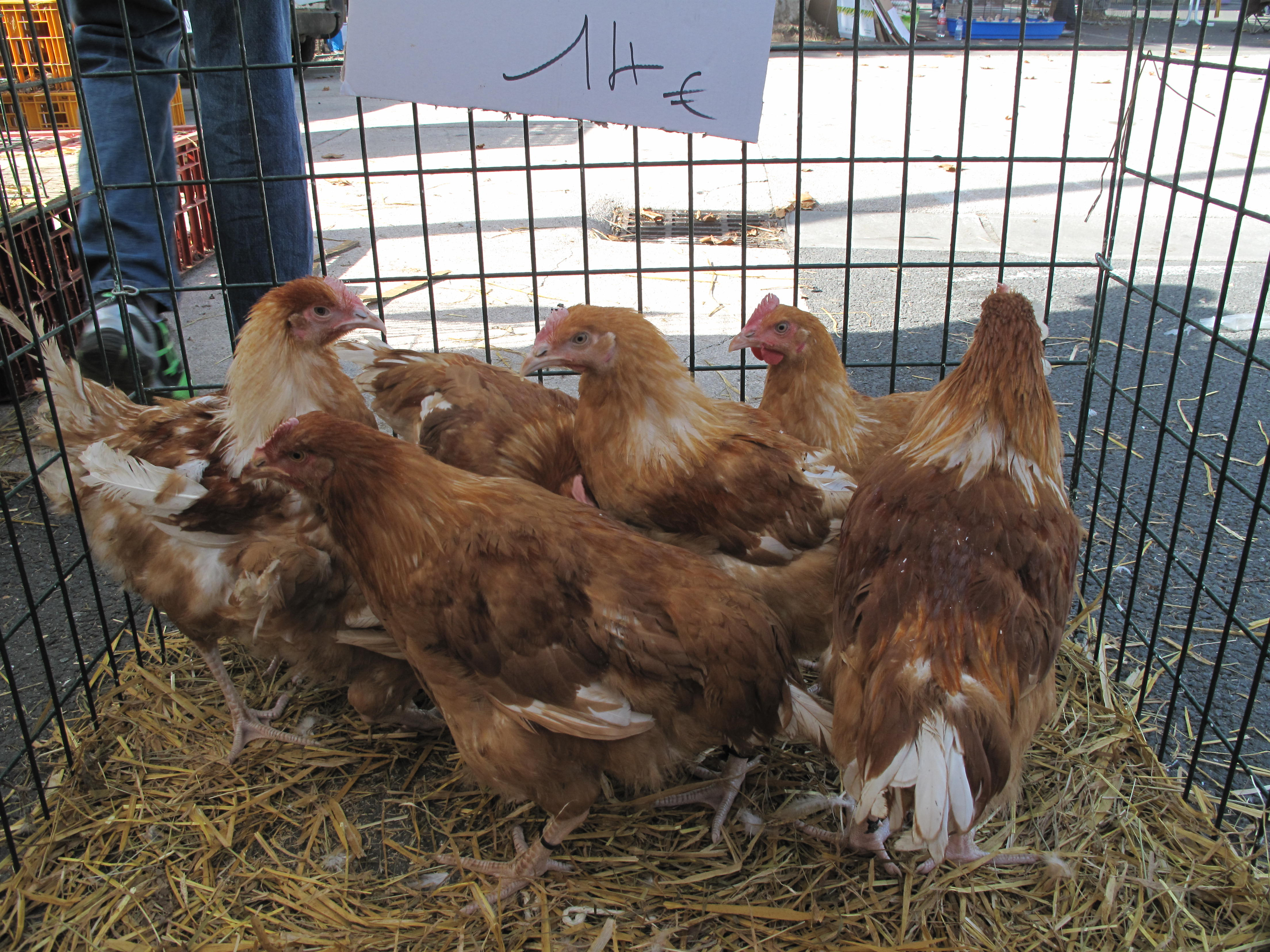
Capons in a French market

Capons are produced in France, in several provinces, notably the Gers and Jura regions. They are a speciality of Bresse (Chapon de Bresse), where they have their own appellation to differentiate them from capons from other regions. In Bresse, they are exclusively produced from the Bresse blue foot breed (patte bleue), and fed a certain diet which makes it even more tender than from other regions and breeds, making it a desirable meat.

Capons are also produced in many regions of northern Italy, such as Piedmont, Friuli-Venezia Giulia, Emilia-Romagna, and Marche. In the early 20th century, capon was commonly eaten for the main family feast on Christmas in Tuscany and northern Italian regions, which was a rare treat for peasant or working class families.

In the gastronomy of Spain, capons are usually eaten during the Christmas season in the northern regions. Capons of Vilalba and Lugo are particularly famous and are sold all over the country.

In China, capons are often raised specifically for consumption during Chinese New Year.

In Thailand, capons are also used for Hainanese Chicken Rice by established restaurants like Go Kok (in Lat Phrao), An An Lao (in Bangkok's Soi Ari / Sukhumvit 26), and the Bangkok branches of Boon Tong Kee, among many other fine Cantonese/Thai-Chinese restaurants.

== Legal status ==
In the UK physical caponization was made illegal in 1982 via the Welfare of Livestock (Prohibited Operations) Regulations 1982. These regulations were revoked and reinforced in 2007 as the Mutilations (Permitted Procedures) (England) Regulations 2007 which made castration of all domesticated birds illegal. However, it is not illegal to import castrated animals, so capons are therefore available for sale in the UK.

== Gallery ==
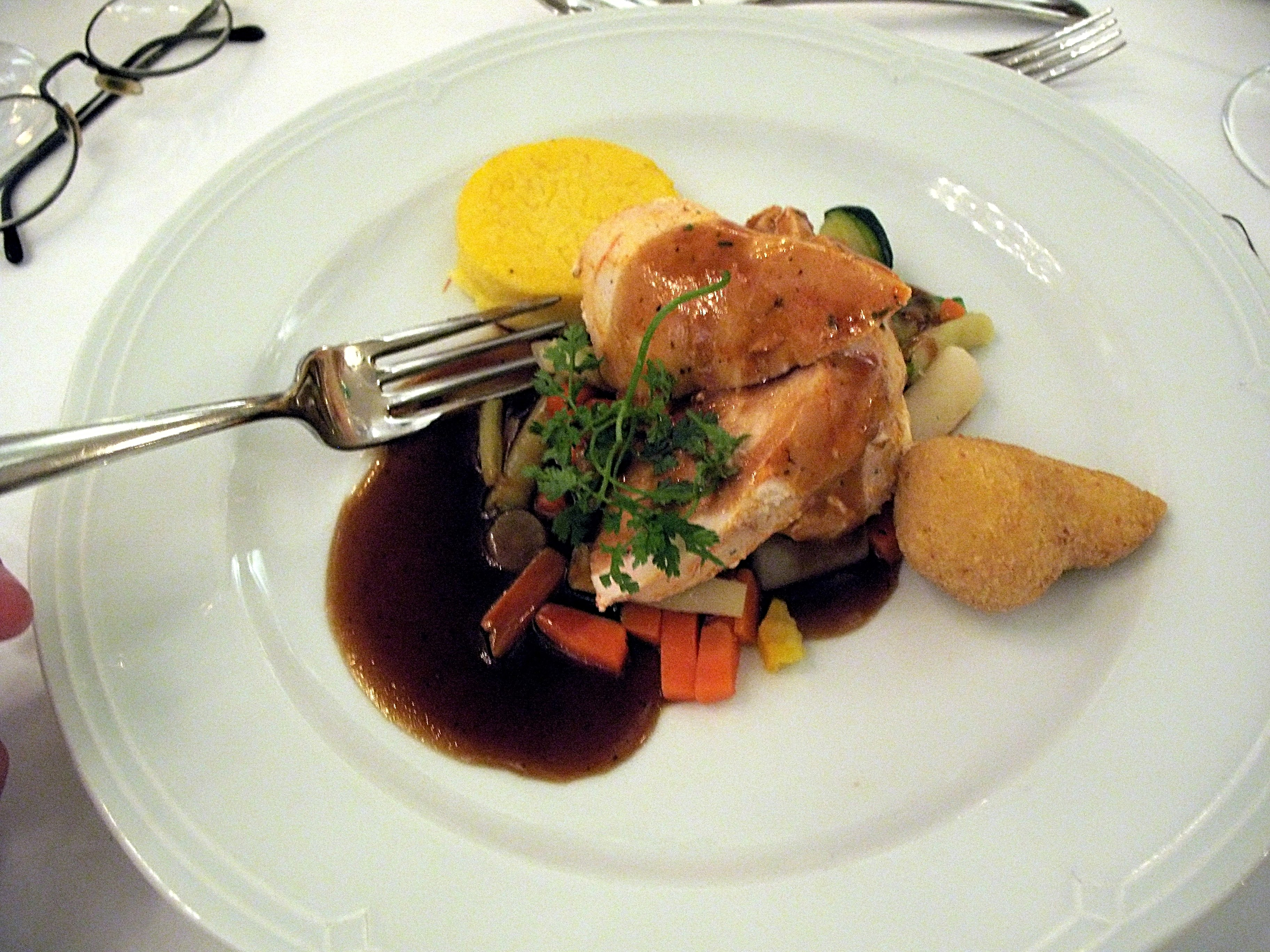

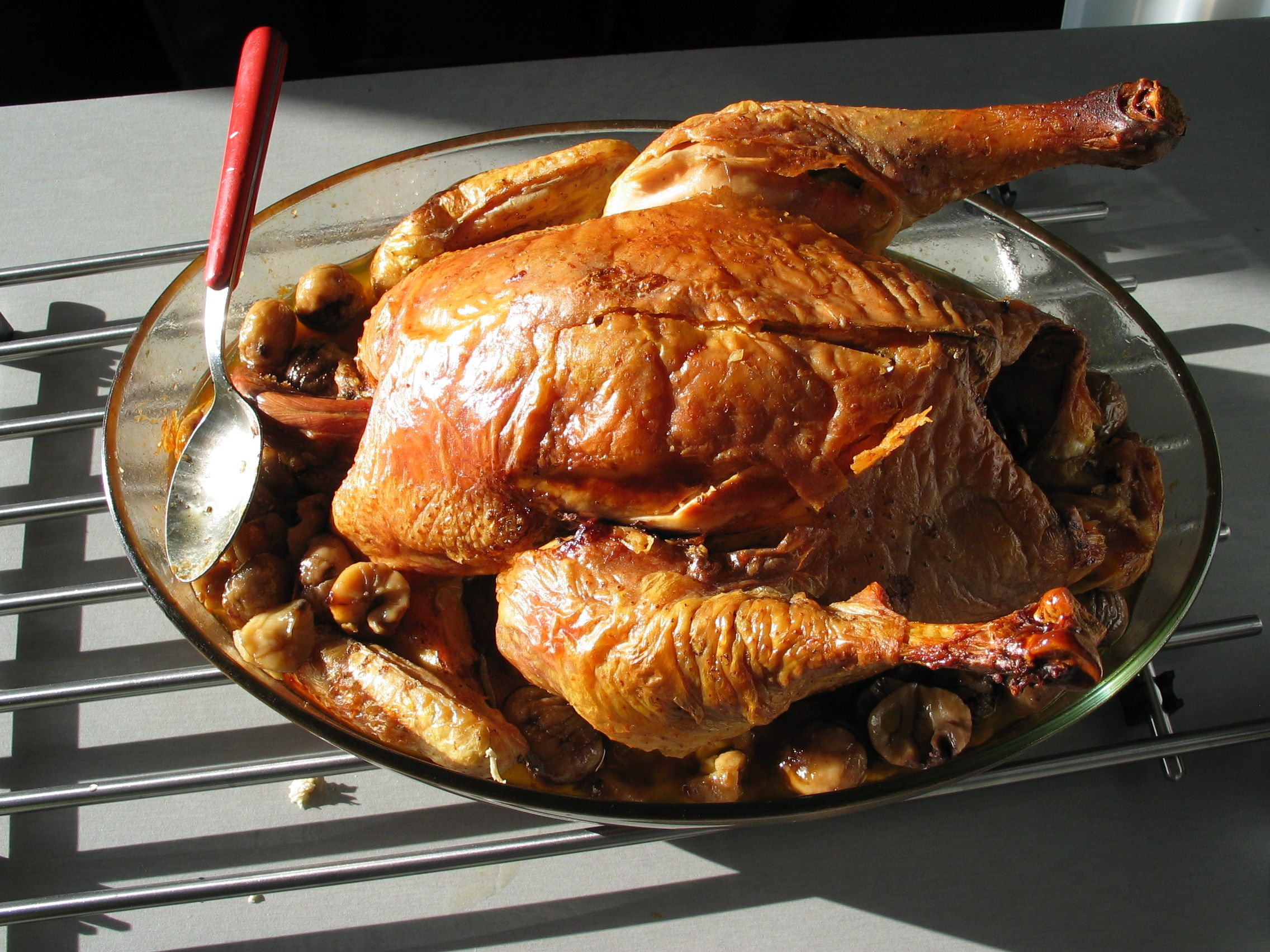

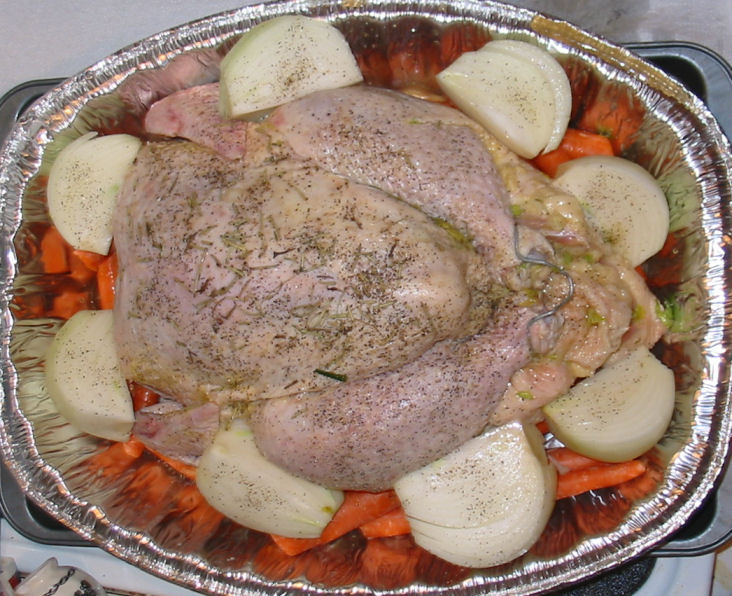

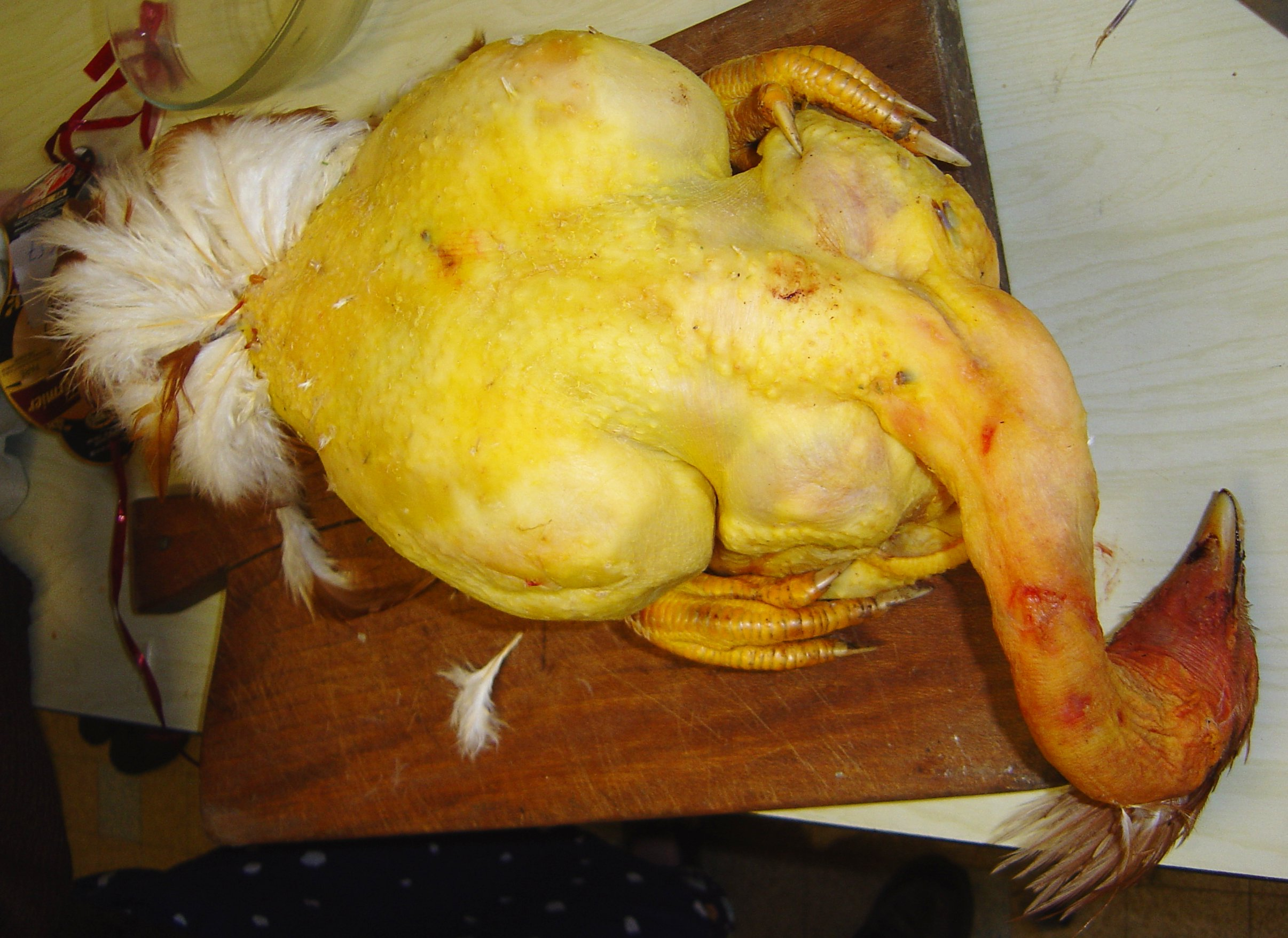

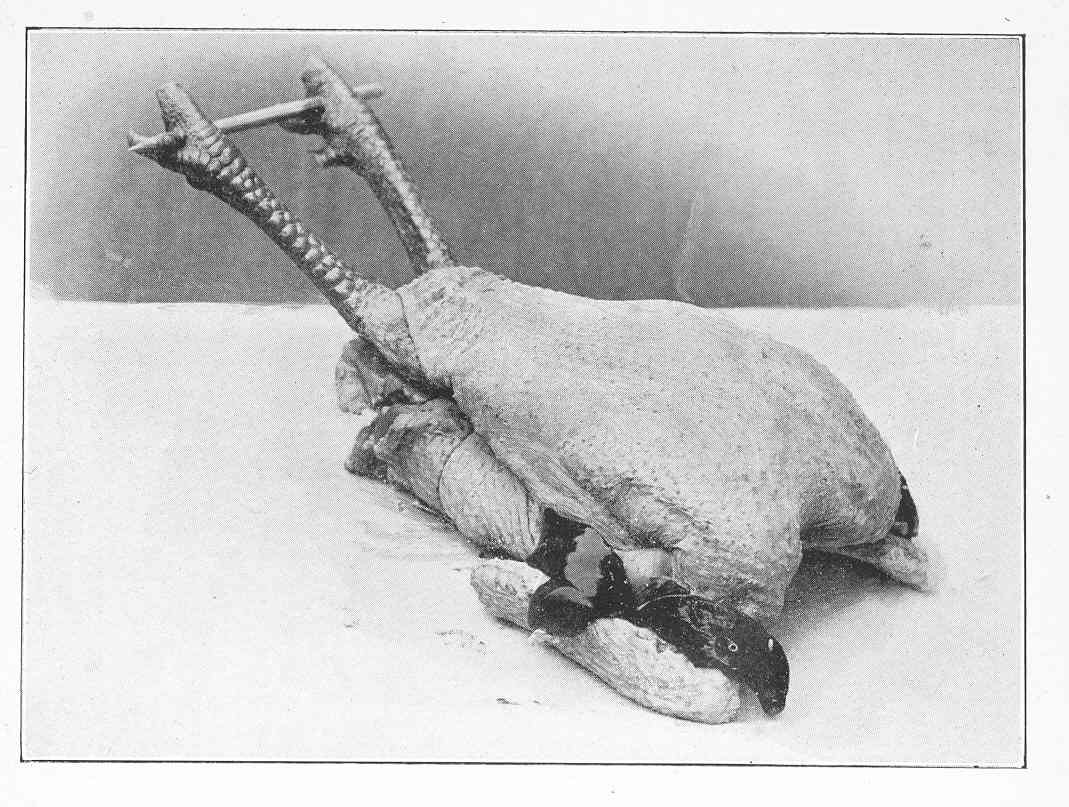

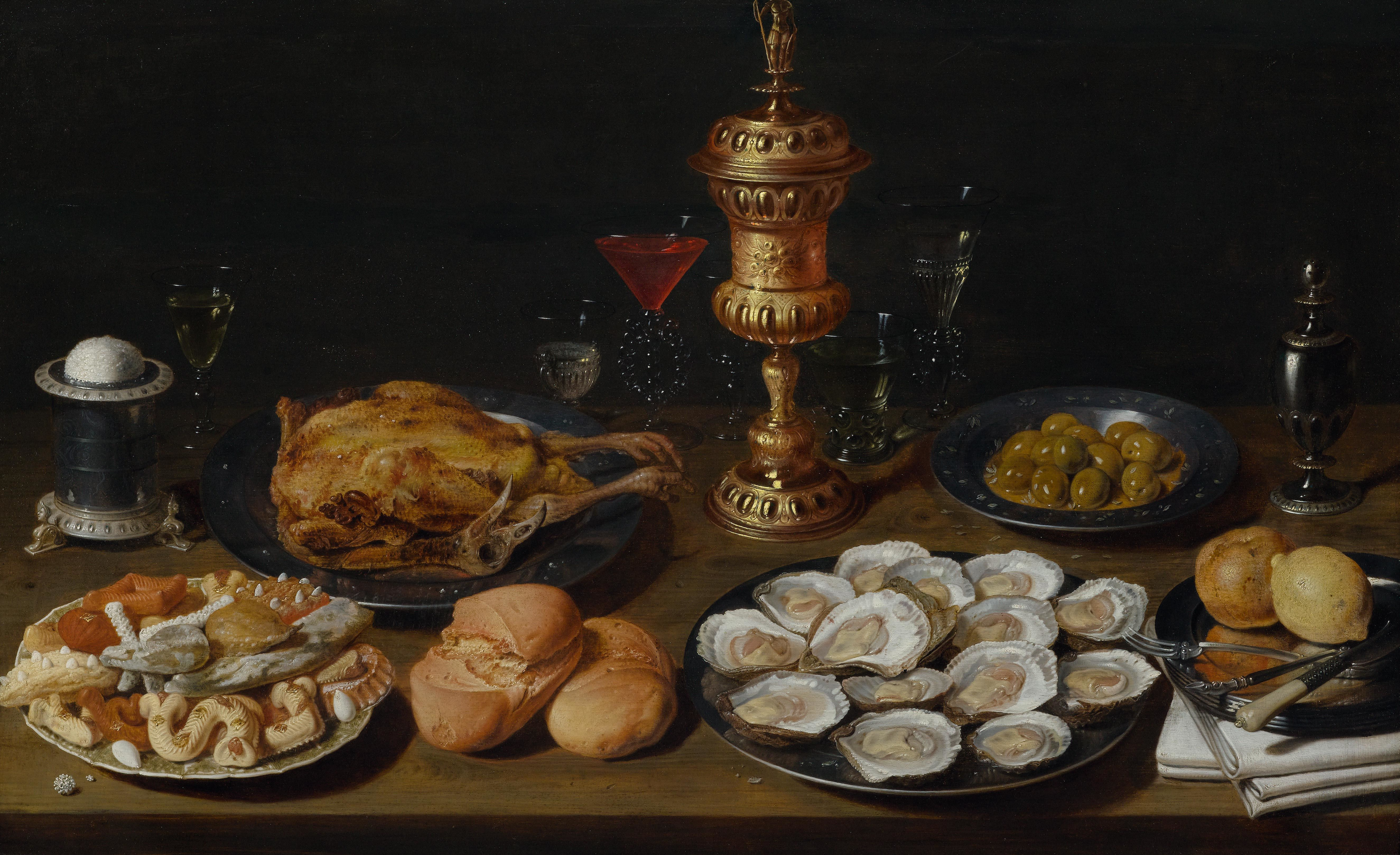

== See also ==
- Poularde
