= Bresse chicken =

French chicken product

Poulet de Bresse
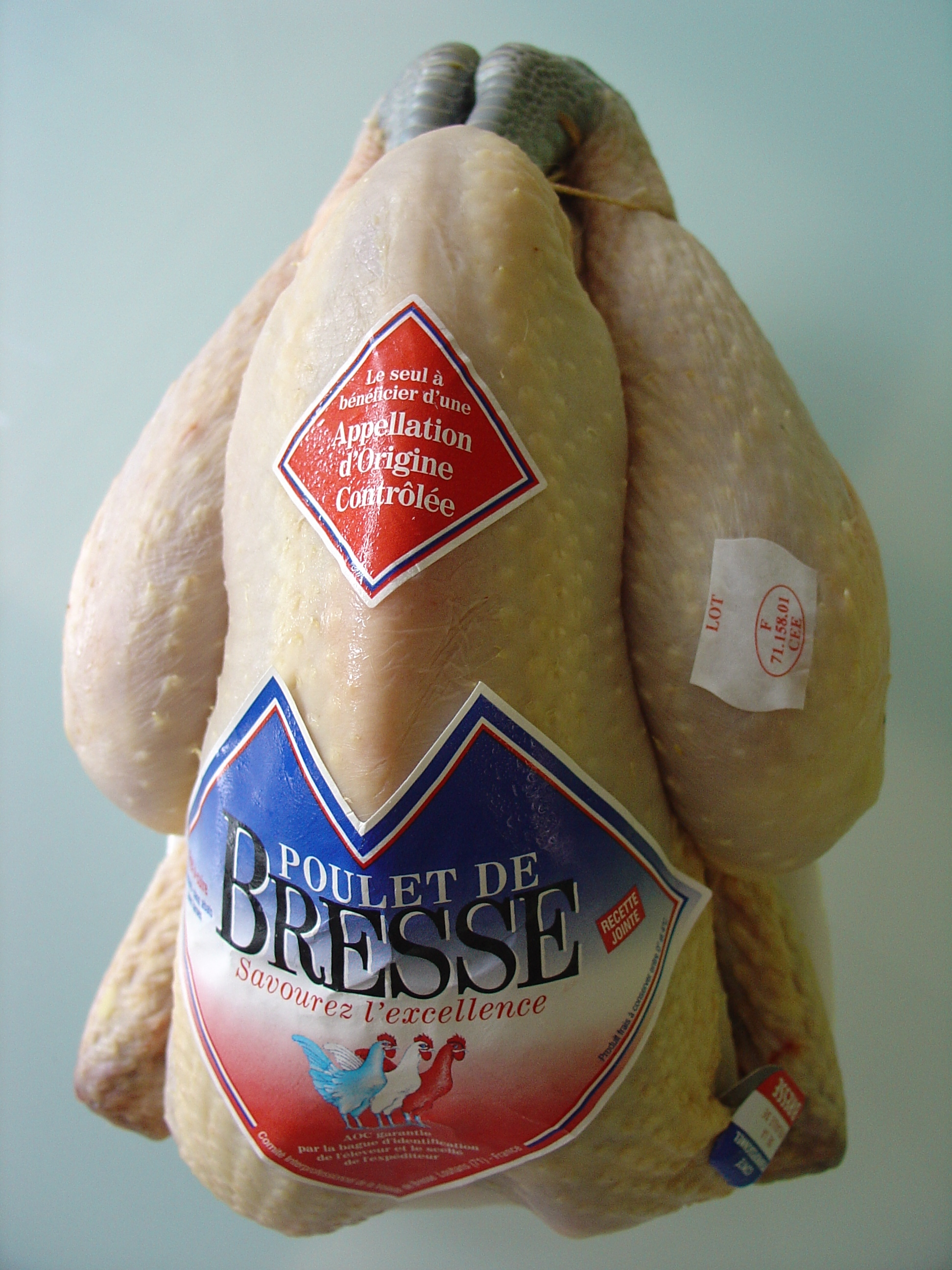
- A labelled poulet de Bresse
- Type: pullet, chicken or capon
- Place of origin: France
- Region or state: Bresse
- Other information: France: appellation d'origine contrôlée; European Union: appellation d'origine protégée

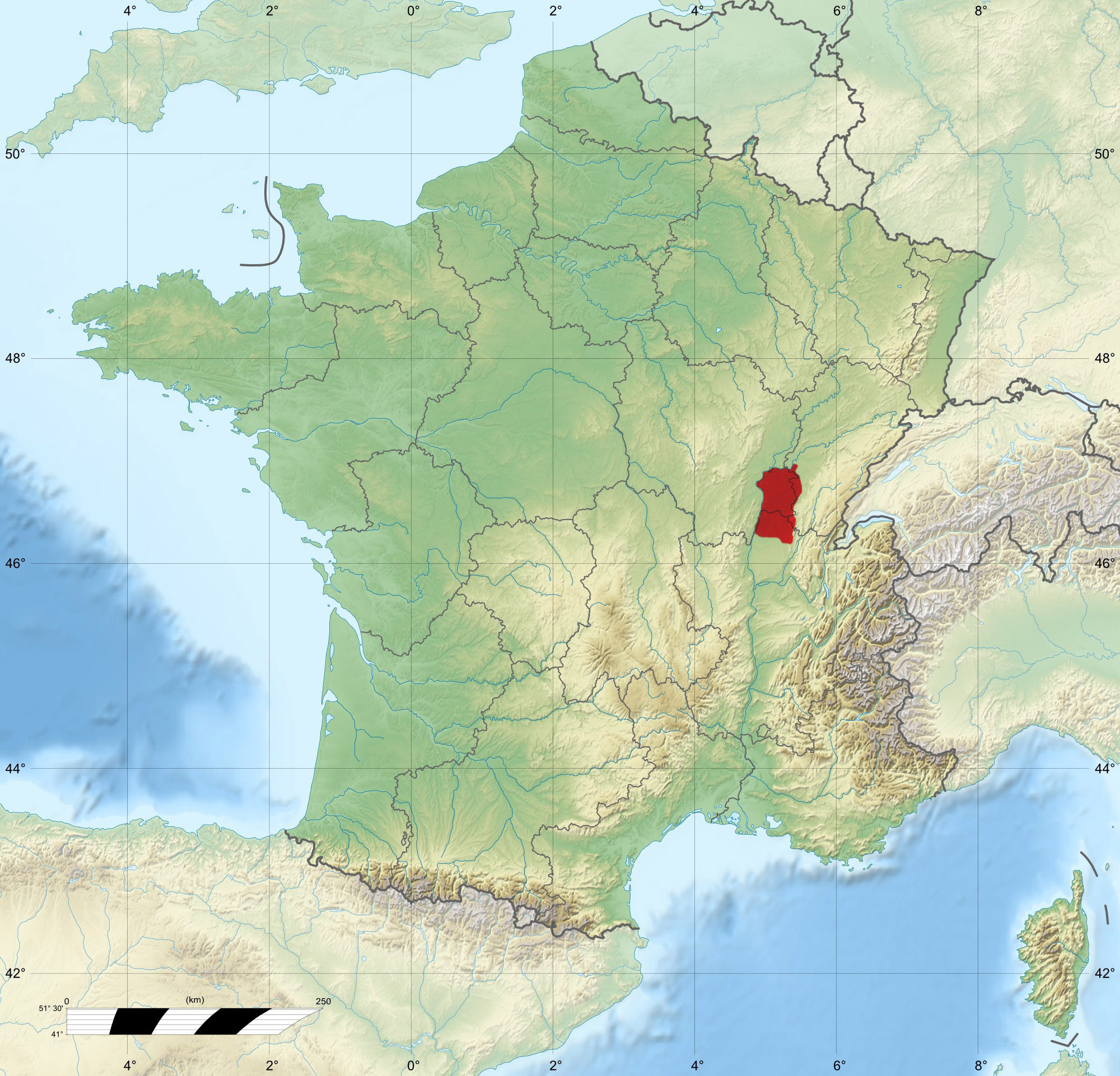
The approximate area of production of the poulet de Bresse (in red)

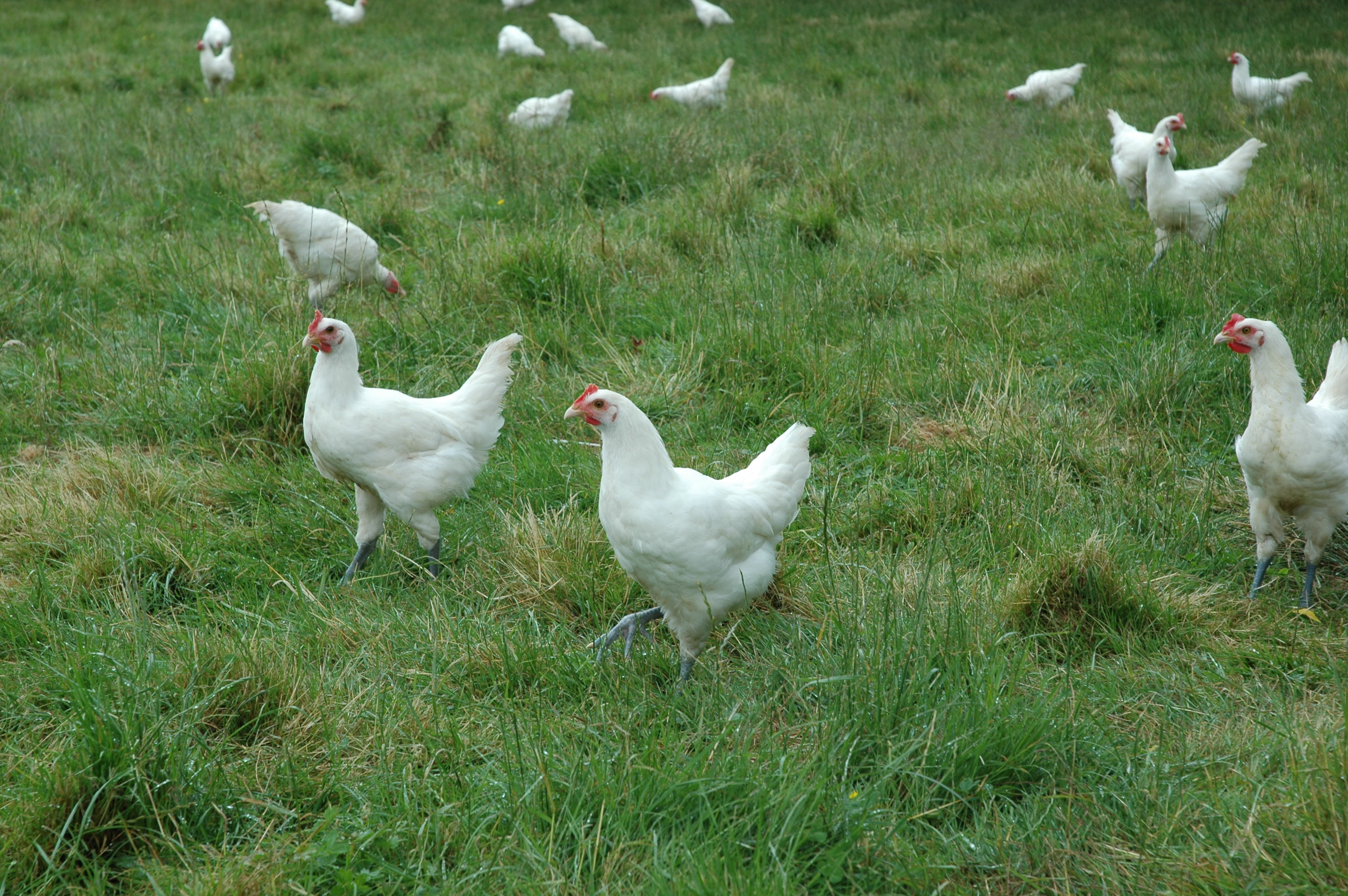
White Bresse de Bény chickens

The poulet de Bresse (Note: French pronunciation: [pu.lɛ d(ə) bʁɛs]) or volaille de Bresse is a French chicken product which has both appellation d'origine contrôlée and European Union protected designation of origin status, as Volaille de Bresse / Poulet de Bresse / Poularde de Bresse / Chapon de Bresse. It may be produced only from white chickens of the Bresse Gauloise breed raised within a legally-defined area of the historic region and former province of Bresse, in eastern France.

== History ==
The chickens of the Bresse region have long enjoyed a high reputation. The lawyer, politician, epicure and gastronome Jean Anthelme Brillat-Savarin (1755–1826), who was born at Belley in the Ain, is supposed to have described the Bresse chicken as "the queen of poultry, the poultry of kings". The name Volaille de Bresse – used both for chicken products and for the dinde de Bresse, the turkey of the area – received legal protection on 22 December 1936; this became an appellation d'origine contrôlée (AOC) in 1957. In the twenty-first century the poulet de Bresse has the reputation of being among the best-quality table chickens in the world. The chef Georges Blanc – who is from Bourg-en-Bresse – has been president of the Comité Interprofessionnel de la Volaille de Bresse, the association which oversees the product, since 1986. Alan Davidson has described the poulet de Bresse as the "aristocrat of modern table poultry", and Heston Blumenthal selected it for one of the dishes in his book In Search of Perfection.

== Production ==
Poulet de Bresse may be produced only from white chickens (the Bresse de Bény variety) of the Bresse Gauloise breed, raised within a legally-defined area of the historic region and former province of Bresse, in eastern France. The area is roughly rectangular, approximately 100 by 40 km, and includes parts of the departments of Ain, Jura and Saône-et-Loire, in the regions of Rhône-Alpes, Franche-Comté and Bourgogne respectively. It lies mainly between the towns of Mâcon, Chalon-sur-Saône, Dole and Lons-le-Saunier; Bourg-en-Bresse is within the area. Lyon is not far to the south, and Dijon not far to the north.

Approximately 1.2 million poulet de Bresse birds are produced each year, about 0.1% of the total annual production of chickens in France; about 10% are exported. The chickens are raised under strict controls. There are about 200 breeders; each must have a minimum of 0.5 ha of pasture in the area of production, and allow a minimum of 10 m^{2} per bird. Each bird must pass inspection by the Centre de Sélection de la Volaille de Bresse, the only breeding centre for the Bresse chicken.

The birds are kept free range for at least four months. From about 35 days they are fed cereals and dairy products; the diet is intentionally kept low in protein so that the birds forage for insects. They are then "finished" in an épinette, a cage in a darkened fattening shed, where they are intensively fed on maize and milk. Poulets ('pullets') are fattened for two weeks, and slaughtered at a minimum age of four months and a minimum weight of 1.2 kg; poulardes or large hens are fattened for four weeks and slaughtered at five months, when they weigh at least 1.8 kg; chapons or capons are also fattened for four weeks, and are slaughtered at eight months or more, at a minimum weight of 3 kg.

The birds are marketed with the head and characteristic slate-blue legs, traditionally a sign of authenticity. The left leg carries a metal leg-ring with the name of the producer.

Poulet de Bresse commands premium prices. In 2002 producers received an average of €4.00 per kg (whole chicken, ready to cook); comparable prices received by producers of organic and standard chickens were €2.70 and €1.60 respectively. Retail prices are much higher; a price of £19.50 per kg was reported from London in 2011.
