= Burtons Grill & Bar =

American restaurant chain

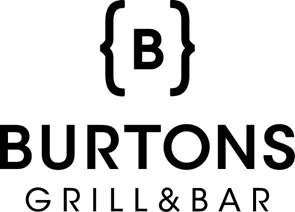

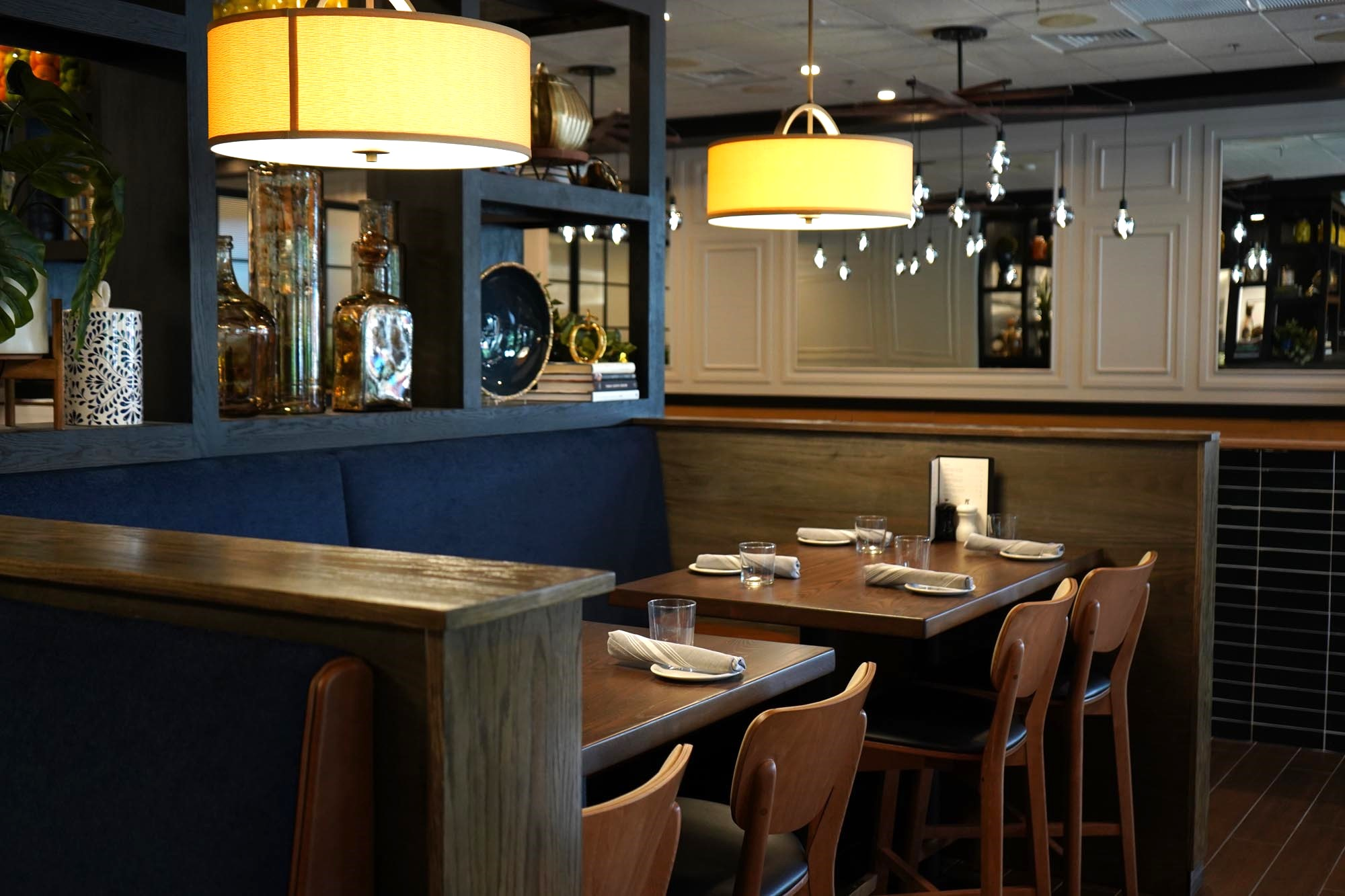
- The Burtons Grill & Bar in Richmond, Virginia.
- Type: Private
- Industry: Restaurant
- Founded: March 2005; 21 years ago
- Founder: Kevin Harron
- Headquarters: Andover, Massachusetts, United States
- Number of locations: 24 (2025)
- Area served: East Coast of the United States
- Key people: John Haggai (CEO)
- Parent: Burtons Grill, LLC
- Website: burtonsgrill.com

Burtons Grill & Bar is an American casual dining restaurant chain headquartered in Andover, Massachusetts, specializing in contemporary American cuisine prepared in a scratch kitchen. As of April 2026, the chain operates 25 restaurants across ten states along the East Coast of the United States. The company offers a variety of menu items, including burgers, steaks, seafood, pasta, salads, and desserts, with procedures to accommodate dietary restrictions, such as a separate gluten-free menu and allergy-friendly options.

== History ==
Burtons Grill & Bar was founded in March 2005 by Kevin Harron in Hingham, Massachusetts, aiming to provide an upscale dining experience in suburban areas. The chain expanded steadily along the East Coast over the subsequent years.

John Haggai joined the company in 2020 as President and Chief Operating Officer and succeeded founder Kevin Harron as CEO in 2022.

=== 2005–2010 ===
The first Burtons Grill & Bar opened in Hingham, Massachusetts, in 2005, focusing on upscale-casual dining in suburban markets. Early expansion targeted the Northeast, establishing a presence in Massachusetts and neighboring states.

=== 2011–2020 ===
In 2016, the chain opened a location in Alexandria, Virginia, on February 29, marking its entry into the Mid-Atlantic region. By 2020, Burtons Grill & Bar operated 16 locations, alongside five Red Heat Tavern locations, a sister brand offering a more casual dining experience.

=== 2021–present ===
Since 2021, Burtons Grill & Bar has experienced a period of growth, opening new locations in Lynnfield, Massachusetts (November 16, 2021), Gaithersburg, Maryland (June 27, 2022), Richmond, Virginia (June 20, 2023), Plantation, Florida (May 21, 2024), Atlanta, Georgia (November 7, 2024), Huntersville, North Carolina (April 22, 2025), Wayne, Pennsylvania (June 18, 2025), Mansfield, Massachusetts (November 18, 2025), and Bel Air, Maryland (April 21, 2026).In March 2025, the chain celebrated its 20th anniversary.

== Operations ==
As of April 2026, Burtons Grill & Bar operates 25 restaurants across ten states, primarily along the East Coast. The chain's scratch kitchen approach emphasizes freshly prepared dishes that can be tailored to diverse dietary needs.

Burtons Grill & Bar Locations (November 2025)
State	Location
Connecticut	South Windsor, Evergreen Walk
Florida	Boca Raton, Park Place
Florida	Plantation, Market on University
Georgia	Atlanta, Buckhead Landing
Maryland	Gaithersburg, Kentlands Market Square
Maryland	Riverdale Park, The Station
Maryland	Bel Air, Tollgate Marketplace
Massachusetts	Burlington, Middlesex Commons
Massachusetts	Framingham, Route 9 East
Massachusetts	Hingham, Derby Street Shops
Massachusetts	Lynnfield, MarketStreet
Massachusetts	Mansfield, Mansfield Crossing
Massachusetts	North Andover, Eaglewood Shops
Massachusetts	Shrewsbury, Lakeway Commons
Massachusetts	Westford, Cornerstone Square
New Hampshire	Nashua, Pheasant Lane Mall
North Carolina	Charlotte, Blakeney Town Center
North Carolina	Charlotte, Park Road Shopping Center
North Carolina	Huntersville, Birkdale Place
Pennsylvania	Wayne
South Carolina	Mount Pleasant, Mt. Pleasant Towne Centre
Virginia	Alexandria, Hilltop Village Center
Virginia	Charlottesville, The Shops at Stonefield
Virginia	Richmond, Carytown Exchange
Virginia	Sterling, Cascades Overlook Town Center

=== Red Heat Tavern ===
Red Heat Tavern, a sister brand under Burtons Grill, LLC, operates five locations in Massachusetts and Connecticut as of 2025, offering a casual, tavern-style dining experience.

== Menu ==
Burtons Grill & Bar offers a scratch kitchen menu featuring burgers, steaks, seafood, pasta, salads, and desserts, with brunch available at all locations and happy hour at select locations. Notable dishes include the Crab-Crusted Haddock, Maxx Burger, Superfood Salad, and Mediterranean Chicken Risotto. The chain provides a separate gluten-free menu, as well as a kids' menu, using separate equipment and protocols to prevent cross-contamination for guests with food allergies and dietary restrictions. The chain also offers private dining and catering menus. Ingredients are sourced from suppliers such as Allen Brothers for premium Angus beef and Ocean Spray for cranberries.

== Community Engagement ==
Burtons Grill & Bar prioritizes community engagement through partnerships with local schools, non-profit organizations, sports teams, and breweries. The restaurant group positions itself as a "neighborhood staple" in communities like Buckhead, Atlanta, and Burlington, Massachusetts. Since 2024, Burtons has run an annual fundraising campaign for the Celiac Program at Boston Children's Hospital, with its second campaign in 2025 raising funds to support pediatric celiac disease research. The chain received multiple awards for its gluten-free and allergy-friendly accommodations, including recognition from Northshore Magazine's Readers' Choice Awards in 2020, and Bethesda Magazine's Best of Bethesda: Allergy-Friendly Brunch in 2024. Burtons was also featured on CBS Boston for its gluten-free dining practices in 2024.
