= List of Chopped episodes (season 41–present) =

This is the list of episodes for the Food Network competition reality series Chopped, beginning with season 41. New episodes are broadcast on Tuesdays at 8 p.m. ET.

== Series overview ==
Season	Episodes	Originally released	
Season	Episodes	First released	Last released
1	13	January 13, 2009	April 7, 2009
2	13	June 16, 2009	September 29, 2009
3	13	October 13, 2009	March 9, 2010
4	13	April 6, 2010	July 13, 2010
5	13	July 20, 2010	November 28, 2010
6	12	January 4, 2011	April 26, 2011
7	10	May 3, 2011	July 5, 2011
8	9	July 12, 2011	December 6, 2011
9	13	August 30, 2011	December 13, 2011
10	13	December 20, 2011	May 29, 2012
11	13	February 7, 2012	November 25, 2012
12	13	June 5, 2012	November 20, 2012
13	12	September 4, 2012	February 26, 2013
14	13	January 6, 2013	May 5, 2013
15	13	April 2, 2013	July 23, 2013
16	13	June 2, 2013	November 12, 2013
17	13	August 13, 2013	December 3, 2013
18	13	November 26, 2013	May 13, 2014
19	13	February 4, 2014	June 10, 2014
20	13	March 18, 2014	November 25, 2014
21	13	July 15, 2014	January 13, 2015
22	13	October 14, 2014	June 30, 2015
23	13	December 16, 2014	June 16, 2015
24	13	April 28, 2015	December 8, 2015
25	13	August 25, 2015	December 1, 2015
26	8	October 6, 2015	December 17, 2015
27	13	January 5, 2016	March 17, 2016
28	13	March 29, 2016	June 21, 2016
29	13	August 7, 2016	September 27, 2016
30	8	September 22, 2016	December 20, 2016
31	20	October 13, 2016	December 29, 2016
32	12	January 3, 2017	May 2, 2017
33	8	March 21, 2017	May 30, 2017
34	13	May 9, 2017	November 7, 2017
35	20	July 18, 2017	March 6, 2018
36	13	December 12, 2017	June 5, 2018
37	13	March 13, 2018	June 11, 2019
38	13	May 15, 2018	May 28, 2019
39	13	June 26, 2018	May 14, 2019
40	13	July 17, 2018	July 16, 2019
41	13	December 11, 2018	March 31, 2020
42	8	November 20, 2018	June 2, 2020
43	13	July 9, 2019	February 25, 2020
44	13	September 24, 2019	August 4, 2020
45	13	January 21, 2020	July 28, 2020
46	13	July 14, 2020	October 27, 2020
47	13	April 7, 2020	May 25, 2021
48	13	December 15, 2020	March 30, 2021
49	13	November 10, 2020	May 18, 2021
50	18	June 1, 2021	March 22, 2022
51	13	December 28, 2021	April 5, 2022
52	13	April 12, 2022	October 25, 2022
53	13	October 18, 2022	August 8, 2023
54	13	December 27, 2022	March 28, 2023
55	19	April 4, 2023	December 12, 2023
56	13	August 22, 2023	January 30, 2024
57	13	February 6, 2024	August 13, 2024
58	13	April 2, 2024	June 25, 2024
59	13	August 20, 2024	May 6, 2025
60	13	October 15, 2024	July 22, 2025
61	13	January 7, 2025	July 8, 2025
62	13	July 29, 2025	May 5, 2026

== Episodes ==
=== Season 41 (2018–20) ===
No. overall	No. in season	Title	Judges	Original release date
510	1	"Ultimate Redemption"	Chris Santos, Maneet Chauhan, and Marc Murphy	December 11, 2018
Ingredients: Appetizer: goat chops, escarole, pickled eggs, beet hummus; Entrée: capon, pak choi, michelada mix, raisin bran; Dessert: mega cookie sandwich, Brazil nuts, Korean milk soda, wild strawberries in syrup; Contestants: Seis Kamimura, Executive Chef from Seattle, WA (Chopped: Beat Bobby Flay Tournament) (eliminated after the appetizer); Nick Wallace, Executive Chef from Jackson, MS (Alton's Challenge Tournament) (eliminated after the entrée); Lynnae Oxley-Loupe, Chef and Pitmaster from Portland, OR (Gold Medal Games Tournament) (eliminated after the dessert); Stephen Coe, Executive Chef from Plymouth, MA (Grill Masters 2017 Tournament) (winner); Notes: This episode featured runners-up from various multi-episode Chopped tournaments who did not win their final rounds.
511	2	"Game On!"	Scott Conant, Amanda Freitag, and Geoffrey Zakarian	January 29, 2019
Ingredients: Appetizer: Wagyu beef, norwis potatoes, pickled avocados, nacho cheesecake; Entrée: jalapeño jelly shots, red cabbage, chili dog bread, chicken drumsticks; Dessert: soft pretzel dough, kumquats, beer sangria, reuben egg rolls; Contestants: Jennifer Bajsel, Owner & Executive Chef from Dallas, TX (eliminated after the appetizer); Aaron Morrisey, Sous Chef from Edgewater, NJ (eliminated after the entrée); Stephen Hayek, Owner & Executive Chef from Highlands, NJ (eliminated after the dessert); John Bedingfield, Executive Chef from Baltimore, MD (winner); Notes: Each basket had typical sports/football fan food.
512	3	"Three Cheers for Chocolate!"	Martha Stewart, Alex Guarnaschelli, and Geoffrey Zakarian	February 5, 2019
Ingredients: Appetizer: dark chocolate ketchup, lychee, corn chips, dark chocolate blackout cake; Entrée: milk chocolate pot de crème, rainier cherries, duck livers, giant milk chocolate treat; Dessert: white chocolate truffle tower, apricots, aleppo pepper, white hot chocolate; Contestants: Michelle Poteaux, Pastry Chef & Owner from Alexandria, VA (eliminated after the appetizer); Julian Plyter, Pastry Chef & Owner from New York, NY (eliminated after the entrée); Dan Huynh, Executive Pastry Chef from Cupertino, CA (eliminated after the dessert); Melodie Asseraf, Pastry Chef & Owner from New York, NY (winner); Notes: This was a special all-desserts episode with pastry chefs. There was chocolate in every basket; the first round was dark chocolate, the second round was milk chocolate, and the third round was white chocolate. The first round was extended to 30 minutes.
513	4	"Bacon, Burgers and Beer!"	Angie Mar, Maneet Chauhan, and Marcus Samuelsson	May 21, 2019
Ingredients: Appetizer: pork belly, cheese curds, purple baby Brussels sprouts, bacon roses; Entrée: gourmet burger blend (short rib, brisket and flat iron steak), pickled watermelon rind, iceberg lettuce, french fry coated onion rings; Dessert: stout beer chocolate ice cream, nectarines, pub cookies, reaper chili beer; Contestants: Nicole Roarke, Chef Consultant from Long Island, NY (eliminated after the appetizer); Jonathan Shepard, Executive Chef from New York, NY (eliminated after the entrée); Diego Sanchez, Executive Chef from New York, NY (eliminated after the dessert); Brittany Rescigno, Head Chef from Sunnyvale, CA (winner); Notes: The theme of this episode was bacon in the appetizer round, burger ingredients with a requirement to make burgers in the entree round, and beer in the dessert round.
514	5	"Just Add Cheese!"	Alex Guarnaschelli, Marcus Samuelsson, and Liz Thorpe	June 4, 2019
Ingredients: Appetizer: Philly cheesesteak bowl, lemon soda, Italian sausage, herbed goat cheese; Entrée: deep dish pizza, Canadian bacon, queen weaver ants, Pico Melero; Dessert: mac & cheese grilled cheese, honeycrisp apples, salted caramel, Alpine cheese; Contestants: Zack Davis-Wooldridge, Executive Chef from San Francisco, CA (eliminated after the appetizer); Laura Meyer, Head Pizzaiolo from Sacramento, CA (eliminated after the entrée); Rahaf Amer, Executive Chef from Nashville, TN (eliminated after the dessert); Lanfranco Paliotti, Head Chef from Brooklyn, NY (winner); Notes: This was a cheese themed episode with cheese in every basket. The lemon soda in the first round was an Italian-style "limonata". The ants in the second round were dried and flavored with basil.
515	6	"Holy Bologna!"	Geoffrey Zakarian, Amanda Freitag, and Maneet Chauhan	June 18, 2019
Ingredients: Appetizer: bologna cake, tomato soup, celtuce, Cerignola olives; Entrée: beef kidneys, stroopwafels, ramps, snow fungus soup; Dessert: kransekake, key limes, green almonds, rose syrup; Contestants: Kat Britt, Lead Line Cook from Nashville, TN (eliminated after the appetizer); Doug Rodrigues, Chef from Boston, MA (eliminated after the entrée); Roseanne "Roe" DiLeo, Chef & Food Director from Dallas, TX (eliminated after the dessert); Jay Rohlfing, Executive Chef from Towson, MD (winner)
516	7	"Plum Fantastic"	Scott Conant, Geoffrey Zakarian, and Marcus Samuelsson	June 25, 2019
Ingredients: Appetizer: kinome, raspberry wasabi mustard, buffalo potato tots, chicken hearts; Entrée: guinea hen, mixed oca, nopales, 'O pere e 'o musso; Dessert: micro lemongrass, strawberry cream liqueur, sour plums, Dutch baby pancakes; Contestants: Cara Nance, Executive Chef from Barrington, RI (eliminated after the appetizer); Marlee Belmonte, Sous Chef from San Francisco, CA (eliminated after the entrée); Sam Badolato, Estate Winery Chef from Sonoma, CA (eliminated after the dessert); Leo Asaro, Executive Chef from Boston, MA (winner); Notes: In the second round, "'O pere e 'o musso" is described by the judges as a Naples street food made of boiled pig snout and pig foot.
517	8	"Culinary Fireworks"	Scott Conant, Geoffrey Zakarian, and Marcus Samuelsson	July 2, 2019
Ingredients: Appetizer: watermelon tequila keg, seafood corn dogs, patriotic deviled eggs, corn on the cob; Entrée: cowboy steaks, firecracker mizuna, antipasti kebabs, star spangled spaghetti; Dessert: mustard & ketchup cake, raspberries, graham crackers, candy-coated chocolates; Contestants: Ross Scofield, Chef & Owner from Philadelphia, PA (eliminated after the appetizer); Kalen Jane, Restaurant Consultant & Chef from Fort Worth, TX (eliminated after the entrée); Ed Evans, Executive Chef from Hanover, MD (eliminated after the dessert); Ben Merritt, Chef & Owner from Fort Worth, TX (winner); Notes: The baskets in this episode celebrated American summertime food. The patriotic eggs in Round 1, the star spangled spaghetti in Round 2, and the candy chocolates in Round 3 were dyed red, white, and blue.
518	9	"Take the Cake"	Geoffrey Zakarian, Alex Guarnaschelli, and Marcus Samuelsson	July 23, 2019
Ingredients: Appetizer: scallops, galangal, marsh snail vinegar, croissant tacos; Entrée: soft shell crabs, culantro, turkey eggs, baby bananas; Dessert: Swedish princess cake, green strawberries, lavender mints, Basmati rice; Contestants: Josh Cohen, Sous Chef from New York, NY (eliminated after the appetizer); Mona Michael, Chef & Owner from San Francisco, CA (eliminated after the entrée); Juan Rodriguez, Chef & Owner from Fort Worth, TX (eliminated after the dessert); Rashad Armstead, Chef & Owner from Oakland, CA (winner)
519	10	"So Sumac Me!"	Marcus Samuelsson, Alex Guarnaschelli, and Chris Santos	August 13, 2019
Ingredients: Appetizer: kibbeh nayeh, lemon meringue tart, Persian cucumbers, roti; Entrée: monkfish tails, asparagus, sumac, umeboshi; Dessert: dragon fruit, cured egg yolks, piloncillo, butter crackers; Contestants: Al McLean, Executive Chef from Natick, MA (eliminated after the appetizer); Yasi Sapp, Executive Chef from Philadelphia, PA (eliminated after the entrée); Kristina Preka, Culinary Director from New York, NY (eliminated after the dessert); Xavier Santiago, Executive Chef from Manchester, CT (winner)
520	11	"Tendon Loving Care"	Marcus Samuelsson, Maneet Chauhan, and Chris Santos	February 11, 2020
Ingredients: Appetizer: beef tendon, bok choy, fried persimmon, pea milk; Entrée: lomo Ibérico, Chinese okra, king oyster mushrooms, pinto beans & cheese; Dessert: apple tarte Tatin, mangos, preserved yogurt, graham crackers; Contestants: Tony Camilleri, Executive Chef from West Hartford, CT (eliminated after the appetizer); Desiree Simon, Private Chef & Caterer from New York, NY (eliminated after the entrée); Anoosh Shariat, Executive Chef and Owner from Louisville, KY (eliminated after the dessert); Eliza Martin, Chef & Culinary Instructor from San Francisco, CA (winner)
521	12	"Poutine Cuisine"	Chris Santos, Alex Guarnaschelli, and Marc Murphy	March 17, 2020
Ingredients: Appetizer: hot chicken poutine, Argentinian sausage, fava beans, sour bamboo slices; Entrée: red grouper, spring garlic, bubble tea, broccoli & cheese calzone; Dessert: Chinese bacon, rainbow pretzel, black mission figs, canned custard; Contestants: Neil Syham, Chef and Owner from Flushing, NY (eliminated after the appetizer); Rob Dasalla, Chef de Cuisine from San Jose, CA (eliminated after the entrée); Doreen DeMarco, Executive Chef from Philadelphia, PA (eliminated after the dessert); Aldo Alo, Private Chef from Southampton, NY (winner)
522	13	"Frying Times"	Geoffrey Zakarian, Maneet Chauhan, and Marc Murphy	March 31, 2020
Ingredients: Appetizer: tarragon soda, halibut fillets, zucchini, mushroom ravioli; Entrée: lamb shoulder, mozzarella sticks, green beans, cricket flour; Dessert: chocolate sandwich cookies, plantains, sweet pear mint, french fry sundae; Contestants: Fabiano Baiera, Chef from Harrison, NJ (eliminated after the appetizer); Hans Trabi, Sous Chef from New York, NY (eliminated after the entrée); Patrick Roney, Executive Chef from Louisville, KY (eliminated after the dessert); Sarah Nelson, Executive Chef from New York, NY (winner); Notes: The chefs had to fry at least one item in each round. To accommodate the theme, a second fryer was put into the Chopped kitchen.

=== Season 42 (2018–20) ===
No. overall	No. in season	Title	Judges	Original release date
523	1	"Thanksgiving Pie, Oh My!"	Martha Stewart, Amanda Freitag, and Marc Murphy	November 20, 2018
Ingredients: Appetizer: red malabar spinach, mashed potato & gravy ice cream, turkey giblets, apple butternut squash soup; Entrée: whole turkey, leeks, breakfast sausage, kouign-amann; Dessert: turkey skin, cranberries, tawny port, sweet potato spoonbread; Contestants: Meredith Lorencz, Sous Chef from Bethlehem, PA (eliminated after the appetizer); Gregg Brackman, Chef & Owner from Swampscott, MA (eliminated after the entrée); Lee Davidson, Caterer from Oakland, CA (eliminated after the dessert); David Thomas, Chef & Owner from Baltimore, MD (winner); Notes: This a Thanksgiving themed episode. The rounds were modified to fit the theme: the first round was "sides," the second round was "turkey," and the third round was "pie." This is the first episode where all three rounds were given extended time limits: the first round was 30 minutes to accommodate multiple side dishes, the second round was extended to 45 minutes to give enough time to butcher and cook the turkey, and the third round was 45 minutes to give enough time to bake a pie.
524	2	"Weird, Wacky, and Wild!"	Geoffrey Zakarian, Amanda Freitag, and Marcus Samuelsson	September 17, 2019
Ingredients: Appetizer: foot soup, buffalo milk pasta, bitter melon leaves, pork uterus; Entrée: fuzzy squash, liquid kimchi, dried shrimp, nutria; Dessert: banana milk, mangosteen, blood pancakes, unicorn barf; Contestants: CJ Barroso, Executive Chef from New York, NY (eliminated after the appetizer); Greg Stott, Chef de Cuisine from Ramsey, NJ (eliminated after the entrée); Alex Crabb, Chef and Owner from Boston, MA (eliminated after the dessert); Jen Biesty, Chef and Owner from Oakland, CA (winner); Notes: The theme of this episode was weird ingredients in every basket. The "unicorn barf" in round three was a colorful marshmallow treat.
525	3	"Sweet and Salty Success"	Chris Santos, Martha Stewart, and Maneet Chauhan	January 7, 2020
Ingredients: Appetizer: bastilla, shishito peppers, candied bacon, feta & watermelon salad; Entrée: rabbit saddle, kettle corn, mâche, everything bagel doughnuts; Dessert: strawberry pretzel gelatin, cape gooseberries, yogurt-covered almonds, white miso paste; Contestants: Nick Cassidy, Corporate Executive Chef from Philadelphia, PA (eliminated after the appetizer); Koji Kakimoto, Executive Chef from Huntington, NY (eliminated after the entrée); Robin Clark, Chef de Cuisine from Worcester, MA (eliminated after the dessert); Chris Kollar, Owner and Chocolatier from Yountville, CA (winner); Notes: In this episode, the chefs had to pair sweet and salty ingredients that were featured in each basket.
526	4	"Chopped U"	Scott Conant, Martha Stewart, and Amanda Freitag	January 14, 2020
Ingredients: Appetizer: frozen pizza, baby kale, salsa, ground beef; Entrée: lamb chops, baby carrots, bacon-wrapped avocado with egg, espresso drink; Dessert: cereal-infused milk, bananas, peanut butter, edible cookie dough; Contestants: Rachel Prokupek (Sophomore), University of Pennsylvania in Philadelphia, PA (eliminated after the appetizer); Leticia de Souza (Sophomore), Stanford University in Stanford, CA (eliminated after the entrée); Donny Enriquez (Junior), University of Wisconsin-Madison in Madison, WI (eliminated after the dessert); Benjamin Dubow (Senior), Columbia University in New York, NY (winner); Notes: College students compete in this episode.
527	5	"B.L.D: Breakfast, Lunch, and Dinner!"	Scott Conant, Chris Santos, and Maneet Chauhan	January 28, 2020
Ingredients: Appetizer: sausage links, heirloom tomatoes, grape jelly, pork roll ice cream; Entrée: salt-baked fish (whole bass), Meyer lemons, sandwich bread, (canned) beef ravioli; Dessert: rack of lamb, beet carpaccio, sea beans, frozen dinner (chicken-fried rice); Contestants: Rory Lee, Chef de Cuisine from Cambridge, MA (eliminated after the appetizer); Dawn Tyson, Executive Chef from Newark, NJ (eliminated after the entrée); Eustace Wehner, Executive Chef from Boston, MA (eliminated after the dessert); Samantha Gordon, Chef and Owner from San Francisco, CA (winner); Notes: In this special episode, the three rounds (appetizer, entrée, and dessert) were replaced by breakfast, lunch, and dinner.
528	6	"Smokin' Skills"	Marc Murphy, Alex Guarnaschelli, and Geoffrey Zakarian	February 4, 2020
Ingredients: Appetizer: sablefish, Chioggia beets, smoked baba ghanoush, marshmallow bouquet; Entrée: elk ribeye, ancho chili liqueur, marrow bones, fava beans; Dessert: creme brûlée ice cream, pineapple, shredded coconut, smoked salmon candy; Contestants: Alex Garfinkel, Chef and Owner from Philadelphia, PA (eliminated after the appetizer); Juan Rivera, Executive Chef from Washington D.C (eliminated after the entrée); Lance McWhorter, Chef from Dallas, TX (eliminated after the dessert); Denise Shavandy, Executive Chef from Fort Worth, TX (winner); Notes: The theme of this episode was smoke. The chefs were required to smoke something in every dish and they were provided stovetop smokers, smoking guns, and various flavored wood chips.
529	7	"Clambake Stakes"	Marc Murphy, Alex Guarnaschelli, and Geoffrey Zakarian	February 18, 2020
Ingredients: Appetizer: blood clams, baby corn on the cob, avocado cocktail, smoked alligator sausage; Entrée: razor clams, watermelon gazpacho, freeze-dried potatoes, lobster; Dessert: chocolate seashells, blackberries, kelp pickles, pearl sugar; Contestants: Alex MacDonald, Sous Chef and Owner from Boston, MA (eliminated after the appetizer); Nancy Longo, Chef and Owner from Baltimore, MD (eliminated after the entrée); Derrick Marquiss, Chef de Cuisine from Newport, RI (eliminated after the dessert); Erik Kwan, Executive Chef from New York, NY (winner); Notes: The theme of this episode was "clambakes" with associated clambake and summery, beach ingredients in every basket.
530	8	"Poke Power"	Amanda Freitag, Tiffani Faison, and Scott Conant	June 2, 2020
Ingredients: Appetizer: poke pizza, tomatillos, cuttlefish, roasted red peppers; Entrée: doubles, purple spinach, pork melts, sweet & sour gummies; Dessert: black pepper syrup, strawberries, cottage cheese, honey butter potato chips; Contestants: Sarah Ravitz, Chef from Washington D.C (eliminated after the appetizer); Phil DeMaiolo, Executive Chef from New York, NY (eliminated after the entrée); Cristina Espinosa, Chef from Belmont, CA (eliminated after the dessert); Ethan Speizer, Estate Chef from Napa, CA (winner)

=== Season 43 (2019–20) ===
No. overall	No. in season	Title	Judges	Original release date
531	1	"Grills On! Game On!"	Maneet Chauhan, Amanda Freitag, and Moe Cason	July 9, 2019
Ingredients: Appetizer: flame beets, oysters, grilled apple crisp, yak ribeye; Entrée: country-style ribs, okra, frozen pizza, Worcestershire sauce; Dessert: giant s'more, double-smoked bacon, grapes, BBQ cocktail; Contestants: Andrew Mercado, Chef & Owner from New York, NY (eliminated after the appetizer); Laine Myers, Executive Chef from Richmond, VA (eliminated after the entrée); Corey Cash, Chef & Owner from New York, NY (eliminated after the dessert); Ed Randolph, Owner & Pitmaster from Newburgh, NY (winner); Notes: This was a grilling episode where the ovens and the fryer could not be used.
532	2	"Beef Cake Mistake"	Geoffrey Zakarian, Amanda Freitag, and Chris Santos	July 30, 2019
Ingredients: Appetizer: chanterelle mushrooms, cascara soda, red pistachio nuts, beef cake; Entrée: fluke, chicken Parmesan tacos, escarole, flying saucer candies; Dessert: marshmallow cereal treats, dragon fruit, yucca chips, yuzu mayonnaise; Contestants: Maylin Chavez, Chef & Owner from Portland, OR (eliminated after the appetizer); Carlo Lamagna, Chef & Owner from Portland, OR (eliminated after the entrée); Michael Touranjoe, Sous Chef from West Hartford, CT (eliminated after the dessert); Claudio Cristofoli, Executive Chef from New York, NY (winner); Notes: The beef cake in the first round was cooked steak, skewered onto a cake prop, and covered in edible flowers.
533	3	"Epic Burgers!"	Maneet Chauhan, Marc Murphy, and Angie Mar	August 6, 2019
Ingredients: Appetizer: cheeseburger tower, bananas, peanut butter & jelly in a jar, ground emu; Entrée: crab legs, Brussels sprouts, chuck roast, yellow snack cakes; Dessert: pineapple, cherry ketchup, edible brownie batter, pretzel buns; Contestants: Heather Fuller, Chef & Owner from Brooklyn, NY (eliminated after the appetizer); Nick Pasco, Executive Chef from Baltimore, MD (eliminated after the entrée); Colten Lemmer, Executive Chef from San Diego, CA (eliminated after the dessert); Kevin Templeton, Executive Chef from San Diego, CA (winner); Notes: This episode focused on "epic burgers" with a pantry full of burger toppings and every basket containing a burger or burger ingredient.
534	4	"Hot Dog Hot Shots"	Maneet Chauhan, Alex Guarnaschelli, and Scott Conant	August 20, 2019
Ingredients: Appetizer: cold hot dog pie, daikon radish, coriander chutney, mini bread loaves; Entrée: Denver steaks, potato mille-feuille, kale sprouts, spray cheese; Dessert: preserved rice juice, red Anjou pears, cookie butter, honey cake; Contestants: Dave Mallari, Chef and Owner from Portland, ME (eliminated after the appetizer); Matt Harker, Private Chef from Boston, MA (eliminated after the entrée); Bryce Sorem, Executive Chef from New York, NY (eliminated after the dessert); Kristol Bryant, Chef and Owner from Philadelphia, PA (winner)
535	5	"A Very Brady Chopped"	Maureen McCormick, Christopher Knight, and Susan Olsen	August 27, 2019
Ingredients: Appetizer: pork chops, apple sauce, frozen mixed vegetables, cheese ball; Entrée: deflated cheese soufflé, ground round, rutabaga, bacon-wrapped water chestnuts; Dessert: burnt toast, marshmallow spread, cocktail nuts, melon salad; Contestants: Emily Brungo, Writer from Baltimore, MD (eliminated after the appetizer); Katrina Dudley, Stay-At-Home Mom from Ridgewood, NJ (eliminated after the entrée); Kelly Dias, Health Care Service Coordinator from Beaver Meadows, PA (eliminated after the dessert); Luke Marschark, Copywriter from Buffalo, NY (winner); Notes: This is the first of two special "Brady Bunch" themed episodes with basket ingredients inspired by Brady Bunch episodes and the 1970s. Home cooks competed and were judged by three of the six kids from the show.
536	6	"Brady Bunch Bash"	Barry Williams, Eve Plumb, and Mike Lookinland	September 3, 2019
Ingredients: Appetizer: edible tiki necklace, Hawaiian sweet crab, hearts of palm, pineapple teriyaki chicken; Entrée: tarantula, Hawaiian bigeye ahi belly, bok choy, canned spiced ham; Dessert: popcorn, Mai Tai, rambutan, burnt beans; Contestants: Emily Trotochaud, Online Marketer from Boston, MA (eliminated after the appetizer); Joey Camasta, Hair and Makeup Artist from New York, NY (eliminated after the entrée); Stephanie Clinton, Blogger and YouTuber from Norman, OK (eliminated after the dessert); Sang Park, Thermal Systems Engineer from Swampscott, MA (winner); Notes: This is the second special "Brady Bunch" episode. The basket ingredients were inspired by the Brady Bunch Hawaiian episodes. Home cooks competed and were judged by three of the six kids from the show. The edible tiki in Round 1 was a sugar cookie decorated with edible ink to look like a tiki. The burned beans in round three were French-style candy-covered peanuts.
537	7	"Ooey, Gooey Cheese!"	Marc Murphy, Maneet Chauhan, and Geoffrey Zakarian	September 10, 2019
Ingredients: Appetizer: cheese fry tower, Swiss chard, sliced rib-eye steak, corn & cheese ice cream; Entrée: lobster, fondue, roasted spaghetti squash, deep-fried grilled cheese; Dessert: rainbow mozzarella sticks, spray cheese, honeycrisp apples, biscotti; Contestants: Alan J. "AJ" Cohen, Chef and Owner from New Rochelle, NY (eliminated after the appetizer); Althea Grey Potter, Chef from Portland, OR (eliminated after the entrée); Greg Smith, Executive Chef from Portland, OR (eliminated after the dessert); Shachi Mehra, Chef and Owner from Orange County, CA (winner); Notes: The chefs were required to make melty, "ooey, gooey" cheese dishes, and there was cheese in every basket.
538	8	"Sweets Showdown: Chocolate!"	Chris Santos, Amanda Freitag, and Valerie Bertinelli	October 1, 2019
Ingredients: Appetizer: bonbon book, Japanese pink strawberries, poblano chile liqueur, stone-ground Mexican chocolate; Entrée: giant hot chocolate, banana vinegar, sea grapes, blue cheese; Dessert: chocolate high heel, canned ham, dulce leaves, passion fruit; Contestants: Sandra Hakim, Chocolatier and Owner from New York, NY (eliminated after the appetizer); Aurora Wold, Pastry Chef and Owner from Philadelphia, PA (eliminated after the entrée); Robert Gonzalez, Executive Pastry Chef from Concord, MA (eliminated after the dessert); Ivan Marquez, Pastry Chef from Los Angeles, CA (winner); Notes: This is the first part of a five-part sweet-focused tournament with a different dessert in every episode of the tournament. The winner of each preliminary round advanced to the finale, where they competed for a grand prize of $50,000. This episode centered around chocolate, and the pantry was filled with various chocolates and sweet ingredients. The chefs had 30 minutes for each of three dessert rounds; the first round had spicy chocolate desserts, the second round had salty chocolate desserts, and the third round had sweet chocolate desserts.
539	9	"Sweets Showdown: Doughnuts!"	Maneet Chauhan, Scott Conant, and Zac Young	October 8, 2019
Ingredients: Appetizer: doughnut tower, cipollini onions, rhubarb, chocolate ghee; Entrée: lobster, pink variegated lemons, glazed doughnuts, roasted marrow bones; Dessert: doughnut cheesecake, grasshoppers, plums, toe jam jelly; Contestants: Jewel Johnson, Consulting Pastry Chef from New York, NY (eliminated after the appetizer); Stephanie Thornton, Pastry Chef from Portland, OR (eliminated after the entrée); Caroline Schiff, Chef and Owner from New York, NY (eliminated after the dessert); Tarran Hatton, Pastry Chef and Owner from New York, NY (winner); Notes: This is the second part of a five-part sweet-focused tournament. This episode centered around doughnuts. The pantry was filled with various decorative toppings, and there was preheated oil on each stove and an extra fryer. The chefs had 30 minutes for each dessert round; the first round had to feature sweet doughnuts, the second round had to feature savory doughnuts, and the third round had to feature filled doughnuts. The toe jam jelly in round 3 was made of tangerine, orange, and elderberries.
540	10	"Sweets Showdown: Cake!"	Alex Guarnaschelli, Chris Santos, and Sylvia Weinstock	October 15, 2019
Ingredients: Appetizer: naked cake, squid ink, raspberries, honeycomb tripe; Entrée: drip cake, figs, tomato soup, Swiss chard; Dessert: mirror glazed cake, crunchy cheese curls, blueberries, duck fat; Contestants: Brigitte Oger, Pastry Chef and Owner from Charlotte, NC (eliminated after the appetizer); Asha-Le Davis, Head Baker from Boston, MA (eliminated after the entrée); Ryan Butler, Pastry Chef and Co-Owner from New York, NY (eliminated after the dessert); Rachel Klemek, Pastry Chef and Owner from San Diego, CA (winner); Notes: This is the third part of a five-part sweet-focused tournament. This episode centered around cake, and the pantry was filled with various edible decorations. The chefs had 30 minutes for the first round, 45 minutes for the second round, and one hour for the third round. The first round featured cupcakes, the second round was bundt cakes, and the third round was layer cakes.
541	11	"Sweets Showdown: Ice Cream!"	Marc Murphy, Maneet Chauhan, and Florian Bellanger	October 22, 2019
Ingredients: Appetizer: oversized milkshake, salt & pepper, sea buckthorn berries, haggis; Entrée: classic ice cream sandwiches, mayonnaise, pomegranates, Cerignola olives; Dessert: deluxe banana split, black garlic, port wine, emu egg; Contestants: James DiStefano, Executive Pastry Chef from Woodside, NY (eliminated after the appetizer); Emma Taylor, Chef and Owner from Jersey City, NJ (eliminated after the entrée); Emily Drucker, Pastry Sous Chef and Co-Owner from New York, NY (eliminated after the dessert); Daniela Martinez, Pastry Chef and Owner from San Diego, CA (winner); Notes: This is the fourth part of a five-part sweet-focused tournament. This episode centered around ice cream. The pantry was filled with various sweet toppings, and extra ice cream machines were provided. The chefs made an ice cream dessert each round; the first round had to feature milkshakes, the second round had to feature ice cream sandwiches, and the third round had to feature ice cream sundaes.
542	12	"Sweets Showdown: Grand Finale!"	Marc Murphy, Alex Guarnaschelli, and Martha Stewart	October 29, 2019
Ingredients: Appetizer: whipped cream, frozen stuffed shells, Buddha's hand, hibiscus flowers in syrup; Entrée: giant frozen margarita, corn nuts, marshmallow snowballs, beets; Dessert: lemon verbena, elderberries, pâte à choux dough, 'candelabra'; Contestants: Tarran Hatton, Pastry Chef and Owner from New York, NY (eliminated after the appetizer); Ivan Marquez, Pastry Chef from Los Angeles, CA (eliminated after the entrée); Rachel Klemek, Pastry Chef and Owner from San Diego, CA (eliminated after the dessert); Daniela Martinez, Pastry Chef and Owner from San Diego, CA (winner); Notes: This is the final part of a five-part sweet-focused tournament, and all three rounds were 30 minutes. The pantry had several types of baked goods and sweet toppings, as well as extra ice cream machines and a cotton candy machine. The first round dessert had to include a whipped element. The second round dessert had to feature an icy element. The third round dessert had to feature a flambéd element, and the third round's final basket ingredient was a lighted "candelabra" made of white chocolate candles filled with vanilla pudding.
543	13	"Give it a Nest!"	Chris Santos, Geoffrey Zakarian, and Eduardo Garcia	February 25, 2020
Ingredients: Appetizer: venison tri-tip, lacy cauliflower, sweet potato, bird's nests; Entrée: oyster mushrooms, blueberry vodka, bison tenderloin, stinging nettles; Dessert: beer flour, jalapeño peppers, camel milk, crunchy fruit candy; Contestants: Rachael Collins, Executive Sous Chef from Boston, MA (eliminated after the appetizer); Glenroy Brown, Executive Chef from New York, NY (eliminated after the entrée); Khalil Aman, Sous Chef from Boston, MA (eliminated after the dessert); Marla Thurman, Chef de Cuisine from Durham, NC (winner); Notes: The bird's nests in the first round were chocolate "nests" with candy "eggs" inside.

=== Season 44 (2019–20) ===
No. overall	No. in season	Title	Judges	Original release date
544	1	"Horror Flick Halloween"	Marc Murphy, Amanda Freitag, and Rose McGowan	September 24, 2019
Ingredients: Appetizer: blood sausage, beets, split pea soup, 'maggot' cupcakes; Entrée: calf liver, fava beans, Chianti, 'severed fingers'; Dessert: witches' brew, chocolate skull, Anjou pears, 'eyeball' dip; Contestants: Jae Lee, Chef and Owner from New York, NY (eliminated after the appetizer); Luis Escorcia, Executive Chef from Portland, OR (eliminated after the entrée); Matt Hummel, Chef de Cuisine from Boston, MA (eliminated after the dessert); Cara Hermanson, Pastry Chef from New York, NY (winner); Notes: This was a Halloween themed episode. The ingredients in every basket were inspired by horror films. The pea soup in Round 1 was meant to evoke 'The Exorcist'. The "maggots" on the Round 1 cupcakes were made of fondant. The liver, fava beans and the chianti in round 2 were a reference to 'The Silence of the Lambs'. The "severed fingers" in Round 2 were shortbread cookies shaped and colored to look like fingers. The "eyeball dip" in Round 3 was a scoop of sweetened cream cheese with a kiwi and blueberry iris and pupil in a pool of raspberry coulis.
545	2	"No Meat? No Problem!"	Chris Santos, Alex Guarnaschelli, and Kimbal Musk	November 5, 2019
Ingredients: Appetizer: buffalo cauliflower, portobello mushrooms, basil, meatless burger patties; Entrée: spinach lasagna, eggplant, kale chips, beet liqueur; Dessert: rhubarb, yogurt, dates, tomato macarons; Contestants: Joya Carlton, Private Chef and Consultant from New York, NY (eliminated after the appetizer); Ian Knauer, Chef and Owner from Titusville, NJ (eliminated after the entrée); Jonathan Dearden, Executive Chef from Washington, DC (eliminated after the dessert); Jeffrey Salazar, Executive Chef from Cambridge, MA (winner); Notes: This was a vegetarian and vegan-themed episode where the chefs had to make meatless dishes. The tomato macarons in Round 3 were actually strawberry flavored, made to look like tomatoes with green icing vines.
546	3	"Thanksgiving Champions"	Scott Conant, Alex Guarnaschelli, and Marc Murphy	November 12, 2019
Ingredients: Appetizer: turkey fries, turnips, duck fat, peanut butter cookie turkeys; Entrée: spicy cheese curl crusted turkey, kabocha squash, purple sweet potato pie, liverwurst; Dessert: gummy turkey leg, dried persimmon, pumpkin muffin mix, cranberry chutney; Contestants: Melvin "Boots" Johnson, Executive Chef from New York, NY (2018 Grill Masters winner. Charity: Project EATS) (eliminated after the appetizer); Christian Petroni, Chef and Restaurateur from Greenwich, CT ($50,000 Tournament competitor. Charity: Romeo Milio Lynch Syndrome Foundation) (eliminated after the entrée); Adriana Urbina, Chef and Owner from New York, NY (Chopped Champs Throwdown winner. Charity: Cuatro Por Venezuela) (eliminated after the dessert); Chris Holland, Executive Chef from Sparkill, NY (Alton's Challenge winner. Charity: National Multiple Sclerosis Society) (winner); Notes: Four chefs who won past episodes and competed in Chopped tournaments return to win money for their charity of choice in this Thanksgiving episode. Food Network made a donation to the charities of each eliminated chef.
547	4	"Thanksgiving Heroes"	Marc Murphy, Maneet Chauhan, and Scott Conant	November 19, 2019
Ingredients: Appetizer: spiral honey ham, buttermilk biscuit dough, mixed beets, pumpkin spice creamer; Entrée: turkey cutlets, sweet potato leaves, candy corn mix, bluefoot mushrooms; Dessert: caramel apples, turkey gravy mix, pomegranate seeds, pumpkin martini; Contestants: Reid Evans, FoodCorps Service Member from South Orange, NJ (eliminated after the appetizer); Sherry Hughes, Culinary Director from Boston, MA (eliminated after the entrée); Eileen Murphy, Second Grade Teacher from Dover, NH (eliminated after the dessert); Kori Heyward, Police Officer from Washington, DC (winner); Notes: This was a Thanksgiving episode featuring amateur cooks who serve their communities. The Food Network gave a gift certificate to each eliminated contestant.
548	5	"Meat Fight"	Scott Conant, Chris Santos, and Angie Mar	November 26, 2019
Ingredients: Appetizer: dino beef ribs, cherry coconut meat bars, iceberg wedge, morel mushrooms; Entrée: porterhouse steaks, Salisbury steak frozen dinner, beefsteak tomatoes, green chickpeas; Dessert: chocolate meat cookies, bresaola, polenta, muscat grapes; Contestants: Adam Schuller, Chef de Cuisine from Portland, OR (eliminated after the appetizer); Tomer Avital, Executive Chef from New York, NY (eliminated after the entrée); James "Mac" Moran, Executive Chef from New York, NY (eliminated after the dessert); Chris Coleman, Executive Chef from Charlotte, NC (winner); Notes: This episode featured beef in every basket. The iceberg wedge in the first round was a fully dressed salad with bacon, tomatoes, and blue cheese dressing.
549	6	"Holiday Sweethearts"	Amanda Freitag, Alex Guarnaschelli, and Scott Conant	December 3, 2019
Ingredients: Appetizer: Hanukkah pasta, lamb shanks, silver platter of sweets, figs; Entrée: pork crown roast, Swiss chard, chestnuts, bûche de Noël; Dessert: gingerbread mansion, cherries, Colombian hot chocolate, olive Christmas tree; Contestants: Chris Santos and Natalie McKenna (Charity: Rett Syndrome Research Trust) (eliminated after the appetizer); Marc Murphy and Pamela Murphy (Charity: Joyful Heart Foundation) (eliminated after the entrée); Geoffrey Zakarian and Margaret Williams (Charity: City Harvest) (eliminated after the dessert); Maneet Chauhan and Vivek Deora (Charity: March of Dimes) (winner); Notes: This was a holiday episode where Chopped judges competed in teams with their significant others for their charity of choice. The appetizer round lasted 30 minutes instead of the usual 20 minutes.
550	7	"Holiday Sugar and Spice"	Geoffrey Zakarian, Alex Guarnaschelli, and Amanda Freitag	December 10, 2019
Ingredients: Appetizer: gingerbread wreath, nutmeg with mace, advocaat, pomegranate; Entrée: marshmallow treat snowman, Hanukkah gelt, red Anjou pears, cloves; Dessert: snow globe cake, cinnamon tree leaves, blood oranges, clam-flavored candy canes; Contestants: Mathew Rice, Executive Pastry Chef from Nashville Tennessee (Chopped Desserts! winner. Charity: Second Harvest Food Bank) (eliminated after the appetizer); Ashley Holt, Pastry Chef & Owner from Brooklyn, NY (Chopped Catwalk winner. Charity: Lower Eastside Girls Club) (eliminated after the entrée); Thiago Silva, Executive Pastry Chef from New York, NY (Fabulous Baker Boys winner. Charity: A Place To Turn) (eliminated after the dessert); Melodie Asseraf, Pastry Chef & Owner from New York, NY (Three Cheers for Chocolate! winner. Charity: Save The Whales) (winner); Notes: Returning Chopped champions compete in an all-desserts episode for their charity of choice. Every basket contained at least one sugary ingredient and a spice. Each round was 30 minutes, the time limit for dessert rounds.
551	8	"New Year's Party"	Geoffrey Zakarian, Maneet Chauhan, and Marc Murphy	December 17, 2019
Ingredients: Appetizer: waffle caviar bites, shrimp cocktail, baby spinach, mignonette sauce; Entrée: A5 Wagyu beef, stone crab claws, asparagus with Hollandaise sauce, truffle pasta; Dessert: long stem strawberries, champagne jelly flutes, bundt cake, 24 karat gold candy bar; Contestants: Katy Smith, Executive Chef from San Diego, CA (eliminated after the appetizer); Gustavo Gutierrez, Executive Chef from Airmont, NY (eliminated after the entrée); Amanda Colello, Specialty Chef from Valley Center, CA (eliminated after the dessert); Chris Carriker, Executive Chef from San Diego, CA (winner); Notes: This was a New Year's Eve themed episode with festive basket ingredients that had a luxurious slant. The caviar waffle bites in the first round were waffle sticks topped with caviar, creme fraiche, and chives.
552	9	"Dine On A Dime"	Chris Santos, Marc Murphy, and Giorgio Rapicavoli	December 17, 2019
Ingredients: Appetizer: fish sticks, barbecue sauce, (canned) mandarin oranges, edamame; Entrée: imperfect okra, brown lentils, canned tomatoes, chicken feet; Dessert: vanilla cake mix, black beans, plantains, $2.00 Cabernet Sauvignon; Contestants: Andrew De Lello, Private Chef from New York, NY (eliminated after the appetizer); Jeremy "Rock" Smith, Executive Chef from Stockbridge, MA (eliminated after the entrée); Drew Bent, Executive Chef from San Diego, CA (eliminated after the dessert); Fernanda Tapia, Chef and Co-Owner from Boston, MA (winner); Notes: The basket ingredients in this episode were inexpensive and budget-friendly; some of the more expensive ingredients normally found in the pantry were removed. This originally aired as a second new episode immediately following the 'New Year's Party' episode above.
553	10	"Eyes on the Prize"	Chris Santos, Amanda Freitag, and Geoffrey Zakarian	March 3, 2020
Ingredients: Appetizer: vegan pork, pecan kringle, mixed beet blush, moringa powder; Entrée: lamb shoulder, spaghetti sushi, burrata, baby artichokes; Dessert: frog eye salad, papaya, Negroni, dried mulberries; Contestants: Humberto Guallpa, Executive Chef from New York, NY (eliminated after the appetizer); Michael Serpa, Owner & Executive Chef from Boston, MA (eliminated after the entrée); Christian Speero, Executive Sous Chef from Bensalem, PA (eliminated after the dessert); Michele Hunter, Executive Chef from Saratoga Springs, NY (winner)
554	11	"A Pretty Pickle Pizza"	Chris Santos, Maneet Chauhan, and Geoffrey Zakarian	March 10, 2020
Ingredients: Appetizer: tuna loin, asparagus, red quinoa, pickle pizza; Entrée: duck breast, snow peas, sweet pepper relish, egg flavored potato chips; Dessert: rose latte, Asian pears, Uzbek naan, peanut brittle; Contestants: Deborah Schneider, Chef and Owner from Newport Beach, CA (eliminated after the appetizer); Saransh Oberoi, Chef and Owner from San Diego, CA (eliminated after the entrée); Xzherieh Norris, Sous Chef from Brooklyn, NY (eliminated after the dessert); Javier Canteras, Chef and Owner from Portland, OR (winner)
555	12	"Lighten Up!"	Maneet Chauhan, Alex Guarnaschelli, and Marc Murphy	May 19, 2020
Ingredients: Appetizer: cod fillets, spinach, oyster mushroom chips, almond coconut bites; Entrée: grass-fed beef tenderloin, parsnips, green pea guacamole, sprouted watermelon seeds; Dessert: low-cal brownie batter, ginger, cantaloupe cake, dill pickle almonds; Contestants: Camillo Sabella, Research & Development Chef from New York, NY (eliminated after the appetizer); Melissa Parks, Private Chef from New York, NY (eliminated after the entrée); Frank Camey, Co-Executive Chef from Wappingers Falls, NY (eliminated after the dessert); Julia Chebotar, Chef & Owner from New York, NY (winner); Notes: The theme of the episode was light, low-calorie dishes with healthy ingredients in each basket.
556	13	"Raise Your Game"	Geoffrey Zakarian, Scott Conant, and Nick Mangold	August 4, 2020
Ingredients: Appetizer: game day subs, tri-color peppers, potato tot skewers, coconut hot sauce; Entrée: chicken wings, spinach artichoke dip, tomatillos, edible beef shooters; Dessert: watermelon helmet, game day cookies, strawberry daiquiri, spiced cereal mix; Contestants: Greg Coccio, Executive Chef from Cranston, RI (eliminated after the appetizer); Matt Safarowic, Chef Partner from Katonah, NY (eliminated after the entrée); Melissa McMillan, Chef and Owner from Portland, OR (eliminated after the dessert); Jackie Rothong, Chef and Food Stylist from New York, NY (winner); Notes: The theme of this episode was gameday, with sports themed foods in every basket. Guest judge Nick Mangold is a retired American football player. The edible beef shooters were little ground beef "cups" filled with a Bloody Mary-based sauce.

=== Season 45 (2020) ===
No. overall	No. in season	Title	Judges	Original release date
557	1	"$50,000 Champs Challenge: Part 1"	Chris Santos, Maneet Chauhan, and Jamie Bissonnette	January 21, 2020
Ingredients: Appetizer: chicken-stuffed watermelon, mushroom ketchup, egg roll wrappers, bok choy; Entrée: lamb neck, natto, white nectarines, street corn nachos; Dessert: longan fruit, matcha cream puffs, chocolate coconut almonds, chow mein noodles; Contestants: Cory Oppold (winner of episode 42.01 – "Eat Your Veggies") (eliminated after the appetizer); Gregory Headen (winner of episode 41.13 – "Brunch Brilliance") (eliminated after the entrée); Brittany Rescigno (winner of episode 42.02 – "Bacon, Burgers and Beer!") (eliminated after the dessert); Fernanda Tapia (winner of episode 44.07 – "Dine On A Dime") (advances to final round) (winner); Notes: Sixteen past Chopped Champions compete in this five-part tournament where the winner gets $50,000. Guest judge Jamie Bissonnette won his season 6 episode ('Chefs on a Mission').
558	2	"$50,000 Champs Challenge: Part 2"	Scott Conant, Chris Santos, and Angie Mar	January 28, 2020
Ingredients: Appetizer: cotenne, red frilly mustard greens, cookie butter, zito lungo; Entrée: tilefish, pickled sausage, corn on the cob, freeze-dried ice cream; Dessert: Caesar salad cake, strawberry gochujang, quince, instant coffee powder; Contestants: Megan Day (winner of "Grill Masters Tournament 2017: Battle 1") (eliminated after the appetizer); Nick LaRosa (winner of episode 41.10 – "Squab Goals") (eliminated after the entrée); Kevin Templeton (winner of episode 42.13 – "Epic Burgers!") (eliminated after the dessert); David Thomas (winner of episode 40.02 – "Thanksgiving Pie, Oh My!") (advances to final round) (winner); Notes: This was part two of a five-part tournament. Guest judge Angie Mar won the second Chopped: Grill Masters tournament. The salad cake in the third round was made up of green sugar wafer paper "lettuce" and shaved white chocolate "parmesan" with vanilla cake croutons.
559	3	"$50,000 Champs Challenge: Part 3"	Marc Murphy, Chris Santos, and Ayesha Nurdjaja	February 4, 2020
Ingredients: Appetizer: chicken hearts, spaghetti ring ice pops, black summer truffles, avocado fries; Entrée: fried chicken bao, turkey breast, horseradish leaves, instant lemon pudding mix; Dessert: babka cheesecake, pickled cherry blossoms, canary melon, bacon brittle; Contestants: Rashad Armstead (winner of episode 42.11 – "Take the Cake") (eliminated after the appetizer); Matt Migliore (winner of episode 41.12 "Belly of the Beast") (eliminated after the entrée); Kristol Bryant (winner of episode 43.02 – "Hot Dog Hot Shots") (eliminated after the dessert); Kristina Wisneski (winner of episode 41.01 – "Wonton Wonder") (winner); Notes: This was part three of a five-part tournament. Guest judge Ayesha Nurdjaja had previously competed in "Judge Knows Best".
560	4	"$50,000 Champs Challenge: Part 4"	Scott Conant, Alex Guarnaschelli, and Christian Petroni	February 11, 2020
Ingredients: Appetizer: geoduck, cucumber kimchi, spring onion, biscuits & sausage gravy; Entrée: squab, chocolate fish, poblano peppers, canned jackfruit; Dessert: dessert pizza, sun-dried bell peppers, huckleberries, purple sweet potatoes; Contestants: Erin Smith (winner of episode 28.10 – "Deadliest Baskets") (eliminated after the appetizer); Joshua Moore (winner of episode 40.10 – "Deadly Catch") (eliminated after the entrée); Laura Gonzales (winner of episode 39.01 – "Wellington Woes") (eliminated after the dessert); Eli Dunn (winner of episode 40.03 "Tea Eggs and Sympathy") (winner); Notes: This was part four of a five-part tournament. Christian Petroni has been a competitor and a guest judge previously. The chocolate fish in the second round was all dark chocolate. The dessert pizza in the third round was a crust topped with chocolate icing and shavings, a cherry, churros, cookies, and doughnuts.
561	5	"$50,000 Champs Challenge: Grand Finale"	Scott Conant, Amanda Freitag, and Giorgio Rapicavoli	February 18, 2020
Ingredients: Appetizer: mixed oca, seaweed salad, paw paw brandy, cod milt; Entrée: octopus corn dogs, pink variegated lemons, tomahawk steaks, potluck potato casserole; Dessert: yogurt soda, carved melons, Serrano ham, ice cream tacos; Contestants: Eli Dunn (winner of episode 40.03 "Tea Eggs and Sympathy") (eliminated after the appetizer); Kristina Wisneski (winner of episode 41.01 – "Wonton Wonder") (eliminated after the entrée); Fernanda Tapia (winner of episode 44.07 – "Dine On A Dime") (eliminated after the dessert); David Thomas (winner of episode 40.02 – "Thanksgiving Pie, Oh My!") (winner); Notes: This was the final part of a five-part tournament. Guest judge Giorgio Rapicavoli competed in the 'Ultimate Champions' tournament.
562	6	"Chock-full of Chocolate"	Geoffrey Zakarian, Alex Guarnaschelli, and Thiago Silva	March 24, 2020
Ingredients: Appetizer: milk & chocolate chip cookies, chocolate-covered shrimp chips, fermented honey, tamarillos; Entrée: kumquats, miso, chocolate ganache tart, spicy chocolate chicken wings; Dessert: white chocolate banana pudding, freeze dried raspberries, sweet beef jerky, ruby chocolate candy bars; Contestants: Sequoya Anderson, Pastry Chef and Owner from New York, NY (eliminated after the appetizer); Penny Stankiewicz, Pastry Chef and Owner from Brooklyn, NY (eliminated after the entrée); Jessica Craig, Executive Pastry Chef from New York, NY (eliminated after the dessert); James Foran, Pastry Chef and Instructor from San Diego, CA (winner); Notes: Pastry chefs competed in this special all-desserts episode with chocolate in every round. In the first round they had to make "crunchy" desserts, in the second round they had to make "gooey" desserts, and in the third round they had to make "fruity" desserts. Guest judge Thiago Silva won his the baking episode season 22, Fabulous Baker Boys.
563	7	"High on the Hog"	Marc Murphy, Amanda Freitag, and Chris Santos	May 26, 2020
Ingredients: Appetizer: Ibérico secreto, Ibérico lagrimas, half sour pickles, pork blood ice cream; Entrée: Berkshire pork rib chops, Berkshire pork bistro ham, green plantains, pig ear bloody Mary; Dessert: pig snouts, boar lonza, red apricots, melon cream soda; Contestants: Jose Soto, Executive Chef from Brooklyn, NY (eliminated after the appetizer); Joey Chavez, Executive Chef from Baltimore, MD (eliminated after the entrée); Emily Mingrone, Chef and Owner from New Haven, CT (eliminated after the dessert); Arthur Dulin, Sous Chef from Portland, OR (winner); Notes: The theme of this episode was pork in every basket.
564	8	"Soda Flop"	Marc Murphy, Amanda Frietag, and David Burtka	June 16, 2020
Ingredients: Appetizer: fish heads, pea shoots, white asparagus, chicken pot pie; Entrée: baked cacio e pepe, rock shrimp, mustard greens, butter-flavored soda; Dessert: peaches, rosemary, pretzel shortbread, chicken & waffles taffy; Contestants: Jason Hanelt, Executive Chef from Boston, MA (eliminated after the appetizer); David Sierra, Executive Chef from Washington D.C. (eliminated after the entrée); Matt McPherson, Chef and Owner from Boston, MA (eliminated after the dessert); Maame Boakye, Private Chef from New York, NY (winner); Notes: David Burtka was a celebrity guest judge for this episode. The fish heads in the first basket were from salmon.
565	9	"Terrine Cuisine"	Chris Santos, Scott Conant, and Erik Ramirez	June 23, 2020
Ingredients: Appetizer: rabbit terrine, guanciale, spring garlic, burger meal mix; Entrée: beer ramen, sablefish, corn on the cob, lemon cake mix; Dessert: feta ice cream, pears, blueberry ketchup, chocolate-covered espresso beans; Contestants: Jose Luis Chavez, Chef and Owner from New York, NY (eliminated after the appetizer); Matt Greiner, Executive Chef from Raleigh, NC (eliminated after the entrée); Mimi Weissenborn, Executive Chef from Harlem, NY (eliminated after the dessert); Nemo Bolin, Chef and Owner from Providence, RI (winner); Notes: The burger meal mix in round 1 was Salisbury flavored. The beer ramen in round 2 was actually ramen in a glass with a "beer" broth and egg whites "foam".
566	10	"Time and Turmoil"	Amanda Freitag, Maneet Chauhan, and Scott Conant	June 30, 2020
Ingredients: Appetizer: hash brown patties, Manila clams, escarole, blooming quesadilla; Entrée: dried cuttlefish, sweetbreads, kohlrabi, beet hummus; Dessert: boozy cranberry gelatin, cherry scones, nectarines, seaweed coated peanuts; Contestants: Lindsay Smith-Rosales, Chef and Owner from Laguna Beach, CA (eliminated after the appetizer); Arden Lewis, Executive Chef from New York, NY (eliminated after the entrée); Lina Zarcaro, Private Chef from Bradley Beach, NJ (eliminated after the dessert); Luca Annunziata, Executive Chef from Charlotte, NC (winner)
567	11	"Jarring Jars"	Scott Conant, Geoffrey Zakarian, and Ray Garcia	July 7, 2020
Ingredients: Appetizer: sea beans, dehydrated carrot sticks, egg coffee, beef heart; Entrée: lo mein cupcakes, monkfish tails, squash blossoms, cowboy candy; Dessert: guava, kefir, honeycomb, pickled pig lips; Contestants: May Siricharoen, Executive Chef from Los Angeles, CA (eliminated after the appetizer); Chris Day, Executive Sous Chef from Boston, MA (eliminated after the entrée); Patrick McKee, Executive Chef from Portland, OR (eliminated after the dessert); Phillip Esteban, Research & Development Chef from San Diego, CA (winner); Notes: The guest judge in this episode was Chef Ray Garcia. Chef Siricharoen works at Beauty & Essex, which is run by Chopped judge Chris Santos. The cupcake in the second round was a vanilla cupcake with fondant on top shaped to look like lo mein noodles.
568	12	"Cauliflower Power"	Maneet Chauhan, Marc Murphy, and Esther Choi	July 21, 2020
Ingredients: Appetizer: cauliflower avocado toast, cauliflower rice, watercress, huitlacoche; Entrée: kung pao cauliflower, cauliflower gnocchi, blue foot mushrooms, snap peas; Dessert: cauliflower oatmeal, halo-halo fruit mix, red dragon fruit, cauliflower frozen hot chocolate; Contestants: Manjit Manohar, Executive Sous Chef from New York, NY (eliminated after the appetizer); Edy Massih, Private Chef and Caterer from Brooklyn, NY (eliminated after the entrée); Megan Marlow, Executive Chef and Owner from Los Angeles, CA (eliminated after the dessert); Kei Ohdera, Chef and Owner from Portland, OR (winner); Notes: In this episode, cauliflower is featured in each basket.
569	13	"Quail Without Fail"	Chris Santos, Maneet Chauhan, and Geoffrey Zakarian	July 28, 2020
Ingredients: Appetizer: gopchang, ghost pepper aioli, nopales, hominy; Entrée: quail, figs in a blanket, artichokes, anchovies; Dessert: chicken salt, syrniki, passion fruit, cajeta; Contestants: Bryant Kryck, Executive Chef from Portland, OR (eliminated after the appetizer); Caroline Hough, Chef de Cuisine from Philadelphia, PA (eliminated after the entrée); Marco Maestoso, Chef and Owner from San Diego, CA (eliminated after the dessert); Calin Sauvron, Executive Chef from Bethel, CT (winner)

=== Season 46 (2020) ===
No. overall	No. in season	Title	Judges	Original release date
570	1	"Beasts and Bourbon"	Geoffrey Zakarian, Maneet Chauhan, and Eduardo Garcia	July 14, 2020
Ingredients: Appetizer: pineapple upside-down pancakes, mizuna, old fashioned, rack of wild boar; Entrée: bison ribeye, high rye bourbon, collard greens, chitlins; Dessert: elk jerky, wheated bourbon, plums, chunky blue cheese dressing; Contestants: Rob Roy, Sous Chef and Butcher from Portland, OR (eliminated after the appetizer); Ricky Dolinsky, Chef and Owner from New York, NY (eliminated after the entrée); Facundo Kairuz, Sous Chef from New York, NY (eliminated after the dessert); Josephine "Jo" Proul, Chef and Owner from Philmont, NY (winner); Notes: In this themed episode, each basket contained a different type of bourbon and wild game meat.
571	2	"Here to Persevere!"	Amanda Freitag, Marc Murphy, and Kristen Kish	August 11, 2020
Ingredients: Appetizer: sausage-stuffed pancakes on sticks, cocktail fruit slices, ramps, canned clam sauce; Entrée: cherry moonshine, catfish fillets, roasted chickpeas, green tomatoes; Dessert: chè ba màu, strawberry milk powder, cape gooseberries, poor man's toffee; Contestants: Sasha Ariel, Executive Chef from Miami, FL (eliminated after the appetizer); Kayzer Castro, Executive Chef from New York, NY (eliminated after the entrée); Dan Bagnall, Executive Chef from New York, NY (eliminated after the dessert); Kia Damon, Executive Chef from Manhattan, NY (winner)
572	3	"Skilfish Coping Skills"	Geoffrey Zakarian, Amanda Freitag, and Scott Conant	August 18, 2020
Ingredients: Appetizer: scallops, vanilla bean, kumquats, spider crab pâté; Entrée: pickled eggs, skilfish, petite vegetable medley, palm tree pasta noodles; Dessert: lychee, chocolate doughnuts, candy sticks, coconut macaroon nut butter; Contestants: Julio Cancho, Chef and Owner from Norwich, CT (eliminated after the appetizer); Josh Carroll, Private Chef from New York, NY (eliminated after the entrée); Fernanda Peimbert, Banquet Chef from San Diego, CA (eliminated after the dessert); Melanie Shurka, Chef and Owner from New York, NY (winner)
573	4	"Booza Blues"	Marc Murphy, Amanda Freitag, and Geoffrey Zakarian	August 25, 2020
Ingredients: Appetizer: deviled ham spread, shrimp, fennel, yellow hot pepper paste; Entrée: key lime booza ice cream, Cornish hens, fava beans, cola rice; Dessert: pineapple cakes, strawberry cream liqueur, kiwi, sumac; Contestants: Iman Khondker, Sous Chef from Brooklyn, NY (eliminated after the appetizer); Cathy Pavlos, Chef and Owner from Newport Beach, CA (eliminated after the entrée); John Miller, Executive Chef from San Diego, CA (eliminated after the dessert); Zivko Radojcic, Executive Chef from New York, NY (winner); Notes: Chef Iman never cooked the shrimp in the appetizer round; every element on her plates had raw, uncooked shrimp. Therefore, she was automatically eliminated without the judges having to deliberate, as consuming raw or undercooked seafood increases their chances of foodborne illnesses.
574	5	"Sweet and Sour Notes"	Maneet Chauhan, Geoffrey Zakarian, and Amanda Freitag	September 1, 2020
Ingredients: Appetizer: Vietnamese sour soup, pork rib chops, acorn squash, pickled ginger; Entrée: caponata agrodolce, branzino, mangos, puntarelle; Dessert: pineapple vinegar, crema, red currants, pralines; Contestants: Kyo Pang, Chef and Owner from New York, NY (eliminated after the appetizer); Chris Pores, Executive Chef & Caterer from Manhattan, NY (eliminated after the entrée); Brandon Walker, Chef and Owner from Poughkeepsie, NY (eliminated after the dessert); Graeme Gilchrist, Chef de Cuisine from Newburyport, MA (winner); Notes: The theme of this episode was to make sweet and sour dishes in every round.
575	6	"Pass the Popcorn Shoots"	Alex Guarnaschelli, Maneet Chauhan, and Chris Santos	September 8, 2020
Ingredients: Appetizer: egg salad sandwiches, Denver steaks, king oyster mushrooms, puttanesca sauce; Entrée: rabbit legs, dried cod roe, cinnamon sugar pretzels, popcorn shoots; Dessert: bouncy ube cheesecake, chocolate-covered sunflower seeds, Granny Smith apples, lychee wine; Contestants: Gianluca Demontis, Chef & Owner from Philadelphia, PA (eliminated after the appetizer); Cornelia Suhr, Chef de Cuisine from New York, NY (eliminated after the entrée); Nirva Israel, Personal Chef from New York, NY (eliminated after the dessert); Denzell Washington, Freelance Chef from New York, NY (winner); Notes: Egg salad sandwiches provided by local NYC Japanese Restaurant Otaku Katsu.
576	7	"Plumb Loco Moco"	Marc Murphy, Maneet Chauhan, and Scott Conant	September 15, 2020
Ingredients: Appetizer: loco moco, habanero peppers, fish jerky, chocolate-covered potato chips; Entrée: turbot, amaranth leaves, pom pom mushrooms, squeezable bacon-flavored cheese; Dessert: matzo cake, freeze-dried cacao, grapes, broccoli latte; Contestants: CJ Bivona, Chef de Cuisine from New York, NY (eliminated after the appetizer); Holly Rogers, Sous Chef from Los Angeles, CA (eliminated after the entrée); Taylor Knapp, Chef & Owner from Long Island, NY (eliminated after the dessert); Kyo Koo, Chef & Owner from Portland, OR (winner)
577	8	"Soup and Sandwich Savvy"	Scott Conant, Alex Guarnaschelli, and Tiffani Faison	September 22, 2020
Ingredients: Appetizer: huevos haminados, orzo, broccoli rabe, lamb bacon; Entrée: chicken breast fillets, limoncello, duck bones, runner beans; Dessert: mayonnaise, blueberry bagels, mangos, baby food pouches; Contestants: Carolina Gomez, Executive Chef from Hyattsville, MD (eliminated after the appetizer); Jamilah Jean-Louis, Private Chef from New York, NY (eliminated after the entrée); Shalom Yehudiel, Chef & Owner from Teaneck, NJ (eliminated after the dessert); Paul Cao, Chef & Owner from Orange County, CA (winner); Notes: The theme of this episode was soup and sandwiches. The first round was extended to 30 minutes.
578	9	"Want a Gnocchi Sandwich?"	Amanda Freitag, Alex Guarnaschelli, and Giorgio Rapicavoli	September 29, 2020
Ingredients: Appetizer: fish skin chips, skirt steak, dandelion greens, cream of beans with coconut; Entrée: swordfish, long hot red peppers, graffiti eggplant, gnocchi sandwich; Dessert: balsamic pearls, honey pudding, mangosteen, cheese pierogi; Contestants: Mimi Huynh, Chef & Owner from Alexandria, VA (eliminated after the appetizer); Kyronn Cordner, Sous Chef from Tenafly, NJ (eliminated after the entrée); Christina Pancheri, Executive Sous Chef from San Diego, CA (eliminated after the dessert); Chris Edwards, Executive Chef from Washington, D.C. (winner); Notes: The gnocchi sandwich in Round 2 consisted of a gnocchi tossed in a cheese sauce stuffed inside a mozzarella lined pizza dough.
579	10	"Finer Diner Dining"	Scott Conant, Geoffrey Zakarian, and Neil Patrick Harris	October 6, 2020
Ingredients: Appetizer: liver and onions, chef's salad, Idaho potatoes, lemon meringue pie; Entrée: chicken cutlets, carrots, corned beef hash, pancake bread; Dessert: chocolate egg cream, fruit salad with cottage cheese, frosted shredded wheat, breakfast sandwich; Contestants: Kerri Horgan, Executive Chef from Nanuet, NY (eliminated after the appetizer); Elise Walker, Chef de Cuisine from Portland, OR (eliminated after the entrée); Brian McKnight, Executive Chef from Portland, OR (eliminated after the dessert); Marty Freda, Sous Chef from Brooklyn, NY (winner); Notes: This episode featured diner food in every basket with the requirement to plate it in an upscale manner. Neil Patrick Harris was a celebrity guest judge for this episode. Chef Horgan previously worked with regular Chopped judge Alex Guarnaschelli.
580	11	"Pancake Panic"	Chris Santos, Alex Guarnaschelli, and Tiffani Faison	October 13, 2020
Ingredients: Appetizer: blowfish tails, cookie dough pancakes, key limes, squash blossoms; Entrée: seven layer dip, tiramisu liqueur, buffalo tenderloin, ugly vegetable mix; Dessert: white chocolate hazelnut spread, plantain chips, loquats, rainbow sherbet roll; Contestants: Autumn Moultrie, Private Chef from New York, NY (eliminated after the appetizer); Risa Lichtman, Chef & Owner from Portland, OR (eliminated after the entrée); Oz Blackaller, Chef & Owner from San Diego, CA (eliminated after the dessert); Kiel Andersen, Chef de Cuisine from Laguna Beach, CA (winner); Notes: The ugly veggie mix in the entree round contained: beets, kohlrabi, rhubarb, turnips, and carrots.
581	12	"Fries and Thighs"	Scott Conant, Maneet Chauhan, and Tiffani Faison	October 20, 2020
Ingredients: Appetizer: long fries, baby cauliflower, Korean taco sauce, frog legs; Entrée: tornado fries, chicken thighs, okra, bubble tea; Dessert: cookie fries, duck leg confit, rainier cherries, string cheese; Contestants: Shane Roberts, Chef & Owner from Richmond, VA (eliminated after the appetizer); Anthony Pino, Executive Chef from East Boston, MA (eliminated after the entrée); Rebecca Foxman, Chef & Owner from Philadelphia, PA (eliminated after the dessert); Yunha Moh, Chef & Owner from Brooklyn, NY (winner); Notes: Every basket in this episode had a thigh meat protein and a version of french fries. The chefs had to fry something in every round. To accommodate the frying requirement, a second fryer was brought into the Chopped kitchen. The long fries in Round 1 were potatoes puréed and piped into oil to look like a long french fry. The tornado fries in Round 2 were spiralized potatoes fried on a skewer, resembling a continuous curly fry. The cookie fries in Round 3 were actually shortbread cookies shaped like french fries.
582	13	"Dressed for Success"	Alex Guarnaschelli, Maneet Chauhan, and Chris Santos	October 27, 2020
Ingredients: Appetizer: canned spinach, lamb t-bone steaks, linzer cookies, dressed beer; Entrée: yuzu kosho, veal chops, cordyceps, pizza pot pie; Dessert: piggy custard dumplings, lemon balm, white melon, cream-filled rainbow licorice; Contestants: Fabian Gallardo, Chef & Owner from Larchmont, NY (eliminated after the appetizer); Dustin Clark, Executive Chef from Portland, OR (eliminated after the entrée); Penelope Grace, Private Chef from New York, NY (eliminated after the dessert); Yousef Ghalaini, Culinary Director from Boston, MA (winner); Notes: The dressed beer in Round 1 had a spice stuck onto the beer bottle and a candy strip wrapped on the outside.

=== Season 47 (2020–21) ===
No. overall	No. in season	Title	Judges	Original release date
583	1	"Beat the Judge: Alex"	Scott Conant, Amanda Freitag, and Marc Murphy	April 7, 2020
Ingredients: Appetizer: rainbow soup dumplings, snow crab legs, mizuna, cheddar cheese sauce; Entrée: avocado latte, squab, baby bananas in syrup, cured egg yolks; Dessert: vienna sausages, rainbow carrots, pomelos, gooey butter cake; Contestants: Nick Testa, winner of Episode 35.14 - "Weird Twist" (eliminated after the appetizer); Jamaal Taherzadeh, winner of Episode 35.01 - "Better Duck Next Time" (eliminated after the entrée); Jen Biesty, winner of Episode 43.06 - "Weird, Wacky, and Wild!" (eliminated after the dessert); Alex Guarnaschelli (winner); Notes: This is the first of a series of special episodes where three past Chopped Champions competed over the course of two rounds for a chance to cook against a Chopped judge in the final round. This episode featured Alex Guarnaschelli as the Chopped judge to beat.
584	2	"Beat the Judge: Scott"	Amanda Freitag, Geoffrey Zakarian, and Tiffani Faison	April 14, 2020
Ingredients: Appetizer: canned shrimp, popcorn gelato, fennel, mortadella; Entrée: alligator tenderloin, coquito, watermelon radish, pea greens; Dessert: giant can of spaghetti sauce, sunchokes, beef tenderloin, ranch dressing (packets); Contestants: Noam Bilitzer, winner of Episode 36.13 - "Wild Game Plan" (eliminated after the appetizer); Figgy DiBenedetto, winner of Episode 41.07 - "Dollar Dishes" (eliminated after the entrée); Michael Castellon, winner of Episode 35.13 - "Espresso Express" (eliminated after the dessert); Scott Conant (winner); Notes: This is the second of a series of special episodes where three past Chopped Champions competed for a chance to cook against a Chopped judge in the final round. This episode featured Scott Conant as the Chopped judge to beat. In the third round, the chefs made savory courses instead of dessert.
585	3	"Beat the Judge: Tiffani"	Marc Murphy, Maneet Chauhan, and Scott Conant	April 21, 2020
Ingredients: Appetizer: carrot cake soda, mussels, water spinach, crispy chicken snacks; Entrée: shakshuka doughnuts, venison tenderloin, celeriac, ginko nut vinegar; Dessert: 10 pack of tacos, dover sole fillets, canned green beans, chocolate champagne truffles; Contestants: Chris Coleman, winner of Episode 44.03 - "Meat Fight" (eliminated after the appetizer); Kathleen O'Brien-Price, winner of Episode 36.10 - "Luck of the Irish" (eliminated after the entrée); Demetrio Zavala, winner of Episode 31.01 - "Smorgastarta Your Engines" (eliminated after the dessert); Tiffani Faison (winner); Notes: This is the third of a series of special episodes where three past Chopped Champions competed for a chance to cook against a Chopped judge in the final round. This episode featured Tiffani Faison as the Chopped judge to beat. In the third round, they made savory courses instead of dessert.
586	4	"Beat the Judge: Amanda"	Marc Murphy, Geoffrey Zakarian, and Scott Conant	April 28, 2020
Ingredients: Appetizer: chicken gizzards, mangos, zhoug sauce, fish heads; Entrée: rueben nachos, duck breast, broccoli rabe, black truffle peelings; Dessert: omurice, double cut pork chops, rutabaga, champurrado; Contestants: Justin Turner, winner of Episode 27.13 - "The Bold and the Baconful" (eliminated after the appetizer); Rachael Polhill, winner of Episode 38.07 - "Beach Bites" (eliminated after the entrée); Tristen Epps, winner of Episode 35.18 - "Amped for Ramps" (eliminated after the dessert); Amanda Freitag (winner); Notes: This is the fourth of a series of special episodes where three past Chopped Champions competed for a chance to cook against a Chopped judge in the final round. This episode featured Amanda Freitag as the Chopped judge to beat. The fish heads in round 1 were from cod. In the third round, they made savory courses instead of dessert.
587	5	"Beat the Judge: Marc"	Scott Conant, Amanda Freitag, and Geoffrey Zakarian	May 5, 2020
Ingredients: Appetizer: escargot, beet & cashew butter, peas, pecorino cheese; Entrée: super spicy Mexican corn, octopus, pears, black bean garlic sauce; Dessert: roasted lamb intestines, Denver steaks, okra, mint chocolate chip cookie dough; Contestants: Eric Felitto, winner of Episode 39.04 - "Breakfast Battle" (eliminated after the appetizer); Shacafrica Simmons, winner of Episode 34.03 - "Greater Tater" (eliminated after the entrée); Jillian Moskites, winner of Episode 36.09 - "Epic Eats" (eliminated after the dessert); Marc Murphy (winner); Notes: This is the fifth of a series of special episodes where three past Chopped Champions competed for a chance to cook against a Chopped judge in the final round. This episode featured Marc Murphy as the Chopped judge to beat. In the third round, they made savory courses instead of dessert.
588	6	"Beat the Judge: Maneet"	Amanda Freitag, Geoffrey Zakarian, and Tiffani Faison	May 12, 2020
Ingredients: Appetizer: beef tendon balls, grapes, Italian long hots, toaster pastry cereal; Entrée: red snapper, zucchini blossoms, antipasto tree, date syrup; Dessert: hummus ice cream, cherries, turmeric, chocolate snack cakes; Contestants: Dave Martin, winner of Episode 35.17 - "Cocktail Party" (eliminated after the appetizer); Anna Vocaturo, winner of Episode 34.09 - "You've Got Snail" (eliminated after the entrée); Tara Khattar, winner of Episode 37.07 - "Rocky Mountain Masters" (eliminated after the dessert); Maneet Chauhan (winner); Notes: This is the final special episode where three past Chopped Champions competed for a chance to cook against a Chopped judge. This episode featured Maneet Chauhan as the Chopped judge to beat.
589	7	"Beat Bobby Flay: Battle 1"	Geoffrey Zakarian, Marc Murphy, and Bobby Flay	August 9, 2020
Ingredients: Appetizer: Japanese fruit sandwich, red shrimp, black radishes, white truffle hot sauce; Entrée: beef liver bites, cuttlefish, shiso leaves, cauliflower hummus; Dessert: confetti cake banana pudding, smoked duck bacon, baby corn, toffee chips; Contestants: Joe Johnson, winner of Grill Masters 2017 (eliminated after the appetizer); Chris Holland, winner of Alton's Challenge and Thanksgiving Champions (eliminated after the entrée); Adriana Urbina, winner of Latin Cuisine Dream and Chopped Champs Throwdown, runner-up of Thanksgiving Champions (eliminated after the dessert); Stephen Coe, winner of Grill Masters 2017 Battle 3 and Ultimate Redemption, runner-up of Grill Masters 2017 finale (advances to final round) (winner); Notes: Part one of a five-part tournament featuring 16 past winners. The winner of each heat advances to the finals for a chance to cook against Bobby Flay and win $50,000. This heat featured four repeat winners who were in the final two of past tournaments.
590	8	"Beat Bobby Flay: Battle 2"	Scott Conant, Chris Santos, and Bobby Flay	August 16, 2020
Ingredients: Appetizer: sushi burgers, sea cress, lotus root, ras el hanout; Entrée: frozen chili cheese dogs, antelope rib rack, oka, blackberry syrup; Dessert: gummy bear tart, cocoa nibs, guava, popcorn shoots; Contestants: Yuri Szarzewski (winner of Episode 38.3 – "Bowled Over") (eliminated after the appetizer); Sophina Uong (winner of Grill Masters Napa) (eliminated after the entrée); Lee Knoeppel (winner of Episode 31.4 – "Midnight Snack Attack") (eliminated after the dessert); Andre Fowles (winner of Episode 27.9 – "Cooking Caribbean" and Episode 28.4 – "Chopped Champions: Battle 4, Kitchen Storm", runner-up of Episode 28.5 – "Chopped Champions: Conclusion, $50,000 Pay Day") (advances to final round) (winner); Notes: Part two of a five-part tournament. This heat had two repeat winners who were in the final two of past tournaments, and two past winners who have only previously competed in their debut episodes.
591	9	"Beat Bobby Flay: Battle 3"	Christian Petroni, Amanda Freitag, and Bobby Flay	August 23, 2020
Ingredients: Appetizer: yak burgers, rainbow cookie cake, huckleberry potatoes, comté cheese; Entrée: canned stuffed jalapeños, royale dorade, citrus coriander, lemon dessert; Dessert: Watergate salad, coconut sugar, Asian long beans, kombucha; Contestants: Emily Chapman (winner of Episode 21.13 – "Money Saver", Episode 35.12 – "An Iron Chef Thanksgiving", and Chopped: Impossible) (eliminated after the appetizer); Tatiana Rosana (winner of Episode 37.8 - "Under the Cuban Sun" and Episode 40.6 – "Chopped Champs Throwdown: Battle 3") (eliminated after the entrée); Meny Vaknin (winner of Episode 22.11 - "Hot Stuff" and Episode 28.1 - "Chopped Champions: Battle 1, Best of the Best") (eliminated after the dessert); Evan Hennessey (winner of Episode 37.5 - "Leftover Takeover" and Episode 40.4 – "Chopped Champs Throwdown: Battle 1") (advances to final round) (winner); Notes: Part three of a five-part tournament. The chefs in this heat previously competed in the finales of past champions tournaments, with Chef Chapman being the only past grand champion. The rainbow cookie cake in Round 1 was reminiscent of an Italian rainbow cookie with red, white, and green colors made with almond and topped with chocolate and raspberry jam in-between each layer. The "lemon dessert" in Round 2 consisted of an edible shell made to look like a lemon filled with lemon gelee and a mousse that contained lemongrass and green cardamom.
592	10	"Beat Bobby Flay: Battle 4"	Tiffani Faison, Marc Murphy, and Bobby Flay	August 30, 2020
Ingredients: Appetizer: pizza bites, chicken confit, graffiti eggplant, caviar; Entrée: dirty fries, boar tenderloin, watermelon, haricot verts; Dessert: head cheese, sweet & sour cereal, figs, queso fresco; Contestants: Aarthi Sampath (winner of Episode 29.2 – "Snail Snafus") (eliminated after the appetizer); Seis Kamimura (winner of Episode 24.11 – "Tailgate Fate") (eliminated after the entrée); Bradley Stellings (winner of Episode 23.3 – "Chopped Again!") (eliminated after the dessert); Jay Abrams (winner of Episode 27.6 – "Bacon Boys") (advances to final round) (winner); Notes: Part four of a five-part tournament. All four contestants in this episode previously competed in the first Chopped "Beat Bobby Flay" tournament. The "dirty fries" in round 2 included tortilla chips, chili, beans, sour cream, and jalapeños. The "head cheese" in Round 3 was made from the head of a pig.
593	11	"Beat Bobby Flay: Finale Fight"	Christian Petroni, Tiffani Faison, Chris Santos, and Marcus Samuelsson, Maneet Chauhan, Scott Conant**	September 6, 2020
Ingredients: Appetizer: stuffed doughnuts, pig kidneys, upland cress, dried mangosteen; Entrée: tilefish, lacy cauliflower, potted meat, rhubarb liqueur; Dessert: ("Beat Bobby" round) lobster, dried duck, salty fingers, deep-fried milk; Contestants: Jay Abrams (winner of Episode 27.6 – "Bacon Boys") (eliminated after the appetizer); Evan Hennessey (winner of Episode 37.5 - "Leftover Takeover" and Episode 40.4 – "Chopped Champs Throwdown: Battle 1") ("chopped 1st in entreé")* and Andre Fowles (winner of Episode 27.9 – "Cooking Caribbean" and Episode 28.4 – "Chopped Champions: Battle 4, Kitchen Storm") ("chopped 2nd in entreé")* (eliminated after the entrée); Bobby Flay (eliminated after the dessert); Stephen Coe (winner of Episode 41.1 - "Ultimate Redemption" and runner-up of Grill Masters 2017) (winner); Notes: Part five of a five-part tournament. Because the episode was 60 minutes and but four chefs versus three, two chefs were eliminated in the entreé round, and only the entreé round factored into the judges' decision. The stuffed doughnuts in Round 1 were stuffed with vanilla ice cream that was covered in rainbow sprinkles. The potted meat in Round 2 was made with chicken and pork. The deep-fried milk in Round 3 was sweet custard thickened with corn starch, then breaded and deep-fried. This round simulated the format of Beat Bobby Flay, with a 45 minute final round. Lobster ravioli was Stephen's choice in Round 3. At the end of Round 3, the judges in Rounds 1 and 2 were replaced with new judges for a blind taste test; Ted presented each dish.
594	12	"Pickle Panic"	Amanda Freitag, Scott Conant, and Eddie Jackson (chef)	December 29, 2020
Ingredients: Appetizer: pickle bouquet, beer battered shrimp, broccolini, sour trahana; Entrée: chocolate peanut butter french toast, Limburger cheese, acorn squash, culotte steaks; Dessert: rainbow crepes, passion fruit, giant candy sticks, salted egg yolk cookies; Contestants: Drew Hiatt, Executive Chef from Riverhead, NY (eliminated after the appetizer); Nina Singto, Chef and Owner from Nashville, TN (eliminated after the entrée); Emily Ridgway, Research & Development Chef from San Francisco, CA (eliminated after the dessert); Joe Gramaglia, Chef and Owner from Warren, NJ (winner)
595	13	"PB and J"	Maneet Chauhan, Geoffrey Zakarian, and Tiffani Faison	May 25, 2021
Ingredients: Appetizer: peanut butter & jelly hotdogs, peanuts, steak bites, poblano peppers; Entrée: giant peanut butter cup, jelly packets, chicken thighs, bok choy; Dessert: PB&J ice cream sandwiches, basil, raisins on the vine, PB&J moonshine; Contestants: Bo Byrne, Executive Chef from Freeport, ME (eliminated after the appetizer); Rama Ginde, Chef and Owner from Cresskill, NJ (eliminated after the entrée); Grady Kaighn, Chef and Entrepreneur from Raleigh, NC (eliminated after the dessert); Jesse Kuykendall, Executive Chef from San Antonio, TX (winner); Notes: The basket ingredients were inspired by the classic American peanut butter and jelly (PB&J) sandwich.

=== Season 48 (2020–21) ===
No. overall	No. in season	Title	Judges	Original release date
596	1	"Burgers and Bravado"	Geoffrey Zakarian, Maneet Chauhan, and Scott Conant	December 15, 2020
Ingredients: Appetizer: pizza burger, escarole, cipollini onions, pickled beets; Entrée: parsley cake, halibut fillets, purple cauliflower, rösti; Dessert: gin mayonnaise, turquoise candy wafers, cara cara oranges, bitters; Contestants: Ralpheal Abrahante, Executive Chef from New York, NY (eliminated after the appetizer); Ariane Duarte, Chef and Owner from Verona, NJ (eliminated after the entrée); Dana Cohen-Mayer, Corporate Marketing Chef from New York, NY (eliminated after the dessert); Thomas Youell, Executive Chef from New York, NY (winner)
597	2	"Grudge Match: Battle 1"	Michelle Bernstein, Nilou Motamed, and Christian Petroni	January 5, 2021
Ingredients: Appetizer: lemon meringue croissants, black garlic, scallops, grape soda; Entrée: New York strip steaks, piccalilli, Chinese broccoli, tuna-flavored sandwich crackers; Dessert: baked egg ring, pomegranates, shortbread cookies, chaat masala; Contestants: Noam Bilitzer, Executive Chef who competed in 'Beat the Judge: Scott' (eliminated after the appetizer); Jillian Moskites, Chef and Owner who competed in 'Beat the Judge: Marc' (eliminated after the entrée); Justin Turner, Director of Hospitality who competed in 'Beat the Judge: Amanda' (eliminated after the dessert); Tara Khattar, Private Chef and Consultant who competed in 'Beat the Judge: Maneet' (winner); Notes: This is the first part of a five-part champions vs. judges tournament featuring eight chefs and eight Chopped judges, all of whom are past winners. Two chefs and two judges will compete in the finale for the largest prize offered in the show thus far: $100,000, to be donated to "Turn Up! Fight Hunger" if a judge wins. This episode had four chef competitors from "Beat The Judge".
598	3	"Grudge Match: Battle 2"	Michelle Bernstein, Nilou Motamed, and Christian Petroni	January 12, 2021
Ingredients: Appetizer: herring under a fur coat, ham steaks, injera, cucamelons; Entrée: rattlesnake pizza, nopales, beef shank, red curry paste; Dessert: carrot bacon, gala apples, lo mein cake, white chocolate liqueur; Contestants: Amanda Freitag (eliminated after the appetizer); Chris Santos (eliminated after the entrée); Tiffani Faison (eliminated after the dessert); Marcus Samuelsson (winner); Notes: This is the second part of a five-part tournament. This episode featured four Chopped judges from past Beat the Judge episodes as contestants.
599	4	"Grudge Match: Battle 3"	Nilou Motamed, Christian Petroni, and Geoffrey Zakarian	January 19, 2021
Ingredients: Appetizer: sauerkraut soup, breakfast radishes, sardines, pork rind bread crumbs; Entrée: mustard gelatin mold, wild boar, quince, smoked soy sauce; Dessert: unicorn milkshake, raspberries, concha, lap cheong; Contestants: Nick Testa, Executive Chef who competed in 'Beat the Judge: Alex' (eliminated after the appetizer); Jen Biesty, Chef & Owner who competed in 'Beat the Judge: Alex' (eliminated after the entrée); Tristan Epps, Executive Chef who competed in 'Beat the Judge: Amanda' (eliminated after the dessert); Demetrio Zavala, Executive Corporate Chef who competed in 'Beat the Judge: Tiffani' (winner); Notes: This is the third part of a five-part tournament. This episode had four 'Beat the Judge' competitors.
600	5	"Grudge Match: Battle 4"	Nilou Motamed, Christian Petroni, and Geoffrey Zakarian	January 26, 2021
Ingredients: Appetizer: mock turtle soup, chicory, abalone, hootenanny; Entrée: crab rangoon tacos, sablefish, tomato veggie juice, baby corn; Dessert: zen garden, cranberries, confetti cheesecake, black beans; Contestants: Stephen Coe (eliminated after the appetizer); Scott Conant (eliminated after the entrée); Maneet Chauhan (eliminated after the dessert); Marc Murphy (winner); Notes: This is the fourth part of a five-part tournament. This episode featured three Chopped judges from past "Beat the Judge" episodes and the winner of the "Beat Bobby Flay" Chopped tournament. The "hootenanny" dish in Round 1 is a baked dessert similar to a German pancake. The "zen garden" in Round 3 was edible rocks (candy) on sugar "sand".
601	6	"Grudge Match: $100,000 Finale!"	Nilou Motamed, Christian Petroni, and Geoffrey Zakarian	February 2, 2021
Ingredients: Appetizer: cod throats, galangal, crème brûlée, hot chicken (appetizer - Tara Khattar vs. Demetrio Zavala); Entrée: cod throats, galangal, crème brûlée, hot chicken (appetizer - Marc Murphy vs. Marcus Samuelsson); Dessert: loaded nachos, butternut squash, avocado milk, suckling pig (entree - Marc Murphy vs. Demetrio Zavala); Contestants: Tara Khattar (eliminated after the appetizer); Marcus Samuelsson (eliminated after the entrée); Marc Murphy (eliminated after the dessert); Demetrio Zavala (winner); Notes: This is the final part of the champions vs. judges tournament with two appetizer knockout rounds and a final entree round. The chefs competed head to head in the first round and the judges competed head to head in the second round with both rounds featuring the same ingredients; that guaranteed a judge and a champion in the third entree round. A coin toss decided which group chose the order for the first two rounds; the judges won the toss and chose to go second. All rounds lasted 30 minutes. Although the judges losing, a smaller donation was made to Turn Up! Fight Hunger in honor of Chef Marc's performance.
602	7	"Meat Fight: Goat!"	Chris Santos, Amanda Freitag, and Eddie Jackson (chef)	February 9, 2021
Ingredients: Appetizer: goat forequarter, goat sausage, bolo de rolo, shishito peppers; Entrée: leg of goat, goat milk baby formula, turnips, fiery cheese puffs; Dessert: goat salami, goat cheese croquettes, lemon verbena, dragon fruit chips; Contestants: Greg Lipman, Chef and Owner from Atlanta, GA (eliminated after the appetizer); Alain Lemaire, Chef and Co-Owner from Miami, FL (eliminated after the entrée); Deepa Shridhar, Chef from Austin, TX (eliminated after the dessert); Ed Crochet, Chef and Owner from Philadelphia, PA (winner); Notes: This is the first in a series of meat-themed episodes. Goat was the featured protein in every round.
603	8	"Meat Fight: Pork!"	Chris Santos, Amanda Freitag, and Eddie Jackson (chef)	February 16, 2021
Ingredients: Appetizer: barbecue spare ribs, pork butt, Brussels sprouts, Calvados; Entrée: pork belly fried rice, pork tomahawk, pom pom mushrooms, pickled okra; Dessert: guanciale, bacon & potato chip candy bars, muscadine grapes, dehydrated marshmallows; Contestants: Nick Leahy, Chef & Owner from Atlanta, GA (eliminated after the appetizer); Sarah Heard, Co-Chef & Owner from Austin, TX (eliminated after the entrée); Jason Zygmont, Chef & Owner from Nashville, TN (eliminated after the dessert); Denevin Miranda, Chef de Cuisine from New York, NY (winner); Notes: This is the second in a series of meat-themed episodes. Pork was the featured protein in every round.
604	9	"Meat Fight: Beef!"	Chris Santos, Amanda Freitag, and Eddie Jackson (chef)	February 23, 2021
Ingredients: Appetizer: Wagyu tri-tip steak, steak tartare, upland cress, ube ice cream; Entrée: rib roast, bone marrow shots, salsify, blooming onion; Dessert: calf's foot jelly, beef fudge, cape gooseberries, labneh; Contestants: Scott Jones, Chef & Owner from Dallas, TX (eliminated after the appetizer); Billy Ngo, Chef & Owner from Sacramento, CA (eliminated after the entrée); Shorne Benjamin, Private Chef from New York, NY (eliminated after the dessert); Jordan Arcuri, Executive Chef from Nashville, TN (winner); Notes: This is the third in a series of meat-themed episodes. Beef was the featured protein in every round. The tri-tip in the first round was given to the chefs intact. The beef fudge in the third round was chocolate fudge made with beef fat instead of butter.
605	10	"Meat Fight: Bison!"	Chris Santos, Amanda Freitag, and Eddie Jackson (chef)	March 2, 2021
Ingredients: Appetizer: bison short ribs, deviled eggs, fresh wasabi, beer jelly beans; Entrée: bison strip loin, haricots verts, onigiri, cheese tea; Dessert: bison jerky, bison tallow, mincemeat pie, blood oranges; Contestants: Kristine Kittrell, Sous Chef from Austin, TX (eliminated after the appetizer); Desmond Robinson, Chef & Owner from Memphis, TN (eliminated after the entrée); Chetan Shetty, Executive Chef from New York, NY (eliminated after the dessert); Dan Billo, Executive Chef from Boston, MA (winner); Notes: This is the final meat-themed episodes. Bison was the featured protein in every round.
606	11	"Hangry Baskets: Dumped"	Maneet Chauhan, Tiffani Faison, and Chris Santos	March 16, 2021
Ingredients: Appetizer: fettucine alfredo with chicken, red onions, Cabarnet, chocolate; Entrée: vanilla ice cream, yellow snack cakes, beef heart, artichokes; Dessert: divorce cake, cinnamon bun spread, pineapple, dates; Contestants: Malik Ali, Private Chef & Caterer from Philadelphia, PA (eliminated after the appetizer); Michael Morales, Executive Chef from Chicago, IL (eliminated after the entrée); Josh Sutcliff, Executive Chef from Dallas, TX (eliminated after the dessert); Leksi Bunnell, Sous Chef from New York, NY (winner); Notes: This is the first of four episodes featuring what we eat when we're "hangry" (hungry & angry). The baskets in this episode include ingredients that we eat after a heartbreak.
607	12	"Hangry Baskets: Hungover"	Maneet Chauhan, Tiffani Faison, and Chris Santos	March 23, 2021
Ingredients: Appetizer: big burgers, avocados, ramen noodles, mimosa; Entrée: Philly cheesesteak, chicken tenders, pickles, Bloody Mary potato chips; Dessert: eggs benedict, watermelon, soda crackers, coconut water; Contestants: Shaina Juliana, Chef and Owner from Bronx, NY (eliminated after the appetizer); Hux Jones, Executive Chef from Knoxville, TN (eliminated after the entrée); Taylor Hester, Chef de Cuisine from New York, NY (eliminated after the dessert); Joe Cooke, Executive Chef from Boston, MA (winner); Notes: This is the second of four episodes featuring what we eat when we're "hangry". The baskets in this episode had fast food, alcohol-related ingredients, and/or remedies for hangovers. The judges claimed they drank the night before to accurately portray being hungover for the show.
608	13	"Hangry Baskets: Hot & Hangry"	Maneet Chauhan, Tiffani Faison, and Chris Santos	March 30, 2021
Ingredients: Appetizer: ghost peppers, Carolina reaper cheese, pork secreto, grits; Entrée: phaal curry, pineapple habanero shrub, t-bone steak, rainbow chard; Dessert: super spicy jawbreakers, hot sauce, camel milk, guava; Contestants: Caroline Gutierrez, Private Chef from Atlanta, GA (eliminated after the appetizer); Garrett Wheeler, Executive Chef from Atlanta, GA (eliminated after the entrée); Brandon Silva, Executive Chef from Houston, TX (eliminated after the dessert); Tesia Bunton, Chef Consultant from Atlanta, GA (winner); Notes: This is the third of four episodes featuring things we eat when we're "hangry". The baskets in this episode featured hot and spicy ingredients.

=== Season 49 (2020–21) ===
No. overall	No. in season	Title	Judges	Original release date
609	1	"Comfort Food Feud: Bacon"	Maneet Chauhan, Chris Santos, and Tiffani Faison	November 10, 2020
Ingredients: Appetizer: bacon beer cheese, romanesco cauliflower, uncured bacon, yuzu kosho; Entrée: bacon & eggs gelatin shots, sweet corn on the cob, pork belly, biscuit dough; Dessert: pig tails, bacon bananas foster, chocolate chips, avocados; Contestants: Ashley DeSilva, Executive Chef from Brunswick, ME (eliminated after the appetizer); Jessica Kotula, Chef and Charcutier from New York, NY (eliminated after the entrée); Nick Wilson, Chef and Owner from Pembroke, MA (eliminated after the dessert); Christopher Walker, Chef and Butcher from Boston, MA (winner); Notes: This is the first part of a five-part outdoor tournament in Maine, centered around comfort foods. The winner of each episode advanced to the finale for a chance at $25,000. Each episode had a different theme; this one is bacon-related dishes with bacon in every basket. The bacon beer cheese in the first round was beer cheese with cheddar and swiss, in a bacon wrapped beer mug. The gelatin shots in the second round had vodka, caramel, and bacon bits inside with a gummy candy egg on top. A rainstorm interrupted the final round judging, shutting off power and limiting filming of the judge's discussion to vertical phone cameras.
610	2	"Comfort Food Feud: Burgers"	Maneet Chauhan, Chris Santos, and Tiffani Faison	November 17, 2020
Ingredients: Appetizer: deep fried burger, scotch bonnet peppers, peaches, sloppy Joe mix; Entrée: burger in a can, summer squash, short ribs, glazed doughnuts; Dessert: mustard ice cream, green apples, honeycomb, burger cupcakes; Contestants: Johan Jensen, Chef and Owner from Stonington, CT (eliminated after the appetizer); D'Andre Miller, Executive Chef from New York, NY (eliminated after the entrée); Mitzi Jackson-Robinson, Personal Chef from Philadelphia, PA (eliminated after the dessert); Danny Rassi, Chef and Owner from North Conway, NH (winner); Notes: This is the second part of a five-part outdoor tournament. The theme of this episode is burgers, with some form of burgers in every basket. The chefs didn't have to make burgers in every round but they did have to make rich, comforting, burger-inspired dishes. The canned burger in Round 2 was a cheeseburger with ketchup, mayonnaise, and pickles.
611	3	"Comfort Food Feud: Mac and Cheese"	Maneet Chauhan, Chris Santos, and Tiffani Faison	November 24, 2020
Ingredients: Appetizer: mactini, turnips, mini brie bites, corndog sushi; Entrée: mac and quiche, baby spinach, truffle pecorino, pot roast; Dessert: mac and cheese lava cake, figs, honey goat gouda, pancake mix; Contestants: Melissa Chaiken, Chef & Co-Owner from Bangor, ME (eliminated after the appetizer); Jason Whipland, Chef & Owner from Middletown, NY (eliminated after the entrée); Christopher Hensel, Private Chef from New York, NY (eliminated after the dessert); Sarita Ekya, Chef & Owner from New York, NY (winner); Notes: This is the third part of a five-part outdoor tournament. The theme of this episode is macaroni and cheese, with a different type of cheese, in every basket. In the first round, the "mactini" was mac and cheese inside a large martini glass. The corndog sushi was a corndog, but with a smoked salmon roll instead of a hot dog. The lava cake in the third round was a large mac & cheese fritter with a hot cheddar cheese center.
612	4	"Comfort Food Feud: Pizza"	Maneet Chauhan, Chris Santos, and Tiffani Faison	December 1, 2020
Ingredients: Appetizer: chocolate fudge cake, four meat pizza, plumcots, anchovies; Entrée: spaghetti & meatball pizza, watercress, pink pineapple, pork collar; Dessert: cereal pizza, cherries, pepper flakes, burrata cheese; Contestants: Austin Baker, Head Chef from Brooklyn, NY (eliminated after the appetizer); Pietro Mazzella, Chef & Owner from Wayne, NJ (eliminated after the entrée); Steve Welch, Chef & Owner from Cambridge, MA (eliminated after the dessert); Stacy Mokes, Executive Sous Chef from Asbury Park, NJ (winner); Notes: This is the fourth part of a five-part outdoor tournament. The theme of this episode is pizza, both as a basket ingredient and as a dish in each round. The four meat pizza in Round 1 consisted of pepperoni, ham, sausage and bacon. The spaghetti pizza in Round 2 was meatballs, cheese, and sauce on top of a baked spaghetti crust. The cereal pizza in Round 3 was a pizza crust topped with cream cheese icing and colorful cereal.
613	5	"Comfort Food Feud: Finale"	Maneet Chauhan, Chris Santos, and Tiffani Faison	December 8, 2020
Ingredients: Appetizer: pizza pot pie, red sorrel, grape jelly, hot butt cappy; Entrée: mac & cheese stuffed turkey, collard greens, pizza cocktail, wild boar bacon; Dessert: cinnaburger, wild blueberries, mango ketchup, mac & cheese candy canes; Contestants: Stacy Mokes, Executive Sous Chef from Asbury Park, NJ (eliminated after the appetizer); Sarita Ekya, Chef & Owner from New York, NY (eliminated after the entrée); Danny Rassi, Chef and Owner from North Conway, NH (eliminated after the dessert); Christopher Walker, Chef and Butcher from Boston, MA (winner); Notes: This is the final part of a five-part outdoor tournament and each past themed ingredient (pizza, bacon, burger, mac & cheese) was featured in the baskets. The "hot butt cappy" in Round 1 was capicola presented in a long Italian-style sub sandwich. The "pizza cocktail" in Round 2 was a Bloody Mary with tomato and mozzarella garnish. The cinna burger in Round 3 was a quadruple bacon cheeseburger with cinnamon rolls instead of burger buns.
614	6	"Cooked with Care!"	Marc Murphy, Amanda Freitag, and Marcus Samuelsson	March 9, 2021
Ingredients: Appetizer: canned bacon, mahi mahi fillets, kohlrabi, life preserver candies; Entrée: shrimp chips, beef tenderloin, kale, onion juice; Dessert: rambutan, nurse cake pops, cream cheese, strawberry gelatin cups; Contestants: Brandon Burr, Psychiatric Nurse Practitioner from Richmond, VA (eliminated after the appetizer); Rosanna Martinelli, Pediatric ICU Nurse from Brooklyn, NY (eliminated after the entrée); Krissie Scott, Geriatric Care Nurse from Memphis, TN (eliminated after the dessert); Lorraine Wheeler, ICU Nurse from New York, NY (winner); Notes: This episode featured amateur cooks and paid tribute to nurses on the front lines during the COVID-19 pandemic. The nurses were adorned in rare Chopped nurse medical scrubs rather than chef jackets.
615	7	"Hangry Baskets: Late Night"	Geoffrey Zakarian, Tiffani Faison, and Chris Santos	April 6, 2021
Ingredients: Appetizer: frozen pizza, french fries, maitake mushrooms, meatballs; Entrée: bowl of cereal, mac and cheese, arugula, pork belly; Dessert: toaster pastry sandwiches, persimmons, whipped cream, popcorn; Contestants: Keith Batts, Chef & Caterer from Nashville, TN (eliminated after the appetizer); Hilda Ysusi, Executive Chef & Owner from The Woodlands, TX (eliminated after the entrée); Brian Poe, Chef & Owner from Boston, MA (eliminated after the dessert); Jamarr Massey, Corporate Executive Chef from Miami, FL (winner); Notes: This is the last of four episodes featuring things we eat when we're "hangry". The baskets in this episode had typical late night food staples.
616	8	"Martha Rules: Pantry Surprise!"	Martha Stewart, Marcus Samuelsson, and Marc Murphy	April 13, 2021
Ingredients: Appetizer: blueberry pie, tarragon, lobster mushrooms, oysters; Entrée: clam chowder, purple ninja radishes, leg of lamb, finger limes; Dessert: brown bread in a can, dried chamomile, plums, gorgonzola dulce; Contestants: Woldy Reyes, Catering Chef from Brooklyn, NY (eliminated after the appetizer); Brittney Williams, Private Chef from New York, NY (eliminated after the entrée); Kristen Harlach, Executive Chef from Boston, MA (eliminated after the dessert); Eric Marshall, Private Chef from New York, NY (winner); Notes: This is the first of a special five part, outdoor tournament in Maine for $50,000. Unlike past Chopped tournaments, this tournament features various special challenges doled out by Martha Stewart. For this episode, Martha reduced the pantry to a basic 20 ingredients. She swapped out the 20 ingredients in the first two rounds for pastry-based ingredients in the third round.
617	9	"Martha Rules: Tick Tock!"	Martha Stewart, Marcus Samuelsson, and Marc Murphy	April 20, 2021
Ingredients: Appetizer: hasty pudding, garlic chives with blossoms, mussels, whole grain mustard; Entrée: cornish hens, kale, walnuts, lobster roe, "Martharita"; Dessert: potato candy, white nectarines, spruce tips, whipped coffee; Contestants: Emshika Alberini, Chef & Owner from Littleton, NH (eliminated after the appetizer); Paul Garberson, Executive Chef from Philadelphia, PA (eliminated after the entrée); Julie Cutting, Chef & Owner from Portsmouth, NH (eliminated after the dessert); Vladimir Lebrun, Executive Chef from Saugus, MA (winner); Notes: This is the second part of the Martha Rules tournament. In this episode, Martha changed the amount of cook time partway into each round. The appetizer round was reduced to 15 minutes. The entrée round had an extra 5 minutes (35 minutes total) but there was also an extra ingredient in the form of a margarita made by Martha. The dessert round lasted for as long as it took Martha to make a lemon meringue pie (their time ended up being a little over 25 minutes).
618	10	"Martha Rules: Blade and Switch!"	Martha Stewart, Marcus Samuelsson, and Marc Murphy	April 27, 2021
Ingredients: Appetizer: sea urchin, fresno peppers, peanut brittle, kombu; Entrée: lobster rolls, romano beans, veal ribeyes, pickled watermelon rind; Dessert: apple brandy, currants, sauerkraut, artichoke cake; Contestants: John DaSilva, Chef & Owner from Boston, MA (eliminated after the appetizer); Courtnee Futch, Private Chef from New York, NY (eliminated after the entrée); David Israelow, Chef & Owner from New York, NY (eliminated after the dessert); Jennifer Normant, Executive Chef from Newburyport, MA (winner); Notes: This is the third part of the Martha Rules tournament. In this episode, Martha made contestants switch stations in the middle of every round.
619	11	"Martha Rules: Mystery Competitor!"	Martha Stewart, Marcus Samuelsson, and Marc Murphy	May 4, 2021
Ingredients: Appetizer: bittersweet soda, pea tendrils, peekytoe crabmeat, garden party orange cake; Entrée: red snapper dogs, heirloom tomatoes, flounder, pearled black barley; Dessert: matcha terrarium, maple syrup, carrots, salty sweet cream ice cream; Contestants: James Kelly, Executive Chef from Brooklyn, NY (eliminated mid-round 1) & William Lawrence, Executive Private Chef from New York, NY (eliminated after round 1) (eliminated after the appetizer); Anthony Caldwell, Executive Chef & Owner from Boston, MA (eliminated after the entrée); Julie Cutting, Chef & Owner from Portsmouth, NH (introduced in round 3) (eliminated after the dessert); Saba Wahid Duffy, Private Chef from Framingham, MA (winner); Notes: This is the fourth part of the Martha Rules tournament. In this episode, the chefs were told they could be eliminated mid-round. Martha taste-tested components from everyone's stations and eliminated a chef in the middle of Round 1. A chef was also eliminated at the end of the first round. In the third round, Martha brought in a runner-up chef from a previous Martha Rules round.
620	12	"Martha Rules: Grand Finale!"	Martha Stewart, Marcus Samuelsson, and Marc Murphy	May 11, 2021
Ingredients: Appetizer: haddock fillets, pear & cornbread skillet cake, sour beer, gloves (to forage for garden ingredient of their choice); Entrée: lobster bake: lobster, clams, corn, potatoes, kielbasa (at least 3 must be used); Dessert: giant whoopie pie, divergent melon, pork & liver terrine, fresh (cow's) milk; Contestants: Eric Marshall, Private Chef from New York, NY (chopped 1st in entrée) (eliminated after the appetizer); Vladimir Lebrun, Executive Chef from Saugus, MA (chopped 2nd in entrée) (eliminated after the entrée); Jennifer Normant, Executive Chef from Newburyport, MA (eliminated after the dessert); Saba Wahid Duffy, Private Chef from Framingham, MA (winner); Notes: This is the final part of the Martha Rules tournament where the winner receives $50,000. In the first round Martha let each contestant pick a fourth ingredient from Maine's Earth Farm garden (Eric got mustard greens, Vlad got celery, Saba got kale, and Jennifer got lettuce). In the second round, they were directed to a separate table where Martha and the judges presented five cooked ingredients in a lobster bake and the contestants had to use at least three of them in their dish. In the third round, the finalists had to milk cows to get their fresh milk. There was no elimination in Round 1 followed by a double elimination in Round 2.
621	13	"Taco Brawl"	Marc Murphy, Amanda Freitag, and Scott Conant	May 18, 2021
Ingredients: Appetizer: pepinos locos, squash blossoms, pork tenderloin, masa dough; Entrée: taco salad, red snapper, jicama, ancho chiles; Dessert: cheesecake chimichangas, mangos, dried hibiscus flowers, margarita; Contestants: Andrew Savoie, Chef and Owner from Dallas, TX (eliminated after the appetizer); Geronimo Lopez, Chef and Owner from San Antonio, TX (eliminated after the entrée); Chando Madrigal, Executive Chef and Owner from Sacramento, CA (eliminated after the dessert); Kiersten Gormeley, Executive Chef and Owner from New York, NY (winner); Notes: In this episode the chefs had to make tacos in every round.

=== Season 50 (2021–22) ===
Stanimirov also competed on Hell's Kitchen and finished fourth on eleventh season.}

No. overall	No. in season	Title	Judges	Original release date
622	1	"Time Capsule: '60s Foods!"	Marc Murphy, Amanda Freitag, and Marcus Samuelsson	June 1, 2021
Ingredients: Appetizer: 60's themed cookies, meatballs with grape jelly, frozen peas, grapefruit soda; Entrée: wieneroni casserole, button mushrooms, fondue, side of salmon; Dessert: melon balls, tunnel of fudge cake, rocket lollipops, stacked chips; Contestants: Ara Malekian, Chef and Pitmaster from Richmond, TX (eliminated after the appetizer); Chris Valdez, Chef and Owner from Miami, FL (eliminated after the entrée); Margeaux Alcorta, Culinary Director from San Antonio, TX (eliminated after the dessert); Jonathan Beatty, Executive Chef from Atlanta, GA (winner); Notes: This was one of a series of episodes where chefs cooked with foods popular during a given time period. This episode highlighted foods from the 1960s.
623	2	"Time Capsule: '90s Foods!"	Marc Murphy, Amanda Freitag, and Scott Conant	June 8, 2021
Ingredients: Appetizer: lunch kit, sun-dried tomatoes, Chinese chicken salad, appletini; Entrée: pasta in a can, strawberry fruit leather, portobello mushrooms, flank steak; Dessert: mini cookies with frosting, chocolate-covered strawberries, drinkable cereal yogurt, corn dogs; Contestants: Lee Frank, Chef and Owner from Exeter, NH (eliminated after the appetizer); Cyndi Stanimirov, Chef and General Manager from Brooklyn, NY (eliminated after the entrée); Michelle Tribble, Head Chef from Dallas, TX (eliminated after the dessert); Kenyatta Ashford, Chef and Owner from Chattanooga, TN (winner); Notes: This was one of a series of episodes where chefs cooked with foods popular during a given time period; this episode highlighted foods from the 1990s. The lunch kit in the appetizer round contained crackers, mozzarella, and pepperoni. The canned pasta in the entree round was macaroni in a tomato sauce. In addition, Chef Tribble competed twice on Hell's Kitchen, finishing in third place in its fourteenth season, and winning its seventeenth season.
624	3	"Time Capsule: Future Foods!"	Marc Murphy, Amanda Freitag, and Scott Conant	June 15, 2021
Ingredients: Appetizer: sustainable squash, Little Neck clams, algae oil, black ants; Entrée: sunflowers, ostrich fillet, fonio, solar farm honey; Dessert: meatless breakfast sausage, pea protein milk, astronaut peaches, organic cacao powder; Contestants: Rodrigo Ochoa, Executive Chef from Miami, FL (eliminated after the appetizer); Taylor Hurt, Chef from Hattiesburg, MS (eliminated after the entrée); Joe Schafer, Executive Chef from Kennebunkport, ME (eliminated after the dessert); Dan Jackson, Executive Chef from Chapel Hill, NC (winner); Notes: This was one of a series of episodes where chefs cooked with foods popular during a given time period. This episode featured food hypothesized to become popular in the year 3000. The end of this episode had a dedication to Chef Taylor Hurt who passed away in November 2020.
625	4	"Alton's Maniacal Baskets: Part 1"	Alton Brown, Maneet Chauhan, and Marcus Samuelsson	June 22, 2021
Ingredients: Appetizer: bean sprouts, pasture raised eggs, spinach lasagna, chicken in a can; Entrée: blood soup, parsnips, venison osso buco, M.R.E; Dessert: livermush pudding, pickled garlic, Bartlett pears, tawny port; Contestants: Megan Brown, Chef & Owner from Long Island, NY (eliminated after the appetizer); Brianna Cooper, Chef & Owner from Brooklyn, NY (eliminated after the entrée); Diego Fernandez, Executive Chef from Dallas, TX (eliminated after the dessert); Eric Spigner, Executive Chef from Dallas, TX (winner); Notes: This is first part of a five-part tournament where Alton Brown selected an outrageous basket ingredient for each round suggested by viewers on social media. The winner of each heat went on to the finale where they competed for $25,000. The M.R.E. in round 2 was chicken teriyaki.
626	5	"Alton's Maniacal Baskets: Part 2"	Alton Brown, Maneet Chauhan, and Marcus Samuelsson	June 29, 2021
Ingredients: Appetizer: English breakfast, chanterelle mushrooms, raspberry lambic beer, surströmming; Entrée: ground beef apple pie, guinea hen legs, cardoons, salty licorice; Dessert: bagel & lox cake, frozen cherries, mimolette cheese, chitterlings; Contestants: Henry Morgan, Sous Chef from Coral Gables, FL (eliminated after the appetizer); Matt Brown, Executive Chef from Sacramento, CA (eliminated after the entrée); Paras Shah, Executive Chef & Co-Owner from Las Vegas, NV (eliminated after the dessert); Christina Coupet, Corporate Executive Chef from Miami, FL (winner); Notes: This is the second part of a five-part tournament where Alton Brown selected the baskets, including one outrageous ingredient suggested by fans on social media.
627	6	"Alton's Maniacal Baskets: Part 3"	Alton Brown, Maneet Chauhan, and Marcus Samuelsson	July 6, 2021
Ingredients: Appetizer: black radishes, tuna noodle casserole, pickle jelly beans, lutefisk; Entrée: BBQ cottage cheese salad, rack of elk, cauliflower leaves, natto; Dessert: musk stick marshmallow tart, frozen rhubarb, rock candy, black limes; Contestants: Sam Jones, Sous Chef from New York, NY (eliminated after the appetizer); Mohan Kulasinghum, Executive Chef from New York, NY (eliminated after the entrée); Keesha O'Galdez, Chef & Owner from New York, NY (eliminated after the dessert); Leia Gaccione, Executive Chef & Owner from Morristown, NJ (winner); Notes: This is third part of a five-part tournament where Alton Brown selected the basket ingredients, including one outrageous ingredient in each round.
628	7	"Alton's Maniacal Baskets: Part 4"	Alton Brown, Maneet Chauhan, and Marcus Samuelsson	July 13, 2021
Ingredients: Appetizer: blueberry waffles, head-on shrimp, asparagus, canned haggis; Entrée: fermented banana peels, wild boar foreshanks, bitter melon, shiokara; Dessert: pork floss, grapefruit, pizza cookie cake, wormwood liqueur; Contestants: Tim McDiarmid, Chef & Owner from San Antonio, TX (eliminated after the appetizer); Idris Muhammad, Private Chef from Atlanta, GA (eliminated after the entrée); Leilani Baugh, Chef & Owner from Oakland, CA (eliminated after the dessert); Alex Pineda, Executive Chef from Boston, MA (winner); Notes: This is the fourth part of a five-part tournament where Alton Brown selected the basket ingredients, including one outrageous ingredient in each round.
629	8	"Alton's Maniacal Baskets: Finale"	Alton Brown, Maneet Chauhan, and Marcus Samuelsson	July 20, 2021
Ingredients: Appetizer: pickled pig lips, rainbow carrots, gooseneck barnacles, dried yogurt; Entrée: chocolate covered onion, capon, fava beans, roasted lamb head; Dessert: snack cake wedding cake, durian, kale candy canes, vegan ham; Contestants: Alex Pineda, Executive Chef from Boston, MA (eliminated after the appetizer); Eric Spigner, Executive Chef from Dallas, TX (eliminated after the entrée); Leia Gaccione, Executive Chef & Owner from Morristown, NJ (eliminated after the dessert); Christina Coupet, Corporate Executive Chef from Miami, FL (winner); Notes: This is the final part of the Alton Brown tournament. Alton surprised the contestants by doubling the prize money from $25,000 to $50,000.
630	9	"Chef's Best Friend"	Chris Santos, Amanda Freitag, and Sunny Anderson	July 27, 2021
Ingredients: Appetizer: marrow bones, haricot verts, sardines, peanut butter; Entrée: spaghetti and meatballs, chayote squash, New York strip steaks, doggie beer; Dessert: pig ears, bananas, quail eggs, puppy cappuccino; Contestants: Lisa Spychala, Freelance Chef from New York, NY (eliminated after the appetizer); Meaghan Gannon, Private Chef from New York, NY (eliminated after the entrée); Scott Rackliff, Executive Chef from New York, NY (eliminated after the dessert); Brandon Campney, Executive Chef from Morristown, NJ (winner); Notes: This episode featured a dog-related theme, and was produced on a new "summertime" set. The competing chefs were all dog lovers whose dishes included a separate treat, using at least one basket ingredient, for a golden retriever named James. To do so, the chefs were given an extra 10 minutes in each round, and all the baskets had ingredients that were safe for dogs to eat. The "doggie beer" in the second round was bone broth and the "cappuccino" in the third round was just whipped heavy cream.
631	10	"Ballpark Baskets"	Amanda Freitag, Marc Murphy, and Jordan Andino	August 3, 2021
Ingredients: Appetizer: foot-long hot dogs, nacho cheese sauce, soft pretzels, watermelon radishes; Entrée: popcorn, chicken tenders, broccoli rabe, beer pickles; Dessert: caramel apple baseballs, roasted peanuts, strawberries, cotton candy; Contestants: Jen Royle, Executive Chef & Owner from Boston, MA (eliminated after the appetizer); Aristide Williams, Private Chef from New Orleans, LA (eliminated after the entrée); Fanerra Dupree, Chef & Owner from Brooklyn, NY (eliminated after the dessert); Alix Baker, Private Chef from Brooklyn, NY (winner); Notes: The basket ingredients in every round were inspired by baseball park food.
632	11	"Playing with Fire: Wild Things"	Alex Guarnaschelli, Tiffani Faison, and Eduardo Garcia	August 10, 2021
Ingredients: Appetizer: ostrich burgers, stinging nettles, oyster mushrooms, silkworm pupa; Entrée: alligator nuggets, rack of antelope, fiddlehead ferns, blueberry pie filling; Dessert: barbecue boar sliders, cape gooseberries, shredded coconut, goat's milk caramel; Contestants: Justin "JRob" Robinson, Chef & Owner from Atlanta, GA (eliminated after the appetizer); Joseph Quellar, Pit Master & Owner from Houston, TX (eliminated after the entrée); Kimberly Plafke, Production Manager & Chef from Brooklyn, NY (eliminated after the dessert); Larissa Da Costa, Private Chef from Los Angeles, CA (winner); Notes: This is the first part of a five-part grilling tournament with 16 chefs competing for a $25,000 prize. Each episode in the tournament had a theme; the baskets in this episode featured wild game. Unlike past grilling tournaments, this one was held indoors on the new set and the chefs had large, open-fire grills.
633	12	"Playing with Fire: Hog Heaven"	Alex Guarnaschelli, Chris Santos, and Eric Adjepong	August 17, 2021
Ingredients: Appetizer: baby back ribs, daikon, honeycomb, bologna salad; Entrée: pork butt, cabbage, gummy apple candy, pork skin; Dessert: banana muffins, thyme, peaches, bacon beer brittle; Contestants: Shane Nasby (eliminated after the appetizer); Dominique Leach (eliminated after the entrée); Joe Yim (eliminated after the dessert); Zuri Resendiz (winner); Notes: This is second part of a five-part grilling tournament. This episode's baskets featured pork.
634	13	"Playing with Fire: High Stakes"	Alex Guarnaschelli, Tiffani Faison, and Eduardo Garcia	August 24, 2021
Ingredients: Appetizer: smoked watermelon ham, ramps, New York strip steak, butcher cut bacon; Entrée: long bone ribeye, summer truffles, okra, jalapeño popper grilled cheese sandwiches; Dessert: steak sauce, kumquats, chocolate Brussels sprouts, grilled dessert pizza; Contestants: Franco Vlasic, Co-Owner & Pitmaster from New York, NY (eliminated after the appetizer); Stacy Bareng, Chef & Owner from Los Angeles, CA (eliminated after the entrée); Bret Lunsford, Executive Chef from New York, NY (eliminated after the dessert); Nicole Hicks, Chef & Owner from Atlanta, GA (winner); Notes: This is the third part of a five-part grilling tournament. This episode's baskets featured steak and related ingredients.
635	14	"Playing with Fire: Surf and Turf"	Alex Guarnaschelli, Tiffani Faison, and Eric Adjepong	August 31, 2021
Ingredients: Appetizer: scallops, lamb chops, surf & turf sushi rolls, spinach; Entrée: crawfish, bison t-bone steaks, frozen lima beans, cowboy queso; Dessert: chocolate lobster claws, cured beef tongue, grilling butter, figs; Contestants: Aubrey Johansen, Private Chef from Tampa, FL (eliminated after the appetizer); John Hanlon, Executive Chef from Newton, MA (eliminated after the entrée); Samir Mogannam, Chef & Owner from San Francisco, CA (eliminated after the dessert); Annisha Garcia, Chef de Cuisine from New York, NY (winner); Notes: This is the fourth part of a five-part grilling tournament. This episode's baskets featured meat and seafood.
636	15	"Playing with Fire: Finale"	Alex Guarnaschelli, Chris Santos, and Eric Adjepong	September 7, 2021
Ingredients: Appetizer: epic barbecue burger, camel tenderloin, fire roasted poblano peppers, kiwis; Entrée: octopus, dragon's tongue beans, prime rib roast, frozen fruit pops; Dessert: basque burnt cheesecake, chicken fried bacon, flame grapes, corn on the cob; Contestants: Nicole Hicks, Chef & Owner from Atlanta, GA (eliminated after the appetizer); Zuri Resendiz, Executive Sous Chef from Denver, CO (eliminated after the entrée); Larissa Da Costa, Private Chef from Los Angeles, CA (eliminated after the dessert); Annisha Garcia, Chef de Cuisine from New York, NY (winner); Notes: This is the final part of a five-part grilling tournament. Each previous tournament theme was represented in the baskets (wild game, seafood, steak, and pork).
637	16	"Shakes and Fries"	Maneet Chauhan, Scott Conant, and Darnell Ferguson	September 14, 2021
Ingredients: Appetizer: strawberry cheesecake milkshake, frozen french fries, Thai basil, meatloaf mix; Entrée: corn ice cream, russet potatoes, boneless chicken thighs, Cincinnati chili; Dessert: milkshake flavored toaster pastries, sweet potato waffle fries, frozen cherries, cacao nibs; Contestants: Nico Shumpert, Private Chef from Saint Louis, MO (eliminated after the appetizer); Alex Williams, Chef & Owner from Los Angeles, CA (eliminated after the entrée); Jackie Contreras, Sous Chef from Napa, CA (eliminated after the dessert); Emme Collins, Private Chef from Seattle, WA (winner); Notes: This was a themed episode where every basket had milkshake and some kind of french fries.
638	17	"Cooking for Love"	Scott Conant, Marc Murphy, and Maneet Chauhan	February 8, 2022
Ingredients: Appetizer: oysters, artichoke hearts, sparkling rose, crème brûlée; Entrée: sweetheart prime rib steaks, asparagus, truffle burrata, spicy gummy lips candy; Dessert: heart piñata cake, matcha powder, passion fruit, chocolate mousse; Contestants: Sam Scott and Brittney Brown, Private Chefs from Atlanta, GA and Detroit, MI (eliminated after the appetizer); Rachel Snyder and Lee Jackson, Private Chefs from New York, NY and Charlotte, NC (eliminated after the entrée); Brooke Baevsky and Matthew Wasson, Private Chefs from New York, NY and New York, NY (eliminated after the dessert); Camerron Dangerfield and Terence Harvey, Private Chefs from Huntsville, AL and New York, NY (winner); Notes: This was a blind date team competition. Two private chefs were paired up based on their interests and what they were looking for in a romantic partner. They met for the first time on the show and had to work together.
639	18	"Deep-Fried Deliciousness"	Scott Conant, Amanda Freitag, and Millie Peartree	March 22, 2022
Ingredients: Appetizer: red hot mozzarella sticks, shrimp, Romanesco cauliflower, blue cheese flavored soda; Entrée: deep-fried pizza, catfish, kohlrabi, grits; Dessert: deep-fried banana split, blackberries, rainbow marshmallows, puff pastry; Contestants: Jimmy Warren, Chef and Owner from Brooklyn, NY (eliminated after the appetizer); Catore Grant, Private Chef & Caterer from Brooklyn, NY (eliminated after the entrée); Darian Bryan, Private Chef from Buffalo, NY (eliminated after the dessert); Alan Delgado, Chef and Director of R&D from Brooklyn, NY (winner); Notes: The theme of this episode was frying, with at one fried ingredient in each basket.

=== Season 51 (2021–22) ===
No. overall	No. in season	Title	Judges	Original release date
640	1	"Pasta, Pasta, Pasta"	Scott Conant, Amanda Freitag, and Nilou Motamed	December 28, 2021
Ingredients: Appetizer: Sunday gravy, dried porcini mushrooms, arugula, white anchovies; Entrée: basil flavored cotton candy, langoustines, mortadella, garlic bread; Dessert: Italian cookie tray, strawberry liqueur, pears, espresso powder; Contestants: Rony Stark, Chef & Owner from New York, NY (eliminated after the appetizer); Jake Vorono, Chef from Seattle, WA (eliminated after the entrée); Merrin Mae Gray, Chef Consultant from Los Angeles, CA (eliminated after the dessert); Barbara Pollastrini, Executive Chef from Santa Monica, CA (winner); Notes: This was a pasta-themed episode; the chefs made pasta each round.
641	2	"Casino Royale: Battle 1"	Scott Conant, Tiffani Faison, and Christian Petroni	January 4, 2022
Ingredients: Appetizer: caviar parfait, purple spinach, spicy pickle potato chips, smoked rattlesnake; Entrée: cheese ball die, jackfruit, California Cabernet, goat leg; Dessert: cherries jubilee, passion fruit, canned butter, vegan turkey log; Contestants: Monique Burns, Private Chef from Phoenix, AZ (eliminated after the appetizer); Graham Calabria, Chef & Owner from Charleston, SC (eliminated after the entrée); Zane Dearien, Executive Chef from Nashville, TN (eliminated after the dessert); Kaleena Bliss, Executive Chef from Seattle, WA (winner); Notes: This was the first part of a five-part casino-themed tournament where the grand prize was a minimum of $25,000 with a chance to win more. In each round chefs rolled the dice to change one of their basket ingredients for a mystery ingredient under a cloche. Odd numbers were "unlucky" (bad) ingredients and even numbers were "lucky" (good) ingredients. In round 1, Chef Zane rolled dice to swap out his rattlesnake and got duck tongues (odd number). Chef Monique rolled to replace her rattlesnake and she got Japanese eggplant (even number). In round 2, Chef Zane rolled to swap his goat leg for snow peas (even), Chef Kaleena rolled to swap her cheese for saffron (even), and Chef Graham rolled to replace his cheese with gelatin tuna salad (odd). In round 3, Chef Zane rolled to swap his vegan turkey for a century egg.
642	3	"Casino Royale: Battle 2"	Scott Conant, Tiffani Faison, and Christian Petroni	January 11, 2022
Ingredients: Appetizer: cookie dough doughnuts, whole coconuts, cocktail sauce, cod milt; Entrée: cherry wax lips, Chinese okra, bologna breakfast bowl, sea cucumber; Dessert: bottarga, finger limes, ketchup seasoning, fat rascals; Contestants: Jenessa Sneva, Chef & Co-Owner from Seattle, WA (eliminated after the appetizer); Corey Rice, Consulting Chef & Owner from Chicago, IL (eliminated after the entrée); Andrew Foskey, Chef de Cuisine from Ojai, CA (eliminated after the dessert); Grace Goudie, Executive Chef from Arlington Heights, IL (winner); Notes: This was the second part of a five-part casino-themed tournament where each chef had the option to roll the dice to switch out an ingredient. Chef Andrew swapped out his cookie dough doughnut and got canned haggis with lamb (odd number), Chef Grace swapped out her cod milt and got wagyu ribeyes (even number), Chef Corey swapped out his cocktail sauce and got Jonah crab claws (even), and Chef Jenessa swapped out cod milt and got natto (odd). In round two, Chef Grace swapped her cherry wax lips and got fish heads (odd), Chef Andrew swapped his sea cucumber and got alligator ribs (odd), and Chef Corey swapped his breakfast bowl and got bitter melon (odd). In round three, Chef Grace swapped her bottarga and got pear brandy, and Chef Andrew swapped his ketchup seasoning and got whacky flavored jelly beans (odd).
643	4	"Casino Royale: Battle 3"	Chris Santos, Tiffani Faison, and Christian Petroni	January 18, 2022
Ingredients: Appetizer: champagne gummy bears, radishes, creamed sliced beef, pork bung; Entrée: truffle honey, artichokes, monkfish, spaghetti-ring deviled eggs; Dessert: baked Alaska, longan fruit, grenadine, sweet relish; Contestants: Raquel Ervin, Executive Chef from Birmingham, AL (eliminated after the appetizer); Nick Dugan, Executive Chef from Las Vegas, NV (eliminated after the entrée); Tajahi Cooke, Chef & Owner from Denver, CO (eliminated after the dessert); Zoe Schor, Chef & Owner from Chicago, IL (winner); Notes: This was part three of a five-part casino-themed tournament. In round 1 all the chefs rolled dice to swap their pork bung: Chef Zoe got chili dogs (odd number). Chef Nick got kohlrabi (even number), Chef Tajahi got pork brains in gravy (odd), and Chef Raquel got black garlic (even). In round two, Chef Zoe rolled to swap her spaghetti ring eggs for broccoli rabe (even). Chef Nick cut himself in the middle of the second round. In round three, both chefs rolled to swap their relish. Chef Tajahi got tomato soup (odd), and Chef Zoe got chocolate-covered strawberries (even)
644	5	"Casino Royale: Battle 4"	Chris Santos, Amanda Freitag, and Christian Petroni	January 25, 2022
Ingredients: Appetizer: smoked salmon pizza, escarole, purple sweet potato noodles, dried octopus; Entrée: slot machine candies, sea beans, ambrosia salad, beef shank; Dessert: cotton candy burrito, red bananas, popcorn kernels, tuna jerky; Contestants: Ross Pineda, Sous Chef from Queens, NY (eliminated after the appetizer); Nicholas Ugliarolo, Executive Chef from Philadelphia, PA (eliminated after the entrée); Tiffani Ortiz, Chef & Owner from Los Angeles, CA (eliminated after the dessert); Nichole Armstead, Executive Chef from Charlotte, NC (winner); Notes: This was part four of a five-part casino-themed tournament. In round one, Chef Tiffani rolled to swap her purple noodles and she got Iberico ham (even number). In round two, Chef Nichole and Chef Nicholas rolled to swap their ambrosia salad. Nichole got sake (even), while Nicholas got sweet breads (odd). Also, Chef Tiffani rolled to swap her slot machine candy and got colatura di alici (even). In round three, Chef Nichole rolled to swap her tuna jerky and got whiskey truffles (even), while Chef Tiffani swapped her candy burrito and got blood pancakes (odd). With Nichole's victory, this marks the first Chopped tournament to have a woman win every preliminary round, thus ensuring an all-female tournament finale.
645	6	"Casino Royale: Finale"	Amanda Freitag, Tiffani Faison, and Christian Petroni	February 1, 2022
Ingredients: Appetizer: freeze dried green peppers, chirashi, head cheese, peach vodka; Entrée: vegan lobster, fuzzy squash, rack of lamb, camel milk cheese; Dessert: chocolate casino chips, guava, pickled pork skin, habanero hot sauce; Contestants: Nichole Armstead, Executive Chef from Charlotte, NC (eliminated after the appetizer); Grace Goudie, Executive Chef from Arlington Heights, IL (eliminated after the entrée); Zoe Schor, Chef & Owner from Chicago, IL (eliminated after the dessert); Kaleena Bliss, Executive Chef from Seattle, WA (winner); Notes: This is the final part of a five-part casino-themed tournament. In each round, the chefs rolled the dice to add to or subtract from the grand prize. The numbers rolled would be multiplied by a thousand with even numbers (between $2,000 and $12,000) adding to the jackpot and odd numbers ($3,000 to $11,000) subtracted from the pot. In round one, Chef Zoe rolled dice to swap out her chirashi and got spicy chicken spread (odd number). Chef Nichole rolled to replace her vodka and she got durian fruit (odd). In round two, Chef Zoe rolled to swap her camel cheese and got blood oranges (even number). Chef Grace rolled to swap her vegan lobster and got mushroom ravioli (even). In round three, both chefs opted to swap their pickled pork skins. Chef Zoe got yeast extract spread (odd) and Chef Kaleena got cape gooseberries (even). The final prize amount was $40,000.
646	7	"Black History Month Celebration"	Kwame Onwuachi, Tiffany Derry, and Justin Sutherland	February 15, 2022
Ingredients: Appetizer: catfish fillets, turnips, Gullah red rice, fresh fish peppers; Entrée: potlikker soup, pork chops, okra, millet; Dessert: smoked ham hocks, sorghum molasses, frozen peaches, canned black-eyed peas; Contestants: Jasmin Andrews, Executive Chef from Orlando, FL (eliminated after the appetizer); Michael Woods, Executive Chef & Owner from Oakland, CA (eliminated after the entrée); Lisa Brooks, Executive Chef from Charlotte, NC (eliminated after the dessert); Brian Jupiter, Executive Chef & Owner from New Orleans, LA (winner); Notes: To recognize Black History Month, the competitors and panel of guest judges were all Black. The basket ingredients represented Black culinary staples.
647	8	"Chocolate Frenzy"	Amanda Freitag, Tiffani Faison, and Claudia Sandoval	February 22, 2022
Ingredients: Appetizer: chocolate candy bar milk, fair trade chocolate truffles, duck breasts, chayote squash; Entrée: white chocolate deviled eggs, ruby chocolate, rump roast, rainbow carrots; Dessert: dark chocolate body paint, double dark chocolate cookies, Greek yogurt, rhubarb; Contestants: Laura Gillway, Pastry Sous Chef from Nashville, TN (eliminated after the appetizer); Candice Custodio, Freelance Chef from Los Angeles, CA (eliminated after the entrée); Lawrence Smith, Co-Owner and Chef from Phoenix, AZ (eliminated after the dessert); Anthony Jones, Executive Sous Chef from Miami, FL (winner); Notes: The theme of this episode was chocolate in every round. Chef Anthony works under regular Chopped judge Marcus Samuelsson.
648	9	"Greater Gator"	Chris Santos, Maneet Chauhan, and Antonia Lofaso	March 1, 2022
Ingredients: Appetizer: alligator tenderloin, edamame, carbonated candy, chocolate bone broth; Entrée: frog legs, Chinese broccoli, churchkhela, matcha waffles; Dessert: fruit cereal, pine cone bud syrup, lemons, mushroom flavored candy canes; Contestants: Halee Raff, Chef & Owner from Chicago, IL (eliminated after the appetizer); Joshua Kihm, Executive Sous Chef from San Diego, CA (eliminated after the entrée); Sterling Buckley, Executive Chef from Las Vegas, NV (eliminated after the dessert); Kayla Robison, Executive Chef from Cincinnati, OH (winner); Notes: This was Chef Antonia Lofaso's first episode as a judge on Chopped.
649	10	"Meal of Fortune"	Geoffrey Zakarian, Maneet Chauhan, and Brooke Williamson	March 8, 2022
Ingredients: Appetizer: seafood tower, bubble blossoms, saffron water, caviar potato chips; Entrée: gold wrapped sushi, lacy cauliflower, torta del casar, rack of Berkshire pork; Dessert: diamond fruitcake, bayberries, ruby chocolate martini, squid ink; Contestants: Daniela Guerra Bowman, Sous Chef from Miami, FL (eliminated after the appetizer); Luke Rogers, Executive Chef from Dallas, TX (eliminated after the entrée); Karl Gorline, Chef de Cuisine from Jackson, MS (eliminated after the dessert); Chris Dodson, Sous Chef from Chicago, IL (winner); Notes: The theme of this episode was expensive, unusual ingredients in every basket.
650	11	"Takeout Takedown"	Chris Santos, Amanda Freitag, and Antonia Lofaso	March 15, 2022
Ingredients: Appetizer: Detroit style pizza, broccoli rabe, ground turkey, roasted bone marrow & shallot jam; Entrée: kung pao chicken, Brussels sprouts, whole branzino, negroni to-go; Dessert: donut tower, oranges, baked apple pie, crème brûlée bubble tea; Contestants: Kyndra McCrary, Chef and Owner from Burbank, CA (eliminated after the appetizer); Dylan Temple, Executive Chef from Duluth, GA (eliminated after the entrée); Joseph Fontelera, Chef and Owner from Chicago, IL (eliminated after the dessert); Donna Lee, Chef and Owner from Chicago, IL (winner); Notes: Every basket in this episode featured at least one restaurant takeout dish.
651	12	"In the Fans' Hands"	Scott Conant, Nilou Motamed, and Marc Murphy	March 29, 2022
Ingredients: Appetizer: chicken alfredo in a can, rainbow chard, shredded coconut, stomach sandwich; Entrée: bison spleen, flat cabbage, hot chicken pizza, gummy noodles; Dessert: asparagus bundt cake, dragon fruit, dirt soda, tie-dye chocolate; Contestants: Salimah Abdul-Hakim, Executive Chef from Cincinnati, OH (eliminated after the appetizer); Jeremy Pyrzynski, Executive Chef from Berwyn, IL (eliminated after the entrée); Justin Groom, Private Chef from Seattle, WA (eliminated after the dessert); Adrianna Siller, Freelance Chef from Tampa, FL (winner); Notes: This was a viewers' choice episode. The basket ingredients were chosen by fans across social media and there was a short video in each round from Chopped fans explaining why they chose an unusual ingredient.
652	13	"Epic BLT Battle"	Marc Murphy, Justin Sutherland, and Brooke Williamson	April 5, 2022
Ingredients: Appetizer: BLT mac & cheese, colossal cut bacon, bibb lettuce, tomato jam; Entrée: pork belly, lettuce bouquet, tomato vodka, beets; Dessert: bacon grease, lettuce flavored ice cream, roasted tomatoes, strawberry milk powder; Contestants: Ben Crookston, Executive Chef from Seattle, WA (eliminated after the appetizer); Cole Dunlap, Chef and Owner from Chicago, IL (eliminated after the entrée); Lindsey Magee, Chef and Owner from Phoenix, AZ (eliminated after the dessert); Tam Patterson, Chef and Owner from Memphis, TN (winner); Notes: The theme of this episode was BLT inspired dishes and every basket featuring versions of bacon, lettuce, and tomatoes.

=== Season 52 (2022) ===
No. overall	No. in season	Title	Judges	Original release date
653	1	"Pie in the Sky"	Geoffrey Zakarian, Maneet Chauhan, and Stephanie Izard	April 12, 2022
Ingredients: Appetizer: blackberry pie, rotisserie chicken, caper berries, chili lime seasoning; Entrée: bratwurst pie, thin-sliced steak, bitter melon, gazpacho; Dessert: pie bites, rambutan, fish-shaped pretzels, mayhaw jelly; Contestants: Nikita "Nik" Sanches, Chef and Owner from Detroit, MI (eliminated after the appetizer); Carter Hach, Executive Chef from Nashville, TN (eliminated after the entrée); Esther Stilwell, Chef and Owner from New York, NY (eliminated after the dessert); Mai Giffard, Chef from Chicago, IL (winner); Notes: The theme of this episode was pie, with some form of pie in every basket. Each round, the chefs were required to make a type of pie.
654	2	"Pickled Tricks"	Maneet Chauhan, Tiffany Derry, and Stephanie Izard	April 19, 2022
Ingredients: Appetizer: coconut vinegar, red snapper fillets, mangos, pickle ice cream; Entrée: pickle brine, chicken thighs, rainbow cauliflower, pickled turnips; Dessert: pickled bologna, grapes, sugar cookie dough, pickled sakura blossoms; Contestants: Sebastian Vargo, Chef and Owner from Chicago, IL (eliminated after the appetizer); Bert Sheffield, Executive Chef from Nashville, NC (eliminated after the entrée); Mahogany Williams, Chef and Owner from Seattle, WA (eliminated after the dessert); Nicco Muratore, Executive Chef from Boston, MA (winner); Notes: This episode required the chefs to pickle something in every round. Each basket contained at least one pickled/brined ingredient.
655	3	"Deli Duel"	Chris Santos, Antonia Lofaso, and Kwame Onwuachi	April 26, 2022
Ingredients: Appetizer: bagel & lox platter, roast beef, avocados, honey mustard dressing; Entrée: loaded baked potato, turkey breast, spinach, cream soda; Dessert: special ice cream sandwich, ham, raspberries, sauerkraut; Contestants: Rebecca King, Chef and Owner from Los Angeles, CA (eliminated after the appetizer); Adrian Castro, Chef de Cuisine from Los Angeles, CA (eliminated after the entrée); Tyler Houston, Chef de Cuisine from Chicago, IL (eliminated after the dessert); Ursula Siker, Chef and Owner from Chicago, IL (winner); Notes: This episode featured delicatessen chefs with deli-centered ingredients in every basket.
656	4	"Taco Throwdown"	Tiffani Faison, Amanda Freitag, and Claudia Sandoval	May 3, 2022
Ingredients: Appetizer: carne asada fries, rock shrimp, red cabbage, tepache; Entrée: agave worms, flank steak, zucchini, baby corn elote; Dessert: horchata ice cream sandwiches, cobanero peppers, black beans, Mexican chocolate; Contestants: Alex Astranti, Executive Chef from Dallas, TX (eliminated after the appetizer); Oscar Samayoa, Chef and Owner from Chicago, IL (eliminated after the entrée); Christina Currier, Executive Sous Chef from Austin, TX (eliminated after the dessert); Josh Kagenski, Sous Chef from Austin, TX (winner); Notes: This was a themed episode that required chefs to make tacos in every round. Baskets included taco-related ingredients.
657	5	"Sexy Feast"	Amanda Freitag, Tiffani Faison, and Eric Adjepong	May 10, 2022
Ingredients: Appetizer: oysters, eggplants, gnudi, charcuterie board; Entrée: heart-shaped pizza, figs, wild boar tenderloin, conch; Dessert: rose petal pie, ginger, papaya, salted caramel; Contestants: Arturo Avallone, Private Chef from Los Angeles, CA (eliminated after the appetizer); Taylur Davis, Chef and Owner from Atlanta, GA (eliminated after the entrée); Kevin Ruiz, Executive Chef from Raleigh, NC (eliminated after the dessert); Simona Lauren, Private Chef from Scottsdale, AZ (winner); Notes: The theme of this episode was "sexy dishes" made from basket ingredients considered to be aphrodisiacs.
658	6	"Pride and Pea Tendrils"	Marc Murphy, Brooke Williamson, and Justin Sutherland	May 17, 2022
Ingredients: Appetizer: changua, pheasant sausage, pea tendrils, mac & cheese powder; Entrée: smorgastarta, crispy onion chips, corn on the cob, bergamot liqueur; Dessert: pig tails, maraschino cherries, long peppers, pistachio cream; Contestants: Mykie Moll, Executive Chef from Washington D.C. (eliminated after the appetizer); Charles Withers, Chef and Owner from Cape Cod, MA (eliminated after the entrée); Kaitlyn Smith, Sous Chef from Los Angeles, CA (eliminated after the dessert); Jhonny Reyes, Chef and Owner from Seattle, WA (winner)
659	7	"Chuck Wagon Cook-Off"	Amanda Freitag, Chris Santos, and Maneet Chauhan	May 24, 2022
Ingredients: Appetizer: chuck wagon chili, tri-colored bell peppers, tri-tip, Tennessee whiskey; Entrée: canned vegetarian steak, portobello mushrooms, pork shoulder, cowboy caviar; Dessert: cherry pudge pie, prickly pear, biscuit dough, jalapeño peanut brittle; Contestants: Melissa Guerra, Food Historian from Rio Grande Valley, TX (eliminated after the appetizer); Jack Matusek, Chef and Butcher from Yoakum, TX (eliminated after the entrée); Courtney Kattner, Chuck Wagon Cook from Petersburg, TX (eliminated after the dessert); Jason Blackwell, Private Chef from Dallas, TX (winner); Notes: Four Texas chefs competed in this episode with cowboy-inspired ingredients.
660	8	"Desperately Seeking Sous-Chef: Battle 1"	Scott Conant, Maneet Chauhan, and Chris Santos	May 31, 2022
Ingredients: Appetizer: pink pineapple, taiyaki, habanero peppers in oil, plant-based chicken; Entrée: chicken feet, lamb shanks, broccoli rabe, bagel bombs; Dessert: caponata, blood oranges, artisanal goat cheese, galaxy gelatin cake; Contestants: Jayden Canady, Sous Chef from Orlando, FL (eliminated after the appetizer); Charlotte De Bleecker, Line Cook from Cupertino, CA (eliminated after the entrée); Cat White, Sous Chef from St. Paul, MN (eliminated after the dessert); Reuben Dhanawade, Sous Chef from Newark, DE (winner); Notes: This was part one of a five-part tournament in which chefs competed for an opportunity to work for Chopped judges Maneet, Chris, or Scott. Throughout the tournament, the chefs were judged on their kitchen skills and work ethic in addition to the usual criteria of presentation, taste, and creativity. Additionally, each set of ingredients in the tournament was chosen by a judge; for this part, Chris chose the appetizer basket, Maneet chose the entree basket, and Scott chose the dessert basket. Chef Jayden displayed hazardous behavior in the appetizer round by working in a frenzy. This resulted in his elimination as the judges felt his behavior was too dangerous, especially in the regular Chopped kitchen.
661	9	"Desperately Seeking Sous-Chef: Battle 2"	Scott Conant, Maneet Chauhan, and Chris Santos	June 7, 2022
Ingredients: Appetizer: chilaquiles, watercress, skirt steak, rice cereal treats; Entrée: aloo toast sandwiches, oca, whole chickens, ground bean sauce; Dessert: gianduja, bananas, licorice, duck prosciutto; Contestants: Beau LeMarbre, Sous Chef from Virginia Beach, VA (eliminated after the appetizer); Shine Ou Yang, Sous Chef from Taichung, Taiwan (eliminated after the entrée); Loic Sany, Chef de Cuisine from Washington, D.C. (eliminated after the dessert); Mat Espiritu, Sous Chef from Santa Monica, CA (winner); Notes: This was part two of a five-part tournament in which chefs competed for an opportunity to work for Chopped judges Maneet, Chris, or Scott. For this part, Chris chose the appetizer basket, Maneet chose the entree basket, and Scott chose the dessert basket.
662	10	"Desperately Seeking Sous-Chef: Battle 3"	Scott Conant, Maneet Chauhan, and Chris Santos	June 14, 2022
Ingredients: Appetizer: araucana eggs, green romano beans, pink snack cakes, goat brains; Entrée: gyro poutine, velvet oyster mushrooms, deckle of beef, Calabrian chiles; Dessert: deep-fried champagne, lychees, purple sweet potato vinegar, chickpea flour; Contestants: Aubrey Allen, Sous Chef from Chicago, IL (eliminated after the appetizer); DeAndre Smith, Private Chef from Denver, CO (eliminated after the entrée); Alex Herman, Sous Chef from St. Louis, MO (eliminated after the dessert); Francisco "Paco" Moran, Sous Chef from Los Angeles, CA (winner); Notes: This was part three of a five-part tournament in which chefs competed for an opportunity to work for Chopped judges Maneet, Chris, or Scott. For this part, Maneet chose the appetizer basket, Scott chose the entree basket, and Chris chose the dessert basket.
663	11	"Desperately Seeking Sous-Chef: Battle 4"	Scott Conant, Maneet Chauhan, and Chris Santos	June 21, 2022
Ingredients: Appetizer: octopus, Buddha's hand, frozen hash browns, duck fat caramels; Entrée: Korean hotdogs, pears, cherry cola, tilefish; Dessert: rosewater syrup, dragon fruit, candied fruit slices, camel jerky; Contestants: Michael Sabatino, Sous Chef from New York, NY (eliminated after the appetizer); Angel Ortega, Junior Sous Chef from San Diego, CA (eliminated after the entrée); Kevin Cardenas, Chef from Brooklyn, NY (eliminated after the dessert); Lauren Windham, Lead Line Cook from Atlanta, GA (winner); Notes: This was part four of a five-part tournament in which chefs competed for an opportunity to work for Chopped judges Maneet, Chris, or Scott. For this part, Scott chose the appetizer basket, Chris chose the entree basket, and Maneet chose the dessert basket.
664	12	"Desperately Seeking Sous-Chef: Finale"	Scott Conant, Maneet Chauhan, and Chris Santos	June 28, 2022
Ingredients: Appetizer: street corn ravioli, baby bok choy, monkfish liver, yuzu kosho; Entrée: 'o pere 'o musso, green chickpeas, pork crown roast, chunky peanut butter; Dessert: Indian burfi, jackfruit, hot chicken ice cream sandwich, feni; Contestants: Lauren Windham, Lead Line Cook from Atlanta, GA (eliminated after the appetizer); Reuben Dhanawade, Sous Chef from Newark, DE (eliminated after the entrée); Mat Espiritu, Sous Chef from Santa Monica, CA (eliminated after the dessert); Francisco "Paco" Moran, Sous Chef from Los Angeles, CA (winner); Notes: This was part five of a five-part tournament in which chefs competed for an opportunity to work for Chopped judges Maneet, Chris, or Scott. For the finale, Chris chose the appetizer basket, Scott chose the entree basket, and Maneet chose the dessert basket. The winner, Chef Moran, opted to become a sous chef for Scott at his restaurant in Scottsdale, Arizona.
665	13	"Tiny But Mighty"	Marc Murphy, Amanda Freitag, and Justin Sutherland	October 25, 2022
Ingredients: Appetizer: littleneck clams, pineapple tomatillos, cocktail franks, mini pancake stack; Entrée: mini fried pickles, Cornish hens, baby eggplant, tiny ketchup bottles; Dessert: burger cookies, baby zucchini, chokeberries, tiny spiked horchata; Contestants: Jonathan Shuler, Executive Chef (eliminated after the appetizer); Josue Pena, Executive Chef from Miami, FL (eliminated after the entrée); Alex Gregoire, Executive Chef from Brittany, France, and Las Vegas, NV (eliminated after the dessert); Olivia "Liv" Hurst, Executive Chef from Atlanta, GA (winner); Notes: The theme of this episode was using tiny ingredients to create dishes that have big flavors.

=== Season 53 (2022–23) ===
No. overall	No. in season	Title	Judges	Original release date
666	1	"Grilling on the Edge"	Marc Murphy, Tiffani Faison, and Cliff Crooks	October 18, 2022
Ingredients: Appetizer: top sirloin cap, smoked old-fashioned, poblano peppers, grilled peach toast; Entrée: BBQ sundae, boneless whole pork loin, broccoli steaks, honey butter corn ribs; Dessert: gummy watermelon, star fruit, toffee chips, empanada dough; Contestants: Molly Behnke, Private Chef from Portland, OR (eliminated after the appetizer); Danny Gordon, Chef & Owner from Los Angeles, CA (eliminated after the entrée); Mateo Mackbee, Chef & Owner from New Orleans, LA (eliminated after the dessert); Roberto Centeno, Executive Chef from Phoenix, AZ (winner); Notes: The theme of this episode was grilling. Unlike most grilling episodes, the chefs were allowed to use the ovens. The BBQ sundae in the second round was layers of couscous, mashed potatoes, baked beans, coleslaw, and BBQ sauce in a mason jar that were made to look like an ice cream sundae.
667	2	"Social Showdown"	Geoffrey Zakarian, Maneet Chauhan, and Joe Sasto	November 1, 2022
Ingredients: Appetizer: baked feta, mussels, micro mizuna, raindrop cake; Entrée: rainbow brownies, lamb loin, beet hummus, fifteen-hour potatoes; Dessert: cotton candy cake, nature's cereal, bergamot, croissant doughnuts; Contestants: Alix Traeger (eliminated after the appetizer); Tway Da Bae (eliminated after the entrée); H. Woo Lee (eliminated after the dessert); Ahmad Alzahabi (winner); Notes: Four young home cooks with large social media followings on Twitter, TikTok, and Instagram compete. Each basket also had at least one ingredient that originated as a social media trend. They were given 30 minutes in the appetizer round instead of the usual 20.
668	3	"More Cheese, Please!"	Geoffrey Zakarian, Amanda Freitag, and Millie Peartree	November 8, 2022
Ingredients: Appetizer: cheese sushi, spinach, king crab legs, asiago cheese; Entrée: pizza burrito, beech mushrooms, rose veal chops, Taleggio; Dessert: cheese cracker crunch cake, grapes, sour cherry spread, honey goat Gouda; Contestants: Jasmine Norton, Chef and Co-Owner from Baltimore, MD (eliminated after the appetizer); Jessica "Jess" Ngo, Sous Chef from Los Angeles, CA (eliminated after the entrée); Patrick Costa, Executive Chef and Owner from Los Angeles, CA (eliminated after the dessert); Anthony Denning, Chef and Owner from Charlotte, NC (winner); Notes: The theme of this episode was cheese in every mystery basket. A variety of cheeses was also included in the pantry.
669	4	"Thankful for Teachers!"	Tiffani Faison, Cliff Crooks, and Maneet Chauhan	November 15, 2022
Ingredients: Appetizer: deep-fried turducken, purple potatoes, ground turkey, pumpkin cheese ball; Entrée: sourdough bread turkey, turkey tenderloin, Brussels sprouts, maple pumpkin butter; Dessert: pie cake, pomegranates, pecans, candy corn punch; Contestants: Joshua Martin, Math Teacher from Houston, TX (eliminated after the appetizer); Ryan Gholson, Music Teacher from Baltimore, MD (eliminated after the entrée); Jessica Snyder, Math Teacher from Brooklyn, NY (eliminated after the dessert); Kathleen Cluchey, History & Science Teacher from Fort Worth, TX (winner); Notes: This episode was a Thanksgiving-themed episode featuring four home cooks who were also teachers. They are given 30 minutes in the appetizer round instead of the usual 20.
670	5	"Buzzworthy Bizarre Baskets"	Geoffrey Zakarian, Maneet Chauhan, and Joe Sasto	November 22, 2022
Ingredients: Appetizer: pork uterus, pork and seaweed doughnuts, purple yams, cumin soda; Entrée: rooster testicle stew, beef kidney, cardoons, fried egg cake; Dessert: cricket milkshake, horned melon, green pepper jelly, dragon beard candy; Contestants: Sarah Cloyd, Executive Chef (eliminated after the appetizer); Travis Peters, Chef & Owner from Tucson, AZ (eliminated after the entrée); Charleston Yang, Sous Chef (eliminated after the dessert); Nikko Cagalanan, Chef & Owner (winner); Notes: The baskets featured "bizarre" ingredients.
671	6	"Gargantuan Surprises"	Geoffrey Zakarian, Amanda Freitag, and Millie Peartree	November 29, 2022
Ingredients: Appetizer: whole oxtail, giant moscow mule, long beans, nacho tower; Entrée: bison rib roast, dinosaur kale, giant can of potato chips, bowl of spaghetti and meatballs; Dessert: giant gummy snake, mega chocolate cookie bar, long stem strawberries, ice cream sundae; Contestants: Dana McCloskey, Chef (eliminated after the appetizer); Chase Davis, Chef & Owner (eliminated after the entrée); Naya Wantee, Private Chef & Caterer (eliminated after the dessert); Max Robbins, Executive Chef (winner); Notes: Each basket had oversized ingredients, including one ingredient that, due to its size, was both placed under a separate cover in the pantry and had to be shared among the chefs. In line with the theme, the chefs also had to include big flavors in their dishes.
672	7	"Grandmas' Grand Holiday"	Marc Murphy, Amanda Freitag, and Justin Sutherland	December 6, 2022
Ingredients: Appetizer: Christmas cupcake wreath, glazed ham, pomelos, potato latkes; Entrée: fruitcake, beef tenderloin, beets, eggnog; Dessert: marshmallows, spritz cookies, cranberries, creamed honey; Contestants: Hayko Pattison (eliminated after the appetizer); Barbara Mitchell-Peten (eliminated after the entrée); Lisa Thompson (eliminated after the dessert); Merry Graham (winner); Notes: This episode featured four grandmothers as contestants. They are given 30 minutes in the appetizer round instead of the usual 20.
673	8	"Gluten for Punishment"	Marc Murphy, Tiffani Faison, and Cliff Crooks	February 28, 2023
Ingredients: Appetizer: fried gluten with peanuts, scallops, leeks, chai tea latte; Entrée: beef stroganoff tacos, winter truffles, Bloody Mary olives, ostrich fan fillet; Dessert: yeast extract spread, pink variegated lemons, heavy cream, blueberry pancake pie; Contestants: Chantiel Melson (eliminated after the appetizer); Kevin Green (eliminated after the entrée); Dan Kardos (eliminated after the dessert); Mamba Hamissi (winner)
674	9	"All-American Showdown: West"	Geoffrey Zakarian, Alex Guarnaschelli, and Gregory Gourdet	July 11, 2023
Ingredients: Appetizer: pho, ahi tuna, snow peas, hatch chiles; Entrée: mission-style burritos, tri-tip, celery root, green goddess dressing; Dessert: dragon’s breath, nopales, doughnut dough, brute rose; Contestants: Sara Hauman (eliminated after the appetizer); Min Kim (eliminated after the entrée); Rashida Holmes (eliminated after the dessert); Hosea Rosenberg (winner)
675	10	"All-American Showdown: North"	Scott Conant, Alex Guarnaschelli, and Eric Adjepong	July 18, 2023
Ingredients: Appetizer: kringle, lake perch, corn on the cob, salted egg yolk paste; Entrée: deep dish pizza, goat shoulder, Idaho potatoes, Greek dressing; Dessert: root beer float, frozen cherries, pita chips, buckeyes; Contestants: Karyn Tomlinson (eliminated after the appetizer); Andy Schumacher (eliminated after the entrée); Jill Vedaa (eliminated after the dessert); Omar Anani (winner)
676	11	"All-American Showdown: South"	Geoffrey Zakarian, Alex Guarnaschelli, and Gregory Gourdet	July 25, 2023
Ingredients: Appetizer: pimento cheese quick bread, salty fingers, red eye gravy, gulf shrimp; Entrée: chicken & waffles, swamp cabbage, minute steak, moonshine-soaked pickles; Dessert: whiskey & cola sheet cake, sliced peaches, sour candy balls, mayonnaise; Contestants: Javier Becerra (eliminated after the appetizer); Scotley Innis (eliminated after the entrée); Austin Sumrall (eliminated after the dessert); Sara Bradley (winner); Notes: Chef Innis had previously competed on the eighteenth season of Hell's Kitchen. He was eliminated in ninth place.
677	12	"All-American Showdown: East"	Scott Conant, Alex Guarnaschelli, and Cassidee Dabney	August 1, 2023
Ingredients: Appetizer: Pennsylvania pot roast, escarole, everything bagel dip, Manhattan; Entrée: live lobster, New England clam chowder, graffiti eggplant, horseradish; Dessert: Boston cream pie, blueberries, scrapple, coffee syrup; Contestants: Lee Chizmar (eliminated after the appetizer); Elijah Milligan (eliminated after the entrée); Shenarri Freeman (eliminated after the dessert); Pepe Moncayo (winner)
678	13	"All-American Showdown: Finale"	Scott Conant, Alex Guarnaschelli, and Amanda Freitag	August 8, 2023
Ingredients: Appetizer: mile high apple pie, okra, lamb tongue, tamales; Entrée: Chicago dogs, red snapper, lacy cauliflower, maple syrup; Dessert: sea urchin, bananas, sweet tea, french fry sundae; Contestants: Pepe Moncayo (eliminated after the appetizer); Omar Anani (eliminated after the entrée); Hosea Rosenberg (eliminated after the dessert); Sara Bradley (winner)

=== Season 54 (2022–23) ===
No. overall	No. in season	Title	Judges	Original release date
679	1	"Noodle-palooza"	Scott Conant, Esther Choi, and Danny Bowien	December 27, 2022
Ingredients: Appetizer: bucket of meatballs, Persian cucumbers, hot chicken seasoning, peanut brittle; Entrée: canned sardines, pea shoots, mussels, freeze-dried stuffed olives; Dessert: pork floss, Thai basil, rock candy, Vietnamese egg coffee; Contestants: Evan Zagha (eliminated after the appetizer); Soo Ahn (eliminated after the entrée); A.J. Sankofa (eliminated after the dessert); Suchanan “Bao Bao” Aksornnan (winner); Notes: Noodles and pasta were the theme of this episode.
680	2	"Casino Royale XL: Battle One"	Chris Santos, Maneet Chauhan, and Tiffani Faison	January 3, 2023
Ingredients: Appetizer: beef ravioli in a can, king trumpet mushrooms, playing card cookies, caviar service; Entrée: pork uterus, okra, hoisin sauce, truffle mac and cheese; Dessert: wafer cigars, rotisserie chicken, cherries, espresso martini; Contestants: Sami Rodriguez, Chef & Owner (eliminated after the appetizer); Day Joseph, Chef de Cuisine (eliminated after the entrée); Andy Knudson, Executive Chef (eliminated after the dessert); Katherine "Kat" Turner, Chef & Partner (winner); Notes: This was part one of a five-part tournament in which the grand prize was a minimum of $25,000 (with a chance to win more). This casino-themed tournament allowed chefs to bet on and play a game of roulette to exchange one of their basket ingredients for new ingredients hidden under golden (lucky) or black (unlucky) cloches. Unsuccessful bets on red or black resulted in choosing from "unlucky" (bad) ingredients, while successful bets resulted in choosing from "lucky" (good) ingredients. However, the dessert round became a "double down" round with a twist. In addition to the roulette wheel, the chefs were given a second chance if they lost at it. They could either choose an unlucky ingredient or instead play the slots at a slot machine for another chance at choosing a lucky ingredient. But if they lost at the slots, as well, then they would be given the worst, unluckiest possible ingredient available. In the appetizer round, Chef Sami spun the wheel to swap out his playing card cookies for yuzu (by successfully betting on red), and Chef Kat spun the wheel to replace her ravioli in a can with croissants (by successfully betting on black). In the entrée round, Chef Kat spun the wheel to swap her pork uterus for black chicken (by unsuccessfully betting on black), Chef Day spun the wheel to swap her hoisin sauce for a charcuterie board (by successfully betting on red), and Chef Andy spun the wheel to replace his pork uterus with limburger cheese (by unsuccessfully betting on black). In the dessert round, Chef Andy spun the wheel to swap his rotisserie chicken for fermented butter (by unsuccessfully betting on black), and Chef Kat spun the wheel to swap her own rotisserie chicken for cow eyeballs (by first unsuccessfully betting on red and then losing at the slot machine).
681	3	"Casino Royale XL: Battle Two"	Chris Santos, Maneet Chauhan, and Tiffani Faison	January 10, 2023
Ingredients: Appetizer: pork blood, squash blossoms, long bone steak, dice lollipops; Entrée: chitlins, fava beans, cotton candy burrito, rack of lamb; Dessert: garlic juice, oranges, blue cheese stuffed olives, twenty-four-layer chocolate cake; Contestants: Terri Allen, Chef & Owner from Kansas City, MO (eliminated after the appetizer); Alex Lira, Chef & Owner from Charleston, SC (eliminated after the entrée); Alexandra Jones, Chef de Cuisine (eliminated after the dessert); Kirsten Shaw Schmitt, Private Chef (winner); Notes: This was part two of a five-part tournament. In the appetizer round, all four chefs chose to swap out their pork blood, with Chef Terri swapping hers for roasted bone marrow (by successfully betting on red), Chef Alexandra swapping hers for Chinese broccoli (by successfully betting on red), Chef Kirsten swapping hers for Cornish hens (by successfully betting on black), and Chef Alex swapping his for heirloom tomatoes (by successfully betting on black). In the entrée round, Chef Alexandra swapped her chitlins for circus peanuts (by unsuccessfully betting on red), Chef Kirsten swapped her chitlins for chocolate-covered onions (by unsuccessfully betting on red), and Chef Alex swapped his cotton candy burrito for Hen of the Woods mushrooms (by successfully betting on black). In the dessert round, both chefs chose to swap out their garlic juice, with Chef Kirsten swapping hers for vanilla bean paste (by successfully betting on red), and Chef Alexandra swapping hers for salted caramels (by successfully betting on black).
682	4	"Casino Royale XL: Battle Three"	Chris Santos, Tiffani Faison, and Nilou Motamed	January 17, 2023
Ingredients: Appetizer: stargazy pie, sea beans, marshmallows, twenty-four-karat gold chicken wings; Entrée: cured tuna heart, elk medallions, Concord grapes, creamed spinach; Dessert: pork and gelatin, figs, long peppers, Vegas ice cream sundae; Contestants: Jim Armstrong, Executive Chef (eliminated after the appetizer); Brittany Allen, Sous Chef from Miami Beach, FL (eliminated after the entrée); Josh Blum, Private Chef from Miami Beach, FL (eliminated after the dessert); Samantha "Sam" Quintero, Chef (winner); Notes: This was part three of a five-part tournament. In the appetizer round, Chef Sam swapped her marshmallows for skirt steak (by successfully betting on red), Chef Jim swapped his twenty-four-karat chicken wings for lamb leg steaks (by successfully betting on black), Chef Josh swapped his stargazy pie for opah (by successfully betting on black), and Chef Brittany swapped her marshmallows for olive soup (by unsuccessfully betting on black). In the entrée round, all three chefs chose to swap out their cured tuna hearts, with Chef Brittany swapping hers for freeze-dried ice cream sandwiches (by unsuccessfully betting on red), Chef Josh swapping his for pork belly (by successfully betting on red), and Chef Sam swapping hers for gummy sushi (by unsuccessfully betting on red). In the dessert round, Chef Josh swapped out his pork and gelatin for a whole chicken in a can (by unsuccessfully betting on red and then losing at the slots).
683	5	"Casino Royale XL: Battle Four"	Tiffani Faison, Christian Petroni, and Nilou Motamed	January 24, 2023
Ingredients: Appetizer: goat water, wasabi root, vodka cranberry, clams casino; Entrée: eel, bok choy, porterhouse steaks, corn mousse cake; Dessert: hangover burger, aloe vera leaf, oatmeal, chocolate casino chips; Contestants: Ashley Sweeten, Chef de Cuisine & Partner (eliminated after the appetizer); Natascha Hess, Chef & Owner (eliminated after the entrée); Jorge Gomez, Chef & Owner (eliminated after the dessert); Ann Kim, Executive Chef (winner); Notes: This was part four of a five-part tournament. In the appetizer round, Chef Ann swapped her goat water for tuna casserole (by unsuccessfully betting on red), Chef Jorge swapped his vodka cranberry for branzino (by successfully betting on black), and Chef Natascha swapped her wasabi root for duck confit (by successfully betting on red). In the entrée round, all three chefs chose to swap out their eel, with Chef Ann swapping hers for Kauai sweet prawns (by successfully betting on red), Chef Natascha swapping hers for twice-baked potatoes (by successfully betting on red), and Chef Jorge swapping his for baby corn (by successfully betting on black). In the dessert round, both chefs chose swap out their aloe vera leaves, with Chef Ann swapping hers for pears (by unsuccessfully betting on red, but then winning at the slots), and Chef Jorge swapping his for a crepe cake (by successfully betting on black).
684	6	"Casino Royale XL: Grand Finale"	Tiffani Faison, Christian Petroni, and Nilou Motamed	January 31, 2023
Ingredients: Appetizer: lamb’s head, Trevisano, money mints, buffalo ranch chicken fries; Entrée: fish maw, rainbow chard, camel hump fat, lobster; Dessert: liver cheese, giardiniera, champagne, Vegas wedding cake; Contestants: Katherine "Kat" Turner, Chef & Partner (eliminated after the appetizer); Kirsten Shaw Schmitt, Private Chef (eliminated after the entrée); Ann Kim, Executive Chef (eliminated after the dessert); Samantha "Sam" Quintero, Chef (winner); Notes: This is the final part of a five-part tournament. In every round, the chefs played the slots to add to or subtract from the grand prize. Dollar signs would add $5,000 to the pot, while cleavers would subtract just as much from it. In the appetizer round, the chefs got three dollar signs, adding $15,000 total. In the entrée round, the chefs got two dollar signs and a cleaver, adding $5,000 total. In the dessert round, the chefs got two dollar signs and an empty payline, adding $10,000 total and bringing the final pot to a grand total of $55,000. In the appetizer round, Chef Kat swapped her money mints for halibut filets (by successfully betting on red), Chef Kirsten swapped her buffalo chicken fries for alligator hearts (by unsuccessfully betting on black), Chef Sam swapped her buffalo chicken fries for duck bills (by unsuccessfully betting on red), and Chef Ann swapped her buffalo chicken fries for broccoli rabe (by successfully betting on red). In the entrée round, Chef Kirsten swapped her fish maw for brownie hotdogs (by unsuccessfully betting on red). In the dessert round, Chef Ann swapped her liver cheese for mustard ice cream (by unsuccessfully betting on red).
685	7	"Pig Candy"	Darnell Ferguson, Amanda Freitag, and Esther Choi	February 7, 2023
Ingredients: Appetizer: pork belly bao buns, coppa steaks, barbecue-flavored vodka, peaches; Entrée: tongue and blood pudding, mustard greens, porchetta roast, paneer cheese; Dessert: pork neck bones, pickled ginger, cranberries, apple cider doughnuts; Contestants: Amanda Lowry, Private Chef & Caterer (eliminated after the appetizer); Zev Bennett, Corporate Chef (eliminated after the entrée); Winnie Yee-Lakhani, Owner & Pit Madam, Orange County, CA (eliminated after the dessert); Oscar Padilla, Executive Chef (winner); Notes: Every mystery basket included a pork product.
686	8	"Blind Date Night"	Chris Santos, Amanda Freitag, and Tiffani Faison	February 14, 2023
Ingredients: Appetizer: heart-shaped ravioli, red snapper, fairy tale eggplant, scarlet kiss cocktail; Entrée: beet truffles, artichoke hearts, chateaubriand, brie en croute; Dessert: chocolate fondue, grapes, hot honey, hugs & kisses cookies; Contestants: Eric Rockwell and Hayden Haas (eliminated after the appetizer); Alix Bazigos and AJ Oliver (eliminated after the entrée); Henry Hill and Molly Arnett (eliminated after the dessert); Darian Hernandez and Izzy Buasier (winner); Notes: This was a team competition featuring pairs of single chefs meeting for the first time as blind dates. The winning pair also won dinner at one of judge Chris Santos' restaurants in addition to the prize money.
687	9	"Good Ole Creole Cookin'"	Kardea Brown, Amanda Freitag, and Kwame Onwauchi	February 21, 2023
Ingredients: Appetizer: alligator sausage, crawfish, okra, file powder; Entrée: rack of wild boar, chicory, bread pudding beignets, Louisiana caviar; Dessert: king cake milkshake, sweet potatoes, Tasso ham, Creole pralines; Contestants: Maya Mastersson (eliminated after the appetizer); Alanna Fredieu-Porche (eliminated after the entrée); Eva Morris (eliminated after the dessert); Jouvens Jean (winner); Notes: This episode featured creole cuisine, with four creole chefs and creole staple ingredients in each basket.
688	10	"Flamin' Hot"	Maneet Chauhan, Fariyal Abdullahi, and Amanda Freitag	March 7, 2023
Ingredients: Appetizer: Thai peppers, lump crab, cucumbers, spicy cheese curls; Entrée: habanero pepper, boneless leg of lamb, avocado, black pepper ice cream sandwiches; Dessert: ghost pepper, passion fruit, plantains, super spicy citrus soda; Contestants: Nahika Hillery (eliminated after the appetizer); Karan Mittal (eliminated after the entrée); Kimberly S. Gamble (eliminated after the dessert); Matt Jordan (winner); Notes: Each basket contained spicy ingredients, including a variety of chili pepper that got progressively hotter with each round.
689	11	"A Bunch of Abalone!"	Geoffrey Zakarian, Tiffani Faison, and JJ Johnson	March 14, 2023
Ingredients: Appetizer: ube cheesecake, abalone, upland cress, veggie crisps; Entrée: iron eggs, top sirloin cap, lacy cauliflower, spicy peach jam; Dessert: worm salt, Asian pears, lambic beer, rainbow black and white cookies; Contestants: Braunda Smith (eliminated after the appetizer); Jeromy “Jay” Wright (eliminated after the entrée); Camille Le Caer (eliminated after the dessert); McKenna Shea (winner)
690	12	"Uncommon Ramen"	Geoffrey Zakarian, Amanda Freitag, and Tiffani Faison	March 21, 2023
Ingredients: Appetizer: fruity cereal crisps, rock shrimp, enoki mushrooms, birria ramen; Entrée: elk tenderloin, Turkish delight, broccoli rabe, green bean ice pops; Dessert: bologna, oranges, pistachio cream, Spanische windtorte; Contestants: Tess Kim (eliminated after the appetizer); Giuseppe Bellacetin (eliminated after the entrée); Bre Jackson (eliminated after the dessert); Andrew Sargent (winner); Notes: Chef Kim cut herself in the middle of Round 1 and was unable to plate her dish; given the severity of her cut, she was medically evacuated before tasting. However the dishes were still tasted as they would be considered in the final result.
691	13	"Wanna Pizza Me?"	Scott Conant, Ann Kim, and Christian Petroni	March 28, 2023
Ingredients: Appetizer: charcuterie cones, carrots, frozen mozzarella sticks, white anchovies; Entrée: kung pao chicken, lacinato kale, honeycomb, bison sausage; Dessert: vegan pepperoni, strawberries, cupcake-shaped pizzas, dried pineapple rings; Contestants: Miriam Weiskind (eliminated after the appetizer); Michael Carter (eliminated after the entrée); John Carruthers (eliminated after the dessert); Rob Cervoni (winner); Notes: The theme for this episode was making pizza in each round.

=== Season 55 (2023) ===
No. overall	No. in season	Title	Judges	Original release date
692	1	"Fry of the Beholder"	Scott Conant, Amanda Freitag, and Eric Adjepong	April 4, 2023
Ingredients: Appetizer: deep-fried BBQ, zucchini, oysters, onion rings; Entrée: fried pickle corn dogs, nopales, pork secreto, almond milk; Dessert: snack cake tower, bananas, chicken skin, halo-halo fruit mix; Contestants: Steven Moore (eliminated after the appetizer); Blake Cressey (eliminated after the entrée); Ashley Turner (eliminated after the dessert); Alejandro Barrientos (winner); Notes: Each round required something fried. To accommodate the theme, an extra deep fryer and air fryers were provided. The deep-fried BBQ in the appetizer round was a pulled pork fritter topped with coleslaw and BBQ sauce.
693	2	"Fiesta Mexicana"	Chris Santos, Tiffani Faison, and Daniela Soto-Innes	April 11, 2023
Ingredients: Appetizer: chayote squash, tlayuda, cochinta pibil, huitlacoche; Entrée: goat shoulder, yucca, mole poblano, elote ice cream; Dessert: gelatina, cilantro, sotol, chili-lime potato chips; Contestants: Zuriel Barradas Picazo (eliminated after the appetizer); Tania Cuevas (eliminated after the entrée); Saul Montiel (eliminated after the dessert); Cris Brown (winner); Notes: This episode's theme was Mexican cuisine.
694	3	"Ribeye on the Prize"	Chris Santos, Nilou Motamed, and Joe Sasto	April 18, 2023
Ingredients: Appetizer: watermelon cake, thinly sliced rib eye, marinated goat cheese, shishito peppers; Entrée: popcorn, Japanese eggplant, Cornish hens, egg tofu; Dessert: mochi doughnuts, guavas, vanilla frosting, craft cosmopolitan; Contestants: Lauren Lawless (eliminated after the appetizer); Mike Beltran (eliminated after the entrée); Sam Etienne (eliminated after the dessert); Sieger Bayer (winner)
695	4	"Military Salute: Navy"	Marc Murphy, Alex Guarnaschelli, and Sunny Anderson	April 25, 2023
Ingredients: Appetizer: navy bean soup, head-on shrimp, bresaola, finger limes; Entrée: vegetarian taco meat, pineapple, branzino, french fries; Dessert: navy cake, longan fruit, sea salt ice cream bars, halva; Contestants: Seth Chiado (eliminated after the appetizer); Caleb Abdinoor (eliminated after the entrée); Jazmine Anderson (eliminated after the dessert); Georges Labaki (winner); Notes: Part one of a five-part military tournament featuring 16 chefs who serve in the US military. The winner of each heat advances to the finals, where they will team up with the other three finalists to cook against the judges and win up to $75,000 for charity. During the tournament, the first round was extended to 30 minutes. Each heat features chefs from a different branch of the military; this episode featured the Navy.
696	5	"Military Salute: Air Force"	Marc Murphy, Alex Guarnaschelli, and Sunny Anderson	May 2, 2023
Ingredients: Appetizer: pilot bread crackers, rainbow carrots, goat chops, bowl of chili; Entrée: survival coffee, sugar snap peas, airline chicken breast, finadene sauce; Dessert: U.S. Air Force cookies, raspberries, chocolate fudge topping, fruit drink, pickles; Contestants: Mo Frazier, Culinary Specialist from Colorado Springs, CO (eliminated after the appetizer); Xavier Wajid, Services Craftsman from Okinawa, Japan (eliminated after the entrée); Blesam Sadang, Services Craftsman from Little Rock, AR (eliminated after the dessert); Opal Poullard, Advanced Culinary Instructor from Fort Lee, VA (winner); Notes: Part two of five. This heat featured chefs from the Air Force.
697	6	"Military Salute: Marines"	Marc Murphy, Sunny Anderson, and Cliff Crooks	May 9, 2023
Ingredients: Appetizer: ready-to-eat spaghetti, Italian long hots, black cod fillets, orange gelatin cups; Entrée: bulldog gravy, celeriac, veal short ribs, buttermilk pancakes; Dessert: fried chicken ice cream, purple muscadine grapes, candied fennel, chickpeas; Contestants: Cameron Harrell (eliminated after the appetizer); Christopher Brandle (eliminated after the entrée); Blanquivett Cruz (eliminated after the dessert); Dustin Lewis (winner); Notes: Part three of five. This heat featured chefs from the Marines. The fried chicken ice cream in the dessert round was vanilla ice cream molded onto a pretzel rod and coated in cornflakes to look like fried chicken.
698	7	"Military Salute: Army"	Scott Conant, Sunny Anderson, and Cliff Crooks	May 16, 2023
Ingredients: Appetizer: S.O.S., breakfast radishes, quail eggs, crescent roll dough; Entrée: camo apples, guajes verdes, pork tenderloin, fish sauce; Dessert: America milkshake, figs, butter crackers, pandan milk candy; Contestants: Luis Irizarry Rodriguez (eliminated after the appetizer); Deshonta Meares (eliminated after the entrée); Marisabel Arroyo Jordan (eliminated after the dessert); Brian Colvin (winner); Notes: Part four of five. This heat featured chefs from the Army.
699	8	"Military Salute: Finale"	Cliff Crooks, Sunny Anderson, and Scott Conant	May 23, 2023
Ingredients: Appetizer: flag cake, yampi, duck breast, baby artichokes; Entrée: Alaskan king crab, purple spinach, New York strip steak, durian mochi; Dessert: apple pie a la mode, powdered eggs, star fruit, hot dogs; Contestants: Amanda Freitag (eliminated after the appetizer); Eric Adjepong (eliminated after the entrée); Tiffani Faison (eliminated after the dessert); Task force (Georges Labaki, Opal Poullard, Dustin Lewis, and Brian Colvin) (winner); Notes: Final part of the military tournament. The four finalists competed as a team in each round, against a different Chopped judge. A $25,000 donation was made in the name of the winner of each round. Chef Freitag won the first round, and the remaining two were won by the military team. First Lady Jill Biden made an appearance during the final round's judging to thank the military chefs for their service.
700	9	"Get Your Geoducks in a Row"	Geoffrey Zakarian, Maneet Chauhan, and Eric Adjepong	May 30, 2023
Ingredients: Appetizer: beef tendon balls, culantro, jalapeno poppers, Rompope; Entrée: geoduck clams, cherry tomatoes, puffed corn snacks, merguez sausage; Dessert: chocolate strawberry tower, oranges, requeson cheese, shortbread cookies; Contestants: Jordy Rankine, Personal Chef (eliminated after the appetizer); Mollie Guerra, Private Chef (eliminated after the entrée); Taylor Haupt, Private Chef (eliminated after the dessert); Kirstyn Brewer, Chef de Cuisine (winner)
701	10	"FAN-atics"	Scott Conant, Amanda Freitag, and Geoffrey Zakarian	June 6, 2023
Ingredients: Appetizer: dried squid, jicama, lime gelatin cups, shrimp; Entrée: giant gummy bear, pork crown roast, broccolini, cheese puff mac & cheese; Dessert: epic milkshake, strawberry carbonated candy, cricket flour, durian; Contestants: Kenan Holland (eliminated after the appetizer); Jem Iwatsubo (eliminated after the entrée); Kristie Pappas (eliminated after the dessert); Matt Houck (winner); Notes: Each of the chefs in this episode were fans of the show. The first round was 30 minutes instead of 20.
702	11	"Home on the Range"	Maneet Chauhan, Tiffani Faison, and Eddie Jackson	June 13, 2023
Ingredients: Appetizer: rocky mountain oysters, haricots verts, gummy corn on the cob, funeral potatoes; Entrée: prime rib roast, strawberry slab pie, rutabaga, cow foot seasoning; Dessert: cured duck yolks, huckleberries, hoecakes, Montana bourbon cream liqueur; Contestants: Evan Tate, Ranch Manager & Co-Chef from Rockwall, TX (eliminated after the appetizer); Elena Terry, Executive Chef from Wisconsin Dells, WI (eliminated after the entrée); Xavi Montano, Private Ranch Chef from Albuquerque, NM (eliminated after the dessert); Tana Mielke Oliver, Chef & Owner from Walla Walla, WA (winner); Notes: This episode was a special competition for ranch chefs.
703	12	"Too Yacht to Handle"	Scott Conant, Nilou Motamed, and Eric Adjepong	June 20, 2023
Ingredients: Appetizer: tuna loin, saffron, romanesco cauliflower, blue sea cotton candy; Entrée: chicharrones, sea fennel, mackerel, caviar; Dessert: seaweed butter, tropical fruit platter, oyster crackers, mai tai; Contestants: Kelston Moore, Yacht Chef from San Diego, CA (eliminated after the appetizer); Ruthie Kallai, Yacht Chef from Miami, FL (eliminated after the entrée); Mathew Shea, Yacht Chef from Boston, MA (eliminated after the dessert); Abigail Caddy, Chef & Owner from Ft. Lauderdale, FL (winner); Notes: Each of the competitors cooks on a yacht.
704	13	"Meat and Taters!"	Marc Murphy, Tiffani Faison, and Eddie Jackson	June 27, 2023
Ingredients: Appetizer: filet mignon, beef fat fudge, cherry tomatoes, Idaho potatoes; Entrée: bison rib-eyes, steak cake, dandelion greens, green peppercorns; Dessert: roasted marrow bones, hash brown waffles, plums, goat’s milk caramel; Contestants: Brittani Ratcliff (eliminated after the appetizer); Andres Sen Sang (eliminated after the entrée); Jenn Struik (eliminated after the dessert); Marlo Nash (winner); Notes: Every basket featured meat and potatoes.
705	14	"Oh My Squash!"	Chris Santos, Maneet Chauhan, and Eric Adjepong	August 15, 2023
Ingredients: Appetizer: brick French toast, watermelon radishes, smoked peanut butter, canned sardines; Entrée: potato chip omelet, pea greens, Korean-style short ribs, cherry cola; Dessert: giant fortune cookie, gooseberries, blue hubbard squash, camel milk; Contestants: Morgan Ferguson (eliminated after the appetizer); Emilie Rose Bishop (eliminated after the entrée); Rachel McGill (eliminated after the dessert); Jassi Bindra (winner)
706	15	"Julia Child's Kitchen: Part 1"	Scott Conant, Amanda Freitag, and Nilou Motamed	November 14, 2023
Ingredients: Appetizer: blooming onion, baby artichokes, veal osso buco, L’Etivaz cheese; Entrée: pekin duck, caneles, brussels sprouts, orange fruit slices; Dessert: Bitter Frenchman, strawberries, coconut whipped cream, madeleines; Contestants: Janelle Patterson (eliminated after the appetizer); Victor Villarreal (eliminated after the entrée); Jenna Johansen (eliminated after the dessert); Dan Fox (winner)
707	16	"Julia Child's Kitchen: Part 2"	Scott Conant, Amanda Freitag, and Michael Voltaggio	December 5, 2023
Ingredients: Appetizer: fish heads, pomelo, brown butter macaron, salade lyonnaise; Entrée: wagyu beef bavette, chanterelle mushrooms, petite mirepoix, red wine powder; Dessert: orange ice cream pops, candy cane beets, ramen noodles, French whiskey; Contestants: Natalie Blake (eliminated after the appetizer); Abbie Serbins (eliminated after the entrée); Stanley Hagerman (eliminated after the dessert); Mike Andrzejewski (winner); Notes: This episode's original airing was out of order, after parts 1, 3, and 4 of the tournament aired.
708	17	"Julia Child's Kitchen: Part 3"	Scott Conant, Alex Guarnaschelli, and Isabella Rossellini	November 21, 2023
Ingredients: Appetizer: instant mashed potatoes, shredded carrots, nicoise olives, chicken hearts; Entrée: pig head, thyme, cannellini beans, duck fat caramel; Dessert: ostrich egg, raspberries, whipped coffee with boba, chocolate Eiffel Tower; Contestants: Dom Crisp (eliminated after the appetizer); Al Smith (eliminated after the entrée); Sayeh Tavangar (eliminated after the dessert); Javauneeka Jacobs (winner); Notes: The appetizer basket was presented by David Hyde Pierce. The entree basket was presented by Brittany Bradford. The dessert basket was presented by Fran Kranz.
709	18	"Julia Child's Kitchen: Part 4"	Scott Conant, Alex Guarnaschelli, and Susan Feniger	November 28, 2023
Ingredients: Appetizer: bacon Bloody Mary, radishes, broken sugar with saffron, seafood subscription box; Entrée: mushroom meringues, hamburger meal mix, rainbow carrots, veal rib chops; Dessert: spray cheese, quince, phyllo dough, beurre de baratte; Contestants: Rachel Ponce (eliminated after the appetizer); Briana Ditommaso (eliminated after the entrée); Joy Parham (eliminated after the dessert); Andrew Wagner (winner)
710	19	"Julia Child's Kitchen: Finale"	Scott Conant, Alex Guarnaschelli, and Susan Feniger	December 12, 2023
Ingredients: Appetizer: black garlic molasses, scotch bonnet peppers, country pate, wild burgundy snails; Entrée: vegan scallops, geltuce, venison tenderloin, crescent dough; Dessert: dragon fruit, hazelnut spread, chocolate fondue, ice cream spheres; Contestants: Andrew Wagner (eliminated after the appetizer); Mike Andrzejewski (eliminated after the entrée); Dan Fox (eliminated after the dessert); Javauneeka Jacobs (winner)

=== Season 56 (2023–24) ===
No. overall	No. in season	Title	Judges	Original release date
711	1	"Burger: Impossible"	Geoffrey Zakarian, Tiffany Derry, and Justin Sutherland	August 22, 2023
Ingredients: Appetizer: cheesesteak-stuffed pickles, salsa verde, thick cut bacon, wagyu beef cheek; Entrée: cheese “cake”, pearl onions, crunchy garlic with chili oil, leg of lamb; Dessert: french fry cookies, cherries, honey butter, chocolate rice cereal; Contestants: Melanie Schoendorfer (eliminated after the appetizer); Pat McHenry (eliminated after the entrée); LaMara Davidson (eliminated after the dessert); Michael Pham (winner)
712	2	"Gummy-Side Up"	Marc Murphy, Maneet Chauhan, and Brooke Williamson	August 29, 2023
Ingredients: Appetizer: gummy pickles, popcorn shoots, honey sriracha, scallops; Entrée: lasagna soup, turnips, veal cutlets, crispy onion snacks; Dessert: bento cake, honeydew melon, pretzel salt, spicy mango pops; Contestants: Sydney Fisher (eliminated after the appetizer); Austin Schwartz (eliminated after the entrée); Vicky Colas (eliminated after the dessert); Matthew Rolnick (winner)
713	3	"Beef Knuckle Down"	Marc Murphy, Brooke Williamson, and Tiffany Derry	September 5, 2023
Ingredients: Appetizer: kimchi fries, kohlrabi, tequila brittle, rock shrimp; Entrée: menudo, beef knuckle, sunchokes, banana soda; Dessert: bacon and pancake pizza, macadamias, kiwis, clotted cream; Contestants: Alex Koones (eliminated after the appetizer); Jan Parker (eliminated after the entrée); Adam Finzel (eliminated after the dessert); Malcolm Prude (winner)
714	4	"Mouth of the South"	Darnell Ferguson, Maneet Chauhan, and Kelsey Nixon	September 12, 2023
Ingredients: Appetizer: vegan fried chicken, corn on the cob, shrimp, pimento cheese tomato pie; Entrée: deep-fried deviled eggs, turnip greens, pork chops, biscuits & gravy casserole; Dessert: banana pudding cheesecake, sweet potatoes, dehydrated marshmallow bits, Tennessee strawberry cream liqueur; Contestants: Alison Settle (eliminated after the appetizer); Duke Kroger (eliminated after the entrée); Sean Reaves (eliminated after the dessert); Star Maye (winner); Notes: The theme of this episode was Southern cooking.
715	5	"Halloween Spooktacular"	Chris Santos, Amanda Freitag, and Sunny Anderson	September 19, 2023
Ingredients: Appetizer: pasta “brain”, roasted pumpkin seeds, red jalapeno peppers, edible gummy “eyeballs”; Entrée: sausage “head”, squid ink risotto, butternut squash, “poison” candy apples; Dessert: “skeleton” cookies, candy corn, snake fruit, Shirley Temple “syringe”; Contestants: Connie Cossio (eliminated after the appetizer); Zach Neil (eliminated after the entrée); Jeana Pecha (eliminated after the dessert); Robert Alexander (winner)
716	6	"Friendsgiving"	Scott Conant, Nilou Motamed, and Chris Santos	November 7, 2023
Ingredients: Appetizer: ice cream frozen dinner, mustard greens, canned spiced turkey, butter board; Entrée: turducken dog, honey nut squash, turkey breast, broccoli and cauliflower gratin; Dessert: cranberry pie cake, blood oranges, pumpkin pie soda, pecans; Contestants: Q Ibraheem and Sebastian White (eliminated after the appetizer); Robin Selden and Nettie Frank (eliminated after the entrée); Max Bren and Calvin Hwang (eliminated after the dessert); Angie Garza and Emma Burke (winner); Notes: This episode had contestants competing in teams of friends, as well as Thanksgiving-themed ingredients.
717	7	"Grand Champs' Holiday Hurrah"	Scott Conant, Maneet Chauhan, and Eric Adjepong	December 19, 2023
Ingredients: Appetizer: sardine candy canes, holiday pasta, citron, sushi menorah; Entrée: Santa meatloaf, sword lettuce, camel rib-eye roast, mistletoe martini; Dessert: frozen fruitcake salad, pomegranates, gingerbread cookie dough, mini booze bottle tree; Contestants: Christina Coupet (Alton's Maniacal Baskets) (eliminated after the appetizer); Melvin "Boots" Johnson (Grill Masters 2018) (eliminated after the entrée); Kaleena Bliss (Casino Royale 2022) (eliminated after the dessert); Annisha Marccel (Playing with Fire) (winner); Notes: This episode featured 4 tournament winners competing for charity. Each basket had holiday themed ingredients.
718	8	"Uni Versed?"	Marc Murphy, Tiffany Derry, and Stephanie Izard	December 26, 2023
Ingredients: Appetizer: uni shooters, mizuna, rice balls, fried onions; Entrée: cream of mushroom soup, cone cabbage, bahn mi, dover fillets; Dessert: red hot jawbreakers, blackberries, lychee drink, pastel de elote; Contestants: Scotty Scott (eliminated after the appetizer); Oakason Hoffman (eliminated after the entrée); Jessica Wilkins (eliminated after the dessert); Ciaran McGoldrick (winner)
719	9	"Neck and Neck"	Geoffrey Zakarian, Fariyal Abdullahi, and Marc Murphy	January 2, 2024
Ingredients: Appetizer: deep-fried ice cream bars, delicata squash, crab miso. slipper lobsters; Entrée: chicken pot pie bites, rainbow carrots, ostrich necks, curry ketchup; Dessert: neapolitan roll, pears, potato chip clusters, salad cream; Contestants: Connor Kaminski (eliminated after the appetizer); Rain Grey (eliminated after the entrée); Arielle Brown (eliminated after the dessert); Davante Burnley (winner)
720	10	"Don't Lose Heart"	Geoffrey Zakarian, Esther Choi, and Justin Sutherland	January 9, 2024
Ingredients: Appetizer: alligator hearts, snow peas, za’atar pita chips, marshmallow spread; Entrée: birthday babka, Italian puntarella, beet hummus, squab; Dessert: croquembouche, kumquats, licorice root, aged balsamic; Contestants: Quincy Randolph (eliminated after the appetizer); Brandon Olson (eliminated after the entrée); Keis Briscoe (eliminated after the dessert); Kayla Pfeiffer (winner)
721	11	"Make No "Misteak""	Geoffrey Zakarian, Nilou Motamed, and Cliff Crooks	January 16, 2024
Ingredients: Appetizer: stuffed croissant rolls, garlic chives, dandelion sparkling tea, razor clams; Entrée: taco salad, caperberries, Denver steaks, rice pudding; Dessert: frozen breakfast sandwiches, satsuma, buttermilk, pretzel pizza; Contestants: Katharine Elder (eliminated after the appetizer); Bernard Bennett (eliminated after the entrée); Lei Jiang (eliminated after the dessert); Jada Vidal (winner)
722	12	"Double-Edged Swordfish"	Geoffrey Zakarian, Amanda Freitag, and Kwame Onwuachi	January 23, 2024
Ingredients: Appetizer: 3-cup chicken, leeks, salsa con queso, far far; Entrée: mini pie treats, Ataulfo mangos, swordfish steaks, green goddess dip; Dessert: popcorn cake, mangosteens, chocolate blue cheese, dragon fruit powder; Contestants: Lana Lagomarsini (eliminated after the appetizer); Kenneth McDuffie (eliminated after the entrée); Ian McHugh (eliminated after the dessert); Jax Beaubien (winner); Notes: Although not in the original airing, later reruns of this episode were dedicated to Jax Beaubien, due to her death in May 2023. This marks the third time a contestant has competed posthoumously.
723	13	"Claws Out!"	Marc Murphy, Fariyal Abdullahi, and Geoffrey Zakarian	January 30, 2024
Ingredients: Appetizer: stone crab claws, fairy toast, pink lemons, mostarda; Entrée: mint chocolate chip dip, Italian eggplants, ranch powder, bison sirloin tip steaks; Dessert: danish dream cake, raspberries, botanical mule mocktail, peanut butter banana balls; Contestants: Theo Moise (eliminated after the appetizer); Keyhone Russell (eliminated after the entrée); Jeffrey Compton (eliminated after the dessert); Alexia Orsburn (winner)

=== Season 57 (2024) ===
No. overall	No. in season	Title	Judges	Original release date
724	1	"Spin It to Win It: Battle 1 Part 1"	Amanda Freitag, Christian Petroni, and Maneet Chauhan	February 6, 2024
Ingredients: Appetizer: octopus, peanut butter soup, purple spinach, nopales; Entrée: frog legs, chanterelles, acai bowl, watermelon curry; Dessert: honey toast, baby bananas, quince paste, apricot kernel drink; Contestants: Shawn Osbey (eliminated after the appetizer); Allyson Harvie (eliminated after the entrée); Angie Bethea (eliminated after the dessert); Cidney Wilcox (winner)
725	2	"Spin It to Win It: Battle 2"	Maneet Chauhan, Brian Malarkey, and Amanda Freitag	February 6, 2024
Ingredients: Appetizer: comic cake, finger limes, wagyu beef bacon, pot roast in a can; Entrée: orange-scented tahini, broccoli rabe, rockfish, calf’s foot jelly; Dessert: hot dog pie, granny smith apples, vanilla bean paste, carbonated strawberry candy; Contestants: Dominique Webberhunt (eliminated after the appetizer); Jay Tucker (eliminated after the entrée); Cidney Wilcox (eliminated after the dessert); Becky Brown (winner)
726	3	"Spin It to Win It: Battle 3"	Amanda Freitag, Brian Malarkey, and Tiffani Faison	February 13, 2024
Ingredients: Appetizer: cotton candy-wrapped pickle, long bone burger, sunchokes, baby eels in olive oil; Entrée: manti, cauliflower, ostrich steaks, pork brains in gravy; Dessert: crepe roll, rhubarb, jalapenos, burnt sugar syrup; Contestants: Chris Motto (eliminated after the appetizer); Becky Brown (eliminated after the entrée); Quentin Garcia (eliminated after the dessert); Peter McQuaid (winner)
727	4	"Spin It to Win It: Battle 4"	Tiffani Faison, Christian Petroni, and Amanda Freitag	February 20, 2024
Ingredients: Appetizer: Atlantic moon snails, chive buds, butterfly pea tea, musk sticks; Entrée: elote dip, maraschinos, squab, galanga; Dessert: mini egg & cheese croissants, kumquats, vanilla frosting, Szechuan peppercorns; Contestants: Joey Stallings (eliminated after the appetizer); Rose Menendez (eliminated after the entrée); Ryan Bush (eliminated after the dessert); Peter McQuaid (winner)
728	5	"Spin It to Win It: Final Battle!"	Amanda Freitag, Christian Petroni, and Maneet Chauhan	February 27, 2024
Ingredients: Appetizer: roasted lamb’s head, Italian puntarelle, chicken soup martini, Twinkies; Entrée: pork crown roast, baby artichokes, red bean taiyaki, beef bile; Dessert: cakesicle tower, tamarillos, giant gummy bear, dried yogurt; Contestants: Sami Slenker (eliminated after the appetizer); Rushaune “Rush” Thompson (eliminated after the entrée); Josh Mouzakes (eliminated after the dessert); Peter McQuaid (winner)
729	6	"A Taste of China"	Maneet Chauhan, Danny Bowien, and Shirley Chung	March 5, 2024
Ingredients: Appetizer: wonton wrappers, pak choi, ground chicken, bingtang hulu; Entrée: soy glaze, Chinese bitter melon, side of salmon, deep fried milk; Dessert: chow mein noodles, milk tea, jackfruit, dragon’s beard candy; Contestants: Katie Chin (eliminated after the appetizer); Justine Ma (eliminated after the entrée); David Wang (eliminated after the dessert); Laurence Louie (winner); Notes: The theme of this episode was Chinese food. Each round had Jack Black give the competitors hints on the basket ingredients, in concurrence with Kung Fu Panda 4.
730	7	"As Duck Would Have It"	Maneet Chauhan, Marcus Samuelsson, and Nilou Motamed	March 12, 2024
Ingredients: Appetizer: tea-smoked duck, snow pea tips, scotch bonnet peppers, canned mandarins; Entrée: smash burger tacos, long beans, red snapper, maitake mushrooms; Dessert: fruit-filled watermelon slices, blackberries, oaxaca cheese, cornbread mix; Contestants: Pauline Zancanaro (eliminated after the appetizer); Chris Federowicz (eliminated after the entrée); Mikhala Bagot (eliminated after the dessert); David Ho (winner)
731	8	"Truffle Kerfuffle"	Geoffrey Zakarian, Ann Kim, and Christian Petroni	March 19, 2024
Ingredients: Appetizer: burgundy truffles, truffled deviled eggs, Belgian endive, scallops in the shell; Entrée: white truffles, crunchy truffle chili sauce, okra, New York strip steaks; Dessert: perigord truffles, truffle fries, strawberries, vanilla ice cream; Contestants: Sarah Baldwin (eliminated after the appetizer); Charley Donnelly (eliminated after the entrée); Dennis Efthymiou (eliminated after the dessert); Lena Le (winner); Notes: The theme of this episode was truffles.
732	9	"Breakfast Baskets!"	Brooke Williamson, Geoffrey Zakarian, and Maneet Chauhan	March 26, 2024
Ingredients: Appetizer: pancake mix, thick cut bacon, green tomatoes, rainbow fruit parfait; Entrée: oats, sausage links, grapes, canned quail eggs; Dessert: scrapple, apples, hashbrowns, durian coffee; Contestants: Tobias Dorzon (eliminated after the appetizer); Huyen Dinh (eliminated after the entrée); Aaron Fish (eliminated after the dessert); Jen Swan (winner); Notes: The theme of this episode was breakfast.
733	10	"Avocado Bravado"	Marc Murphy, Alex Guarnaschelli, and Daniela Soto-Innes	July 9, 2024
Ingredients: Appetizer: tropical avocado, avocado doughnuts, grapefruit, lump crab; Entrée: onigirazu, Hass avocados, pork Secreto, rainbow carrots; Dessert: monroe avocado, avocado mojito, raspberries, liege waffles; Contestants: Karina Garcia (eliminated after the appetizer); Adam Munroe (eliminated after the entrée); LJ Herschlip (eliminated after the dessert); Allie McMillan (winner)
734	11	"Crustacean Craze"	Nilou Motamed, Marcus Samuelsson, and Esther Choi	July 16, 2024
Ingredients: Appetizer: Alaskan king crab, seacuterie board, Persian cucumbers, biscuit dough; Entrée: blue lobsters, baby corn, Calabrian chiles, frozen bacon-wrapped scallops; Dessert: candied crabs, mayonnaise ice cream, makrut lime leaves, mangos; Contestants: Christopher Petrillo (eliminated after the appetizer); Kacie Skalak (eliminated after the entrée); Richelle “Shiki” Espinosa-Brewer (eliminated after the dessert); Gary Caldwell (winner)
735	12	"Heart and Sole"	Marc Murphy, Alyse Whitney, and Geoffrey Zakarian	July 23, 2024
Ingredients: Appetizer: sour candy grapes, Argentinian sausage, fennel, obi non; Entrée: sriracha sundae, Romanesco cauliflower, dover sole filets, instant mashed potatoes; Dessert: assorted baklava, truffle honey, quince, far far; Contestants: Doug Cox (eliminated after the appetizer); Kristen Shelton (eliminated after the entrée); Adam Lajara (eliminated after the dessert); Enrique Lozano (winner)
736	13	"Celtuce Setbacks"	Marc Murphy, Tiffani Faison, and Joe Sasto	August 13, 2024
Ingredients: Appetizer: jalapeno popper eggrolls, cone cabbage, canned spiced ham, cava; Entrée: spray cheese, venison porterhouse, celtuce, bread with a butter candle; Dessert: flowerpot dessert, satsuma, potato chips, licorice root; Contestants: Jordan Savell (eliminated after the appetizer); John Thomas (eliminated after the entrée); Juwan Rice (eliminated after the dessert); Ashley Lujares (winner)

=== Season 58 (2024) ===
No. overall	No. in season	Title	Judges	Original release date
737	1	"Squidding Around"	Geoffrey Zakarian, Brooke Williamson, and Alyse Whitney	April 2, 2024
Ingredients: Appetizer: chimichanga hot dog, squid, mizuna, half-gallon black sesame milk; Entrée: pork collar, pastel de nata, fresno peppers, mushroom chips; Dessert: marshmallow chicks, bananas, canned paloma, walnut preserves; Contestants: Alexis Krisel (eliminated after the appetizer); Laura Liggins (eliminated after the entrée); Randy Pasch (eliminated after the dessert); Amanda Palomino (winner)
738	2	"Trash into Treasure"	Marc Murphy, Tiffany Derry, and Fariyal Abdullahi	April 9, 2024
Ingredients: Appetizer: shrimp shells, shrimp, pickle juice, blue oyster mushrooms; Entrée: carrot tops, asparagus stems, leftover baked ziti, lamb neck; Dessert: orange peels, hotdog buns, pantry bars, expired milk; Contestants: Christian Isquierdo (eliminated after the appetizer); Jamisen Booker (eliminated after the entrée); Shanel DeWalt (eliminated after the dessert); Zach Hutton (winner)
739	3	"Abalone Absurdities"	Maneet Chauhan, Geoffrey Zakarian, and Shirley Chung	April 16, 2024
Ingredients: Appetizer: stuffing mix, watermelon radishes, abalone, corn candy; Entrée: matzah ball pho, purple broccoli, rack of lamb, halva; Dessert: strawberry pizza, tarragon, century eggs, citron tea concentrate; Contestants: McKenzie O’Leary (eliminated after the appetizer); Reeza Villa (eliminated after the entrée); Adam Hoffa (eliminated after the dessert); Jimmy Matiz (winner)
740	4	"Easy Breezy, Mac and Cheesy"	Maneet Chauhan, Geoffrey Zakarian, and Brooke Williamson	April 23, 2024
Ingredients: Appetizer: Cheetos bold & cheesy mac ‘n cheese, smoked turkey legs, cauliflower, vanilla milkshake; Entrée: candied pickles, coulotte steaks, Rice-a-Roni Mexican style, rainbow chard; Dessert: buttercream board, freeze-dried blueberries, pistachios, fried rosette cookies; Contestants: Lyndsey Waters (eliminated after the appetizer); Deborah Jean (eliminated after the entrée); Sean Quan (eliminated after the dessert); Zakari Davila (winner)
741	5	"Battle Italiano: Emilia-Romagna"	Scott Conant, Alex Guarnaschelli, and Gabe Bertaccini	April 30, 2024
Ingredients: Appetizer: eel, chard, prosciutto, frozen lasagna; Entrée: bolognese potato chips, dried porcini mushrooms, veal chops, balsamic vinegar; Dessert: Parmigiano Reggiano chiffon cake, Amarena cherries, sugar pumpkins, fennel; Contestants: Shelby Fahrni (eliminated after the appetizer); Joey Gaglio (eliminated after the entrée); Alex Napolitano (eliminated after the dessert); Sabrina Tinsley (winner)
742	6	"Battle Italiano: Veneto"	Scott Conant, Tiffany Derry, and Gabe Bertaccini	May 7, 2024
Ingredients: Appetizer: squid ink ice cream, treviso, sopressa, razor clams; Entrée: whole goose, garlic bread, white asparagus, polenta; Dessert: tiramisu brownies, asiago cheese, pears, cotton candy bellini; Contestants: Gina Chersevani (eliminated after the appetizer); Amy Sur-Trevino (eliminated after the entrée); German Rizzo (eliminated after the dessert); Pat Pascarella (winner)
743	7	"Battle Italiano: Puglia"	Scott Conant, Alex Guarnaschelli, and Gabe Bertaccini	May 14, 2024
Ingredients: Appetizer: octopus sandwich, broccoli rabe, mussels, olive oil frosting; Entrée: Assassin’s spaghetti, eggplant, lampascioni, leg of lamb; Dessert: Focaccia Pugliese, prickly pear, burrata, almonds in the shell; Contestants: Josh White (eliminated after the appetizer); Mario Brugnoli (eliminated after the entrée); Preston Paine (eliminated after the dessert); Antonello Zito (winner)
744	8	"Battle Italiano: Tuscany"	Scott Conant, Tiffany Derry, and Gabe Bertaccini	May 21, 2024
Ingredients: Appetizer: cockscombs, heirloom tomatoes, wild boar, cannellini beans; Entrée: porterhouses, chicken liver crostinis, Tuscan kale, negroni gelatin shots; Dessert: rose petal jam, dried strawberries, Lardo di colonnata, Italian cookie tray; Contestants: Dwight Sanon (eliminated after the appetizer); Leigh Hutchinson (eliminated after the entrée); Julia Weeman (eliminated after the dessert); Robbie Jester (winner)
745	9	"Battle Italiano: Finale"	Scott Conant, Alex Guarnaschelli, and Gabe Bertaccini	May 28, 2024
Ingredients: Appetizer: pizza in tube, zucchini blossoms, zampone, Caciocavallo cheese; Entrée: branzino, Pesche Dolci, artichokes, alfredo sauce; Dessert: testaroli, mortadella ice cream, goji berries, citron; Contestants: Pat Pascarella (eliminated after the appetizer); Robbie Jester (eliminated after the entrée); Sabrina Tinsley (eliminated after the dessert); Antonello Zito (winner); Notes: The chefs were given 30 minutes in the appetizer round instead of the usual 20.
746	10	"Gimme Guilty Pleasures"	Eddie Jackson, Chris Santos, and Kelsey Barnard Clark	June 4, 2024
Ingredients: Appetizer: doughnut burger, canned green beans, ranch dressing, chicken wings; Entrée: fried pickles, butter-flavored soda, french fries, ribeye steaks; Dessert: gummy hot dogs, strawberries, cinnamon rolls, chocolate hazelnut spread; Contestants: Bohdan “Bo” Porytko (eliminated after the appetizer); Margaret Alvis (eliminated after the entrée); Justin Webster (eliminated after the dessert); Sam Cruz (winner)
747	11	"Drag Brunch"	Tiffani Faison, Miss Ginger, and Gabe Bertaccini	June 11, 2024
Ingredients: Appetizer: espresso martini, avocados, pork belly, PB&J pancakes; Entrée: rainbow steamed cake, skirt steak, eggplants, sausage gravy; Dessert: disco ball croquembouche, gooseberries, salted caramel, pride candy; Contestants: Corey Milliman (eliminated after the appetizer); Chris Ricketts (eliminated after the entrée); Arnold Myint (eliminated after the dessert); Jenn Strange (winner)
748	12	"Tickled Pink Pineapple"	Tiffany Derry, Marc Murphy, and Daniela Soto-Innes	June 18, 2024
Ingredients: Appetizer: pickled pig lips, leeks, fish sticks, finger chiles; Entrée: pork tenderloin, brussels sprouts, vegetable goat cheese log, cola; Dessert: salted egg yolk paste, pink pineapple, wafer sheets, spice drops; Contestants: Andres Vegas (eliminated after the appetizer); Nick Swanson (eliminated after the entrée); Jon Hicks (eliminated after the dessert); Duyen Ha (winner)
749	13	"Southwestern Strength"	Chris Santos, Kelsey Nixon, and Eddie Jackson	June 25, 2024
Ingredients: Appetizer: 3 sisters casserole, nopales, fry bread, quail; Entrée: elk tenderloin, Chile ristras, cheese tamales, prickly pear; Dessert: white chocolate chips, ruby red grapefruit, mesquite flower, cactus macarons; Contestants: Tony Smith (eliminated after the appetizer); Ashley Brown (eliminated after the entrée); Israel “Izz” Rivera (eliminated after the dessert); Derek Christensen (winner)

=== Season 59 (2024–25) ===
No. overall	No. in season	Title	Judges	Original release date
750	1	"Basket Antics"	Tiffani Faison, Joe Sasto, and Stephanie Boswell	August 20, 2024
Ingredients: Appetizer: “cheeseburger”, “ice cream”, chicken tenders, “onion rings”; Entrée: "shrimp cocktail”, “pigs in a blanket”, “sunny side up eggs”, skate wings; Dessert: “red wine”, “smoked ham”, “popcorn”, “shaved ice”; Contestants: Charlotte Shores (eliminated after the appetizer); Ben Siman Tov (eliminated after the entrée); Elaina Ruth (eliminated after the dessert); Cody Candelario (winner); Notes: Chef Candelario previously competed on the nineteenth season of Hell's Kitchen, where he came in fourth place, getting eliminated right before the finale. Chef Ruth also Competed in Hell's Kitchen Season twenty-four where she came in seventeenth place.
751	2	"Death Is Not An Option"	Geoffrey Zakarian, Maneet Chauhan, and Jet Tila	August 27, 2024
Ingredients: Appetizer: rattlesnake, duck head soup, mangos, bagels; Entrée: whole skinned alligator, starfruit, cassava, shark teeth candy; Dessert: scorpion lollipops, black plums, hot dogs, death in the afternoon cocktail; Contestants: Holly Hearn (eliminated after the appetizer); Mike Casanova (eliminated after the entrée); Charlie Ray (eliminated after the dessert); Nick Chavez (winner)
752	3	"Legends: Scott Conant"	Scott Conant, Marc Murphy, and Amanda Freitag	September 3, 2024
Ingredients: Appetizer: spaghetti ice pops, burrata, ground pork, red onions; Entrée: polenta log, puntarelle, rack of goat, giant cannoli; Dessert: chocolate souffle, Japanese strawberries, chunky peanut butter, yufka; Contestants: Suchanan “Bao Bao” Aksornnan (eliminated after the appetizer); Francisco "Paco" Moran (eliminated after the entrée); Pat Pascarella (eliminated after the dessert); Sara Bradley (winner); Notes: This is the first part of a five-part tournament where four regular Chopped judges invited four of their favorite competitors back to compete alongside them as sous chefs in the finale.
753	4	"Legends: Chris Santos"	Chris Santos, Tiffani Faison, and Marc Murphy	September 10, 2024
Ingredients: Appetizer: French dip sliders, daikon, tuna loin, bacon roses; Entrée: cream of mushroom soup, bok choy, bavette steak, pickleback shots; Dessert: cereal treat tower, lychee, habanero hot sauce, chocolate corndog; Contestants: Zuri Resendiz (eliminated after the appetizer); Lauren Windham (eliminated after the entrée); Melvin "Boots" Johnson (eliminated after the dessert); Kat Turner (winner); Notes: This is the second part of a five-part tournament where four regular Chopped judges invited four of their favorite competitors back to compete alongside them as sous chefs in the finale.
754	5	"Legends: Alex Guarnaschelli"	Alex Guarnaschelli, Marcus Samuelsson, and Eric Adjepong	September 17, 2024
Ingredients: Appetizer: hiramasa, jumbo asparagus, Paris-Brest, pork pate; Entrée: slice of pizza, parsnips, trimmed deckle meat, Italian maraschinos; Dessert: gooey butter cake, black mission figs, macadamias, Gruyere cheese caramels; Contestants: Antonello Zito (eliminated after the appetizer); Javauneeka Jacobs (eliminated after the entrée); Annisha Garcia (eliminated after the dessert); Hosea Rosenberg (winner); Notes: This is the third part of a five-part tournament where four regular Chopped judges invited four of their favorite competitors back to compete alongside them as sous chefs in the finale.
755	6	"Legends: Maneet Chauhan"	Maneet Chauhan, Amanda Freitag, and Eric Adjepong	September 24, 2024
Ingredients: Appetizer: gulab jamun, curry leaves, fuzzy squash, rabbit ginger sausage; Entrée: Nashville hot chicken paste, Buddha’s hand, lamb shanks, paratha; Dessert: bushwacker, persimmons, buttermilk biscuits, chai chocolate bars; Contestants: Jassi Bindra (eliminated after the appetizer); Brittany Rescigno (eliminated after the entrée); Peter McQuaid (eliminated after the dessert); Christopher Walker (winner); Notes: This is the fourth part of a five-part tournament where four regular Chopped judges invited four of their favorite competitors back to compete alongside them as sous chefs in the finale.
756	7	"Legends: Grand Finale"	Tiffani Faison, Marcus Samuelsson, and Amanda Freitag	October 1, 2024
Ingredients: Appetizer: pork blood ice cream, sorrel, tornado omelet, beef tongue; Entrée: durian, Brussels sprouts on the stalk, whole duck, cotton candy cake; Dessert: orange chocolate egg, basil, raw licorice, haggis in a can; Contestants: Christopher Walker and Maneet Chauhan (eliminated after the appetizer); Kat Turner and Chris Santos (eliminated after the entrée); Hosea Rosenberg and Alex Guarnaschelli (eliminated after the dessert); Sara Bradley and Scott Conant (winner); Notes: This episode had regular Chopped judges competing with the winning chefs they picked as their sous chefs. In season 53, episode 13, Chefs Bradley and Rosenberg competed against each other, so the dessert round here was a rematch between them. Chef Bradley gave her winnings to Chef Rosenberg to help his daughter battling cancer.
757	8	"Celebrating Hispanic Heritage"	Franco Noriega, Daniela Soto-Innes, and Claudette Zepeda	October 8, 2024
Ingredients: Appetizer: plantains, huitlacoche, pernil, churros; Entrée: arepas, oca, corvina, cajeta; Dessert: concha ice cream sandwiches, guava, queso fresco, a pitcher of margarita; Contestants: Ryan Perez (eliminated after the appetizer); Juan Meza (eliminated after the entrée); Milena Pagan (eliminated after the dessert); Mercedes Rojas (winner)
758	9	"Hungry for Love: Dating"	Scott Conant, Tiffani Faison, and Fariyal Abdullahi	April 8, 2025
Ingredients: Appetizer: deep-fried chocolate-covered strawberries, salty fingers, oysters, champagne; Entrée: movie theater popcorn, turnips, rose veal ribeye, Fondue; Dessert: raspberry lemon tart, cherries, marcona almonds, affogato; Contestants: Alyssa Osinga and Alejando Najar (eliminated after the appetizer); Abigail (Abby) Kirn and Carlos De La Concha (eliminated after the entrée); Karen Machuca and Nicolas Anson Hartanto (eliminated after the dessert); Carlos Hernandez and Jonathan Harrison (winner)
759	10	"Hungry for Love: Married"	Scott Conant, Jet Tila, and Tiffani Faison	April 15, 2025
Ingredients: Appetizer: jumbo lollipop ring, lacy cauliflower, Italian wedding soup, lobster tails; Entrée: personalized wedding cookies, corn on the cob, chicken breasts, burger meal mix; Dessert: wedding cake top, passionfruit, whipped cream, Kashmiri chili powder; Contestants: Laura & Eric Lee (eliminated after the appetizer); Kwini & Michael Reed (eliminated after the entrée); Maricsa Trejo & Alex Henderson (eliminated after the dessert); Talia & Hedy Trovato (winner)
760	11	"Hungry for Love: Exes"	Tiffani Faison, Jet Tila, and Fariyal Abdullahi	April 22, 2025
Ingredients: Appetizer: soup dumplings, tiny cucumbers, burger patties, breakup milkshake; Entrée: flounder fillets, chicory, mezcal, poke nachos; Dessert: broken chocolate heart, blood oranges, coconut milk, forget-me-nots; Contestants: Tyler Weeks & Liz Serrone (eliminated after the appetizer); Bruce Gasirowski & Ambyr Owens-Hayes (eliminated after the entrée); Devown Hines & Bri Cook (eliminated after the dessert); Cate Strauser & Jon Thoma (winner)
761	12	"Hungry for Love: Blind Date"	Chris Santos, Tiffani Faison, and Eric Adjepong	April 29, 2025
Ingredients: Appetizer: bouquet of flowers, pea greens, halibut filets, date syrup; Entrée: beef heart, massaged kale salad, leche de Tigre, dirty martini; Dessert: chocolate lips, figs, olive oil tortas, conversation hearts; Contestants: Joel Bautista & Brenna McBroom (eliminated after the appetizer); Evan Monat-Edelstein & Victoria Cosner (eliminated after the entrée); Aaron Bradford & Kevin Livingston (eliminated after the dessert); Maddie Dudek & Joe Mangipano (winner)
762	13	"Hungry for Love: Finale"	Chris Santos, Tiffani Faison, and Eric Adjepong	May 6, 2025
Ingredients: Appetizer: lamb chops, sweet potato poutine, petite mixed carrots, hot honey; Entrée: chateaubriand, tomato burrata salad, baby spinach, saffron; Dessert: pancake tiered cake, love bites, pears, ube condensed milk; Contestants: Carlos Hernandez and Jonathan Harrison (eliminated after the appetizer); Maddie Dudek & Joe Mangipano (eliminated after the entrée); Cate Strauser & Jon Thoma (eliminated after the dessert); Talia & Hedy Trovato (winner)

=== Season 60 (2024–25) ===
No. overall	No. in season	Title	Judges	Original release date
763	1	"Fermented Rice Rice Baby"	Chris Santos, Maneet Chauhan, and Elena Besser	October 15, 2024
Ingredients: Appetizer: kouign-amann, raspberry vinaigrette, mixed radishes, monkfish; Entrée: blue hot chili chips, pork chops, kohlrabi, cauliflower hashbrowns; Dessert: fermented rice, sour apple liqueur, red kiwis, creme fraiche; Contestants: Tahiz Gonzalez (eliminated after the appetizer); Eliza Gavin (eliminated after the entrée); Ashten Garrett (eliminated after the dessert); Graham Campbell (winner); Notes: Chef Tahiz cut herself during the appetizer round. Her bandage had to be reapplied at one point. She had lost a considerable amount of time. Chef Eliza had to help with her plate, and the dish was not correctly plated. Though the judges were still able to taste the dish, the plating led to Chef Tahiz’s elimination that round.
764	2	"Big Fat Greek Kitchen"	Amanda Freitag, George Pagonis, and Nilou Motamed	October 22, 2024
Ingredients: Appetizer: evil eye cookies, baby zucchini, sea bream, Greek salad; Entrée: spanakopita spring rolls, escarole, leg of lamb, Greek coffee; Dessert: baklava cheesecake, apricots, mosaiko, cherry spoon fruit; Contestants: Nikolaos Kapernaros (eliminated after the appetizer); Dino Kolitsas (eliminated after the entrée); Christos Bisiotis (eliminated after the dessert); Christina Xenos (winner); Notes: The theme of this episode was Greek food and features Greek chefs.
765	3	"Zhoug-topia"	Kwame Onwuachi, Marc Murphy, and Esther Choi	October 29, 2024
Ingredients: Appetizer: kholodets, cauliflower, Hamachi collar, black sweet corn; Entrée: deep-fried egg yolks, spigarello, Denver steaks, zhoug; Dessert: mooncake, pink lemons, sour candy belts, mushroom water; Contestants: Rachel Bennett (eliminated after the appetizer); Nana Araba Wilmot (eliminated after the entrée); Danny Espinoza (eliminated after the dessert); Tyler “Tai” Davis (winner)
766	4	"Soul Food Showdown"	Marcus Samuelsson, Kardea Brown, and JJ Johnson	February 25, 2025
Ingredients: Appetizer: smoked turkey tails, okra, whiting, chicken & waffles; Entrée: mac & cheese ring, turnip greens, shrimp, southern BBQ potato chips; Dessert: banana pudding moonshine, blackberries, pecans, brown butter cornbread; Contestants: Cynthia Wilson (eliminated after the appetizer); Aaliyah Al-Amin (eliminated after the entrée); Maurice Colbert (eliminated after the dessert); Hoyt Williams (winner); Notes: The theme of this episode was soul food.
767	5	"Snail Caviar Dreams"	Scott Conant, Adrienne Cheatham, and Brian Malarkey	May 13, 2025
Ingredients: Appetizer: snail caviar, candy kale, Asian pears, wolffish filets; Entrée: giant chicharron, Thai peppers, duck confit, ketchup powder; Dessert: tarantulas, graham crackers, pomegranate arils, gianduja; Contestants: Matt McClune (eliminated after the appetizer); Natasha Dupuy (eliminated after the entrée); Tracey Shepos Cenami (eliminated after the dessert); Devan Cunnigham (winner)
768	6	"Carnivore Converter"	Christian Petroni, Chris Santos, and Esther Choi	May 20, 2025
Ingredients: Appetizer: flat cabbage, black garlic, crescent roll dough, spicy mayo; Entrée: potato tots, upland cress, king trumpet mushrooms, cookie butter; Dessert: dehydrated blueberries, smoked olive oil, brownie mix, fruit leather strips; Contestants: Courtney Lindsay (eliminated after the appetizer); Derek Serrano (eliminated after the entrée); Mario Buccellati (eliminated after the dessert); Shibumi Jones (winner); Notes: The chefs have to make vegetarian/meat-free dishes in this episode.
769	7	"Sushi Showdown"	Geoffrey Zakarian, Kate Koo, and Shota Nakajima	May 27, 2025
Ingredients: Appetizer: osechi, yuzu, kanpachi, seaweed-flavored potato chips; Entrée: umeboshi, gai lan, bluefin tuna, sesame seed candy; Dessert: candy sushi, persimmons, cream cheese, uni; Contestants: Taiki Kuramoto (eliminated after the appetizer); Debi Min (eliminated after the entrée); Jae Doan (eliminated after the dessert); Sang Lee (winner)
770	8	"Night Market Madness"	Maneet Chauhan, Jet Tila, and Geoffrey Zakarian	June 10, 2025
Ingredients: Appetizer: takoyaki, mango lassi, langoustines, graffiti eggplant; Entrée: snail soup, taro, Peking duck, elotes; Dessert: egg waffle ice cream cones, watermelon, pandan candy, bug kebabs; Contestants: Jojo Law-Yeone (eliminated after the appetizer); Awo Amenumey (eliminated after the entrée); Kenneth Wan (eliminated after the dessert); Zubair Mohajir (winner)
771	9	"Raclette Racket"	Maneet Chauhan, Alex Guarnaschelli, and Esther Choi	June 17, 2025
Ingredients: Appetizer: raclette, snow peas, glazed ham, ant brittle; Entrée: smoked roe paste, spinach, sumac, camel tenderloin; Dessert: Sapin-sapin, cranberries, cream-filled waffle cones, labneh in oil; Contestants: Ris Allange (eliminated after the appetizer); Courtney Wright (eliminated after the entrée); Christian Gill (eliminated after the dessert); Thomas Clarke (winner)
772	10	"Hot and Hangry"	Manneet Chauhan, Fariyal Abdullahi, and Franco Noriega	June 24, 2025
Ingredients: Appetizer: marry me in chicken, enoki mushrooms, hot links, cottage cheese; Entrée: freeze-dried lemon candies, shisho peppers, Chilean sea bass, 15-hour potatoes; Dessert: cloud bread, cinnamon sticks, apples, hwache; Contestants: Bri Baker (eliminated after the appetizer); Tejas Bleu (eliminated after the entrée); Carolina Gelen (eliminated after the dessert); Christan Willis (winner)
773	11	"A Quail Tale"	Chris Santos, Nilou Motamed, and Joe Sasto	July 1, 2025
Ingredients: Appetizer: francesinha, frozen peas, shaved ribeye & fish sauce; Entrée: tarragon, pompom mushrooms, quail, cezerye; Dessert: dipped madeleines, mangos, duck bacon, honeycomb in a frame; Contestants: Lorna Maseko (eliminated after the appetizer); Ed Lordman (eliminated after the entrée); Chynna Banner (eliminated after the dessert); Jonah Friedmann (winner)
774	12	"Gnocchi Dokey"	Michael Voltaggio, Alex Guarnaschelli, and Shota Nakajima	July 15, 2025
Ingredients: Appetizer: gnocchi in a bread bowl, watermelon radish, canned smoked oysters, black lime powder; Entrée: vegetarian pork, acorn squash, rabbit saddle, pina colada mix; Dessert: crystal candy, lemon verbena, passionfruit paste, guanciale; Contestants: Gus Galvao (eliminated after the appetizer); Byron Hughes III (eliminated after the entrée); Danielle Coombs (eliminated after the dessert); Ade Carrena (winner)
775	13	"Elk or Else!"	Marcus Samuelsson, Nilou Motamed, and Marc Murphy	July 22, 2025
Ingredients: Appetizer: mac & cheese loaf, ginger, cockles, Italian truffle hot sauce; Entrée: sourdough pasta, rainbow Swiss chard, elk rib chop, crunchy Thai peanut sauce; Dessert: ice cream nachos, sapodillas, lavender, bison tallow; Contestants: Shelby Farrell (eliminated after the appetizer); Uri Elbaum (eliminated after the entrée); Fred Fluellen (eliminated after the dessert); Danisia Anderson (winner)

=== Season 61 (2025) ===
No. overall	No. in season	Title	Judges	Original release date
776	1	"Name Your Price: Battle One!"	Scott Conant, Alex Guarnaschelli, and Tiffani Faison	January 7, 2025
Ingredients: Appetizer: canned salmon, ginger beer, niçoise olives; Entrée: ramen-crusted grilled cheese, tri-colored cauliflower, chicken thighs; Dessert: mangos, cookie dough, goat milk caramel; Contestants: Chris Barnum-Dann (eliminated after the appetizer); Taylor Frankel (eliminated after the entrée); Dafne Mejia (eliminated after the dessert); Kendall Ivy (winner); Notes: This was part one of a five-part tournament. In these preliminary battles, each chef starts out w/ $10,000. They use it to buy something for their 4th ingredient. During every auction, the last remaining bidder automatically gets the final item for $1K. The winner keeps their remaining money and advances to the finale. During the first round, Dafne gets lobster, Kendall gets squash blossoms, Taylor gets pickled pig lips, and Chris gets butterscotch pudding. During the second round, Kendall gets truffle carpaccio, Dafne gets rose ice pops and Taylor gets silkworm pupae. During the final round, Dafne gets popcorn cake and Kendall gets canned tomato soup.
777	2	"Name Your Price: Battle Two!"	Scott Conant, Maneet Chauhan, and Amanda Freitag	January 14, 2025
Ingredients: Appetizer: onigiri, chicory, aged balsamic vinegar; Entrée: red bean buns, fennel, venison osso buco; Dessert: marshmallow spread, black garlic, Dubai chocolate bars; Contestants: Mackenzie Milone (eliminated after the appetizer); Alonso Beckford (eliminated after the entrée); Austyn McGroarty (eliminated after the dessert); Emily Lim (winner); Notes: This was part two of a five-part tournament. During the first round, Austyn gets red shrimp, Mackenzie gets wagyu beef tenderloin, Alonso gets BBQ beef intestines and Emily gets natto. During the second round, Austyn gets pasta sheets, Alonso gets ground camel, and Emily gets shiokara. During the final round, Austyn gets strawberry shortcake and Emily gets durian.
778	3	"Name Your Price: Battle Three!"	Geoffrey Zakarian, Alex Guarnaschelli, and Tiffani Faison	January 21, 2025
Ingredients: Appetizer: Japanese fruit sandwiches, purple spinach, tuna loin; Entrée: merguez sausage, leeks, lemon pie filling; Dessert: hoisin sauce, figs, yuca fries; Contestants: Nick Hunter (eliminated after the appetizer); Shibani Mone (eliminated after the entrée); Tucker Ricchio (eliminated after the dessert); Cameron Ingle (winner); Notes: This was part three of a five-part tournament. During the first round, Shibani gets caviar, Tucker gets bacon-wrapped pickles, Nick gets huitlacoche and Cameron gets century egg. During the second round, Shibani gets littleneck clams, Cameron gets Rocky Mountain oysters and Tucker gat lamb's head. During the final round, Tucker gets ube blackberry entremet and Cameron gets uni.
779	4	"Name Your Price: Battle Four!"	Geoffrey Zakarian, Gabe Bertaccini, and Amanda Freitag	January 28, 2025
Ingredients: Appetizer: ham sandwich cake, breakfast radishes, mustard soda; Entrée: cotton candy burrito, Pok choi, veal rib chops; Dessert: scotch, Italian plums, rice paper croissants; Contestants: Lu Breland (eliminated after the appetizer); Josh Hedquist (eliminated after the entrée); Gabriella Baldwin (eliminated after the dessert); Dave White (winner); Notes: This was part four of a five-part tournament. During the first round, Josh gets calamari, Dave gets pork secreto, Gabriella gets sea cucumbers, and Lu gets chocolate covered bugs. During the second round, Gabriella gets blue oyster mushrooms, Dave gets burger meal mix, and Josh gets vanilla frosting. During the final round, Gabriella gets coffee cream pavlova and Dave gets sauerkraut.
780	5	"Name Your Price: Grand Finale!"	Scott Conant, Alex Guarnaschelli, and Gabe Bertaccini	February 4, 2025
Ingredients: Appetizer: alfonsino, upland cress, frozen orange juice; Entrée: fried chicken Bloody Mary, Chinese broccoli, ghost pepper potato chips; Dessert: salted peanut butter cake, concord grapes, fermented pocket cheese; Contestants: Emily Lim (eliminated after the appetizer); Cameron Ingle (eliminated after the entrée); Kendall Ivy (eliminated after the dessert); Dave White (winner); Notes: This was the final part of a five-part tournament. In this episode, everybody had $20,000 at their disposal. The grand champion will win $25,000 in addition to anything left over. During each auction round, the ingredients weren’t all shown just before the bidding began. During the first round, Kendall gets duck prosciutto, Emily gets cacio de pepe doughnuts, Cameron gets cheeseburger in a tube, and Dave gets balut. During the second round, Kendall gets alligator hearts, Dave gets rack of lamb, and Cameron gets pork snout. During the final round, Kendall gets macaron tower and Dave gets braised abalone.
781	6	"Thai Takedown!"	Nilou Motamed, Jazz Singsanong, and Jet Tila	February 11, 2025
Ingredients: Appetizer: khao soi, green papaya, sundried bananas, chicken feet; Entrée: Chor Muang, Thai coriander, prawns, mango sticky rice; Dessert: carved fruit platter, freeze-dried durian, Thai pancakes, Thai tea ice cream; Contestants: Pete Amadhanirundr (eliminated after the appetizer); Kitty Ashi (eliminated after the entrée); Palita Sriratana (eliminated after the dessert); Kasem Saengsawang (winner); Notes: The theme of this episode was Thai food. This episode has Thai chefs competing and each basket has Thai ingredients inspired by the third season of "The White Lotus".
782	7	"Bacon Me Crazy"	Chris Santos, Damaris Phillips, and Martel Stone	February 18, 2025
Ingredients: Appetizer: Heritage Berkshire bacon, hot mustard, cinnamon roll breakfast sandwich, snap peas; Entrée: bacon-wrapped candy apples, pork cheeks, rainbow carrots, pork brains in gravy; Dessert: bacon cake, pork belly, pomegranates, buttermilk; Contestants: Jess Desham Timmons (eliminated after the appetizer); Madeline Sheblessy (eliminated after the entrée); Sy Williams (eliminated after the dessert); Jacob Rios (winner); Notes: The theme of this episode was bacon.
783	8	"Mizuna Matata"	Jet Tila, Alex Guarnaschelli, and Marc Murphy	March 4, 2025
Ingredients: Appetizer: Crab Rangoon pizza, mizuna, salmon filets, cherry drink mix; Entrée: deep-fried spaghetti, mustard greens, teres major, coconut yogurt; Dessert: Sandia Loca, blackberries, buttermilk pancakes, chocolate-covered espresso beans; Contestants: Jen Williams (eliminated after the appetizer); Lee Johnson (eliminated after the entrée); Soleil Ramirez (eliminated after the dessert); Michael Sibert (winner)
784	9	"Sooner or Gator"	Marc Murphy, Alex Guarnaschelli, and Brooke Williamson	March 11, 2025
Ingredients: Appetizer: 7-layer casserole, kohlrabi, tiny ice cream spheres, alligator tenderloin; Entrée: pear-pistachio tart, spinach, boneless leg of lamb, curry paste; Dessert: salted pork fatback, champagne gummi bears, passionfruit, cinnamon sugar pretzels; Contestants: Paul Beatty (eliminated after the appetizer); Sam Ortiz (eliminated after the entrée); Francisco Viñas (eliminated after the dessert); Anya Peters (winner)
785	10	"Midnight Snack Attack"	Chris Santos, Brooke Williamson, and Byron Gomez	March 18, 2025
Ingredients: Appetizer: carne asada tacos, pickles, salsa con queso, instant ramen; Entrée: smashburgers, chicken tenders, potato tots, ghost peppers; Dessert: cheese pizza, blueberries, trail mix, chocolate brownie ice cream; Contestants: Shelby Lewis (eliminated after the appetizer); Shelly Flash (eliminated after the entrée); Lambo Givens (eliminated after the dessert); Merrill Whiston (winner); Notes: Not to be confused with a Season 31 episode of the same.
786	11	"Out for Pork Blood"	Maneet Chauhan, Alex Guarnaschelli, and Ayesha Nurdjaja	March 25, 2025
Ingredients: Appetizer: pandan latte, Italian long hots, pancetta, peaches; Entrée: pork blood, purple spinach, branzino, Kouign-Amann ice cream sandwiches; Dessert: rainbow bagels, longan fruit, pistachio cream, puppy chow; Contestants: Vanessa Ceballos (eliminated after the appetizer); Geoff Ellis (eliminated after the entrée); Phil Hua-Pham (eliminated after the dessert); Meg LaManna (winner)
787	12	"Emu Emergency"	Eric Adjepong, Claudette Zepeda, and Michael Voltaggio	April 1, 2025
Ingredients: Appetizer: ground emu, deep-fried mayonnaise, mache, boxed mac & cheese; Entrée: chicken floss cakes, celtuce, French pork rib rack, white peach ice cream bars; Dessert: dirt soda, sea buckthorn berries, clotted cream, rainbow marshmallows; Contestants: Cintia Dumiense (eliminated after the appetizer); Christian “Eleven” Marcano (eliminated after the entrée); Molly Brandt (eliminated after the dessert); Austin Cobb (winner)
788	13	"Superhero Chefs!"	Amanda Freitag, Marcus Samuelsson, and Tiffani Faison	July 8, 2025
Ingredients: Appetizer: rock candy, corn on the cob, mussels, red bell peppers; Entrée: planet cake pops, kale, skirt steak, whipped coffee; Dessert: gummy snake, sour grapes, gold chocolate coins, deviled eggs; Contestants: Sam Diminich (eliminated after the appetizer); Sera Cuni (eliminated after the entrée); Zach Laidlaw (eliminated after the dessert); Chelsia Ogletree (winner); Notes: The baskets were presented by the stars of the movie Superman. The first basket was presented by David Corenswet, the second basket was presented by Rachel Brosnahan and the third basket was presented by Nicholas Hoult.

=== Season 62 (2025–26) ===
No. overall	No. in season	Title	Judges	Original release date
789	1	"No Kid Hungry"	Marc Murphy, Brooke Williamson, and Cesar Zapata	July 29, 2025
Ingredients: Appetizer: peanut butter packets, strawberries, oatmeal, sausage patties; Entrée: tuna in a can, broccoli, salsa, basmati rice; Dessert: whole chicken, frozen corn, mango fruit leather, teriyaki sauce; Contestants: Micah Klasky (eliminated after the appetizer); Bri Murray (eliminated after the entrée); Amber Williams (eliminated after the dessert); Jermond Booze (winner); Notes: The three rounds (appetizer, entrée, and dessert) were replaced by breakfast, lunch, and dinner. Each chef receives a donation to No Kid Hungry.
790	2	"Dough the Right Thing"	Marcus Samuelsson, Alex Guarnaschelli, and Fariyal Abdullah	August 5, 2025
Ingredients: Appetizer: sour cream creamy ranch dip, hatch chiles, shaved ribeye, hashbrowns; Entrée: pineapple moon cakes, pea greens, duck breast, canned smoked oysters; Dessert: liege waffle dough, limes, candied fennel seeds, banana butter; Contestants: Hanna Haar (eliminated after the appetizer); Brooks Hart (eliminated after the entrée); Asnia Akhtar (eliminated after the dessert); Dominique Shelton (winner)
791	3	"Hawaiian Paradise"	Michael Voltaggio, Lee Anne Wong, and Tiffani Faison	August 12, 2025
Ingredients: Appetizer: pork and chicken laulau, Kona coffee ice cream, avocados, chili pepper water; Entrée: butter mochi, ‘Uala, ono fillets, dried Hawaiian seaweed; Dessert: canned spiced ham, pineapple, violet mints, passionfruit puree; Contestants: Robin Abad (eliminated after the appetizer); Kristene Moon (eliminated after the entrée); Jon Matsubara (eliminated after the dessert); Jojo Vasquez (winner)
792	4	"In Cod We Trust?"	Chris Santos, Alex Guarnaschelli, and Fariyal Abdullahi	August 19, 2025
Ingredients: Appetizer: pickles in mustard sauce, enoki mushrooms, cod fillets, roasted marrow bones; Entrée: cottage cheese, bitter melon, New York strip steaks, tea eggs; Dessert: rainbow cookie cake, Asian pears, white chocolate chips, strawberry sauce; Contestants: Alex White (eliminated after the appetizer); Bria Downey (eliminated after the entrée); Sommer Sellers (eliminated after the dessert); Daniel Lipson (winner)
793	5	"Seoul Searching"	Alyse Whitney, Esther Choi, and Chris Oh	August 26, 2025
Ingredients: Appetizer: jokbal, cucumber kimchi, canned mackerel, Yuja compote; Entrée: Korean fried chicken, eggplant, Korean short ribs, sweet potato noodles; Dessert: bungeoppang, persimmons, Korean corndogs, strawberry milk; Contestants: Jun Shim (eliminated after the appetizer); Losa Yi (eliminated after the entrée); Eric Jaeho Choi (eliminated after the dessert); Emma Woods (winner)
794	6	"Fluke Rebuke"	Scott Conant, Adrienne Cheatham, and Brian Malarkey	March 17, 2026
Ingredients: Appetizer: gummy fruit cereal, zucchini, fluke filets, Tasso ham; Entrée: watermelon sandwich, asparagus, chuck roast, mint yogurt soda; Dessert: crepe flower, mangosteens, peelable banana candy, long peppers; Contestants: Kelseay Dukae (eliminated after the appetizer); Sal Nicotera (eliminated after the entrée); D’Angelo Mobley (eliminated after the dessert); Kristy Flores (winner)
795	7	"Ted's Takeover"	Ted Allen, Tiffani Faison, Geoffrey Zakarian, and Amanda Freitag	March 24, 2026
Ingredients: Appetizer: cheeseburger in a tube, green beans, spiral ham, sour cream and onion chips; Entrée: Thai curry, radicchio, skirt steak, Alaskan king crab; Dessert: white peaches, bourbon fennel dried chiles, durian extract, tiramisu; Contestants: Mary Mendoza (eliminated after the appetizer); Chris Viaud (eliminated after the entrée); Drew Keane (eliminated after the dessert); Rasheeda Woolley (winner); Notes: This is the second episode to feature only four judges instead of the usual three so the contestants had to make five plates instead of the usual four.
796	8	"Venison Valor"	Brian Malarkey, Maneet Chauhan, and Esther Choi	March 31, 2026
Ingredients: Appetizer: fruit cocktail, basil, venison strip steak, onion rings; Entrée: pho soup dumplings, Brussels sprouts on the stalk, salmon, yuzu mayo; Dessert: BBQ potato chips, plums, stone ground Mexican chocolate, croissant dough; Contestants: Leaha Brewer (eliminated after the appetizer); Sid Aduri (eliminated after the entrée); Daya Myers (eliminated after the dessert); Joon Ryu (winner)
797	9	"African Soul"	Marcus Samuelsson, Fariyal Abdullahi, and Eric Adjepong	April 7, 2026
Ingredients: Appetizer: jallof rice, okra, saltfish, berbere; Entrée: egusi soup mix, yuca, goat chops, groundnuts; Dessert: injera, plantains, dawadawa, dark chocolate; Contestants: Prince Lobo (eliminated after the appetizer); Matthew Raiford (eliminated after the entrée); Niema DiGrazia (eliminated after the dessert); Danielle Harris (winner)
798	10	"Eggscuse Me"	Eddie Jackson, Tiffani Faison, and Julian Rodarte	April 14, 2026
Ingredients: Appetizer: caviar, quail eggs, smoked salmon, Tokyo scallions; Entrée: salted egg yolk syrup, duck eggs, collards, Mexican chorizo; Dessert: ostrich egg, chocolate caramel eggs, strawberries, ladyfingers; Contestants: Alexis Conley (eliminated after the appetizer); Hari Pulapaka (eliminated after the entrée); Mari Katsumura (eliminated after the dessert); Ivan Barros (winner)
799	11	"Indigenous Inspiration"	Eric Adjepong, Pyet DeSpain, and Sean Sherman	April 21, 2026
Ingredients: Appetizer: staghorn sumac, pawpaw pulp, whitefish, kahsherhon:ni; Entrée: sweet corn ice cream sandwiches, lima beans, bison ribeye, dried Anaheim chiles; Dessert: pemmican, Saskatoon berries, sweet potatoes, stone-milled whole wheat flour; Contestants: Jessica Walks First (eliminated after the appetizer); Ray Naranjo (eliminated after the entrée); Mariah Gladstone (eliminated after the dessert); Justin Pioche (winner)
800	12	"Sea Bean Bonanza"	Maneet Chauhan, Marcus Samuelsson, and Kardea Brown	April 28, 2026
Ingredients: Appetizer: tuna salad, sea beans, shrimp, dried pineapple rings; Entrée: funnel cake tacos, lacy cauliflower, lamb shoulder, cornichons; Dessert: cereal milk whipped cream, starfruit, chicharrónes de harina, grenadine; Contestants: Trimell Hawkins (eliminated after the appetizer); Angelique Robinson (eliminated after the entrée); Ilji Cheung (eliminated after the dessert); Bryan Giron (winner)
801	13	"Leftovers Gone Wild!"	Gabe Bertaccini, Alex Guarnaschelli, and Aarti Sequeira	May 5, 2026
Ingredients: Appetizer: leftover grilled hotdogs, leftover vegetable slaw, leftover tzatziki, leftover rice & beans; Entrée: leftover chicken parmesan, mirepoix scraps, watermelon, leftover pasta salad; Dessert: leftover birthday cake, crumbled wafer cookies, leftover fruit platter, melted cola slushy; Contestants: Maia Domingues (eliminated after the appetizer); Nadav Greenberg (eliminated after the entrée); Peter Ali (eliminated after the dessert); Leigh Orleans (winner)

== Specials ==
=== Food Networks Stars! (2012) ===
No. overall	No. in season	Title	Judges	Original release date
S1	TBA	"Food Network Stars!"	Alton Brown, Giada De Laurentiis, and Bobby Flay	July 22, 2012
Ingredients: Appetizer: smoked kippers, hard boiled eggs, treviso, sparkling cider; Entrée: black chicken, escarole, cream of coconut, guava; Dessert: fenugreek, cinnamon toast cereal, Japanese mayonnaise, frozen peas; Contestants: Jeff Mauro (TNFNS season 7 winner) (Sandwich King) (Charity: Opportunity Knocks – River Forest, IL) (eliminated after the appetizer); Amy Finley (TNFNS season 3 winner) (The Gourmet Next Door) (Charity: The Lois Merrill Foundation – San Diego, CA) (eliminated after the entrée); Melissa d'Arabian (TNFNS season 5 winner) (Ten Dollar Dinners) (Charity: American Foundation for Suicide Prevention – New York, NY) (eliminated after the dessert); Aarti Sequeira (TNFNS season 6 winner) (Aarti Party) (Charity: Central City Community Outreach – Los Angeles, CA) (winner); Notes: This episode featured four contestants that were previous winners of Food Network Star that were competing for $10,000 for the charity of their choice. The judges were the mentors for Season 8 of Food Network Star.

=== Grill Masters Tournament (2012) ===
No. overall	No. in season	Title	Judges	Original release date
S2	TBA	"Grill Masters: Part One"	Aarón Sánchez, Amanda Freitag, and Marc Murphy	July 22, 2012
Ingredients: Appetizer: yak steaks, mesquite syrup, peanut butter sandwich cookies, Tuscan kale; Entrée: California halibut, sauerkraut, frozen french fries, Mexican chorizo; Dessert: oil-cured black olives, peaches, piloncillo, chocolate graham cracker pies; Contestants: Jennifer Duncan, Caterer and Competitive Barbecue Champion, Whiskey Ranch BBQ/Pitmaster, Smoked To The Bone BBQ Team, Gilbert, AZ (eliminated after the appetizer); Tommy Duncan, Caterer and Competitive Barbecue Champion, Whiskey Ranch BBQ, Gilbert, AZ (eliminated after the entrée); Galen Zamarra, Chef and Restaurateur, Mas (Farmhouse), New York, NY (eliminated after the dessert); Ray "Dr. BBQ" Lampe, Competitive Barbecue Champion, St. Petersburg, FL (advances to final round) (winner); Notes: This was the first Chopped Grill Masters tournament ever. This is part 1 of a 5 episode series of episodes, where sixteen "pro" grillers competed. The winner of each preliminary round advanced to the finale, where they competed for $50,000. The "Grill Masters" episodes were taped outdoors at Old Tucson Studios near Tucson, AZ. Jennifer and Tommy Duncan are husband and wife. The yak steaks in the first basket appeared to be top sirloin steaks.
S3	TBA	"Grill Masters: Part Two"	Aarón Sánchez, Amanda Freitag, and Marc Murphy	July 29, 2012
Ingredients: Appetizer: Hawaiian blue prawns, tomatillos, chayotes, hatch chile taffy; Entrée: rack of wild boar, cactus flower buds, spoon fruit, portabella mushrooms; Dessert: cactus pears, Italian wafer cookies, goat's milk ricotta, single malt whiskey; Contestants: Carey Bringle, Owner and Barbecue Pitmaster, Peg Leg Porker, Nashville, TN (eliminated after the appetizer); Dushyant Singh, Executive Sous chef, Wild Horse Pass Resort and Spa, Phoenix, AZ (eliminated after the entrée); Nicole Davenport, Chef and Restaurateur, Sugar and Smoke, Fredericksburg, TX (eliminated after the dessert); Sam Choy, Chef and Restaurateur, Kawaii, HI (advances to final round) (winner); Notes: This is part 2 of 5.
S4	TBA	"Grill Masters: Part Three"	Aarón Sánchez, Amanda Freitag, and Marc Murphy	August 5, 2012
Ingredients: Appetizer: oysters, hearts of palm, creamed spinach, duck bacon; Entrée: rabbit, eggplant, pineapple, puff pastry dough; Dessert: Meyer lemons, marshmallows, charcoal biscuits, zucchini; Contestants: Robyn Lindars, Chef and Blogger, "Grill Grrrl" food blog, Miami, FL (eliminated after the appetizer); Timothy Grandinetti, Chef and Restaurateur, Spring House Restaurant, Kitchen & Bar, Winston-Salem, NC (eliminated after the entrée); Doug Keiles, Competitive Barbecue Champion and Pitmaster, Ribs Within BBQ Team, Hillsbourough, NJ (eliminated after the dessert); Ernest Servantes, Executive Chef, Texas Lutheran University/Barbecue Pitmaster, Burnt Bean Co., New Braunfels, TX (advances to final round) (winner); Notes: This is part 3 of 5.
S5	TBA	"Grill Masters: Part Four"	Aarón Sánchez, Amanda Freitag, and Marc Murphy	August 12, 2012
Ingredients: Appetizer: short ribs, watermelon, speculoos, fennel; Entrée: pork butt, baked beans, clams, strawberry fruit leather; Dessert: tofu, green plantains, maple-bacon ale, mangoes; Contestants: Chad Ward, Competitive Barbecue Champion, Whiskey Bent BBQ, Lakeland, FL (eliminated after the appetizer); Corinne Trang, Chef and Educator, Westport, CT (eliminated after the entrée); Rick Browne, Chef and Author, Seattle, WA (eliminated after the dessert); Kent Rollins, Cook and Chuckwagon Owner, Red River Ranch Chuck Wagon, Byers, TX (advances to final round) (winner); Notes: This is part 4 of 5.
S6	TBA	"Grill Masters: Finale"	Aarón Sánchez, Amanda Freitag, and Marc Murphy	August 19, 2012
Ingredients: Appetizer: sardines, corn on the cob, xtabentun, canned sloppy joe filling; Entrée: standing rib roast, guava paste, smoked mozzarella, bok choy; Dessert: quail eggs, pound cake, whole coconut, strawberry cream tequila; Contestants: Ray "Dr. BBQ" Lampe, Competitive Barbecue Champion, St. Petersburg, FL (eliminated after the appetizer); Sam Choy, Chef and Restaurateur, Kawaii, HI (eliminated after the entrée); Kent Rollins, Cook and Chuckwagon Owner, Red River Ranch Chuck Wagon, Byers, TX (eliminated after the dessert); Ernest Servantes, Executive Chef, Texas Lutheran University/Barbecue Pitmaster, Burnt Bean Co., New Braunfels, TX (winner); Notes: This is the final part of the tournament. The 4 preliminary round winners competed for the $50,000 grand prize.

=== Grill Masters Tournament (2015) ===
No. overall	No. in season	Title	Judges	Original release date
S7	TBA	"Grill Masters: Episode One"	Chris Santos, Amy Mills, and Scott Conant	July 14, 2015
Ingredients: Appetizer: double cut pork chops, margarita, avocados, merguez sausage; Entrée: artichokes, cherry pie, rye whiskey, cowboy steaks; Dessert: ham steaks, mangos, corn bread, ricotta cheese; Contestants: Staci Graves Jett, Caterer & BBQ Pit Master, Hog Heaven, Brooksville, KY (eliminated after the appetizer); Randy Pauly, Firefighter & BBQ Pit Champ, Holy Cow Cookers, Pearland, TX (eliminated after the entrée); Danielle Dimovski, Competitive BBQ Champ, Diva Q BBQ, Barrie, Ontario, Canada (eliminated after the dessert); Chris Hart, Competitive BBQ Champ & Author, Wicked Good Barbecue, Boston, MA (winner); Notes: This is the second grill masters tournament, taking place a few years after the first one, and in a different location: Queens County Farm in Queens, New York. This tournament would kick start an annual, summer competition special for every year after this one. Just like the first tournament, there are 5 episodes, with 4 episodes being preliminary rounds and the winners of all four rounds competing in the finale for a $50,000 prize. Chef Chris forgot the ricotta in round 3, but was given the win based on the performance of his entire meal.
S8	TBA	"Grill Masters: Episode Two"	Tim Love, Alex Guarnaschelli, and Scott Conant	July 21, 2015
Ingredients: Appetizer: hamburger patties, salsa con queso, zucchini, hot dogs; Entrée: rack of elk, Worcestershire sauce, deviled eggs, collard greens; Dessert: acorn squash, chocolate cupcakes, bananas, ras el hanout; Contestants: Candy Sue Weaver, Competitive BBQ Champ, BBQ Delight, Pine Bluff, AR (eliminated after the appetizer); Matty Melehes, Chef de Cuisine, Q Roadhouse Brewing Co., Jackson, WY (eliminated after the entrée); Mary Brent "M.B." Galyean, Expedition Chef, Charleston, WV (eliminated after the dessert); Stan Hays, Pit Master, County Line Smokers, Pleasant Hill, MO (winner); Notes: Part 2 of a 5 part series. While Chopped normally obscures brand names, the Worcestershire sauce in the second round is a product of tournament sponsor Lea & Perrins.
S9	TBA	"Grill Masters: Episode Three"	Tim Love, Alex Guarnaschelli, and Scott Conant	July 28, 2015
Ingredients: Appetizer: Spanish red shrimp, feta cheese, asparagus, brisket ice cream; Entrée: lobsters, carrot ketchup, dandelion greens, cheese and jalapeño sausage; Dessert: fruit skewers, quick pan popcorn, amaretto, panatone; Contestants: Donna Fong, Competitive BBQ Champ, Butcher's Daughter BBQ, Alameda, CA (eliminated after the appetizer); Tom Spaulding, Live Fire Catering, 1843 Live Fire Catering, Austin, TX (eliminated after the entrée); Harry Soo, Competitive BBQ Champ, Slap Yo' Daddy BBQ, Los Angeles, CA (eliminated after the dessert); Leslie Roark Scott, Competitive BBQ Champ & Chef, Ubon's, Yazoo City, MS (winner); Notes: Part 3 of a 5-part series. The fruit skewers included purple grapes, pineapple, strawberries, and cantaloupe. Donna and Harry were engaged at the time of filming. Chef Leslie's son, Jacob, would later compete on Chopped Junior: Make Me A Judge, Episode 2.
S10	TBA	"Grill Masters: Episode Four"	Chris Santos, Amy Mills, and Scott Conant	August 4, 2015
Ingredients: Appetizer: spare ribs, rhubarb, fava beans, black-eyed pea cakes; Entrée: monchong, ramps, macadamia nuts, Galia melon; Dessert: plums, halloumi cheese, poor man's toffee, white BBQ sauce; Contestants: Phil Johnson, Food Truck Owner, Sammitch's, Phoenix, AZ (eliminated after the appetizer); Ash Fulk, Chef & Culinary Director, Hill Country Barbecue Market, New York, NY (eliminated after the entrée); Mike Davis, BBQ Pit Master, Delight, AR (eliminated after the dessert); Angie Mar, Executive Chef, Beatrice Inn, New York, NY (winner); Notes: Part 4 of a 5 part series.
S11	TBA	"Grill Masters: Episode Five"	Chris Santos, Alex Guarnaschelli, and Scott Conant	August 11, 2015
Ingredients: Appetizer: rattlesnake meat, lemonade iced tea, Japanese eggplant, hushpuppies; Entrée: goat, rainbow carrots, watermelon, kokoretsi; Dessert: dragonfruit, pancakes, lemon meringue pie, jalapeños; Contestants: Leslie Roark Scott, Competitive BBQ Champ & Chef, Ubon's, Yazoo City, MS (eliminated after the appetizer); Chris Hart, Competitive BBQ Champ & Author, Boston, MA (eliminated after the entrée); Stan Hays, Pit Master, County Line Smokers, Pleasant Hill, MO (eliminated after the dessert); Angie Mar, Executive Chef, Beatrice Inn, New York, NY (winner); Notes: The final part of a 5 part series, in which the winner earned $50,000. The contestants were given 40 minutes in the entree round rather than the usual 30 to allow proper time to prep the goat.

=== Chopped: Impossible (2015) ===
No. overall	No. in season	Title	Judges	Original release date
S12	TBA	"Chopped: Impossible, Part 1"	Chris Santos, Alex Guarnaschelli, and Robert Irvine	October 22, 2015
Ingredients: Appetizer: hamburger Bloody Mary, beef fajita meat, whipped topping, flying fish eggs; Entrée: mackerel, edible flowers, durian cookies, pork stomach in soy; Dessert: Welsh rarebit, apple teeth, nacho cheese tortilla chips, gumdrops; Contestants: Barry Frish (Episode 15.11 – "Take Heart") (eliminated after the appetizer); Diane Dimeo (Episode 2.9 – "Buckwheat Blunders and Twists of Fate") and (Episode 2.13 – "Chopped Champions, Round Four: Bring It!") (eliminated after the entrée); Roxanne Spruance (Episode 18.10 – "Bacon Baskets!") (eliminated after the dessert); Marc Anthony Bynum (Episode 4.8 – "Quahog Quandaries and Pickle Puzzles"), (Episode 5.5 – "$50,000 Tournament: Round Two") and (Episode 5.8 – "$50,000 Tournament: Grand Finale") (advances to final round) (winner); Notes: Part one of a four-part tournament. Four returning Chopped Champions face off for a spot in the finale for a chance to win a grand prize of up to $40,000. Diane Dimeo was also in the first Chopped Champions event in season 2, and Marc Anthony Bynum was a finalist in the second Chopped Champions event in season 5. The edible flowers in the entree round included pansies, snapdragons, and nasturtiums. The apple teeth in the dessert round were made from apple slices, peanut butter, and marshmallows.
S13	TBA	"Chopped: Impossible, Part 2"	Geoffrey Zakarian, Maneet Chauhan, and Robert Irvine	October 29, 2015
Ingredients: Appetizer: salted duck, dried olives, green gelatin, prosciutto; Entrée: chicken in a can, corn cob jelly, crayfish, sweet lemons; Dessert: ostrich egg, chunky peanut butter, meat lover's sub sandwich, balsamic vinegar; Contestants: Robyn Almodovar (Episode 24.6 – "Tendon Intentions") (eliminated after the appetizer); Timothy Peterson (Episode 22.6 – "Bizarre Baskets") (eliminated after the entrée); Nong Poonsukwattana (Episode 21.6 – "Food Truck Fight") (eliminated after the dessert); James Major (Episode 15.8 – "Big Hitters") (advances to final round) (winner); Notes: Part two of a four-part tournament. Four returning Chopped Champions face off for a spot in the finale. A hammer and screwdriver was provided in the dessert basket to help the chefs crack open the ostrich egg.
S14	TBA	"Chopped: Impossible, Part 3"	Geoffrey Zakarian, Aarón Sánchez, and Robert Irvine	November 5, 2015
Ingredients: Appetizer: alligator, zucchini blossoms, guacamole with roasted crickets, cricket flour; Entrée: skate wing, fiddlehead ferns, 100-year-old eggs, yellow marshmallow chicks; Dessert: dessert sushi plate, vanilla ice cream, black garlic, brown bananas; Contestants: Leslie Roark Scott (Episode 24.16 – "Grill Masters: Episode Three") and (Episode 24.18 – "Grill Masters: Episode Five") (eliminated after the appetizer); Jonathan Kavourakis (Episode 23.9 – "Let's Do Lunch") (eliminated after the entrée); Antonio Mure (Episode 17.10 – "Competition Italiano") (eliminated after the dessert); Emily Chapman (Episode 21.13 – "Money Saver") (advances to final round) (winner); Notes: Part three of a four-part tournament. Four returning Chopped Champions face off for a spot in the finale. Leslie Roark Scott was a finalist in the 2015 Chopped Grill Masters Tournament.
S15	TBA	"Chopped: Impossible, Grand Finale"	Scott Conant, Aarón Sánchez, and Amanda Freitag	November 12, 2015
Ingredients: Appetizer: geoduck, spring garlic, purple artichokes, fish fillet sandwich; Entrée: fried pork brain sandwiches, dried pomegranate seeds, chocolate mint, spaghetti rings; Dessert: (second entrée round) cow tongue, cow feet, beef jerky soda, chateaubriand; Contestants: Marc Anthony Bynum (Episode 4.8 – "Quahog Quandaries and Pickle Puzzles"), (Episode 5.5 – "$50,000 Tournament: Round Two") and (Episode 5.8 – "$50,000 Tournament: Grand Finale") (eliminated after the appetizer); James Major (Episode 15.8 – "Big Hitters") (eliminated after the entrée); Robert Irvine (eliminated after the dessert); Emily Chapman (Episode 21.13 – "Money Saver") (winner); Notes: Part four of a four-part tournament. Winners of the three previous episodes faced off for $15,000 in two rounds: appetizer and entree. Judging after the second round held both the first and second rounds in consideration to determine the tournament winner. In the third round, the winner faced celebrity chef Robert Irvine in an additional entrée round for a chance to increase the winnings from $15,000 to $40,000. This is the first episode where three chefs compete in the Appetizer round and the two chefs compete in the Entree round.

=== Secrets of Winning (2015) ===
No. overall	No. in season	Title	Judges	Original release date
S16	TBA	"Secrets of Winning"	N/A, N/A, and N/A	December 22, 2015
Ingredients: Appetizer: N/A; Entrée: N/A; Dessert: N/A; Contestants: N/A (eliminated after the appetizer); N/A (eliminated after the entrée); N/A (eliminated after the dessert); N/A (winner); Notes: Compilation episode featuring highlights from the first 26 seasons (and the Chopped: After Hours web series), along with tips on competing in the Chopped kitchen.

=== Grill Masters Napa (2016) ===
No. overall	No. in season	Title	Judges	Original release date
S17	TBA	"Grill Masters Napa: Part 1"	Marc Murphy, Amanda Freitag, and Michael Chiarello	July 5, 2016
Ingredients: Appetizer: octopus, fruit pops, purple cauliflower, Italian sausage; Entrée: veal chops, pickled smoked okra, watermelon radish, nachos; Dessert: honey gelato cones, petimezi, pineapple, Anaheim chiles; Contestants: Bryan Moscatello, Executive Chef, Calistoga Ranch, Saint Helena, CA (eliminated after the appetizer); Ashley Pado, Corporate Chef, Certified Angus Beef® Brand, Wooster, OH (eliminated after the entrée); Chad Rosenthal, Chef & Restaurateur, The Lucky Well, Ambler, PA (eliminated after the dessert); Jonathon Sawyer, Chef & Restaurateur, The Greenhouse Tavern, Trentina and Noodlecat, Cleveland, OH (winner); Notes: This is the third summer grilling tournament. This time around, the winner of the first episode received $10,000 and a spot in the $50,000 grand finale. The tournament was held at Beringer Vineyards in Napa Valley, California. Instead of an oven and stove, contestants were provided with a gas grill, charcoal grill, and smoker. In addition, some other equipment such as a blast chiller and ice cream machine were not available.
S18	TBA	"Grill Masters Napa: Part 2"	Marc Murphy, Amanda Freitag, and Michael Chiarello	July 12, 2016
Ingredients: Appetizer: lamb belly, baked beans, flatbread dough, grilled grapefruit; Entrée: sea urchin, reginelle, leeks, side of halibut; Dessert: cinnamon rolls, spicy tamarind candies, marshmallows, strawberries; Contestants: Nate Berrigan-Dunlop, Executive Chef, Penrose Restaurant, Oakland, CA (eliminated after the appetizer); Karen Mitchell, Executive Chef, Palm Restaurant, Boston, MA (eliminated after the entrée); Christopher Schobel, Chef & Restaurateur, Fat Daddy's Smokehouse, Kihei, HI (eliminated after the dessert); Sophina Uong, Executive Chef, Revival Bar & Kitchen, Berkeley, CA (winner); Notes: Part 2 of a 5 part tournament. The winner received $10,000 and a spot in the $50,000 grand finale. While Chopped normally obscures brand names, the baked beans in the first basket were Bush's Smokehouse Tradition Grillin' Beans - a product of a Chopped sponsor.
S19	TBA	"Grill Masters Napa: Part 3"	Marc Murphy, Amanda Freitag, and John Koch	July 19, 2016
Ingredients: Appetizer: abalone, rainbow chard, spa water, raisins on-the-vine; Entrée: bone-in natural cut ribeye steak, toybox eggplant, Padrón peppers, polenta log; Dessert: chocolate trifle, poached pears, slab bacon, pistachios in the shell; Contestants: Charles Grund, Corporate Chef, Hill Country Barbecue Market, New York, NY (eliminated after the appetizer); Brian Bruns, Executive Sous Chef, Spiaggia Restaurant & Café, Chicago, IL (eliminated after the entrée); Jason Bergeron, Executive Chef, Tavistock Restaurant Collection, San Francisco, CA (eliminated after the dessert); Daniel Gomez Sanchez, Executive Sous Chef, La Toque, Napa, CA (winner); Notes: Part 3 of a 5 part tournament. Due to the extensive time required to prepare abalone, the abalone in the first basket was cleaned ahead of time. To save time in the third round, both chefs agreed to use pre-shelled pistachios from the pantry instead of ones from the basket; the judges permitted this since both chefs had the same advantage.
S20	TBA	"Grill Masters Napa: Part 4"	Marc Murphy, Amanda Freitag, and Geoffrey Zakarian	July 26, 2016
Ingredients: Appetizer: tri-tip, hen of the woods mushrooms, avocados, rose petal confit; Entrée: red snapper, grape leaves, Meyer lemonade, beets; Dessert: olive oil cake, cheddar cheese, gala apples, salted caramel; Contestants: Ken Hess, Chef & Pitmaster, Big Bob Gibson Bar-B-Q, Decatur, AL (eliminated after the appetizer); Tracy Anderson, Pitmaster & Owner, Woodhouse BBQ, Napa, CA (eliminated after the entrée); Chrissy Camba, Chef & Owner, Maddy's Dumpling House, Chicago, IL (eliminated after the dessert); Tony Maws, Chef & Restaurateur, Craigie on Main/Kirkland Tap and Trotter, Cambridge/Somerville, MA (winner); Notes: Part 4 of a 5 part tournament. While Chopped normally obscures brand names, the cheddar cheese in the third basket was Sargento 4 State Cheddar - a product of a Chopped sponsor.
S21	TBA	"Grill Masters Napa: Grand Finale"	Marc Murphy, Amanda Freitag, and Geoffrey Zakarian	August 2, 2016
Ingredients: Appetizer: pig head, smoked chocolate chips, home-made blue corn tortillas, escarole; Entrée: porterhouse, candied garlic, artichoke, razor clams; Dessert: chocolate babka, aged goat cheese, Cabernet Sauvignon, bananas; Contestants: Tony Maws, Chef & Restaurateur, Craigie on Main/Kirkland Tap and Trotter, Cambridge/Somerville, MA (eliminated after the appetizer); Jonathon Sawyer, Chef & Restaurateur, The Greenhouse Tavern, Trentina and Noodlecat, Cleveland, OH (eliminated after the entrée); Daniel Gomez Sanchez, Executive Sous Chef, La Toque, Napa, CA (eliminated after the dessert); Sophina Uong, Executive Chef, Revival Bar & Kitchen, Berkeley, CA (winner); Notes: Last part of the 5 part tournament. The winners of the four previous episodes competed for an additional $50,000. The tortillas in the first basket were given to the chefs as uncooked masa. While Chopped normally obscures brand names, the Cabernet Sauvignon in the third basket was a product of tournament sponsor and host Beringer Vineyards.

=== Grill Masters Tournament (2017) ===
No. overall	No. in season	Title	Judges	Original release date
S22	TBA	"Grill Masters: Battle 1"	Marc Murphy, Alex Guarnaschelli, and Myron Mixon	August 1, 2017
Ingredients: Appetizer: Pork shoulder, rainbow chard, Cabernet Sauvignon, watermelon pie; Entrée: Bloody Mary ice pops, beef ribs, vegan lobster, petit vegetable crudites; Dessert: Brownie batter, sweet plantains, strawberries, uni; Contestants: Lori Frazee (eliminated after the appetizer); Craig Verhage (eliminated after the entrée); Andy Husbands (eliminated after the dessert); Megan Day (winner); Notes: Part 1 of a 5 part grilling tournament featuring 16 pro grillers. The winner of each preliminary round advanced to the finals to compete for $50,000 and a trip for 2 to Beringer Vineyards in Napa Valley, California. Like past grilling tournaments, this was an outdoor competition where the chefs had to grill. Filming returned to Queens County Farm for this year's tournament. While Chopped normally obscures brand names, the Cabernet Sauvignon in the first basket was a product of tournament sponsor Beringer Vineyards. Chef Andy competed on Season 6 of Gordon Ramsay's Hell's Kitchen in 2009, finishing in 8th place.
S23	TBA	"Grill Masters: Battle 2"	Scott Conant, Tiffani Faison, and Marc Murphy	August 8, 2017
Ingredients: Appetizer: Stuffed trotters, fennel, smoked water, razor clams; Entrée: Rabbit saddle, celery snowflake leaves, purple artichokes, pork belly; Dessert: Bush's Honey Chipotle Grillin’ Beans, red velvet whoopie pies, cape gooseberries, pig's ear pastries; Contestants: Richard Fergola (eliminated after the appetizer); Jeff Bannister (eliminated after the entrée); Ro Daniel (eliminated after the dessert); Joe Johnson (winner); Notes: Part 2 of 5. Chopped normally obscures brand names but the third basket specifically identified Bush's baked beans, a sponsor of the tournament.
S24	TBA	"Grill Masters: Battle 3"	Marc Murphy, Alex Guarnaschelli, and Marcus Samuelsson	August 15, 2017
Ingredients: Appetizer: Bison t-bone steaks, Sargento provolone, blue masa dough, frozen daiquiri; Entrée: Duck breast, haricot verts, sushi, ash ice cream; Dessert: Birthday cake, lardo, Meyer lemons, candy fruit kabobs; Contestants: Lee Ann Whippen (eliminated after the appetizer); Moe "Big Moe" Cason (eliminated after the entrée); Flip Wise (eliminated after the dessert); Stephen Coe (winner); Notes: Part 3 of 5. Chopped normally obscures brand names but the first basket features Sargento cheese, a longtime sponsor of Chopped.
S25	TBA	"Grill Masters: Battle 4"	Chris Santos, Maneet Chauhan, and Aaron Franklin	August 22, 2017
Ingredients: Appetizer: Lamb loin chops, habaneros, Okinawa sweet potatoes, mezcal; Entrée: Boneless rib-eye roast, Romanesco cauliflower steaks, morel mushrooms, onion candy; Dessert: Churros, mesquite powder, Scamorza cheese, dragon fruit; Contestants: Marco Niccoli (eliminated after the appetizer); Nikki Martin (eliminated after the entrée); Joanna Dunn (eliminated after the dessert); Jim "Big Jim" Stancil (winner); Notes: Part 4 of 5. While Chopped normally obscures brand names, the lamb loin chops in the first basket were provided by tournament sponsor Walmart. Chef Joanna competed on Season 3 of Gordon Ramsay's Hell's Kitchen in 2007, finishing in 9th place.
S26	TBA	"Grill Masters: Finale Battle"	Marc Murphy, Amanda Freitag, and Chris Santos	August 29, 2017
Ingredients: Appetizer: Rack of wild boar, grilled French toast packets, pickled carrots, cerveza pequena; Entrée: Venison leg, fiddlehead ferns, heirloom tomatoes, s’mores skillet; Dessert: Deep-fried margaritas, starfruit, giant gummy bear, corn chips; Contestants: Jim "Big Jim" Stancil (eliminated after the appetizer); Megan Day (eliminated after the entrée); Stephen Coe (eliminated after the dessert); Joe Johnson (winner); Notes: Part 5 of 5; the finale. The qualifying chefs competed for $50,000 and a trip for 2 to Beringer Vineyards in Napa Valley, CA.

=== Just Desserts (2018) ===
No. overall	No. in season	Title	Judges	Original release date
S27	TBA	"Just Desserts: $50,000 Desserts"	N/A, N/A, and N/A	TBA
Ingredients: Appetizer: N/A; Entrée: N/A; Dessert: N/A; Contestants: N/A (eliminated after the appetizer); N/A (eliminated after the entrée); N/A (eliminated after the dessert); N/A (winner); Notes: Compilation episode featuring highlights from five dessert rounds from previously-aired episodes.
S28	TBA	"Just Desserts: All-Stars"	N/A, N/A, and N/A	June 4, 2018
Ingredients: Appetizer: N/A; Entrée: N/A; Dessert: N/A; Contestants: N/A (eliminated after the appetizer); N/A (eliminated after the entrée); N/A (eliminated after the dessert); N/A (winner); Notes: Compilation episode featuring highlights from five dessert rounds from previously-aired episodes.
S29	TBA	"Just Desserts: Outrageous Baskets"	N/A, N/A, and N/A	June 25, 2018
Ingredients: Appetizer: N/A; Entrée: N/A; Dessert: N/A; Contestants: N/A (eliminated after the appetizer); N/A (eliminated after the entrée); N/A (eliminated after the dessert); N/A (winner); Notes: Compilation episode featuring highlights from five dessert rounds from previously-aired episodes.
S30	TBA	"Just Desserts: Dessert Dream Teams"	N/A, N/A, and N/A	June 25, 2018
Ingredients: Appetizer: N/A; Entrée: N/A; Dessert: N/A; Contestants: N/A (eliminated after the appetizer); N/A (eliminated after the entrée); N/A (eliminated after the dessert); N/A (winner); Notes: Compilation episode featuring highlights from five dessert rounds from previously-aired episodes.
S31	TBA	"Just Desserts: Redemption Wars"	N/A, N/A, and N/A	TBA
Ingredients: Appetizer: N/A; Entrée: N/A; Dessert: N/A; Contestants: N/A (eliminated after the appetizer); N/A (eliminated after the entrée); N/A (eliminated after the dessert); N/A (winner); Notes: Compilation episode featuring highlights from five dessert rounds from previously-aired episodes.
S32	TBA	"Just Desserts: Viewers' Choice Baskets"	N/A, N/A, and N/A	TBA
Ingredients: Appetizer: N/A; Entrée: N/A; Dessert: N/A; Contestants: N/A (eliminated after the appetizer); N/A (eliminated after the entrée); N/A (eliminated after the dessert); N/A (winner); Notes: Compilation episode featuring highlights from five dessert rounds from previously-aired episodes.

=== Grill Masters Tournament (2018) ===
No. overall	No. in season	Title	Judges	Original release date
S33	TBA	"Grill Masters: Kansas City"	Geoffrey Zakarian, Amanda Freitag, and Moe Cason	July 31, 2018
Ingredients: Appetizer: burnt ends, nettles, double-cut pork chops, gingerbread cookie sandwiches; Entrée: Kansas City strip steak, green tomatoes, soda pop, spicy black beans; Dessert: pig ears, banana pudding, pineapple, pound cake; Contestants: Jeremy Williams, Pit Master & Co-Owner from Kansas City, MO (eliminated after the appetizer); Craig Carter, Pit Master from Kansas City, MO (eliminated after the entrée); Katey Magee, Chef from Kansas City, MO (eliminated after the dessert); Stephanie Wilson, Pit Master & BBQ team Co-Owner from Kansas City, MO (winner); Notes: For the first time, the 5 part grilling tournament was hosted indoors; on the Chopped set (redecorated to suit the grill theme, though it's not the first time the show has had all-grilling episodes). Each episode features four chefs from a region known for their barbecue; this episode featured Kansas City, MO. The winner of this episode would go on to the finale to compete for $50,000. Guest judge Moe Cason was a contestant in the 2017 Chopped Grill Masters Tournament. The entree round obscured the soda pop brand (which appeared to be ‘’Dr. Pepper’’) but featured Bush's spicy black beans (a long-time sponsor of Chopped).
S34	TBA	"Grill Masters: North Carolina"	Marc Murphy, Chris Santos, and Elizabeth Karmel	August 7, 2018
Ingredients: Appetizer: pork cracklins, brook trout, cone cabbage, white vinegar powder; Entrée: pork butt, collard greens, applesauce, liver pudding; Dessert: strawberry sonker with milk dip, sweet tea, Moravian cookies, sweet potatoes; Contestants: Jerry Stephenson Jr., Pit Master and Owner from Johnston County, NC (eliminated after the appetizer); Christopher Prieto, Pit Master and Owner from Knightdale, NC (eliminated after the entrée); Melanie Dunia, Executive Chef from Raleigh, NC (eliminated after the dessert); Adam Hughes, Pit Master from Edenton, NC (winner); Notes: This is part 2 of a 5 part grilling competition. Each episode features four chefs from a region known for their barbecue; this episode featured North Carolina. The "sonker" in the third round is a type of deep-dish cobbler with a lattice pie crust on top, with a "milk dip" on the side that mimics crème anglaise.
S35	TBA	"Grill Masters: Memphis"	Chris Santos, Scott Conant, and Melissa Cookston	August 14, 2018
Ingredients: Appetizer: BBQ nachos, eggplant, Tennessee whiskey, pork tenderloin; Entrée: chicken legs, string beans, fool's gold loaf, quick cook grits; Dessert: blueberry buckle, peaches, honeycomb candy, Memphis BBQ sauce ice cream; Contestants: Claire Campbell, Pitmaster from Memphis, TN (eliminated after the appetizer); Walter Crutchfield, Jr., Chef and Owner from Memphis, TN (eliminated after the entrée); Ernie Mellor, Pitmaster and Restaurant Owner from Memphis, TN (eliminated after the dessert); Melvin "Boots" Johnson, Executive Chef from New York, NY (winner); Notes: This is part 3 of a 5 part grilling competition. Each episode features four chefs who specialize in a specific region's barbecue; this episode featured Memphis, TN. Chef Campbell is the sister of former Chopped contestant Erin Campbell. A basket item in the appetizer round (BBQ nachos) was originated by chef Mellor. The winner, despite currently working in New York, grew up with ‒ and cooks ‒ Memphis style barbecue.
S36	TBA	"Grill Masters: Texas"	Alex Guarnaschelli, Chris Santos, and Ernest Servantes	August 21, 2018
Ingredients: Appetizer: short ribs, spicy mealworms, Texas toast, okra; Entrée: chile con queso, rainbow carrots, deep-fried barbecue sauce, beef brisket; Dessert: beef sausage, ruby red grapefruit, Texas pecan cake, Belgian-style wheat ale; Contestants: Sloan Rinaldi, Pit Master and Owner from Houston, TX (eliminated after the appetizer); Carlo Casanova, Pit Master from San Antonio, TX (eliminated after the entrée); Esaul Ramos, Pit Master and Owner from San Antonio, TX (eliminated after the dessert); Leonard Botello, Pit Master and Owner from Brenham, TX (winner); Notes: This is part 4 of a 5 part grilling competition. Each episode features four chefs from a region known for their barbecue; this episode featured Texas. The third judge in this episode, Ernest Servantes, is a Texas native and winner of the first Chopped Grill Masters Tournament. Chopped normally obscures brand names, but the third basket featured Blue Moon wheat ale (a sponsor of the tournament).
S37	TBA	"Grill Masters: Final Showdown"	Chris Santos, Amanda Freitag, and Myron Mixon	August 28, 2018
Ingredients: Appetizer: bacon-wrapped smoked doughnuts, pork porterhouse, corn shoots, pimento cheese; Entrée: charcoal cocktail, baby turnips, mashed potato sundae, standing rib roast; Dessert: tiered cornbread cake, marshmallow spread, figs, candy filled piñata; Contestants: Leonard Botello, Pit Master and Owner from Brenham, TX (eliminated after the appetizer); Adam Hughes, Pit Master from Edenton, NC (eliminated after the entrée); Stephanie Wilson, Pit Master & Co-Owner from Kansas City, MO (eliminated after the dessert); Melvin "Boots" Johnson, Executive Chef from New York, NY (winner); Notes: This is the finale of 2018's grilling competition. The finalists represented Missouri, North Carolina, Tennessee, and Texas, all competing for a chance at $50,000. The piñata in the dessert basket was shaped like a red chili pepper and filled with caramel squares, malt balls, strawberry hard candies, and taffy.

=== Just Desserts (2020) ===
No. overall	No. in season	Title	Judges	Original release date
S38	TBA	"Just Desserts: Celebrities"	N/A, N/A, and N/A	March 30, 2020
Ingredients: Appetizer: N/A; Entrée: N/A; Dessert: N/A; Contestants: N/A (eliminated after the appetizer); N/A (eliminated after the entrée); N/A (eliminated after the dessert); N/A (winner); Notes: Compilation episode featuring highlights from five dessert rounds from previously-aired episodes.

=== A Very Chopped Holiday (2020) ===
No. overall	No. in season	Title	Judges	Original release date
S39	TBA	"A Very Chopped Holiday"	N/A, N/A, and N/A	December 22, 2020
Ingredients: Appetizer: gin, rosemary simple syrup, ginger beer, cranberry juice, sugared cranberries, copper cup; Entrée: a bowl of ice cream, espresso, judge's note; Dessert: cleaver, champagne, champagne flute; Contestants: N/A (eliminated after the appetizer); N/A (eliminated after the entrée); N/A (eliminated after the dessert); N/A (winner); Notes: Ted Allen hosted this special Holiday themed compilation episode featuring highlights from previously-aired episodes, both holiday and non-holiday. Throughout the episode, Ted opened baskets featuring tongue-in-cheek ingredients for simple holiday treats: the first basket was for a holiday variant on the Moscow Mule cocktail, the second basket was for a simple affogato, and the third basket allowed for Ted to simply use the cleaver to chop off the top of the champagne bottle.

== See also ==
- List of Chopped: Canada episodes
- List of Chopped Junior episodes
- List of Chopped Sweets episodes
