= List of The Best Thing I Ever Ate episodes =

The Best Thing I Ever Ate, an American television show, premiered on June 22, 2009, on Food Network in the United States. In 2017, the series transferred to Cooking Channel for one season of compilations from the previous six seasons, then with new episodes in its eighth season. As of 2021, eleven seasons have aired, for a total of 143 episodes. (This does not include the eight-episode special series All-Star Best Thing I Ever Ate that aired on Food Network in 2020.) The show features renowned chefs like Bobby Flay, Guy Fieri, and Ted Allen talking about their favorite dishes in specific categories.

== Series overview ==
Season	Episodes	Originally aired	
Season	Episodes	Season premiere	Season finale
1	10	June 21, 2009	August 18, 2009
2	13	December 1, 2009	March 26, 2010
3	13	May 31, 2010	September 6, 2010
4	14	September 27, 2010	January 3, 2011
5	13	May 16, 2011	August 22, 2011
6	7	September 12, 2011	December 5, 2011
7	15	September 3, 2017	January 14, 2018
8	13	December 11, 2017	March 19, 2018
9	17	September 3, 2018†	April 8, 2019†
10	14	November 15, 2018†	July 15, 2019†
11	14	October 28, 2019	February 10, 2020

† - NOTE: The listed airdates for Seasons 9 and 10 (via the COOKING CHANNEL GO App) have some overlap.

== Episode list ==
=== Season 1: 2009 ===
No. overall	No. in season	Title	Original release date
1	1	"Totally Fried"	June 1, 2009
2	2	"Bar-B-Que"	June 8, 2009
3	3	"With Bacon"	June 15, 2009
4	4	"Sugar Rush"	June 22, 2009
5	5	"Pizza"	June 29, 2009
6	6	"Obsessions"	July 6, 2009
7	7	"Wake Up Call"	July 13, 2009
8	8	"Between Bread"	July 20, 2009
9	9	"With My Hands"	July 27, 2009
10	10	"Filled With Envy"	August 3, 2009

=== Season 2: 2009–2010 ===
No. overall	No. in season	Title	Original release date
11	1	"Holiday"	October 31, 2009
12	2	"Hometown Favorites"	November 7, 2009
13	3	"Cheesy"	November 14, 2009
14	4	"Salty Goodness"	November 21, 2009
15	5	"Meat-Fest"	November 28, 2009
16	6	"Snack Attack"	December 4, 2009
17	7	"Chocolate"	December 11, 2009
18	8	"Crunchy"	December 18, 2009
19	9	"The Classics"	January 28, 2010
20	10	"Guilty Pleasures"	February 4, 2010
21	11	"Hot & Spicy"	February 11, 2010
22	12	"Totally Unexpected"	February 18, 2010
23	13	"Served Cold"	March 1, 2010

=== Season 3: 2010 ===
No. overall	No. in season	Title	Original release date
24	1	"Grilled"	April 14, 2010
25	2	"Simply Irressistible"	April 21, 2010
26	3	"Regional Favorites"	April 28, 2010
27	4	"Sweet Tooth"	May 5, 2010
28	5	"Burgers"	May 12, 2010
29	6	"Appetizers"	May 19, 2010
30	7	"In a Bowl"	May 26, 2010
31	8	"Hidden Treasures"	June 2, 2010
32	9	"Sauced"	June 9, 2010
33	10	"With Fruit"	June 16, 2012
34	11	"Sliced"	June 23, 2010
35	12	"Last Supper"	June 30, 2010
36	13	"Best Thing I Ever Drank"	July 7, 2010

=== Season 4: 2010–2011 ===
No. overall	No. in season	Title	Original release date
37	1	"Bang for the Buck"	September 27, 2010
38	2	"Close to Home"	October 4, 2010
39	3	"Nutty"	October 11, 2010
40	4	"At a Deli"	October 18, 2010
41	5	"Under Wraps"	October 25, 2010
42	6	"Cake Walk"	November 1, 2010
43	7	"With Chopsticks"	November 8, 2010
44	8	"That I'm Thankful For"	November 15, 2010
45	9	"Crazy Good"	November 29, 2010
46	10	"With Garlic"	December 6, 2010
47	11	"The Best Thing I Ever Made for the Holidays"	December 13, 2010
48	12	"For Brunch"	December 20, 2010
49	13	"On a Stick"	December 27, 2010
50	14	"Reinvented Classics"	January 3, 2011

=== Season 5: 2011 ===
No. overall	No. in season	Title	Original release date
51	1	"Combos"	May 16, 2011
52	2	"Fried Chicken"	May 23, 2011
53	3	"Smoky"	May 30, 2011
54	4	"Better than Mine"	June 6, 2011
55	5	"Las Vegas"	June 13, 2011
56	6	"Road Trip"	June 20, 2011
57	7	"Old School"	June 27, 2011
58	8	"Ice Creamy"	July 3, 2011
59	9	"French Favorites"	July 10, 2011
60	10	"Eggstraordinary"	July 17, 2011
61	11	"Finger Food"	July 24, 2011
62	12	"Street Food"	July 31, 2011
63	13	"Childhood Favorites"	August 22, 2011

=== Season 6: 2011 ===
No. overall	No. in season	Title	Original release date
64	1	"All American"	September 12, 2011
65	2	"New Orleans"	September 19, 2011
66	3	"Messy"	September 26, 2011
67	4	"As Good as Mom's"	October 3, 2011
68	5	"Frightfully Good"	October 24, 2011
69	6	"Bird is the Word"	November 14, 2011
70	7	"Season's Eatings"	December 5, 2011

=== Season 7: 2017 (compilations) ===
No. overall	No. in season	Title	Original release date
71	1	"Chicago"	September 3, 2017
72	2	"Atlanta"	September 10, 2017
73	3	"Miami"	October 22, 2017
74	4	"Mid-Atlantic"	September 24, 2017
75	5	"Los Angeles"	October 1, 2017
76	6	"Memphis"	October 8, 2017
77	7	"Dallas"	October 15, 2017
78	8	"New England"	September 17, 2017
79	9	"Philadelphia"	October 29, 2017
80	10	"Seattle"	November 5, 2017
81	11	"New Orleans"	November 19, 2017
82	12	"New York"	November 26, 2017
83	13	"San Diego"	December 24, 2017
84	14	"Bay Area"	January 7, 2018
85	15	"Vegas"	January 14, 2018

=== Season 8: 2017–2018 ===
No. overall	No. in season	Title	Original release date
86	1	"Worth the Wait"	December 11, 2017
87	2	"Feats of Meat"	December 18, 2017
88	3	"Life Changers"	January 8, 2018
89	4	"Picture Perfect"	January 15, 2018
90	5	"Throwback"	January 22, 2018
91	6	"Voted Most Popular"	January 29, 2018
92	7	"Southern Charm"	February 5, 2018
93	8	"Extra Crispy"	February 12, 2018
94	9	"Big Cheese"	February 19, 2018
95	10	"Sandwich Hall of Fame"	February 26, 2018
96	11	"Serious Spice"	March 5, 2018
97	12	"Hamburger Heaven"	March 12, 2018
98	13	"Small Plates, Big Taste"	March 19, 2018

=== Season 9: 2018–2019 ===
No. overall	No. in season	Title	Original release date
99	1	"Chocolicious"	September 3, 2018
100	2	"Southern Eats"	September 10, 2018
101	3	"Awesome Asian"	September 20, 2018
102	4	"Terrific Italian"	September 27, 2018
103	5	"Rise and Dine"	October 4, 2018
104	6	"Mexican Favorites"	October 11, 2018
105	7	"Brilliantly Baked"	October 18, 2018
106	8	"Sweet Stuff"	October 25, 2018
107	9	"High Steaks"	January 28, 2019
108	10	"Decadent Donuts"	February 18, 2019
109	11	"The Upper Crust"	February 25, 2019
110	12	"Lets Do Lunch"	March 4, 2019
111	13	"Back to School"	March 11, 2019
112	14	"The Closers"	March 18, 2019
113	15	"Layers of Goodness"	March 25, 2019
114	16	"I'll Have What They're Having"	April 1, 2019
115	17	"One of a Kind"	April 8, 2019

=== Season 10: 2018-2019 ===
No. overall	No. in season	Title	Original release date
116	1	"Trigger Foods"	November 15, 2018
117	2	"On a Date"	February 4, 2019
118	3	"Chocolate Bliss"	February 11, 2019
119	4	"Game Changers"	April 29, 2019
120	5	"Best Meal Deal"	May 6, 2019
121	6	"Asian Sensations"	May 13, 2019
122	7	"Key Ingredient"	May 20, 2019
123	8	"Feast of the Middle East"	June 3, 2019
124	9	"New Deli Done Right"	June 10, 2019
125	10	"Special Occasion"	June 17, 2019
126	11	"Genuine Legends"	June 24, 2019
127	12	"Yummy in the Middle"	July 1, 2019
128	13	"Culinary Revolutions"	July 8, 2019
129	14	"In the Last Place You'd Expect"	July 15, 2019

=== Season 11: 2019-2020 ===
No. overall	No. in season	Title	Original release date
130	1	"Desert Island Dish"	October 28, 2019
131	2	"On Wheels"	November 4, 2019
132	3	"Thanksgiving"	November 18, 2019
133	4	"Kids' Menu"	November 25, 2019
134	5	"Holiday Delights"	December 9, 2019
135	6	"Low and Slow"	December 16, 2019
136	7	"Pie's the Limit"	December 23, 2019
137	8	"On the Waterfront"	December 30, 2019
138	9	"Borrowed Favorites"	January 6, 2020
139	10	"Stacked"	January 13, 2020
140	11	"Stretchy Pants Required"	January 20, 2020
141	12	"More Than I Can Count!"	January 27, 2020
142	13	"Fried and Gone to Heaven"	February 3, 2020
143	14	"Buttered Up"	February 10, 2020
