= Ray Lampe =

American chef and television personality

- Born: Chicago
- Culinary career
- Cooking style: BBQ/Southern
- Previous restaurant
- Southern Hospitality (2008-2009)
- Television shows
- World Food Championships; Chopped; Tailgate Warriors With Guy Fieri; American Grilled
- Awards
- BBQ Hall of Fame
- Website: drbbq.com

Ray Lampe is a BBQ pitmaster, author and television personality known as "Dr. BBQ."

== Career ==
Lampe grew up in Chicago and worked in his family trucking business for 25 years before embarking on a culinary career. In the early 80s he began competing in BBQ cook-offs as an amateur. In 2000 he moved to Florida and became an outdoor cooking expert. In 2008 he was brought in as executive chef to revamp Justin Timberlake's Southern Hospitality restaurant in New York City. In June 2016, Lampe announced a restaurant partnership in Tampa Bay Times with Suzanne and Roger Perry who also own Datz, Dough, and Roux of Datz Restaurant Group. The restaurant is called Dr. BBQ and opened in St. Petersburg, Florida in the Edge District.

== Television ==
Lampe has been a judge in several television cooking programs including the World Food Championships, Tailgate Warriors With Guy Fieri and American Grilled. As a contestant he competed on the Food Network's Chopped.
