= Whitney Miller =

American chef

- Born: Whitney Leigh Miller; June 1, 1988 (age 38); Poplarville, Mississippi, U.S.
- Years active: 2010-present
- Culinary career
- Cooking style: Southern food, Baking, Pastries
- Award won: 2010 MasterChef winner (FOX)

Whitney Leigh Miller Humphrey (born June 1, 1988) is an American chef who won the first season of the U.S. version of MasterChef in 2010. Miller was named the first ever American MasterChef winner by MasterChef judges, Gordon Ramsay, Graham Elliot, and Joe Bastianich.

== Profile ==
Miller grew up in a very food, faith, and family-oriented environment, always in the kitchen cooking with her mother and two sisters or her great-grandmother. Benefiting from her great-grandmother's inspiration in Southern hospitality and cooking large Sunday dinners for extended family and friends, she aspired to be a great cook from an early age. Because of her talent with desserts on Fox's MasterChef, she was deemed the "Pastry Princess." Her cooking style encompasses using fresh ingredients and putting her own modern twist on Southern classics. In 2014, she married Ryan Humphrey, and in 2016 she gave birth to a son they named Miller.

== Season 1 of MasterChef (U.S., 2010) ==
Miller entered the competition as a small town girl home cook and a college student from Poplarville, Mississippi. She first appeared in episode 2 of MasterChef (U.S.). Despite being young (22 years old), she mentioned that she has great ambition and that being young doesn't mean she doesn't have as much experience as anybody else in the competition. In the 14 episodes, she won three mystery box and elimination challenges, and five of her dishes were chosen in the top 3, one of which led her to the finale.

In the finale, Miller's final dishes were sweet shrimp on crispy cornbread with black eyed pea purée for the appetizer, country fried chicken for the entrée, and a white chocolate bread pudding for the dessert. In what the judges described as a "difficult, but unanimous decision," and for having better overall execution of her final three dishes, Miller was chosen as the first US winner of MasterChef. She won a quarter of a million dollars, a personalized cookbook and the prestigious MasterChef trophy.

Miller wrote her MasterChef cookbook, Modern Hospitality: Simple Recipes with Southern Charm, which was released in July 2011.

In 2011, Miller returned as a guest in season 2, episode 9, of MasterChef (U.S.), where the contestants had to replicate one of her signature dishes, crispy catfish with homemade slaw and sweet potato fries.

== Professional career and highlights ==
Miller has been featured across the globe in Southern cuisine cooking promotions, including The St. Regis Tianjin in China. In January 2013, Miller was featured as the opening night chef (the first Southern chef) at Chefdance 2013 within the Sundance Film Festival, cooking for celebrities such as Kenny Loggins and Norman Seeff.

Miller's professional career includes developing recipes and/or creating videos for companies such as SousVide Supreme in the US and Malaysia, magazines such as Clean Eating and Southern Living, and nonprofits such as the Mississippi Girl Scouts of the USA. She has conducted guest cooking classes at Viking Cooking Schools in Mississippi and in February 2013, Surfas in Costa Mesa, California. Working with Panera Bread as the featured food expert, in July 2013, she hosted an online chat, giving cooking and entertaining tips.

Miller acted as a frequent guest host for ABC 33/40's Talk of Alabama TV cooking segment. She utilizes her seasoned palate as a judge for food competitions such as the 2013 World Food Championships held in Las Vegas. She also created recipes for California Olive Ranch and participated in Food Blog South 2014 in which she gave samples of her olive oil biscuits.

Her recipes have been featured in the MasterChef and Ultimate MasterChef cookbooks. She is a food writer of magazine articles for Flavors (Atlanta), Taste of Home, Southern Living, and Eat. Drink. Mississippi. Her recipes, articles, and book promotions have appeared in People, Women's Health, MasterChef, Clean Eating, and Cooking Light magazines as well as online at Self, California Olive Ranch, and SousVide Supreme.com and also in national publications such as Spirit of Women.

On October 21, 2015, it was announced that Miller will be joining The Coop in Orlando, Florida. The Coop is owned by John Rivers of 4 Rivers Smokehouse.

| Preceded by None | MasterChef winner 2010 | Succeeded by Jennifer Behm |
