= List of Chopped episodes =

This is the list of episodes for the Food Network competition reality series Chopped. New episodes are broadcast on Tuesdays at 9 p.m. ET.

== Series overview ==
See the following pages for lists of episodes by season:

- Seasons 1–20
- Seasons 21–40
- Season 41 to present, plus specials

| Season | Episodes | Originally released | |
| Season | Episodes | First released | Last released |
|---|---|---|---|
| 1 | 13 | January 13, 2009 | April 7, 2009 |
| 2 | 13 | June 16, 2009 | September 29, 2009 |
| 3 | 13 | October 13, 2009 | March 9, 2010 |
| 4 | 13 | April 6, 2010 | July 13, 2010 |
| 5 | 13 | July 20, 2010 | November 28, 2010 |
| 6 | 12 | January 4, 2011 | April 26, 2011 |
| 7 | 10 | May 3, 2011 | July 5, 2011 |
| 8 | 9 | July 12, 2011 | December 6, 2011 |
| 9 | 13 | August 30, 2011 | December 13, 2011 |
| 10 | 13 | December 20, 2011 | May 29, 2012 |
| 11 | 13 | February 7, 2012 | November 25, 2012 |
| 12 | 13 | June 5, 2012 | November 20, 2012 |
| 13 | 12 | September 4, 2012 | February 26, 2013 |
| 14 | 13 | January 6, 2013 | May 5, 2013 |
| 15 | 13 | April 2, 2013 | July 23, 2013 |
| 16 | 13 | June 2, 2013 | November 12, 2013 |
| 17 | 13 | August 13, 2013 | December 3, 2013 |
| 18 | 13 | November 26, 2013 | May 13, 2014 |
| 19 | 13 | February 4, 2014 | June 10, 2014 |
| 20 | 13 | March 18, 2014 | November 25, 2014 |
| 21 | 13 | July 15, 2014 | January 13, 2015 |
| 22 | 13 | October 14, 2014 | June 30, 2015 |
| 23 | 13 | December 16, 2014 | June 16, 2015 |
| 24 | 13 | April 28, 2015 | December 8, 2015 |
| 25 | 13 | August 25, 2015 | December 1, 2015 |
| 26 | 8 | October 6, 2015 | December 17, 2015 |
| 27 | 13 | January 5, 2016 | March 17, 2016 |
| 28 | 13 | March 29, 2016 | June 21, 2016 |
| 29 | 13 | August 7, 2016 | September 27, 2016 |
| 30 | 8 | September 22, 2016 | December 20, 2016 |
| 31 | 20 | October 13, 2016 | December 29, 2016 |
| 32 | 12 | January 3, 2017 | May 2, 2017 |
| 33 | 8 | March 21, 2017 | May 30, 2017 |
| 34 | 13 | May 9, 2017 | November 7, 2017 |
| 35 | 20 | July 18, 2017 | March 6, 2018 |
| 36 | 13 | December 12, 2017 | June 5, 2018 |
| 37 | 13 | March 13, 2018 | June 11, 2019 |
| 38 | 13 | May 15, 2018 | May 28, 2019 |
| 39 | 13 | June 26, 2018 | May 14, 2019 |
| 40 | 13 | July 17, 2018 | July 16, 2019 |
| 41 | 13 | December 11, 2018 | March 31, 2020 |
| 42 | 8 | November 20, 2018 | June 2, 2020 |
| 43 | 13 | July 9, 2019 | February 25, 2020 |
| 44 | 13 | September 24, 2019 | August 4, 2020 |
| 45 | 13 | January 21, 2020 | July 28, 2020 |
| 46 | 13 | July 14, 2020 | October 27, 2020 |
| 47 | 13 | April 7, 2020 | May 25, 2021 |
| 48 | 13 | December 15, 2020 | March 30, 2021 |
| 49 | 13 | November 10, 2020 | May 18, 2021 |
| 50 | 18 | June 1, 2021 | March 22, 2022 |
| 51 | 13 | December 28, 2021 | April 5, 2022 |
| 52 | 13 | April 12, 2022 | October 25, 2022 |
| 53 | 13 | October 18, 2022 | August 8, 2023 |
| 54 | 13 | December 27, 2022 | March 28, 2023 |
| 55 | 19 | April 4, 2023 | December 12, 2023 |
| 56 | 13 | August 22, 2023 | January 30, 2024 |
| 57 | 13 | February 6, 2024 | August 13, 2024 |
| 58 | 13 | April 2, 2024 | June 25, 2024 |
| 59 | 13 | August 20, 2024 | May 6, 2025 |
| 60 | 13 | October 15, 2024 | July 22, 2025 |
| 61 | 13 | January 7, 2025 | July 8, 2025 |
| 62 | 13 | July 29, 2025 | May 5, 2026 |

== See also ==
- List of Chopped: Canada episodes
- List of Chopped Junior episodes
- List of Chopped Sweets episodes
