= Merry Graham =

American author & chef (born 1954)

- Born: August 24, 1954 (age 72); Redding, California, U.S.
- Education: California State University, Chico, Cal Poly
- Spouse: Richard Graham (m. 1976)
- Children: Tiffany Michelle
- Culinary career
- Cooking style: Home Chef, Competitive Cook
- Television shows: Rachael Ray; World Food Championships; Clash of the Grandmas; Food Network
- Website: www.amerryrecipe.com

Merry Graham (born August 24, 1954) is an American author and award-winning home chef.

She was named the "Healthiest Cook In America" by Bobby Flay and a panel of culinary expert judges, when she won the Healthy Food Fight National Cooking Contest (2015), which was sponsored by Aetna and held at ABC Studios in Times Square, New York.

Graham has appeared on several televised competitive cooking shows. In 2015, she competed on season 1 of Food Network's Clash of the Grandmas making it to the final round of the Thanksgiving themed cooking competition. In 2014, she was one of five finalists to compete on the Rachael Ray Show's Great American Cookbook Competition. She has also appeared on and competed in the World Food Championships for the past five years, televised on FYI. And in 2014, she was selected as a finalist in the 47th Annual Pillsbury Bake-Off Contest, winning the Gluten Free Award for her Herbs and Seeds Parmesan Crackers original gluten-free recipe - presented to her by Top Chef and The Chew host, Carla Hall.

Graham's original recipes have been featured in a variety of publications, including Taste of Home, and Betty Crocker Magazine,.

Graham was first published as an author in 2006, when she co-authored a Christian Bible reference book, Scriptures At Your Fingertips, published by Simon & Schuster. In 2008, she released a follow-up book, Scriptures At Your Fingertips for Teens, which she co-authored with her daughter, actress and poker player Tiffany Michelle.

== Personal life ==
Graham was born in Redding, California to Patricia and Carl Ryser. She attended California State University, Chico and California Polytechnic State University, graduating from Cal Poly with a bachelor's degree in Nutrition.

== Television ==
=== Food Network ===
In November 2015, Graham was one of five chefs invited to compete on Food Network's inaugural Clash of the Grandmas. The single episode Chopped style competition had the five chef grandmothers competing in three Thanksgiving-themed elimination rounds, for a prize of $10,000. The show was judged by culinary icons Nancy Fuller, Aarti Sequeira and 2015 Food Network Star winner Eddie Jackson.

=== The Rachael Ray Show ===
Graham was featured as a finalist on Rachael Ray's Great American Cookbook Competition, a segment which aired on The Rachael Ray Show, in May 2014. She was eliminated in third place, when Shark Tank's Lori Greiner was a guest judge for the third challenge, involving salesmanship and the ability to pitch a dish.

=== World Food Championships ===
For five consecutive years (2012-2016) Graham has qualified for, and competed in, the World Food Championships.

== Books ==
Graham has authored two Bible reference books:

- Scriptures At Your Fingertips (Simon & Schuster, October 31, 2006) – ISBN 978-1582296135
- Scriptures At Your Fingertips for Teens (Simon & Schuster, September 2, 2008) – ISBN 978-1416579106

== Awards and accolades ==
- Food Network Clash of the Grandmas - 3rd Place (2015)
- Rachael Ray Great American Cookbook Competition - 3rd Place (2014)
- Pillsbury Bake-Off Gluten Free Award - Winner (2014).
- Foster Farms Fresh Chicken Contest - $10,000 Winner (2012)
- Scharffen Berger Chocolate Maker Chocolate Adventure Contest - $25,000 Winner (2012)
- Bob's Red Mill Spar For The Spurtle - Winner (2011)
- Ocean Spray's Ultimate Cranberry Recipe Contest - $10,000 Winner (2010)
