= World Food Championships (TV series) =

- Genre: Reality television
- Country of origin: United States
- Original language: English
- No. of seasons: 2
- No. of episodes: 12

Production
- Production locations: Fremont Street, Las Vegas
- Running time: 30-60 minutes
- Production company: Sharp Entertainment

Original release
- Network: Fyi
- Release: July 10, 2014

World Food Championships is a television series produced by A&E Television Networks and airing on the Fyi network. The show features competitors at the annual World Food Championships in Las Vegas where top chefs and home cooks compete for a top prize of $300,000.

== Cast ==
- Tiffany Derry - Herself - Host (10 episodes)
- Ray Lampe - Himself - Guest Judge (5 episodes)
- Whitney Miller - Guest Judge (5 episodes)
- Jeffrey Saad - Himself - Host (10 episodes)
- Ben Vaughn - Guest Judge (5 episodes)
- Jodi Taffel - Herself (1 episode)

== Season 1 ==
=== Episode 1: Burger ===
Competitors compete in regional qualifiers around the world before the best of the best head to Las Vegas. Chefs create a signature burger in the first round. In round two they must create a patty melt with an original twist. In the third round the top 10 contestants compete using a secret ingredient.

=== Episode 2: Bacon ===
Chefs participate in three rounds, first creating a signature bacon dish, then reinventing a classic and finally making use of a mystery ingredient.

=== Episode 3: Sandwich ===
The chefs create three sandwiches: a signature sandwich, a reinvented classic and sandwich with a mystery ingredient.

=== Episode 4: Pasta ===
Contestants produce three noodle dishes: a signature pasta, a classic reinvented and pasta making use of a mystery ingredient.

=== Episode 5: BBQ ===
Top BBQ chefs compete in a two-part competition.

=== Episode 6: Finale ===
Top competitors from the burger, bacon, sandwich, pasta and BBQ categories compete in a head-to-head competition for the title of World Food Champion.

== Season 2 ==
=== Episode 1: The Fight Begins ===
The World Food Championships get underway in Florida as contestants in the dessert division try to find a sweet path to the Final Table.

=== Episode 2: Follow the Steps ===
The seafood and recipe categories are featured.

=== Episode 3: Gouda Times ===
Pasta competitors try to unseat a champion; and the Gouda Girls work to redeem themselves in the sandwich division.

=== Episode 4: Battle of the Champs ===
The reigning world champs of bacon and burgers enter into difficult battles to retain their titles.

=== Episode 5: Smokin' Hot ===
Family, friendships and fun highlight the chili and BBQ divisions. That is, until it's time to turn in the dishes for judging, and then it's all business.

=== Episode 6: The Final Table ===
The final nine contestants compete to win $100,000 in cash and walk away with the championship title.
