= Le B =

Restaurant in New York City

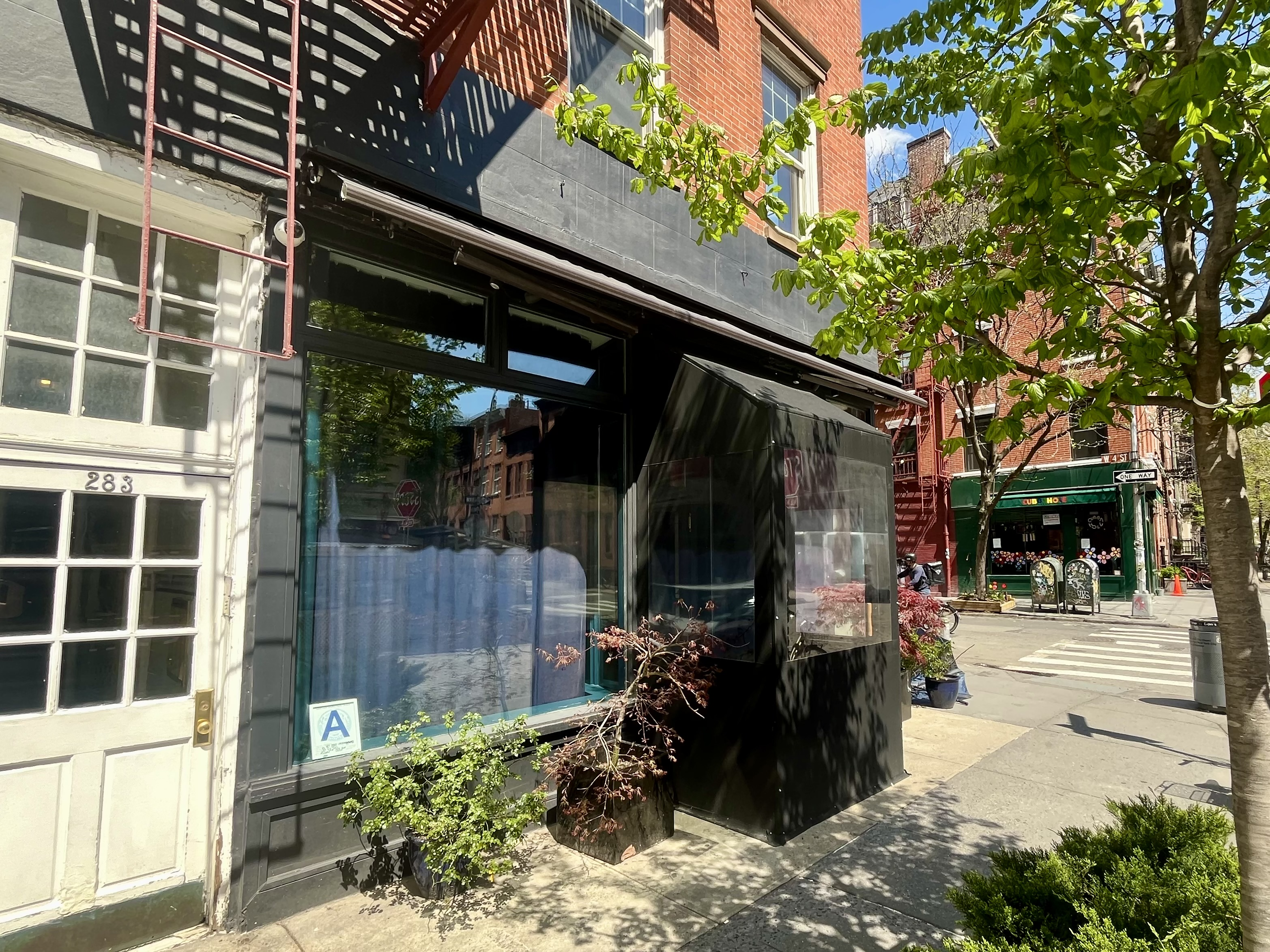
- Le B in April 2024

- Location of Les Trois Chevaux

Restaurant information
- Established: July 8, 2021; 5 years ago
- Owner: Angie Mar
- Chef: Angie Mar
- Location: 283 West 12th Street, New York City, NY 10014, United States
- Coordinates: 40.7377°N 74.0040°W
- Seating capacity: 37
- Reservations: Yes
- Other information: Replaced Les Trois Chevaux in September 2023
- Website: lebnyc.com

Le B is a fine dining restaurant in New York City. Owned and run by Angie Mar, it opened in September 2023, replacing the French restaurant Les Trois Chevaux (also owned by Mar).

== History ==
Angie Mar owned and ran The Beatrice Inn in New York City from 2016 till December 2020, when high rent and the COVID-19 pandemic led to the restaurant's closure. Mar initially announced that the restaurant would be reopening right next door at West 12th Street in Greenwich Village and renamed The Beatrice. However, at the start of 2021, she decided to open a completely new restaurant instead, named Les Trois Chevaux or "The Three Horses".

While The Beatrice Inn was a steakhouse, Les Trois Chevaux did not have steak on the menu and focused on French cuisine instead. According to Mar herself, she had been inspired by "great French restaurants of eras past" including La Côte Basque and Lutèce. The menu was developed in consultation with Jacques Pépin, who also suggested the restaurant's name. Les Trois Chevaux opened on July 8, 2021.

In September 2023, Angie Mar closed Les Trois Chevaux and revamped the restaurant, reopening it as Le B on September 22, 2023. Le B, which captures the lively spirit of The Beatrice Inn, does away with the dress code and focuses on Continental American cuisine with an added French touch. The interior also underwent changes, featuring dark blue walls and a chandelier from the now-demolished Grand Prospect Hall in Brooklyn. The updated menu now includes dishes that reflect both Mar's Seattle roots and French influences, such as Pacific Dungeness crab Wellington, bird’s nest soup with foie gras, and a fancy take on French onion dip.
