= List of Chopped Sweets episodes =

This is a list of episodes of Chopped Sweets, a dessert-themed spin-off of the television series Chopped.

== Episodes ==
=== Season 1 (2019–20) ===
No. overall	No. in season	Title	Judges	Original release date
1	1	"Winter Celebration"	Scott Conant, Thiago Silva, and Waylynn Lucas	December 30, 2019
Ingredients: Appetizer: Roasted pig head, hot chocolate French toast, cranberries, salted peppermint bark; Entrée: Meringue tower, blood oranges, marinated artichokes, chestnut puree; Dessert: Sugar cookie martini, gumdrops, butterscotch pie, quince; Contestants: Colleen Grapes (eliminated after the appetizer); Jenn Davis (eliminated after the entrée); Mike Winkelman (eliminated after the dessert); Kyleen Atonson (winner); Notes: The contestants had to make winter themed dishes in each round. Mike cut himself in Round 2 forcing him to restart his dish.
2	2	"Boozy Baskets"	Scott Conant, Adam Young, and Paulette Goto	February 3, 2020
Ingredients: Appetizer: Chocolate sardines, frozen cheesecake, dragon fruit, milkshake IPA; Entrée: Schnapps pop, frozen sliders, peaches, confetti frosting; Dessert: Giant Moscow mule, kumquats, curry powder, marshmallows; Contestants: Melissa Cockrell (eliminated after the appetizer); Julien Chantereau (eliminated after the entrée); Max Sage (eliminated after the dessert); Leen Kim (winner); Notes: Every basket included some kind of alcohol.
3	3	"Chocolate Perfection"	Scott Conant, Waylynn Lucas, and Thiago Silva	February 10, 2020
Ingredients: Appetizer: Goat vindaloo, spicy chocolate tequila, hot Italian peppers, crepe cake; Entrée: Salty fingers, chocolate lips, fish sauce, chanterelles; Dessert: Tamarind paste, pink grapefruit, sourdough bread, chocolate pizza; Contestants: Christophe Toury (eliminated after the appetizer); Justine Pringle Laird (eliminated after the entrée); Phillip Ashley Rix (eliminated after the dessert); Amber Croom (winner); Notes: The contestants had to make chocolate desserts in every round.
4	4	"Glazed and Confused?"	Scott Conant, Adam Young, and Thiago Silva	February 17, 2020
Ingredients: Appetizer: Queen Weaver ants, candy bento box, red pears, black licorice caramels; Entrée: Instant spicy ramen noodles, chocoflan, guava, spicy red candies; Dessert: Duck confit in a can, mojito, raspberries, whipped cream cheese; Contestants: Rachael Cholak (eliminated after the appetizer); Jessica Scott (eliminated after the entrée); Jason Gonzalez (eliminated after the dessert); Gonxhe Maqellara (winner); Notes: The contestants had to make doughnuts in every round. Jason Gonzalez previously competed on Season 1 of Bakers vs. Fakers as a faker, but had since opened his own bakery as of this episode.
5	5	"Tiny Treats"	Scott Conant, Elizabeth Chambers Hammer, and Zac Young	February 24, 2020
Ingredients: Appetizer: Spicy fish spread, mini chocolate champagne bottles, currants, avocado chocolate bar; Entrée: Passion fruit, jellybeans, golden milk powder, mini wedding cakes; Dessert: Mini ice cream cones, canned quail eggs, elderberries, carbonated candy; Contestants: Allison Igwe (eliminated after the appetizer); William Ankeney (eliminated after the entrée); Claudia Martinez (eliminated after the dessert); Joe Murphy (winner); Notes: The theme of this episode is mini desserts, treats that can fit in the palm of your hand.
6	6	"Tough Cookies"	Scott Conant, , and	March 2, 2020
Ingredients: Appetizer: Camel fat, longan fruit, pistachios, piñata cake; Entrée: Cookies & cream tart, sprinkles, lunch kits, raisins on the vine; Dessert: Giant toaster pastry, carrot cake jam, araucana eggs, carbonated slushy; Contestants: Josh Pickens (eliminated after the appetizer); Andrew Gonzalez (eliminated after the entrée); Lexis Gonzalez (eliminated after the dessert); Janie Deegan (winner)
7	7	"Million Dollar Desserts"	Scott Conant, , and	March 9, 2020
Ingredients: Appetizer: Cacao, snail caviar, financiers, black tie caramel apples; Entrée: Gold leaf donut, vanilla beans, long-stem strawberries, 25-yr.-aged balsamic vinegar; Dessert: Crème brulee cake, chocolate-covered truffle, rose gummy bears, Maraschinos; Contestants: Jaclyn Joseph (eliminated after the appetizer); Tim Hur (eliminated after the entrée); Julie Jangali (eliminated after the dessert); Kelsey Burack (winner); Notes: Every basket included high-end, expensive ingredients.
8	8	"Carnival Crunch Time"	Scott Conant, , and	March 16, 2020
Ingredients: Appetizer: Churro corn dogs, watermelon, cream soda, corn on the cob; Entrée: Grilled pineapple sundae, chewy fruit squares, kiwi, cherry pickles; Dessert: Unicorn popcorn, ice cream beads, rambutan, circus peanuts; Contestants: Cici Moleah (eliminated after the appetizer); Matt Pytel (eliminated after the entrée); Angela Malpedo (eliminated after the dessert); Ginger Dimapasok (winner); Notes: Every basket included ingredients inspired by either foods or themes found at carnivals.
9	9	"Desserts on a Dime"	Scott Conant, , and	March 23, 2020
Ingredients: Appetizer: Sugar wafer cookies, sweet soda baked beans, McIntosh apples, “ants on a log”; Entrée: Cheese sauce, red/white/blue pops, pineapple, potato chips; Dessert: Tomato paste, graham cracker pies, plums, whipped topping; Contestants: Brian DeMuro (eliminated after the appetizer); Sofia Demetriou (eliminated after the entrée); Gabby Sanchez (eliminated after the dessert); Jeremy Fogg (winner); Notes: Every basket's ingredients were low-cost items. Jeremy Fogg previously competed on the original Chopped in Episode 36.5 - "Gold Medal Games: Baking" with Scott Conant also as a judge, but was eliminated in the appetizer round.
10	10	"Freeze, Please!"	Scott Conant, Bryan Ford, and Matt Adlard	March 30, 2020
Ingredients: Appetizer: Negroni ice cubes, cannoli cone, finger limes, chewy tart candies; Entrée: Giant ice cream sandwich, agate candy, Cara Cara oranges, Tamago sushi; Dessert: Mangonada, chocolate-covered jalapenos, blackberries, mac and cheese donuts; Contestants: Jandee Millett (eliminated after the appetizer); Nicholas Peters-Bond (eliminated after the entrée); Jessica Stampley (eliminated after the dessert); Pooja Bavishi (winner); Notes: The contestants had to make frozen desserts in every round. Chef Nicholas previously competed on Seasons 14 and 17 of Gordon Ramsay's Hell's Kitchen in 2015 and 2017, first finishing 5th, then 3rd.
11	11	"Cake Stakes"	Scott Conant, , and	April 6, 2020
Ingredients: Appetizer: Tropical gelatin trifle, edible flowers, baby eggplant, lavender lemonade; Entrée: Jumbo chocolate bar, cottage cheese, frozen cherries, habanero hot sauce; Dessert: Chocolate-dipped superworms, macaron tower, concord grapes, Mexican cinnamon; Contestants: Anthony Cruz (eliminated after the appetizer); Winter Arif (eliminated after the entrée); Ashton Warren (eliminated after the dessert); Kim Nelson (winner); Notes: The contestants had to make some form of a cake in every round. Anthony Cruz previously worked under Buddy Valastro at Carlo's Bakery.
12	12	"Breakfast for Dessert"	Scott Conant, , and	April 13, 2020
Ingredients: Appetizer: Breakfast burrito, baby bananas, spicy cotton candy, cold brew; Entrée: Bacon & eggs candy, oats, blueberries, soy sauce; Dessert: Bowl of cereal, British toast spread, figs, liege waffle dough; Contestants: Bryan Connor (eliminated after the appetizer); Selina Boykova (eliminated after the entrée); Callista Mei (eliminated after the dessert); Thomas McCurdy (winner)
13	13	"Neapolitan Delight"	Scott Conant, Dan Langan, and Matt Adlard	April 20, 2020
Ingredients: Appetizer: Strawberry rice cereal treat, cilantro, century eggs, wild strawberry liqueur; Entrée: Rotisserie chicken, vanilla bourbon cheesecake, vanilla chai latte mix, dried apricots; Dessert: 24-layer chocolate cake, chocolate wine, frozen mixed berries, honey mustard dressing; Contestants: Jennifer Gryckiewicz (eliminated after the appetizer); Scott Breazeale (eliminated after the entrée); Ashley Torto (eliminated after the dessert); Cedric Barberet (winner); Notes: The theme of this episode was Neapolitan: strawberry, vanilla, and chocolate with each round tackling one of the flavors.

=== Season 2 (2020) ===
No. overall	No. in season	Title	Judges	Original release date
14	1	"Magical Mashups"	Scott Conant, Maneet Chauhan, and Zac Young	August 4, 2020
Ingredients: Appetizer: Sloppy Joe donut, candy-coated sunflower seeds, tamarillos, edamame hummus; Entrée: Turducken, confetti cookie dough, blood oranges, Kalimotxo; Dessert: Brownie tacos, cotton candy art, plums, pickle potato chips; Contestants: Ruthann Malsch (eliminated after the appetizer); Rod Tyler (eliminated after the entrée); Mike Guasta (eliminated after the dessert); Katherine Sprung (winner); Notes: In every round they had to make a mash-up dessert.
15	2	"Birthday Bash"	Scott Conant, Gesine Bullock Prado, and Stephanie Boswell	August 11, 2020
Ingredients: Appetizer: Fruit bouquet, birthday cake cannoli, tahini, popcorn on the cob; Entrée: Pinata, birthday cake truffles, freeze-dried ice cream, blueberries; Dessert: Cricket flour, chocolate edible birthday candles, beets, icing pouches; Contestants: Mariana Cortez (eliminated after the appetizer); Kareem Youngblood (eliminated after the entrée); Ana Wu (eliminated after the dessert); Katy Gerdes (winner); Notes: This episode was birthday themed.
16	3	"More American Than Apple Pie"	Scott Conant, Erin McDowell, and Jose Barajas	August 18, 2020
Ingredients: Appetizer: Flag cake, peanut butter, grilled hot dogs, strawberry margarita gelatin shots; Entrée: Mile High apple pie, American cheese, cherries, mayonnaise; Dessert: Banana split, French fries, fruit cocktail, beer; Contestants: Samantha Chen (eliminated after the appetizer); Joe Baker (eliminated after the entrée); Meaghan Coltrain (eliminated after the dessert); Dwayne Ingraham (winner); Notes: There were American Ingredients in each basket. Dwayne Ingraham was a winner on Cutthroat Kitchen and Best Baker In America.
17	4	"Take Me to the Tropics"	Scott Conant, Joanne Chang, and Matt Adlard	August 25, 2020
Ingredients: Appetizer: Poke bowl, rum runner, palm tree pretzels, durian; Entrée: Pina colada cake, goat butter, guava, edible seashells; Dessert: Pineapple cheese ball, canned corn, papaya, flamingo cookies; Contestants: Fabrice Benezit (eliminated after the appetizer); Paola Velez (eliminated after the entrée); Fateen Carter (eliminated after the dessert); Rebecca Reed (winner); Notes: This episode was tropical themed. Fabrice forgot his durian in Round 1 resulting in his elimination.
18	5	"Fresh 'n' Fruity"	Scott Conant, Sylvia Weinstock, and Matt Adlard	September 1, 2020
Ingredients: Appetizer: Halo-halo, strawberry fruit ribbon, kiwi, chocolate-covered cherries; Entrée: Pavlova, almond paste, pomegranate, fruit punch; Dessert: Fruitcake, tiny fruit candies, finger limes, blackberry pie filling; Contestants: Heather Smith (eliminated after the appetizer); Padua Player (eliminated after the entrée); Phillip Caramello (eliminated after the dessert); Abby Dahan (winner); Notes: Each basket contained fruit ingredients.
19	6	"Sugary Showpieces"	Zoë François, , and	September 8, 2020
Ingredients: Appetizer: Candy bar castle, black cherry hard seltzer, Calamansi limes, duck livers; Entrée: Chocolate-covered strawberry tower, peanuts in the shell, passion fruit, orange sherbet pops; Dessert: Chocolate chip cookie cake, Chinese sugar art, star fruit, Turkish delight; Contestants: Sydney Bowen (eliminated after the appetizer); Dana Herbert (eliminated after the entrée); Johana Langi (eliminated after the dessert); Sal Martone (winner); Notes: The chefs were required to make tall and elaborate desserts in each round.
20	7	"Dangerous Decadence"	, , and	September 15, 2020
Ingredients: Appetizer: Tarantulas, nutmeg, apples, rhubarb; Entrée: Tiger cake, huitlacoche, jackfruit, cassava; Dessert: Ghost peppers, Brazil nuts, elderberries, gummy python; Contestants: Kaylee Klein (eliminated after the appetizer); Emilia Tomaszycki (eliminated after the entrée); Didi Balao Rieutort (eliminated after the dessert); Juan Gutierrez (winner); Notes: The baskets featured dangerous ingredients, some deadly if prepared improperly.

=== Season 3 (2021) ===
No. overall	No. in season	Title	Judges	Original release date
21	1	"Bejeweled and Bedazzled"	Scott Conant, Maneet Chauhan, and Natalie Sideserf	May 3, 2021
Ingredients: Appetizer: Mosaic gelatin mold, silver leaf, honeydew melon, giant ring candy; Entrée: Geode cookies, candy apples, ruby red grapefruit, golden schnapps; Dessert: Sapphire cake, edible glitter, mamey, candy necklace; Contestants: Lito Morin (eliminated after the appetizer); Vanessa Parish (eliminated after the entrée); Libby Ryan (eliminated after the dessert); Monica Glass (winner); Notes: The chefs had to make dishes that were too pretty to eat. In the first round, Lito, Libby, and Monica forgot a basket ingredient. This is the first time in the Chopped franchise where 3 chefs forget an ingredient in the same round.
22	2	"Bake the Bizarre!"	Scott Conant, Maneet Chauhan, and Paulette Goto	May 10, 2021
Ingredients: Appetizer: Mitarashi dango, Creme de banana, Star apple, Emu egg; Entrée: Cow's feet, Spit cake, Egg fruit, Wasabi ice cream; Dessert: Koi panna cotta, Grass jelly drink, Black sapote, Fried chicken candy; Contestants: Alex Carter (eliminated after the appetizer); Kaley Laird (eliminated after the entrée); Allison Gilbert (eliminated after the dessert); Veronica Martinez (winner); Notes: The chefs had to work with bizarre ingredients in each round. Kaley was a runner-up on the original Chopped in the episode Snail Snafus.
23	3	"Dude! Where's My Dessert?"	Scott Conant, Damiano Carrara, and Paulette Goto	May 10, 2021
Ingredients: Appetizer: Billiard cupcakes, Scotch, Beef jerky, Mangoes; Entrée: Bacon bouquet, Caramels, Blackberries, Gochujang sriracha; Dessert: Beer brownies, Peaches, Onion-flavored snacks, White Russian; Contestants: Joe Glaser (eliminated after the appetizer); William Moyer (eliminated after the entrée); Chris Johnson (eliminated after the dessert); Jemil Gadea (winner); Notes: In this all male episode, the first to occur on Chopped Sweets, each basket contained male friendly ingredients.
24	4	"Sweet Cheesy Bliss"	, , and	May 17, 2021
Ingredients: Appetizer: Grilled cheese tower, goat cheese, Meyer lemons, fig jam; Entrée: Ube bouncy cheesecake, pears, fondue, far far; Dessert: Brie, white pizza, rainbow carrots, dragon fruit chips; Contestants: Angela Wright (eliminated after the appetizer); Paola de Maayer (eliminated after the entrée); Fritz Knipschildt (eliminated after the dessert); Kevin Futamachi (winner); Notes: Fritz previously appeared on the original Chopped, getting eliminated in the first round in the episode Salty Veggies and Heated Battles.
25	5	"It's No Picnic!"	Scott Conant, Gesine Bullock Prado, and Bryan Ford	May 17, 2021
Ingredients: Appetizer: Watermelon fruit boat, rose, potato chips, Japanese egg salad sandwich; Entrée: Tomato-mozzarella baguette, lemonade, nectarines, strawberry gelatin salad; Dessert: Picnic cookies, iced tea, dried apple chips, dirt cake; Contestants: James Jordan (eliminated after the appetizer); Holly Webster (eliminated after the entrée); Ryan Del Franco (eliminated after the dessert); Jo Koller (winner)
26	6	"Desserts in Bloom"	Scott Conant, Stephanie Boswell, and Maneet Chauhan	May 24, 2021
Ingredients: Appetizer: Botanical pops, citrus begonias, limequats, snails; Entrée: Poppy cakes, salted cherry blossoms, lemon balm, sake; Dessert: Floral gelatin treats, fennel, honeycomb, pistachios; Contestants: Divya Carmichael (eliminated after the appetizer); Rose Lawrence (eliminated after the entrée); Danielle O'Day (eliminated after the dessert); Cristian Ortiz (winner)
