= Vacuum cooking =

Vacuum cooking may refer to:

- Vacuum flask cooking
- Sous-vide, a type of sealing vacuum cooking
- Sousvide Supreme
