= Pillsbury Bake-Off =

American annual cooking contest

The Pillsbury Bake-Off is an American cooking contest, first run by the Pillsbury Company in 1949. It has been called "one of the most successful promotions in the history of the modern food business".

== History ==
The first contest was held in 1949 as the Grand National Recipe and Baking Contest and hosted in the Waldorf-Astoria Hotel. One hundred entries were selected for the final competition (97 women and 3 men). Pillsbury paid all expenses to fly in and host the contestants. At the awards banquet, Eleanor Roosevelt presented the winner with a $50,000 check. (Note: The grand prize was $25,000. Contestants could double their prize by submitting a Pillsbury seal from the flour that they used.) Every contestant received at least $100 for their recipe and took home the G.E. electric stove used in the competition. All of the recipes were published in a booklet distributed to grocers nationwide. The only required ingredient in the early contests was Pillsbury's BEST Flour.

The contest was held annually from 1949–1976, 2013 to 2014, and since 2017; from 1978 to 2012, the contest was held biennially. There was no contest in 1965 because the contest was moved from October to February. In 1971, Pillsbury trademarked the term "bake-off". There was no contest in 2015, 2016 nor 2020. The contest reverted to an annual contest in 2013 and 2014, after the previous 18 contests were held in even-numbered years. Although the 2021 contest was held virtually, the Food Network aired the contest from New York, NY.

From 1996 to 2014, the grand prize was $1,000,000. From 2018 to 2019, the grand prize was $50,000 plus a kitchen makeover from GE Appliances. Occasionally, there has been a male category winner (1978, 1990, 1992, and 2002). The only male champion was Kurt Wait of Redwood City, California, who won in 1996; that year, 14 of the 100 finalists were men.

In 2014, the contest added eight additional "Sponsor Awards" for a prize of $5,000 each. Categories and winners included:

- GE Imagination At Work Award: won by MaryJo Watkins of Scottsdale, Arizona – Muffuletta Mini Pies
- Jif Peanut Butter Award: won by Brenda Watts of Gaffney, South Carolina – Macaroon-Peanut Butter-Chocolate Tartlets
- Crisco is Cooking Award: won by Greg Fontenot of The Woodlands, Texas – Grilled Potato and Roasted Salsa Verde Pizza
- Eagle Brand Signature Recipe Award: won by Barbara Estabrook of Rhinelander, Wisconsin – Peanut and Pretzel-Peanut Butter Thumbprints
- Pillsbury Gluten Free Award: won by Merry Graham of Newhall, California – Herbs and Seeds Parmesan Crackers
- Pillsbury Clever Twist Award: won by Marie Valdes of Brandon, Florida – Spinach Dip-Stuffed Garlic Rolls
- Watkins Vanilla Award: won by Antoinette Leal of Ridgefield, Connecticut – Very Vanilla Lemon Tarts
- Reynolds Baking Magic Award: won by Elizabeth Bennett of Seattle, Washington – Chocolate-Peanut Butter-Filled Pretzels

The 2022 edition was the first in the competition's history in which the use of traditional ovens was prohibited; entrants were allowed to use any other cooking appliance. It was promoted as the "Pillsbury Ovens Off Bake-Off Contest".

== Grand prize winners ==
Year	Recipe	Grand Prize Winner/City
1949	No-Knead Water-Rising Twists	Theodora Smafield (Detroit, MI)
1950	Orange Kiss-Me Cake	Lily Wuebel (Redwood City, CA)
1951	Starlight Double-Delight Cake	Helen Weston (La Jolla, CA)
1952	Snappy Turtle Cookies	Beatrice Harlib (Chicago, IL)
1953	"My Inspiration" Cake	Lois Kanago (Weber, SD)
1954	Open Sesame Pie	Dorothy Koteen (Washington, DC)
1955	Ring-A-Lings	Bertha Jorgensen (Portland, OR)
1956	California Casserole	Hildreth H. Hatheway (Santa Barbara, CA)
1957	Accordion Treats	Gerda Roderer (Berkeley, CA)
1958	Spicy Apple Twists	Dorothy DeVault (Delaware, OH)
1959	Mardi Gras Party Cake	Eunice G. Surles (Lake Charles, LA)
1960	Dilly Casserole Bread	Leona Schnuelle (Crab Orchard, NE)
1961	Candy Bar Cookies	Alice Reese (Minneapolis, MN)
1962	Apple Pie '63	Julia Smogor (South Bend, IN)
1963	Hungry Boys' Casserole	Mira Walilko (Detroit, MI)
1964	Peacheesy Pie	Janis Boykin (Melbourne, FL)
1966	Golden Gate Snack Bread	Mari Petrelli (Las Vegas, NV)
1967	Muffin Mix Buffet Bread	Maxine Bullock (Topeka, KS)
1968	Buttercream Pound Cake	Phyllis Lidert (Oak Lawn, IL)
1969	Magic Marshmallow Crescent Puffs	Edna M. Walker (Hopkins, MN)
1970	Onion Lover's Twist	Nan Robb (Huachuca City, AZ)
1971	Pecan Pie Surprise Bars	Pearl Hall (Snohomish, WA)
1972	Streusel Spice Cake	Rose DeDominicis (Verona, PA)
1972	Quick 'n Chewy Crescent Bars	Isabelle Collins (Elk River, MN)
1973	Quick Crescent Pecan Pie Bars	Mrs. Jerome Flieller, Jr. (Floresville, TX)
1973	Banana Crunch Cake	Mrs. Ronald L. Brooks (Salisbury, MD)
1974	Chocolate Cherry Bars	Francis I. Jerzak (Porter, MN)
1974	Savoury Crescent Chicken Squares	Doris Castle (River Forest, IL)
1975	Easy Crescent Danish Rolls	Barbara S. Gibson (Fort Wayne, IN)
1975	Sour Cream Apple Squares	Luella Maki (Ely, MN)
1976	Crescent Caramel Swirl	Lois A. Groves (Greenwood Village, CO)
1976	Whole Wheat Raisin Loaf	Lenora H. Smith (Baton Rouge, LA)
1978	Nutty Graham Picnic Cake	Esther Tomich (San Pedro, CA)
1978	Chick-&-Broccoli Pot Pies	Linda Mowery (Worthington, IN)
1980	Italian Zucchini Crescent Pie	Millicent (Caplan) Nathan (Boca Ratón, FL)
1982	Almond-Filled Cookie Cake	Elizabeth Meijer (Tucson, AZ)
1984	Country Apple Coffee Cake	Susan F. Porubcan (Jefferson, WI)
1986	Apple Nut Lattice Tart	Mary Lou Warren (Medford, OR)
1988	Chocolate Praline Layer Cake	Julie (Konecne) Bengtson (Bemidji, MN)
1990	Blueberry-Poppy Seed Brunch Cake	Linda Rahman (Petunia, CA)
1992	Pennsylvania Dutch Cake and Custard Pie	Gladys Fulton (Summerville, SC)
1994	Fudgy Bonbons	Mary A. Tyndall (Whiteville, NC)
1996	Macadamia Fudge Torte	Kurt Wait (Redwood City, CA)
1998	Salsa Couscous Chicken	Ellie Mathews (Port Angeles, WA)
2000	Cream Cheese Brownie Pie	Roberta Sonefeld (Hopkins, SC)
2002	Chicken Florentine Panini	Denise J. Yennie (Nashville, TN)
2004	Oats 'n Honey Granola Pie	Suzanne Conrad (Findlay, OH)
2006	Baked Chicken and Spinach Stuffing	Anna Ginsberg (Austin, TX)
2008	Double-Delight Peanut Butter Cookies	Carolyn Gurtz (Gaithersburg, MD)
2010	Mini Ice Cream Cookie Cups	Sue Compton (Delanco, NJ)
2012	Pumpkin Ravioli with Salted Caramel Whipped Cream	Christina Verrelli (Devon, PA)
2013	Loaded Potato Pinwheels	Glori Spriggs (Henderson, NV)
2014	Peanutty Pie Crust Clusters	Beth Royals (Richmond, VA)
2018	Bejeweled Cranberry-Orange Rolls	Amy Nelson (Zionville, NC)
2019	Dublin Cheeseboard-Stuffed Appetizer Bread	Melissa Jollands (Hudsonville, MI)
2021	Sugar Cookie Skillet Pancake	Julie Holden (Austin, TX)
2022 (Note: In this year's contest, any cooking appliance could be used except a traditional oven.)	Air Fryer Greek Crescent Nachos	Laurie McKenna (Fairfield, OH)
2024	Mini Beef Wellingtons with Smoked Gouda Dipping Sauce	Julie McIntire (Independence, MO)
2026	Big Win Cookie Bark	Lori Welander (Wheaton, IL)

== Broadcast ==
Year(s)	Host	Network	Notes
1949–1957	Arthur Godfrey	CBS	
1958–68	Art Linkletter	CBS	
1970–84	Bob Barker	CBS	Placed in the same hour as a half-hour episode of The Price is Right (except 1970–1972, when Bob Barker was only hosting Miss USA and Miss Universe pageants for the CBS Network prior to his Price Is Right days)
1986–88	Gary Collins	CBS	
1986–88	Mary Ann Mobley	CBS	
1990–1992	Willard Scott	CBS	Willard Scott became the only NBC contracted person to host the Bake-Off for CBS in 1990.
1994–1998	Alex Trebek	CBS	This was Alex Trebek's second time on the CBS network, he was last seen on the Network 17 years earlier hosting the Goodson-Todman Game Show Double Dare.
2000	Phylicia Rashad	CBS	The first woman to host.
2002	Marie Osmond	CBS	
2004	Not aired	N/A	Dick Clark hosted the bake-off in 2004, but it wasn't shown on television.
2006	Not aired	N/A	Dick Clark hosted the bake-off in 2004, but it wasn't shown on television.
2008	Keegan Gerhard	Food Network	Aired as an episode of Food Network Challenge
2010	Oprah Winfrey	Syndication	Winner was announced on The Oprah Winfrey Show
2012	Martha Stewart	Hallmark Channel	Winner was announced on The Martha Stewart Show
2013	Padma Lakshmi	Syndication	Winner was announced on The Queen Latifah Show
2014	Carla Hall	ABC	Winner was announced on The Chew
2018	Ree Drummond	Food Network	Winners are announced on the Food Network television show The Kitchen
2019	Sunny Anderson and Jeff Mauro	Food Network	Winners are announced on the Food Network television show The Kitchen
2021-2024	Donna Kelce (2024); virtual	Food Network	Winners are announced on the Food Network television show The Kitchen
2026	Drew Barrymore	CBS	Winner will be announced in November -

== Location ==
- 1949–56, 1958, 1962, 2018-2024: Manhattan, New York, NY
- 1957, 1959, 1961, 1963, 1967: Los Angeles, CA
- 1960: Washington DC
- 1964, 1980: Miami, FL
- 1966, 1975, 2000: San Francisco, CA
- 1967, Century City, CA
- 1968, 1996, 2008: Dallas, TX
- 1969: Atlanta, GA
- 1970, 1984, 1988, 1994: San Diego, CA
- 1971: Honolulu, HI
- 1972: Houston, TX
- 1973, 2004: Hollywood, CA
- 1974, 1990: Phoenix, AZ
- 1976: Boston, MA
- 1978: New Orleans, LA
- 1982: San Antonio, TX
- 1986, 1992, 1998, 2002, 2006, 2010, 2012: Orlando, FL
- 2013: Las Vegas, NV
- 2014: Nashville, TN
- 2026: Jersey City, NJ
