= Tiffany Michelle =

American poker player (born 1984/85)

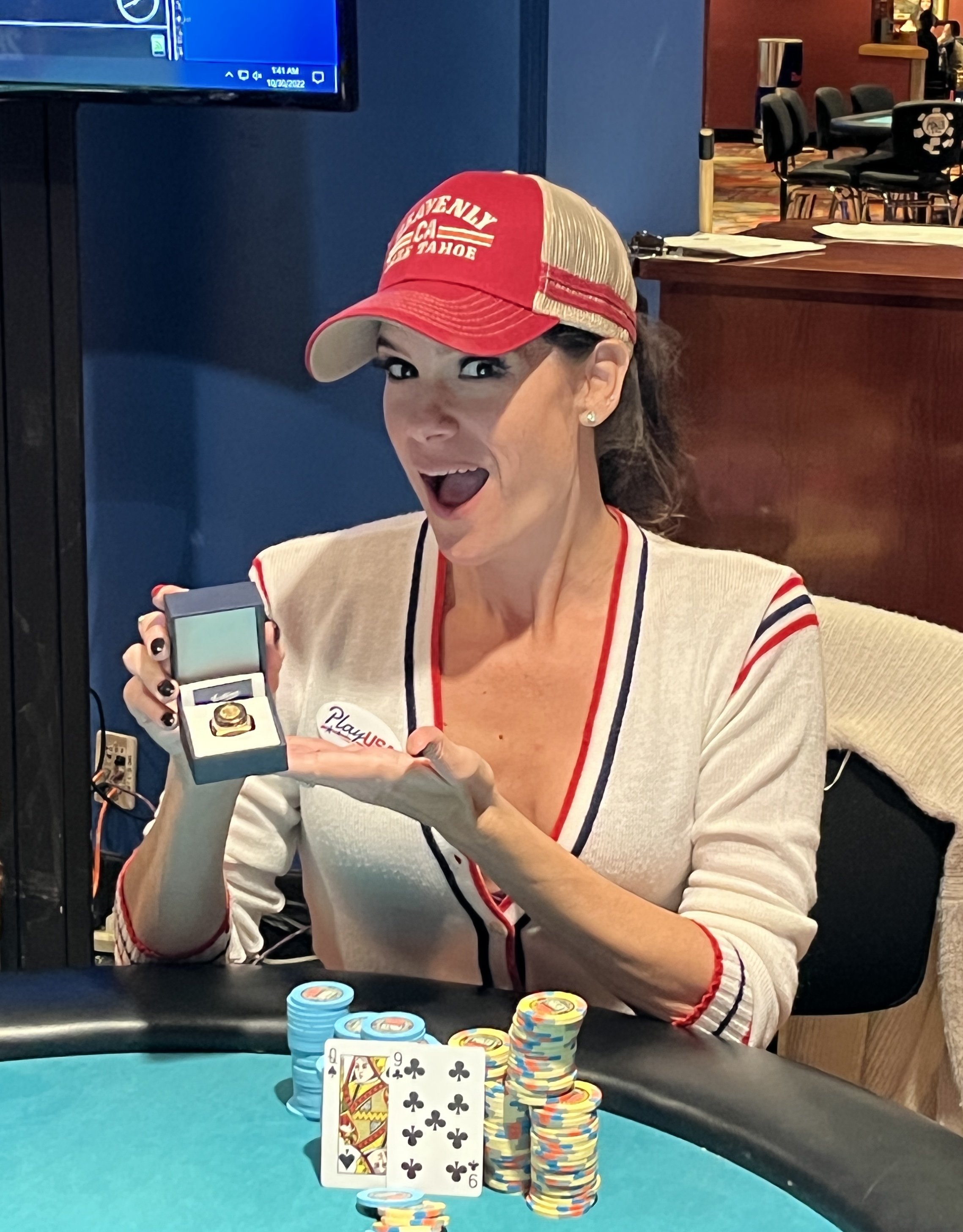
- Michelle winning the 2022 WSOP Circuit ring at Lake Tahoe
- Born: Tiffany Michelle Graham; 1984 or 1985 (age 41–42); Los Angeles, California, U.S.
- Occupations: Poker player, television host
- Known for: 2008 World Series of Poker Main Event; The Amazing Race (season 15); Worst Cooks in America (season 3)
- Mother: Merry Graham
- Website: tiffanymichelle.com

Tiffany Michelle Graham is an American professional poker player, World Series of Poker ring winner, speaker and TV host, named one of Maxim's Top 16 Hottest Celebrity Poker Players.

She was named one of the Most Fascinating People in Poker after being the Last Woman Standing at the 2008 World Series of Poker Main Event, for a payday of $334,534, and breaking the record for the largest live poker field conquered by a woman.

In 2009, competed as the only all-female team on season 15 of The Amazing Race and in 2012, finished in Bobby Flay's Top 3 on Worst Cooks in America.

== Career ==
After two years working as a television presenter/commentator and tournament reporter on the professional poker tour, Michelle played in the $10,000 buy-in World Series of Poker Main Event in 2008, where she was the "Last Woman Standing", placing 17th out of 6,844 players. It was the largest field ever beat by a female in live poker tournament history and earned her a payday of $334,534. A year later she competed as the only all-female team on the Emmy Award–winning 15th season of The Amazing Race, along with best friend and fellow poker pro Maria Ho. The two made up the "poker girls" team and were eliminated three legs shy of the finish line.

In 2010, she made four final tables but it wasn't until 2022 that she won her first WSOP gold ring at the World Series of Poker Circuit series in Lake Tahoe, California.

Michelle has been featured on the covers of Steppin' Out, Ocean View, Rounder, and Casino Player magazines. She has appeared on several television programs, including a series regular role on the soap opera series DeVanity, portraying villainess Scarlett Kane, and competing on Food Network's Worst Cooks in America LA Ink, where she finished in Bobby Flay's final 3.In 2006, Michelle was heard nationwide on Sirius Satellite Radio as an on-air reporter for Bluff Magazine's live broadcast of the 2006 WSOP. In 2007, she became the first ever female hired as the resident and full-time on-camera host for Pokernews.com.

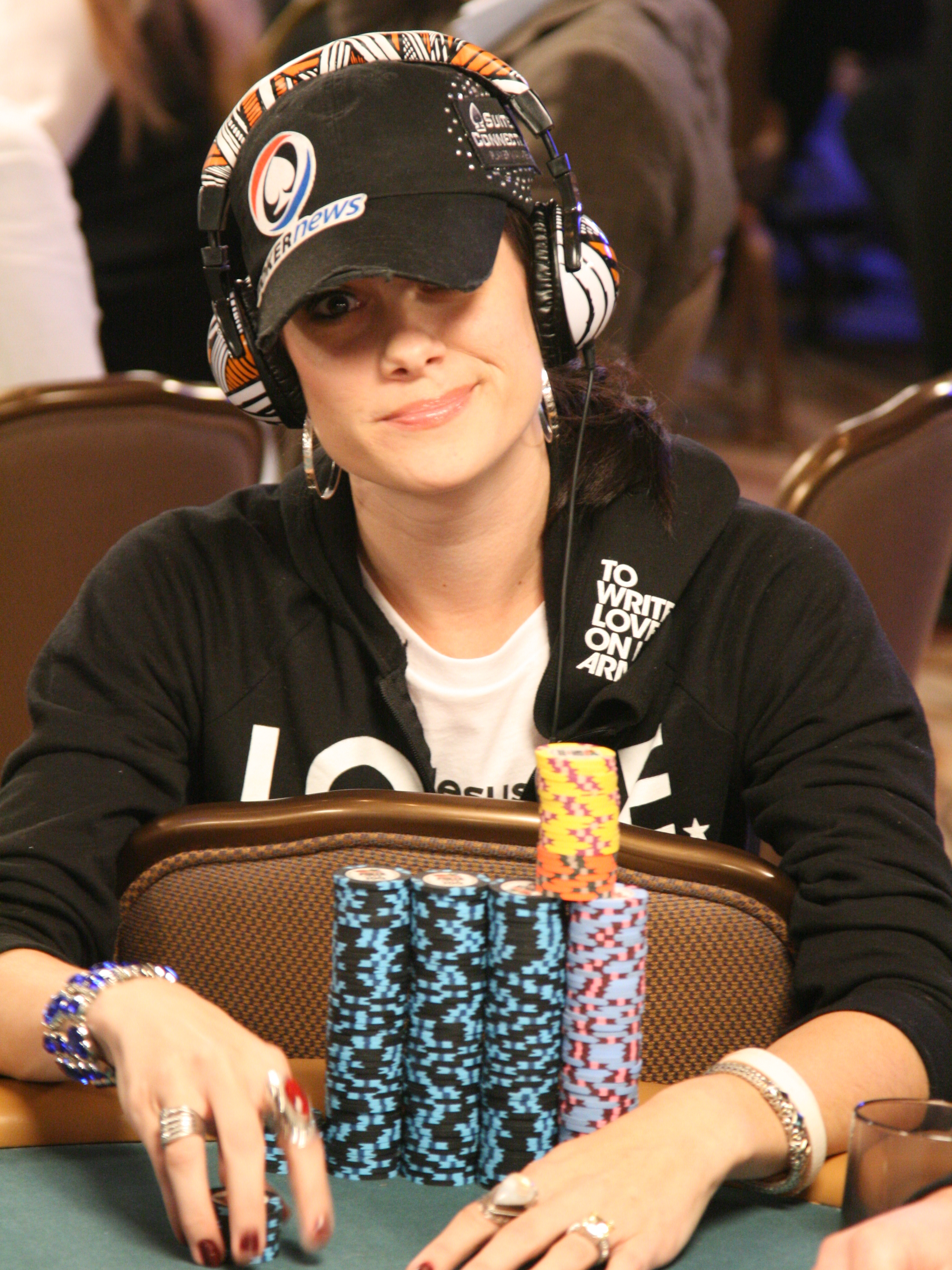
Michelle in 2008

In 2014, she was a series-regular (and resident villainess) on the DeVanity.

In 2015, she returned to her on-camera poker hosting roots, as a guest host and sideline reporter for the Heartland Poker Tour.

In 2018, she signed on as the Creative Director, and On-Camera Host of The Gardens Casino's 13-week celebrity poker live stream series Gardens Poker Night and, subsequently, appeared as a co-host on the CBS Sports televised Poker Night Live celebrity poker program

=== Reality television ===
==== The Amazing Race ====
In 2009, Michelle was invited to compete on the 15th season of the CBS competition reality show, The Amazing Race. Alongside best friend and fellow poker player, Maria Ho the two made up the season's only all-female team and they traveled to Japan, Vietnam, Cambodia, Dubai, and The Netherlands, exiting the competition in 6th place.

==== Worst Cooks in America ====
In 2012, Michelle competed as one of 16 contestants on season three of Food Network's Worst Cooks in America. She was picked by chef Bobby Flay to compete as a member of his team. She made it down to the final three contestants on Bobby Flay's team and was sent home in episode six.

== Other work ==
In 2012, Michelle was featured in Maxim's Top 20 Hottest Celebrity Poker Players.

== Personal life ==
In January 2025, Michelle and her fiancé were among the victims who lost their homes in the Palisades Fire.
