= Ellie Mathews =

American author

- Born: October 22, 1945 (age 80); Port Angeles, Washington
- Occupation: author
- Writing career
- Genres: Memoir, Children's literature, young adult fiction, novels
- Notable work: The Linden Tree
- Website: www.elliemathews.com

Ellie Mathews (born October 22, 1945, Port Angeles, Washington) is an author of fiction and nonfiction works including The Linden Tree (winner of the 2007 Milkweed Editions Prize for Children’s Literature). Her recipe for Salsa Couscous Chicken was the Grand Prize Winner of the 1998 Pillsbury Bake-Off.

Mathews holds a degree in geography from the University of Washington, 1976 with emphasis on cartography and graphic arts. In her first career she linked those interests with software development.

In the early 1990s she began writing. She has published fiction and nonfiction, has been honored with two fellowships and an arts commission award. Her book, Ambassador to the Penguins, A Naturalist’s Year Aboard a Yankee Whaleship about Robert Cushman Murphy's 1912 journey to South Georgia Island, came out to starred reviews. Her memoir The Ungarnished Truth, A Cooking Contest Memoir about winning the Pillsbury Bake-Off was published in March 2008 by Berkley Books.

== Books ==
- Ambassador to the Penguins: A Naturalist's Year Aboard a Yankee Whaleship, Godine, 2003 ISBN 1-56792-246-5
- The Linden Tree, Milkweed Editions, 2007 ISBN 1-57131-674-4
- The Ungarnished Truth: A Cooking Contest Memoir, Berkley Books, 2008 ISBN 0-425-21945-3

== Short fiction, poetry, & anthologies ==
- "Rosary," anthology selection, Floating Bridge Press, 2006
- "Maintenance Issues," Tidepools Literary Magazine, 2005
- "Riding Midnight," Cicada, July, 2004
- "High Wire," Peoples Publishing, Language Arts Series 2003
- "Face Value," Cicada, March, 2002
- "Fences," Cicada, July 2001
- "Saying Grace," Australia's School Magazine, March 2001
- "The Izzie Show," Cicada, 2001
- "High Wire," Cicada, September 2000
- "Family Pictures," Fishtrap Anthology, 2000
- "The Thickness of Water," Cicada, November 1999
- "Saying Grace," Cricket, May 1999
- "Owen's Room," Fishtrap Anthology, 1998
- "Territory," Cicada, November 1998
- "The Wolf Tree," FlipSide Magazine, Spring 1998
- "Rosary," the Metro Poetry Project, King County, WA 1998
- Four Poems, The Tinker's Quarterly, 1998
- "Thanksgiving," the Metro Poetry Project, King County, WA, 1997
- "Christmas Gifts," Friends Bulletin, December, 1995
