= Rise Up New York! =

- Created by: Robin Hood Foundation iHeartMedia
- Written by: Robert Mancini
- Presented by: Tina Fey
- Country of origin: United States
- Original language: English

Production
- Executive producers: Alex Coletti; John Sykes; Rick Krim; Casey Patterson
- Producers: Gillian Appleby; Barbra Dannov; Allison Roithinger
- Cinematography: Eric Lin
- Editors: Derek Ambrose; John Cox; Mari Keiko Gonzalez; Guy Harding; Mike Polito; Jeremy Quayhackx; Jonathan Ragsdale; Brendan Sherman; Eric Singer; Mark Stepp; Anthony Verderame
- Camera setup: Virtual
- Running time: 1 hour
- Production company: Alex Coletti Productions

Original release
- Network: Syndication
- Release: May 11, 2020

Rise Up New York! was a virtual hour-long telethon organized by the Robin Hood Foundation and iHeartMedia on May 11, 2020, aimed to support the residents of New York who had been heavily impacted by the COVID-19 pandemic in the United States. Hosted by actress Tina Fey, the event was broadcast across numerous New York–based television and radio stations and featured appearances from many prominent celebrities residing in the state.

== Overview ==
The telethon's purpose was to raise awareness and relief funds for those affected by the COVID-19 pandemic in the state of New York, which in the spring of 2020 had more cases of COVID-19 than any other US state. The donations were used to help provide food, shelter, health, education, and other services to those in need. While host Tina Fey presented the event live from 30 Rockefeller Plaza, almost every other element of the special was prerecorded. The event raised over $115 million in funds.

== Musical performances ==
Many artists and musicians performed during this event. Those that performed were:

Artist(s)	Song(s)
Mariah Carey	"Through the Rain" "Make It Happen"
PS22 Chorus	"Rise Up"
Sting	"Message in a Bottle"
Lin-Manuel Miranda; Cynthia Erivo; Idina Menzel; Ben Platt; Andrew Rannells; Christopher Jackson; Karen Olivo	"New York, New York"
Alicia Keys	"Good Job"
Bon Jovi	"It's My Life"
Billy Joel	"Miami 2017 (Seen the Lights Go Out on Broadway)"

== Appearances ==
Many celebrities, politicians, and other notable figures appeared throughout the telethon. Notable figures who made appearances during this event were:

- Robert De Niro
- Jessica Chastain
- Jennifer Lopez
- Spike Lee
- Michael Strahan
- Eli Manning
- Phil Simms
- Justin Tuck
- Sarah Jessica Parker
- Matthew Broderick
- Barbra Streisand
- Patti LuPone
- Audra McDonald
- Bette Midler
- Bill de Blasio (Mayor of New York City)
- Jake Gyllenhaal
- Trevor Noah
- David Chang
- Angie Mar
- Daniel Humm
- Danny Meyer
- Jimmy Fallon
- Chris Rock
- Mike D
- Rosie Perez
- Ad-Rock
- Darryl McDaniels
- Fab Five Freddy
- RZA
- Salt-N-Pepa
- Michael Bloomberg
- Andrew Cuomo (Governor of New York)

== Broadcast ==
The telethon was broadcast from 7pm to 8pm ET. On television, it was broadcast across the United States by CNBC, Cheddar, CNN, MTV2, MTV Classic, and MTV Live. It was also simulcast on all local broadcast television stations in New York, including WABC (ABC), WCBS (CBS), WNBC (NBC), WNYW (Fox), WWOR-TV (MyNetworkTV), WPIX (The CW), and WLNY (Independent). It was also broadcast on several New York–based regional cable channels such as MSG Network, News 12 Networks, NY1, SportsNet New York, and YES Network.

On radio, it was broadcast nationally by SiriusXM and locally on all New York–based radio stations owned by iHeartMedia and Entercom, including WHTZ (Z100), WLTW (106.7 Lite FM), WWPR-FM (Power 105.1), WAXQ (Q104.3), WKTU (104.5 KTU), WOR, WCBS-AM (WCBS Newsradio 880), WCBS-FM (101.1 CBS-FM), WFAN-AM/FM (Sports Radio 66 and 101.9), WINS-AM (1010 WINS), WNEW-FM (NEW 102.7), WNSH (New York's Country 94.7), and WNYL (ALT 92.3).

Online, it was simulcast by ABC News Live, AMC.com, Facebook, LiveXLive, NBC News Now, and NowThis News.
