= MasterChef (American TV series) season 1 =

Season of television series

MasterChef
- Season 1
- Promotional poster for season 1, featuring judge Gordon Ramsay
- Judges: Joe Bastianich; Graham Elliot; Gordon Ramsay
- No. of contestants: 14
- Winner: Whitney Miller
- Runner-up: David Miller
- No. of episodes: 13

Release
- Original network: Fox
- Original release: July 27 – September 15, 2010

Season chronology
- Next → Season 2

The first season of the American competitive reality television series MasterChef ran from July 27 to September 15, 2010 on Fox.

Whitney Miller was the winner of this inaugural season, with David Miller as the runner-up.

== Top 14 ==
Contestant	Age	Hometown	Occupation	Status
Whitney Miller	22	Poplarville, Mississippi	College Student	Winner September 15
David Miller	29	Boston, Massachusetts	Software Engineer	Runner-Up September 15
Lee Knaz	27	Venice, California	Bartender	Eliminated September 15
Sheetal Bhagat	37	Chicago, Illinois	Teacher	Eliminated September 15
Sharone Hakman	28	Los Angeles, California	Financial Advisor	Eliminated September 8
Mike Kim	34	Redondo Beach, California	Server	Eliminated September 8
Jake Gandolfo	38	Santa Cruz, California	Construction Worker	Eliminated September 1
Tracy Nailor	42	Atlanta, Georgia	Doctor	Eliminated September 1
Kim Dung "Slim" Huynh	22	Harvey, Louisiana	College Student	Eliminated September 1
Tony Carbone	31	Boston, Massachusetts	Server	Eliminated August 25
Faruq Jenkins	30	Glendale, California	Bartender	Eliminated August 25
Jenna Hamiter	23	Euless, Texas	Homemaker	Eliminated August 18
Avis White	47	Vacherie, Louisiana	Elderly Caregiver	Eliminated August 18
Sheena Zadeh	26	Anaheim, California	Marketing Executive	Eliminated August 18

== Elimination table ==
Place	Contestant	Episode															
Place	Contestant	4		5	6		7	8		9	10		11		12		13
1	Whitney	WIN	IN	PT	HIGH	IN	PT	IN	LOW	WIN	HIGH	WIN	LOW	WIN	IMM	WIN	WINNER
2	David	IN	IN	PT	IN	IN	WIN	IN	IN	WIN	IN	IN	WIN	IMM	WIN	IMM	RUNNER-UP
3	Lee	IN	IN	WIN	IN	IN	PT	WIN	WIN	LOW	IN	LOW	HIGH	IMM	IMM	ELIM	
4	Sheetal	IN	IN	WIN	IN	IN	WIN	HIGH	LOW	WIN	WIN	LOW	IN	IMM	ELIM		
5	Sharone	IN	IN	PT	WIN	IMM	WIN	HIGH	IN	WIN	HIGH	IN	LOW	ELIM			
6	Mike	IN	WIN	WIN	IN	LOW	WIN	IN	IN	PT	IN	ELIM					
7	Jake	HIGH	IN	WIN	HIGH	WIN	PT	IN	IN	ELIM							
7	Tracy	IN	IN	WIN	IN	IN	PT	IN	LOW	ELIM							
9	Slim	IN	IN	PT	IN	LOW	WIN	IN	ELIM								
10	Tony	IN	IN	WIN	IN	IN	ELIM										
11	Faruq	IN	LOW	PT	IN	ELIM											
12	Jenna	IN	IN	ELIM													
13	Avis	IN	ELIM														
13	Sheena	HIGH	ELIM														

(WINNER) This cook won the competition.
(RUNNER-UP) This cook finished in second place.
(WIN) The cook won an individual challenge (Mystery Box Challenge, Elimination Test, or Pressure Test)
(WIN) The cook was on the winning team in the Team Challenge and directly advanced to the next round.
(HIGH) The cook was one of the top entries in an individual challenge, but didn't win.
(IN) The cook wasn't selected as a top or bottom entry in an individual challenge.
(IMM) The cook didn't have to compete in that round of the competition and was safe from elimination.
(PT) The cook was on the losing team in the Team Challenge and competed in the Pressure Test.
(LOW) The cook was one of the bottom entries in an individual challenge or Pressure Test, but advanced.
(ELIM) The cook was eliminated from MasterChef.

== Episodes ==
No. overall	No. in season	Title	Original release date	U.S. viewers (millions)
1	1	"Auditions #1"	July 27, 2010	n/a
Auditions Round 1: Today Sharone, Tracy, Mike, Slim, Jake, Tony and Lee get aprons.
2	2	"Auditions #2"	August 3, 2010	n/a
Auditions Round 2: Today Whitney B., Whitney M., Faruq, Avis, David, Sheena, Hollie, Joe, Jennifer, Ryan, Adele, Dominic, Scott, Max, Charmaine, Sheetal, Jenna, and six more contestants get spots.
3	3	"Top 14 Chefs Revealed"	August 10, 2010	n/a
Skills Test Part 1: The first part of this episode involved the final 30 cutting onions both coarsely and finely diced, with any contestant being unable to cut onions to the judges' exacting standards being immediately eliminated. Paul, Ryan, Joe, Scott, Jennifer, and Hollie were eliminated during this stage, leaving 24 remaining contestants.; Skills Test Part 2: The remaining contestants were each given a single egg, and were given 30 minutes to make a dish with the egg as the centerpiece. Max, Whitney B., Charmaine, Derryl, Adeliz, Josh, Robin, Tamar, Roberto, and Asmina were eliminated in this test, leaving Avis, David, Faruq, Jake, Jenna, Slim, Lee, Mike, Sharone, Sheena, Sheetal, Tony, Tracy and Whitney M. to advance.
4	4	"Top 14 Chefs Compete, Part 1"	August 18, 2010	n/a
Mystery Box Challenge: The contestants were given their first Mystery Box. Sheena's, Jake's and Whitney's were the top three, and Whitney cooked the best dish.; Challenge Winner: Whitney Miller; Elimination Test: Whitney was allowed to select the key ingredient used by both herself and her competitors in the Elimination Test, which revolved around cooking Chinese cuisine. Whitney selected Mandarin oranges. Mike's dish was deemed the best and he was made team captain in the next round. Whitney, Slim, Tony, Jenna, Tracy, Sheetal, David, Lee and Sharone also did well enough to move on in the competition.; Winner: Mike Kim; Bottom three: Avis White, Faruq Jenkins and Sheena Zadeh; Eliminated: Avis White and Sheena Zadeh
5	5	"Top 14 Chefs Compete, Part 2"	August 18, 2010	n/a
Team Challenge: The team challenge saw the chefs being asked to cook for 100 Marines, with the judges deciding on the winning team. Mike captains the Blue Team, and chose Jake, Lee, Tracy, Tony and Sheetal to join him, leaving Sharone, David, Whitney, Slim, Faruq and Jenna to form the Red Team. Sharone took the role of team captain. The Blue team were named the winners.; Team Challenge Winners/Immune: Jake Gandolfo, Lee Knaz, Mike Kim, Sheetal Bhagat, Tony Carbone and Tracy Nailor; Pressure Test: Graham cooked a pot of Texas chili for the Red Team members, who were called up one at a time and asked to taste it, then name an ingredient. Whoever named the fewest ingredients before taking an incorrect guess would be eliminated.; Eliminated: Jenna Hamiter
6	6	"Top 11 compete, Part 1"	August 25, 2010	n/a
Mystery Box Challenge: This challenge required the contestants to bake cupcakes. Whitney, Jake, and Sharone were the top three. Sharone's cupcake gave him the win.; Challenge Winner/Immune: Sharone Hakman; Special Challenge/Elimination Test: Sharone was introduced to chef Cat Cora and shown three of her signature dishes, one of which he and all the other contestants would have to replicate. He chose a truffled halibut. Sharone was also told that if he could cook the dish to a better standard than Cora herself, he would get a direct entry into the final four. The judges did not consider Sharone's dish better than Cora's own version. Jake was the winner of this challenge.; Winner: Jake Gandolfo; Bottom three: Faruq Jenkins, Mike Kim and Slim Huynh; Eliminated: Faruq Jenkins
7	7	"Top 11 compete, Part 2"	August 25, 2010	n/a
Team Challenge: The teams had to cook hamburgers for 100 truckers. The truckers themselves would vote for the winner. As the Blue Team captain, Jake chose Tracy, Whitney, Lee and Tony, leaving Sharone, Mike, David, Slim, and Sheetal as the Red team, with Sharone again becoming the captain. The Red Team won the challenge.; Team Challenge Winners/Immune: David Miller, Mike Kim, Sharone Hakman, Sheetal Bhagat and Slim Huynh; Pressure Test: The Blue team members were tasked with identifying ingredients, some everyday, and some exotic. Whoever identified the fewest items before getting one wrong would be sent home.; Eliminated: Tony Carbone
8	8	"Top 9 compete, Part 1"	September 1, 2010	n/a
Mystery Box Challenge: All contestants were required to use a live Dungeness crab. Sharone, Lee and Sheetal were the top three. The judges named Lee as the best overall dish.; Challenge Winner: Lee Knaz; Elimination Test: Lee would choose one of three ingredients to work with and Lee selected passion fruit. Lee was judged to be the winner.; Winner: Lee Knaz; Bottom four: Sheetal Bhagat, Slim Huynh, Tracy Nailor and Whitney Miller; Eliminated: Slim Huynh
9	9	"Top 9 compete, Part 2"	September 1, 2010	n/a
Team Challenge: This team challenge was to cook for 230 guests at a wedding reception. Lee led the Blue Team and chose Mike, Jake and Tracy to join him, leaving Sharone, Whitney, David and Sheetal to form the Red Team. Sharone took charge of the Red Team once again. The Red Team were announced as the winners.; Team Challenge Winners/Immune: David Miller, Sharone Hakman, Sheetal Bhagat and Whitney Miller; Pressure Test: The Blue Team members were given 90 minutes to cook a pasta dish.; Bottom three: Jake Gandolfo, Lee Knaz and Tracy Nailor; Eliminated: Jake Gandolfo and Tracy Nailor
10	10	"Top 6 Compete, Part 1"	September 8, 2010	n/a
Mystery Box: This Mystery Box highlighted venison. Sharone, Sheetal and Whitney were selected as the top three. Sheetal's dish was judged to be the best.; Challenge Winner: Sheetal Bhagat; Elimination Test: Sheetal was told that the theme for this test would be dessert. She chose vanilla for everyone to work with. Whitney's dessert won her the test.; Winner: Whitney Miller; Bottom three: Lee Knaz, Mike Kim and Sheetal Bhagat; Eliminated: Mike Kim
11	11	"Top 6 Compete, Part 2"	September 8, 2010	n/a
Individual Challenge: The final five were told to prepare a dish for three professional food critics. Whitney had an hour and a quarter in which to cook her food, while the other four contestants had just an hour. David's dish was judged to be the best. Sharone and Whitney scored the lowest, becoming the bottom two.; Challenge Winner: David Miller; Bottom two: Sharone Hakman and Whitney Miller; Pressure Test: Sharone and Whitney were each asked to cook a chocolate soufflé.; Eliminated: Sharone Hakman
12	12	"Winner Revealed, Part 1"	September 15, 2010	n/a
Semi-Final 1: The episode began with the first of two one-on-one cook-offs. The challenges were decided by a draw: Ramsay picked David who was allowed to choose his competition, selecting Sheetal. In the semi-finals, the judges would each name a dish for the contestants to cook. David won sending Sheetal home.; Eliminated: Sheetal Bhagat; Semi-Final 2: For the second semi-final, Lee and Whitney were again asked to make three dishes chosen by the judges. Whitney advanced through to the final, eliminating Lee.; Eliminated: Lee Knaz
13	13	"Winner Revealed, Part 2"	September 15, 2010	n/a
Final: In the final cook-off, the two finalists were given two hours to cook whatever they desired for an appetizer, an entrée and a dessert. Whitney chose an appetizer of sweet shrimp on crispy corn bread with black eyed pea purée, country fried chicken for the entrée, and a white chocolate bread pudding for dessert. David decided to cook a sea scallop ceviche with a cream of pea and mint soup for the appetizer, beef Wellington for the entrée, and a nectarine crepe suzette for dessert.; Final Two: David Miller and Whitney Miller; Winner Chosen: Whitney was chosen as the first winner of the revival version of MasterChef.; MasterChef Winner: Whitney Miller
