= Chris Santos =

American chef and business owner

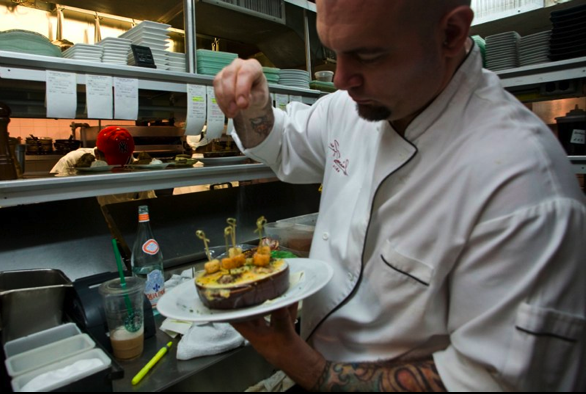
- Born: Fall River, Massachusetts, US
- Education: Johnson & Wales University
- Spouse: Natalie Makenna (m. 2022)
- Culinary career
- Current restaurants
- Stanton Social Prime at Caesars Palace in Las Vegas; Beauty & Essex (New York City, Las Vegas, Los Angeles)
- Television show
- Chopped
- Website: www.thisischrissantos.com

Chris Santos is a New York City chef and the former executive chef and owner of The Stanton Social on New York's Lower East Side. In late 2010, he opened Beauty & Essex, a 250-seat, 10,000-square-foot (930 m^{2}) restaurant in the heart of the lower east side. He is a recurring guest judge on the Food Network show Chopped, and is developing a show of his own.

== Biography ==
Santos was born in Fall River, Massachusetts. His mother was of Irish descent and his father was of Portuguese ancestry. The youngest of four children, he has two brothers and one sister.

== Professional career ==
At age 13, Santos's first job in the kitchen was washing pots at a small local restaurant in his hometown of Bristol, Rhode Island. Eventually the chef moved him from the sink to the stove where he started learning how to cook in his early teens.

He attended Bristol High School in Bristol, Rhode Island, graduating in 1989. Upon graduation, Santos studied culinary arts at Johnson & Wales University in Providence, Rhode Island, initially planning on attending for only two years. However, after the school awarded him a fellowship, he remained for two more years studying restaurant and hotel management, graduating in 1993 with honors.

Even though Santos is appreciative of his culinary art training at Johnson & Wales, he considers himself to be more so a "self-taught" chef, never undergoing formal training under esteemed master chefs such as Jean Georges, Boulud, or Batali.

After graduating from Johnson & Wales, Santos moved to New York City and in 1994, he was hired by the iconic Time Café, where he eventually would become executive chef at the age of 23, remaining until 1998.

In 1999, he devoted the better part of a year visiting 14 countries and over 40 cities in Europe - which only furthered his passion and love for cooking.

In 2000, Santos returned to NYC. One of his first kitchen jobs upon returning to the US was at Boston's French-inspired Cranebook Restaurant and Tearoom. He pulled a brief stint as consulting chef for Rue 57. In November 2000, at the age of 29, Santos opened his first restaurant, Wyanoka, where he was partner and executive chef. Wyanoka, a tiny "hidden gem" of a restaurant with just 27 seats, soon had a determined and loyal following and received glowing reviews from publications such as The New York Times, where he was favorably critiqued by current food critic Sam Sifton.

In 2003, he became executive chef at award-winning Latin restaurant Suba, and the following year he held the same position at Brooklyn, New York's Mojo. Simultaneously, he was co-owner/executive chef at The Mexican Sandwich Company in Brooklyn, New York.

In January 2005, Santos opened his most successful restaurant at the time, The Stanton Social, with partners Rich Wolf and Peter Kane. This restaurant, located in New York City's Lower East Side, was very well received and has been praised in many celebrated magazines and newspapers such as Time Out New York, New York Magazine, and The New York Times. The Stanton Social introduced the world to Santos' unique brand of experiential communal dining with its expansive menu of multi-cultural small plates. It closed at the end of 2018. In 2007, he was named Star Chefs Rising Star Chef and began developing a sister-restaurant to his first smash hit.

In December 2010, Santos opened his largest restaurant to date, Beauty & Essex. The Lower East Side's M. Katz Furniture store was transformed into a bi-level restaurant and lounge with a two-story crystal chandelier and a twenty-foot skylight. Within months of opening, Beauty & Essex was voted the "Hottest Restaurant in the U.S." A destination for prominent clientele, the restaurant solidified Santos' as a celebrity chef.

In April 2013, Santos partnered with Brian Pedone to help start the business Boxing For All, Inc. The company would later develop Quiet Punch, which is a home boxing product that goes in line with Santos's love for boxing.

In January 2016, Santos is scheduled to open Vandal, his third restaurant in Manhattan's Lower East Side. Santos is working on two new restaurants in 2016 which are slated for Los Angeles and Las Vegas. In addition, he is currently working on his first cookbook, and still hopes to launch a long-rumored line of tattoo-inspired chef apparel with celebrity Tattoo Artist Michelle Myles.

In February 2016, Santos founded Blacklight Media Records, a hard rock and heavy metal label in partnership with Metal Blade Records.

On July 14, 2022, it was announced Santos will open Stanton Social Prime at Caesars Palace in Las Vegas in 2023

== Media appearances ==
=== Radio ===
- Martha Stewart Radio

=== Television ===
- Chopped - Judge Seasons 1-11
- CBS The Early Show
- The Today Show
- The Food Network's Heavyweights
- The Martha Stewart Show

== Bibliography ==
- Share: Delicious and Surprising Recipes to Pass Around Your Table (Balance, 2017) ISBN 9781455538430
