= Angie Mar =

American chef and restaurateur (born 1982)

- Born: Seattle, Washington, U.S.
- Culinary career
- Current restaurants
- Le B (formerly Les Trois Chevaux; 2021–present)
- Previous restaurant
- The Beatrice Inn (2016–2020)
- Television show
- Chopped
- Website: angie-mar.com

Angie Mar (born c. 1982) is an American chef and restaurateur. She owns and operates Le B in New York City.

== Career ==
Mar was born and raised in Seattle, Washington. Before becoming a chef, she was based in Los Angeles as a real estate agent. She moved to New York in 2010 and enrolled at the French Culinary Institute. She subsequently worked at several restaurants in Brooklyn, including Reynard, Diner, and Marlow & Sons, before becoming sous-chef at The Spotted Pig. In 2013, she became the fourth executive chef at The Beatrice Inn in Manhattan, owned by Vanity Fair writer Graydon Carter. Mar appeared on Chopped in 2015, emerging as champion in its "Grill Masters" tournament and winning $50,000 in prize money.

In 2016, she and her cousin Melissa Merrill Keary bought over The Beatrice Inn. According to Mar, the idea of a takeover was suggested by Carter and his associates. Having previously given the restaurant zero stars out of four, The New York Times critic Pete Wells praised Mar's ability to transform The Beatrice Inn into "one of the most celebratory restaurants in the city" and awarded it two stars, meaning "very good". In December 2016, Thrillist named Mar "NYC Chef of the Year for 2016". Food & Wine listed her among the year's "Best New Chefs" in 2017. In 2018, the International Culinary Center in New York—which Mar had graduated from in 2011—awarded her the Outstanding Alumni Award for Excellence in Culinary Arts. Mar appeared on a cooking segment of Late Night with Seth Meyers in August 2018. In January 2019, a former bartender at The Beatrice Inn filed a lawsuit against Mar for alleged wage theft. The lawsuit was voluntarily dismissed without prejudice. Mar's first cookbook, Butcher + Beast, was published on September 30, 2019.

On May 11, 2020, Mar appeared on the telethon Rise Up New York! in support of New York residents affected by the COVID-19 pandemic. The Beatrice Inn closed in December 2020. In July 2021, Mar opened a French restaurant, Les Trois Chevaux, in Greenwich Village. It closed and reopened as Le B in September 2023.

== Personal life ==
Mar's grandparents emigrated to the United States from China and her parents separated when she was 14. Her father, Roy, was a former naval officer and chef who worked at his sister Ruby Chow's Chinese restaurant in Seattle. He later became a dentist and died in 2018. Her mother, Nancy, was raised in both Taipei and England. Mar has two younger brothers, Chad and Conrad, whose apparel company Autumn Studios partnered with The Beatrice Inn in late 2019 to produce a limited edition apparel for the restaurant.
