= The Beatrice Inn =

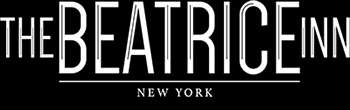

- Location of The Beatrice Inn

Restaurant information
- Closed: 2020; 6 years ago
- Owner: Angie Mar
- Head chef: Angie Mar
- Location: 285 West 12th Street, New York City, United States
- Coordinates: 40.7377°N 74.0041°W
- Seating capacity: 125
- Reservations: Yes

The Beatrice Inn was a restaurant and former nightclub in New York City. It opened in the 1920s as a speakeasy which became an Italian restaurant from the 1950s. From 2006 to 2009, it was a prominent nightclub but was shut down by law enforcement and reopened as a Spanish restaurant a year later. In 2012, Vanity Fair editor Graydon Carter assumed ownership of The Beatrice Inn. Carter sold the business to the restaurant's executive chef Angie Mar in 2016. The restaurant closed in December 2020.

== History ==
Established in the 1920s in the West Village of Lower Manhattan in New York City, The Beatrice Inn was originally a speakeasy. In the 1950s, owners Elsie and Ubaldo Cardia turned it into a restaurant serving Italian cuisine. In late 2006, The Beatrice Inn was purchased by disk jockey Paul Sevigny, graffiti artist Andrew and restaurateur Matt Abramcyk. It became a nightclub described by The Wall Street Journal as "the default West Village boite for 'Page Six'-caliber starlets, enterprising NYU students, and fashion types." In April 2009, it was raided and shut down by the Mayor's Office of Special Enforcement, following numerous noise complaints from residents living near The Beatrice Inn. The New York Times also reported that the club owed $23,000 in fines. Following its closure, a "Free the Beatrice Party" was organised by Sevigny at the nearby Cooper Square Hotel. Sevigny also announced plans to open a new club and restaurant in SoHo. In August 2015, Morgan Peterson of Harper's Bazaar listed The Beatrice Inn as one of "New York's Most Historic Nightclubs".

In 2010, the building was purchased and refurbished into a Spanish tapas restaurant by restaurateur Cobi Levy. In July 2012, the restaurant was bought over by Vanity Fair editor Graydon Carter with his partners Emil Varda and Brett Rasinski. Carter sold The Beatrice Inn to executive chef Angie Mar in August 2016 and it was reopened in September 2016. The Beatrice Inn closed in December 2020. The restaurant had four executive chefs from 2012 till its closure. Brian Nasworthy left for Picholine in early 2013 and was replaced by Aaron Zebrook. Angie Mar took over as executive chef in October 2013.

== Reception ==
In May 2013, Pete Wells of The New York Times awarded The Beatrice Inn zero stars out of four and described the menu as "awful" and "unremarkable". In October 2016, after Mar bought over the restaurant, Wells revisited The Beatrice Inn and gave it a two-star review (meaning "very good"), praising her for making "the Beatrice Inn one of the most celebratory restaurants in the city." In July 2017, Ryan Sutton, writing for Eater, found that the restaurant had been "transformed from a bastion of social exclusivity into a financial one" and was critical of the exorbitant prices; he gave The Beatrice Inn one star out of four. On the other hand, Shauna Lyon of The New Yorker, who also reviewed the restaurant in the same month, described it as a "buzzie foodie location" whose "menu is full of delicious, over-the-top bargains". The Beatrice Inn was included in the Michelin Guide New York 2020, which wrote that its "flavors are big and bold but the richness of the meat is balanced by a judicious use of herbs and fruits."
