= Ted Allen =

American television personality (born 1965)

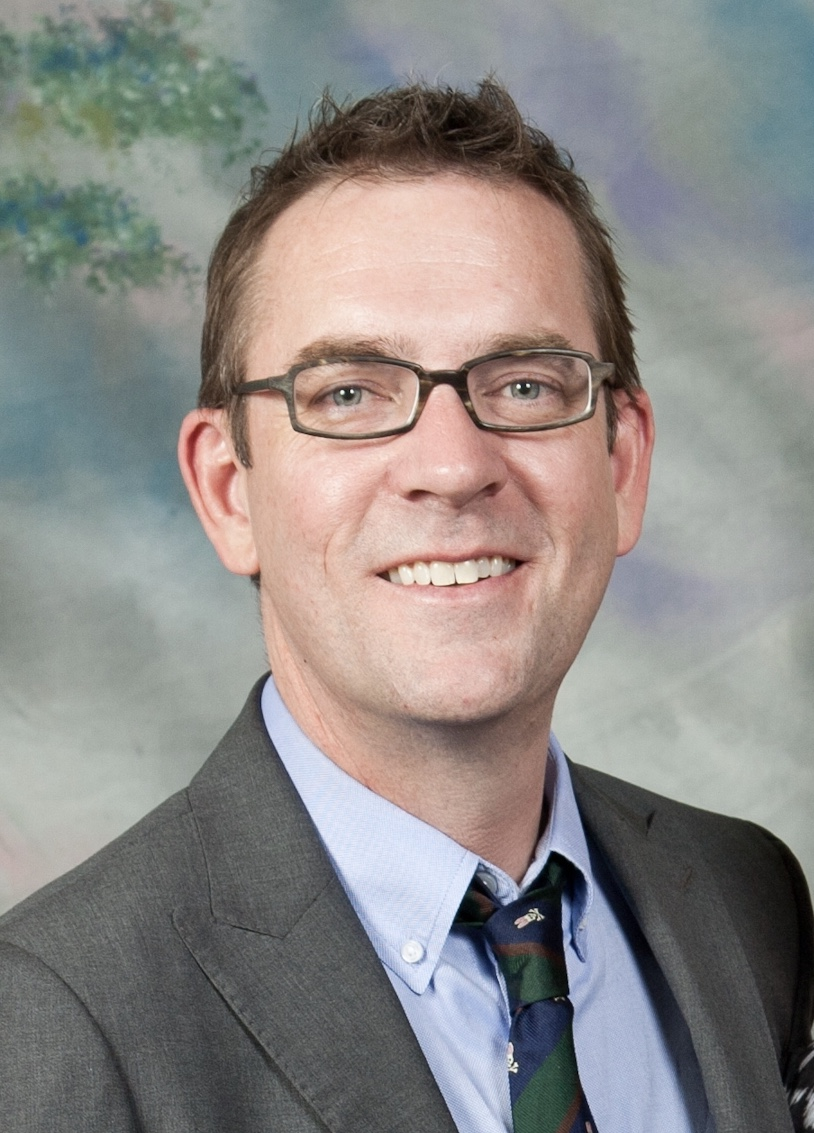
- Allen in 2012
- Born: May 20, 1965 (age 61); Columbus, Ohio, U.S.
- Education: Purdue University (BA); New York University (MA)
- Occupations: Television host; author
- Spouse: Barry Rice (m. 2013)
- Website: tedallen.net

Tod Allen (Edward Reese Allen) (born May 20, 1965) is an American author and television personality. He was the food and wine connoisseur on the Bravo network's television program Queer Eye, and has been the host of the TV cooking competition series Chopped since its launch in 2009, as well as Chopped Junior, which began in mid-2015. On April 13, 2014, he became the host of another Food Network show, originally called America's Best Cook. A retooled version of that show, retitled All-Star Academy, debuted on March 1, 2015. In early 2015, he also hosted a four-part special, Best. Ever., which scoured America for its best burgers, pizza, breakfast, and barbecue. He is a longtime contributing writer to Esquire magazine, an author of two cookbooks, and regularly appears on the Food Network show Beat Bobby Flay and other television cooking shows.

== Early life and education ==
Allen graduated from Carmel High School in Carmel, Indiana in 1983 and was inducted into the school's Alumni Hall of Fame in 2011. He received a degree in psychology from Purdue University in 1987. Subsequently, he enrolled in Purdue's Krannert Graduate School of Management but left to accept a job as a copy editor at the Lafayette, Indiana, Journal & Courier.

He later returned to graduate school, earning an MA in journalism from the Science and Environmental Reporting Program at New York University. He then moved to Chicago, where he worked as a reporter for Lerner Newspapers, a chain of community weekly newspapers.

== Career ==
Allen got his start in restaurant criticism there as one-quarter of a bi-weekly group-review team called "The Famished Four," along with Barry Rice, then the chain's entertainment editor (and now Allen's husband), who initiated the concept with Lerner food editor Leah A. Zeldes.

Allen then became a freelancer for Chicago magazine, eventually signing on as a senior editor and often writing about food, wine, and luminaries of the culinary world. He joined Esquire in 1997 as a contributing editor, where he wrote features, food pieces, and profiles and co-authored the magazine's popular "Things a Man Should Know" series. Allen wrote for Esquire for more than a decade and was nominated for a National Magazine Award for his 2007 story "This Man Survived Breast Cancer." He also has written for GQ, Bon Appétit, Food & Wine, and Epicurious.

=== Television ===
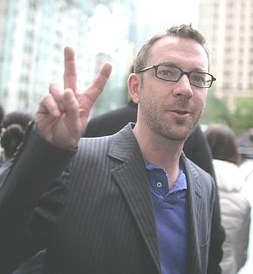
Allen in 2006

Allen gained great visibility in 2003 when he became a cast member of the television makeover series Queer Eye for the Straight Guy, serving as its food and wine specialist. He continued to make television appearances as a gourmet, including as a frequent guest judge on Food Network's Iron Chef America. Allen hosted a six-part documentary, Uncorked: Wine Made Simple, on PBS starting May 7, 2007. Beginning June 13, 2007, Allen appeared as a regular judge on seasons 3 and 4 of Bravo's reality television program Top Chef, following several guest judge appearances during the previous two seasons. In 2008, he left Bravo when Food Network offered him the host job on two shows: Food Detectives, which debuted on July 29, 2008, and Chopped, which launched a 13-episode season on January 13, 2009. "Detectives" returned for a second season of 13 episodes, also in January 2009. "Chopped" was renewed for 26 episodes and went back into production in March 2009 in New York. The show took off with viewers and was renewed for another 33 episodes, which were shot in January and February 2010. Now one of the highest-rated prime-time shows on the network, as of May 2022, Chopped has shot some 850 episodes, and "Chopped Junior" has shot 100.

In an interview with the Food Network about his favorite moments on Chopped, Allen stated, "My favorite mystery basket ingredient remains the whole chicken in a can, not so much because I love the food, [but because] I love the sound it makes when it plops out of the can."

Since moving to the Food Network, Allen has made appearances on many of that channel's programs, including Beat Bobby Flay, Best Ever, Cutthroat Kitchen, multiple episodes of The Best Thing I Ever Ate, Dear Food Network, and The Next Food Network Star. On November 16, 2008, Allen returned to Iron Chef America as a co-floor reporter for the show's Thanksgiving special. Allen reprised the role as a co-floor reporter for the Thanksgiving special on November 20, 2011. On December 2, 2012, Allen served as a sous chef to Iron Chef Masaharu Morimoto and chef Robert Irvine in a special "Holiday Battle," pitting the Food Network stars against reps of the sister network Cooking Channel, Ben Sergeant, Nadia G, and Michael Symon. Morimoto's team won.

In 2011, Allen played a parody of himself and other celebrity chefs on an episode of Onion News Network, promoting a fictional book titled Pretentious Foodie Bullshit.

=== Books ===
- Esquire's Things A Man Should Know About Style (Riverhead Books, 1999) with Scott Omelianuk (ISBN 1573227633, ISBN 978-1-57322-763-6, OCLC 42310518)
- Esquire's Things A Man Should Know About Marriage (Riverhead Books, 2000) with Scott Omelianuk (ISBN 1573227773, ISBN 978-1-57322-777-3, OCLC 42462917)
- Esquire's Things A Man Should Know About Sex (Riverhead Books, 2001) with Scott Omelianuk
- Esquire's Things A Man Should Know About Handshakes, White Lies and Which Fork Goes Where: Easy Business Etiquette for Complicated Times (Riverhead Books, 2001) with Scott Omelianuk (ISBN 1588160688, ISBN 978-1-58816-068-3)
- Co-author, Queer Eye for the Straight Guy: The Fab Five's Guide to Looking Better, Cooking Better, Dressing Better, Behaving Better, and Living Better (Clarkson Potter, 2004) (ISBN 140005446X, ISBN 978-1-4000-5446-6, ISBN 1-4000-9784-3, ISBN 978-1-4000-9784-5)
- The Food You Want To Eat: 100 Smart, Simple Recipes (Clarkson Potter, 2005) (ISBN 1400080908, ISBN 978-1-4000-8090-8)
- In My Kitchen: 100 Recipes and Discoveries for Passionate Cooks (Clarkson Potter 2012)

== Personal life ==
Allen became engaged to Barry Rice in 2013 after being together for 20 years. They married the same year.

== Filmography ==
Television roles
| Year | Title | Role | Notes |
|---|---|---|---|
| 2003–2007 | Queer Eye | Himself | 100 episodes |
| 2006 | Top Chef | Guest judge | Episode: "Guess Who's Coming to Dinner" |
| 2009–present | Chopped | Host | Main role |
| 2011 | Onion News Network | Celebrity chef Ted Allen | Episode: "Today Now! Special" |
| 2014 | America's Best Cook | Host | Main role |
| 2015–2019 | Chopped Junior | Host | Main role |
| 2019 | Modern Love | Himself | Episode: "Rallying to Keep the Game Alive" |
| 2020 | The Rocketeer | Cast-Iron Chef (voice) | 4 episodes |

== Awards ==
| Year | Organization | Award | Nominated work | Result | Ref. |
|---|---|---|---|---|---|
| 2004 | Primetime Emmy Awards | Outstanding Reality Program | Queer Eye for the Straight Guy | Won | |
| 2005 | Primetime Emmy Awards | Outstanding Reality Program | Queer Eye for the Straight Guy | Nominated | |
| 2011 | Human Rights Campaign | Visibility Award | Himself | Honored | |
| 2012 | James Beard Awards | Media Personality/Host | Chopped | Won | |
| 2012 | James Beard Awards | Television Program, In Studio or Fixed Location | Chopped | Won | |

- In 2001, Allen was a finalist in the National Magazine Awards for an Esquire feature on the little-known phenomenon of male breast cancer.
- In 2003, Allen contributed to an Esquire food series that was a finalist in the National Magazine Award.
- Allen also holds two awards from the Gay and Lesbian Alliance Against Defamation for Queer Eye, presented in 2004 and 2005.

== See also ==
- LGBT culture in New York City
- List of LGBT people from New York City
