= David Guas =

American chef (born 1975)

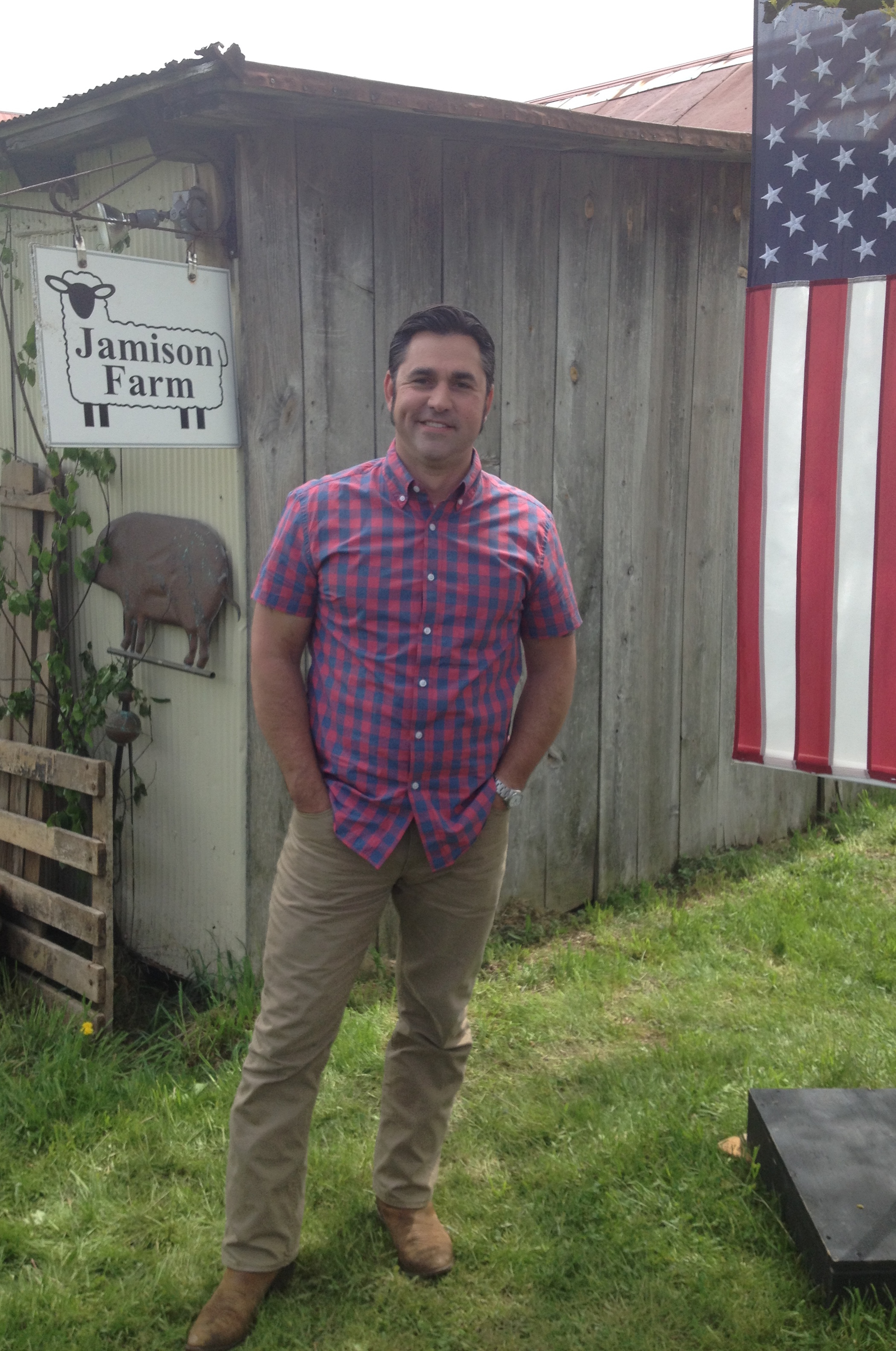
- David Guas in Latrobe, PA on set of "American Grilled"
- Born: June 5, 1975 (age 51); New Orleans, Louisiana
- Occupations: Chef, TV Personality, Restaurateur, Cookbook Author
- Style: Southern
- Spouse: Simone Rathlé Guas (m. 1999)
- Children: Kemp (b. 2002); Spencer (b. 2004)
- Website: www.chefdavidguas.com www.bayoubakerydc.com

David Guas (born June 5, 1975) is a chef, TV personality, restaurateur and cookbook author from New Orleans, Louisiana.

== Biography ==
David Guas grew up in New Orleans. He exchanged his ten-year tenure as a corporate pastry chef for an entrepreneurial path in 2007 and worked in private consulting, boutique catering, cookbook authoring, and opened his New Orleans style eatery in November 2010: Bayou Bakery Coffee Bar & Eatery. His first cookbook, DamGoodSweet - Desserts to Satisfy Your Sweet Tooth New Orleans Style (Taunton Press, 2009) was named one of Food & Wine’s “Best New Dessert Cookbooks”.; was a finalist for both the James Beard Award in the Baking and Dessert Cookbook category. and the International Association of Culinary Professionals Cookbook Award in the American Category;.

== Restaurants ==
He is the owner of Bayou Bakery, Coffee Bar & Eatery in Arlington, Virginia. which opened in 2010. Guas has garnered national praise in publications like Food & Wine, Southern Living, Garden & Gun, Saveur, and Bon Appétit for showcasing the soul of the South in his sinfully delicious, Louisiana-style favorites and signature desserts. In 2019, the restaurant was recognized with the Arlington Best Business Award for Retail Small Business of the Year. And in 2019, the Wild American Shrimp Processors Association named David Guas Chef of the Year.

In 2014, Guas opened a second location of Bayou bakery, Coffee Bar & Eatery located in Capitol Hill, occupying the historic carriage house that housed the horse-drawn ambulance and medic team commissioned by President Abraham Lincoln the year before his death. The renovations received the 2015 Award of Excellence in Historic Resources from the American Institute of Architects in Washington, DC. Chef David Guas let go of the lease two years after its opening.

In 2017, Guas opened Lil' B inside The Darcy Hotel in Washington, DC. The Darcy Hotel sold in December 2018, and the contract ended early 2019.

== Television and Press ==
In April 2014, Travel Channel announced David Guas as the host of the new series American Grilled, which premiered July 2, 2014.

Guas has made constant appearances on The Today Show close to 25 times. He has also appeared on CBS This Morning, Saturday: The Dish and CBS, The Talk and The hosts of The Talk named Guas as one of the hottest guest chefs in that year. His restaurant was showcased on the Cooking Channel’s Unique Sweets. He has appeared as a contestant and later as a judge on Food Network’s Chopped and has appeared multiple times as a judge on Food Network's Chopped Jr. "

Guas was a two-time finalist for Food & Wine Magazine’s People’s Best New Chef in the Country.

Food & Wine also named Bayou Bakery’s Muff-a-Lotta one of the “Best Sandwiches in the U.S.", and later showcased the chef and his father in an eight-page feature detailing their travels to Cuba. Guas was named the Restaurant Association of Metropolitan Washington’s Pastry Chef of the Year and Arlington Magazine featured Guas on the cover as “Best Chef of Arlington” in January 2014.

== Community service ==
Guas served on the board of Best Buddies of Virginia and the Southern Food and Beverage Museum in New Orleans; was chosen by the U.S. State Department to participate in its Diplomatic Culinary Partnership Initiative from 2012 - 2016; is a member of the Southern Foodways Alliance; Slow Food USA; Share Our Strength; a participating chef with Chefs for Equality; co-founder of the non-profit Chefs Feeding Families; served as a spokesperson for The National Honey Board for 8 years; served on the advisory council of the Atlanta Food & Wine Festival for 5 years; and is a founding member of District Hogs - group of local restaurant professionals who ride their motorcycles for fun, research, and charity.

Guas launched the FIRST rapid relief response in the DMV, on March 17, 2020, to feed local students and families nutritious, plant-based meals. As a New Orleans native - following the loss of his family’s home and the devastation of his community in the aftermath of Katrina - Guas knew how to create a makeshift kitchen outside, so he went rogue and started cooking. The relief effort has since grown into a far-reaching, highly-coordinated initiative - Chefs Feeding Families - formed in collaboration with the non-profit organization, Real Food for Kids, which not only supports feeding students, but also supports employment in the restaurant community. It wasn't long before Guas began enlisting county officials, local community groups, and PTAs to help grow the program - bringing on culinary partners and opening distribution sites across the region. It has served over 203 thousand meals since launching in March 2020. The success of Chefs Feeding Families garnered national recognition from Squawk Box on CNBC and the Aspen Institute, to name a few.

Guas became involved with The Community Spoon, an organisation providing prepared meals and groceries to Afghan refugees who had recently arrived in Northern Virginia. Working with his team, he supplied vegetarian meals to Lutheran Social Services of the National Capital Area, which distributed them to refugee families. The initiative focused on supporting newly arrived refugees through culturally considerate, home-cooked meals, addressing immediate nutritional needs following displacement from their homes.

His efforts to combat food insecurity was recognized in 2020 by the Aspen Institute and Arlington County which named him a “Community Weaver,” and in 2021 he received the Good Neighbor Award from the Restaurant Association of Metropolitan Washington, DC. In 2021, Guas was selected as a member of the Food Security Task Force, in partnership with Arlington County Department of Human Services, developing an integrated food security system. And in 2022, Guas was honored with the Arlington County COVID Hero Award, which recognizes community members who have gone above and beyond to make sure their neighbors have been safe and supported throughout the pandemic.

== Personal life ==
Guas resides in Northern Virginia with his wife, Public Relations professional, Simone Rathlé. and has two sons, Spencer and Kemp. He is a hunter, fisherman, and motorcyclist. He rides a Harley-Davidson.

== Bibliography ==
- Guas, David; Raquel Pelzel (2009). DamGood Sweet: Desserts to Satisfy Your Sweet Tooth, New Orleans Style. Newtown, Connecticut: Taunton Press. pp. 60–64. ISBN 978-1-60085-118-6.
- Guas, David (2015). "Grill Nation: 200 Surefire Recipes, Tips, and Techniques to Grill Like a Pro." Birmingham, Alabama: Oxmoor House. ISBN 978-0848746384
