= Chopped (TV series) =

American reality cooking television show

- Genre: Cooking show
- Created by: Linda Lea; Dave Noll; Michael Krupat
- Directed by: Michael Pearlman
- Presented by: Ted Allen
- Country of origin: United States
- Original language: English
- No. of seasons: 61
- No. of episodes: 749 + 39 specials (list of episodes)

Production
- Executive producer: Linda Lea
- Producers: Amy Stanford; Noah Odabashian; Nassdja Valentin; Janet Pirchio; Sarah Douglass; Beth Paholak; Kate Kenny; Laurie Benner; Adam Lienhardt
- Editors: Russ Mendelson; Evald Ridore; Jonathan Soule; Amanda Durett Cercone; Erik Klein; Matt Hollywood; Brad Yankus; Jimmy Drakulias (online editor); Axuve Espinosa; Michael Wei; Gregory Corwin; Evan Wise; Brian D'Amico; Mike Stern; Barney Schmidt; Brian Gale
- Running time: 42 minutes
- Production company: Notional

Original release
- Network: Food Network
- Release: January 13, 2009 – present

Chopped is an American reality-based cooking television game show series created by Michael Krupat, Dave Noll and Linda Lea. It is hosted by Ted Allen. The series pits four chefs against each other as they compete for a chance to win $10,000. The series debuted in 2009, and episodes air every Tuesday at 8 p.m. ET on Food Network.

A dessert-themed spin-off titled Chopped Sweets premiered on February 3, 2020, with Scott Conant as host.

== Format ==
In each episode, four chefs compete in a three-round contest, where they attempt to incorporate unusual combinations of ingredients into dishes that are later evaluated by a panel of three judges. At the beginning of each round (typically "Appetizer", "Entrée", and "Dessert", but with occasional exceptions), the chefs are each given a basket containing four mystery ingredients and are expected to create dishes that use all of them in some way. Although failing to use an ingredient is not an automatic disqualification, the judges do take such omissions into account when making their decisions. The ingredients are often not commonly prepared together. For example, in the episode "Yucca, Watermelon, Tortillas," the Appetizer ingredients consisted of watermelon, canned sardines, pepper jack cheese, and zucchini. Each chef has their own stations for preparing and cooking food, and the general kitchen also includes a variety of specialized tools and equipment for the chefs' use, such as a deep fryer, a blast chiller, and an ice cream machine. The chefs are given unlimited access to a pantry and refrigerator stocked with a wide variety of other ingredients. Before each round begins, they are allowed to preheat their ovens and boil pots of water on their stovetops as a time-saving measure.

Each round has a time limit, typically 20 minutes for Appetizer, and 30 minutes each for Entrée and Dessert. These limits have been altered on occasion for special-format episodes and for rounds in which one or more mystery ingredients require additional preparation/cooking time. The chefs must cook their dishes and complete four platings (three for the judges and one "beauty plate") before time runs out. Once time has expired, the judges critique the dishes based on presentation, taste and creativity and select one chef to be "chopped" - eliminated from the competition with no winnings. Allen reveals the judges' decision by lifting a cloche on their table to show the eliminated chef's dish, and one judge comments on the reasoning behind the choice. The Appetizer and Entrée rounds are judged independently from one another, while in the Dessert round, the judges consider the chefs' overall performance during the entire competition. The winner receives $10,000, but special competitions and tournaments have featured larger cash prizes.

== Production notes ==
According to host Ted Allen, the show's unaired pilot episode was "...originally a lot more elaborate. It was set in a mansion, the host was a butler (played by Christopher Flockton, narrator of VH1's The Fabulous Life), the butler held a Chihuahua, and when a chef was chopped the losing dish was fed to the Chihuahua." The Food Network found the pilot episode "a little too weird", but decided to keep the general premise of the show in a more straightforward competition format.

An episode of Chopped takes approximately 12 hours to tape, with deliberations after each round taking about 20 minutes. Judging is done by consensus among the judges.

While contestants do not know the ingredients ahead of time, they are given a tour of the kitchen prior to taping. Some preliminary tasks, such as preheating ovens and bringing water to a boil, are done in advance of each round.

Chefs must be 19 years or older to appear on the regular show. Teenagers and children are occasionally invited to compete in special episodes.

Medical personnel are present in the studio to treat any injuries sustained by the chefs and may, at their discretion, disqualify a chef who appears unable to continue safely in the competition. If a chef is disqualified, the judges do not chop any of the others in that round but do still critique their dishes as part of the overall evaluation.

If the judges consider a dish to be unsafe to eat for any reason, such as contamination by blood or other bodily fluids, they do not taste it but may still evaluate it on presentation and creativity.

== Special episodes ==
=== Chopped Champions ===
Starting September 8, 2009, Food Network aired a four-episode Chopped Champions tournament, in which 13 previous winners were invited to face off again. Four chefs competed per episode; the three losing chefs were eliminated from the tournament, while the winner received $10,000 and faced three new competitors in the next episode.

As of February 2020, the network has aired six additional Chopped Champions tournaments, each consisting of four preliminary heats and a finale. Four previous champions compete in each preliminary heat; the winner receives no money, but secures a slot in the finale to compete for a $50,000 grand prize.

=== Chopped All-Stars ===
Starting March 6, 2011, and continuing for four additional episodes, Food Network aired the "Chopped All-Stars" Tournament. Sixteen chefs competed. The first four episodes featured four types of chef: The Next Food Network Star contestants, Food Network celebrities, celebrity chefs, and Chopped judges. The winners of those four episodes then competed against each other in the "Grand Finale", where the winner received $50,000 to donate to a charity of their choice. Nate Appleman, a celebrity chef, won the competition and donated his $50,000 to Kawasaki Disease research, a disease from which his son suffered.

Starting April 8, 2012, and continuing for four additional episodes, Food Network aired the second "Chopped All-Stars" Tournament. Sixteen new chefs competed, again ranging from four different categories of chef: Iron Chef America chefs (the newest of the four categories), Food Network and Cooking Channel celebrities, The Next Food Network Star contestants, and Chopped judges. Celebrity chef & Chopped judge Marcus Samuelsson won this second competition, donating the $50,000 grand prize to the Careers Through Culinary Arts Program of New York (aka C-CAP), which helps under-served youth through culinary arts education and employment.

On April 7, 2013, the third installment of the "Chopped All-Stars" Tournament premiered on Food Network. Over the course of four episodes, sixteen chefs competed in groups of four. There were four different categories of the chefs through the episodes: Food Network vs. Cooking Channel, Mega Chefs, Chopped Judges, and celebrities, respectively. Winners of each of these rounds went on to compete against each other in the "Grand Finale" episode, where the winner received $50,000 to donate to a charity of their choice. Celebrity chef and Chopped judge Scott Conant won this competition, donating $50,000 to the Keep Memory Alive Foundation.

On April 28, 2015, the fourth "All-Stars" Tournament began airing, with an increased grand prize of $75,000 to the winner. As before, they are split into groups of four chefs per episode, with the winner of each of the first four episodes competing in the fifth "Grand Finale" episode for the top prize. Unlike previous tournaments, however, the 16 chefs involved were not split into "categories", but were sorted in what seems to be a more random fashion. The winner was Anne Burrell who was playing for the Juvenile Diabetes Research Foundation.

=== Chopped Grill Masters ===
Starting July 22, 2012, and continuing for four additional episodes, Food Network aired the "Chopped Grill Masters" Tournament. Sixteen "pro" grillers competed. The winners of the first four episodes competed against each other in the "Grand Finale" for a $50,000 prize. The "Grill Masters" episodes were taped outdoors at Old Tucson Studios near Tucson, AZ. The winner was Ernest Servantes, Executive Chef at Texas Lutheran University and Pit Boss at Burnt Bean Company.

In the summer of 2015, a second "Grill Masters" Tournament occurred, and was sponsored by Lea & Perrins. Like the previous "Grill Masters" Tournament, it was filmed on location and 16 "pro" grillers competed. The 4 preliminary heat winners advanced to the finals where they would compete for a $50,000 grand prize. The winner was Angie Mar.

On July 5, 2016 another five-part "Grill Masters" Tournament premiered. This tournament was taped at the Beringer Vineyards in St. Helena, CA, and featured 16 "pro" grillers. In contrast to past tournaments, the four finalists each won a guaranteed $10,000 for winning their heat, and the finalists competed to win another $50,000 for a total grand prize of $60,000. The winner of this tournament was Sophina Uong.

=== Chopped Tournament of Stars ===
During Season 19, Chopped held a 5-part "Tournament of Stars". It was identical in format to the "All Stars" Tournaments, with 16 celebrities competing to win $50,000 for charity. The contestants were divided into 4 categorical groups for the first four episodes (sports stars, Rachael vs. Guy finalists, comedians, and actors, respectively). Winner Michael Imperioli donated his winnings to the Pure Land Project, an organization that helps build and maintain schools in rural Tibet.

=== Chopped Ultimate Champions ===
During Season 21, a 5-part "Ultimate Champions" Tournament was held, featuring 16 returning champions (12 amateurs and 4 professional chefs) competing to win $50,000, plus a new car of the winners choice from Buick. Like most celebrity tournaments, the returning champions were divided into 4 categorical groups for the first four episodes (professionals, amateur champs, heroes, and celebrities, respectively). The winner was Diana Sabater. The finale of this tournament also marked the first time that both civilian and celebrity contestants competed in the same episode.

=== Chopped: Impossible ===
In the fall of 2015, Chopped aired a four-part "Chopped: Impossible" Tournament in which 12 former champions were invited back to compete for a grand prize of up to $40,000. Each basket contained ingredient combinations that were specifically chosen to be more difficult than usual. Four chefs competed in each of three preliminary heats, with Restaurant: Impossible host Robert Irvine as one of the three judges. The winners advanced to a two-round finale (Appetizer and Entrée), in which Irvine observed their cooking but did not serve as a judge. The winner of the finale received $15,000 and competed directly against Irvine in a "Wild Card Entrée" round, receiving an additional $25,000 if his/her dish was judged superior to Irvine's.

=== Teen Tournaments ===
Three five-part Teen Tournaments have been held to date, in seasons 21, 25 and 29, following the same structure as other tournaments. Four teen chefs competed in each preliminary heat, with the winners advancing to the finale. Prizes were awarded in the finale as follows:

- Season 21: $25,000 cash and a $40,000 culinary school scholarship for the winner; $1,000 FoodNetwork.com gift certificate for each of the other finalists
- Seasons 25 and 29: $25,000 cash for the winner; $1,000 FoodNetwork.com gift certificate and a show-branded chef's jacket for each of the other finalists

=== Chopped After Hours ===
Chopped After Hours is a spin-off series that premiered on September 15, 2015 and airs at 11 p.m. ET on Tuesdays. Episodes consist of three segments, each featuring judges from a different Chopped episode as they prepare dishes using one of the mystery ingredient baskets given to the original contestants. The second season premiered on July 5, 2016.

=== Chopped Star Power ===
In season 33, Chopped will be holding a tournament consisting of 16 celebrities divided into four categories: internet celebrities, athletes, comedians, and TV and film stars, with a grand prize of $50,000 for charity. The event began on March 28, 2017.

=== Chopped: Sweets Showdown ===
On September 5, 2019, it was announced that a five-episode stunt titled Chopped: Sweets Showdown will premiere on October 1, 2019.

=== Chopped: Beat the Judge ===
On April 7, 2020, the 47th season premiered with a series of episodes titled Chopped: Beat the Judge. Three champions from previous episodes compete through the Appetizer and Entrée rounds. Allen then announces the format for the third round, in which the remaining chef competes against a Chopped judge for the $10,000 prize.

=== Chopped: Desperately Seeking Sous-Chef ===
On May 31, 2022, 16 chefs competed in a five-episode tournament judged by Maneet Chauhan, Scott Conant, and Chris Santos. The winners of four preliminary heats advanced to the finale, in which the winner became a sous-chef at a restaurant owned by the judge of his/her choice.

=== Other special episodes ===
Chopped Amateurs features contestants who do not have professional training or schooling; most are self-taught.

Celebrity episodes: four celebrities competing for charity. Some episodes have featured teens or children competing. Occasionally the prize is a scholarship to a culinary school. Losing contestants on these episodes often receive a consolation prize, typically a $1,000 shopping spree on foodnetwork.com. On one occurrence the prize was a $40,000 scholarship, the runner-up received a $20,000 scholarship while the other two contestants each received a $5,000 scholarship. Holiday themed episodes have also occurred featuring holiday inspired ingredients (such as a chocolate Santa on a Christmas episode or candy blood on a Halloween show) and the contestants are asked to prepare holiday themed dishes. There were also several themed episodes with non-holiday themes. These themes were based on either themed ingredients (e.g. spicy foods), world cuisines (e.g. Italian, Australian, New Orleans), chefs with the same background (notably, redemption episodes featuring former contestants that got "chopped" in their first appearances), or a combination.

== Judges ==
=== Regular judges ===
The following judges have appeared in four or more seasons:

Regular Judges of Chopped
Judge	Seasons																																																			
Judge	Specials	1	2	3	4	5	6	7	8	9	10	11	12	13	14	15	16	17	18	19	20	21	22	23	24	25	26	27	28	29	30	31	32	33	34	35	36	37	38	39	40	41	42	43	44	45	46	47	48	49	50	51
Amanda Freitag	♦	1-51																																																		
Alex Guarnaschelli	♦	1-46																																														(Note: In Season 47, Alex Guarnaschelli competed in episode "Beat the Judge: Alex", but did not judge in any episodes.)			50	
Geoffrey Zakarian	♦	1-33																																		35-49																51
Marc Murphy	♦	1-26																											28-47																					49-51		
Aarón Sanchez	♦	1-32																																																		
Chris Santos	♦	1-29																														31-32				35-51																
Scott Conant	♦	1-4					6			9-11				13-51																																						
Marcus Samuelsson	♦				4-6					9-18															24-28						30-42																	47		49-50		
Maneet Chauhan	♦						6-7			9-51																																										
Elizabeth Karmel	♦										10		12			15-16							22																													
Christian Petroni																												27-29																		45		47-48				51
Eddie Jackson																												27					32-33															47-48				
Angie Mar																													28									37				41		43-45								
Giorgio Rapicavoli																															30														44-46							
Tiffani Faison	♦																																			35			38-40				42				46-51					
Jordan Andino																																				35		37-38													50	
Martha Stewart																																					36		38-43											49		

=== Guest judges ===
The following judges have appeared in three or fewer seasons:

Guest Judges of Chopped
Judge	Season Appearances		
Judge	First	Second	Third
Hugh Acheson	34		
Eric Adjepong	50		
Einat Admony	35		
Nick Anderer	27		
Sunny Anderson	50		
Cheryl Barbara	17		
Florian Bellanger	43		
Ron Ben-Israel	17		
Michelle Bernstein	18	22	48
Valerie Bertinelli	43		
Jamie Bissonnette	45		
Mark Bittman	3		
Janine Booth	28		
James Briscione	38		
Alton Brown	Specials	34	50
Joseph Brown	18		
Anne Burrell	10	29	
David Burtka	45		
Marco Canora	13		
Josh Capon	3		
Natasha Case	22		
Moe Cason	Specials	43	
Michael Chernow	22		
Chris Cheung	27		
Esther Choi	45		
Michael Chiarello	Specials		
Leah Cohen	31		
Melissa Cookston	Specials		
Giada De Laurentiis	Specials		
Tiffany Derry	51		
Bruno DiFabio	18		
Rocco DiSpirito	24		
Wylie Dufresne	34		
Tino Feliciano	27		
Susan Feniger	9		
Darnell Ferguson	50		
Bobby Flay	Specials	31	47
Claudia Fleming	12		
Marc Forgione	35		
Aaron Franklin	Specials		
Edi Frauneder	20	25	
Evan Funke	39		
Jose Garces	35		
Eduardo Garcia	43	46	50
Ray Garcia	45		
Lauren Gerrie	35		
David Guas	35	37	
Neil Patrick Harris	46		
Elizabeth Heiskell	34		
Robert Irvine	Specials		
Johnny Iuzzini	26		
Stephanie Izard	37		
Joseph "JJ" Johnson	35		
Sam Kass	9	13	
Ali Khan	34		
Jason Kieffer	36		
Hooni Kim	18		
Kristen Kish	46		
Christopher Knight	43		
Ulrich Koberstein	28		
Greg Koch	18		
John Koch	Specials		
Ray Lampe	23		
Edward Lee	29		
John Li	15	20	
David Loewenberg	28		
Antonia Lofaso	51		
Mike Lookinland	43		
Tim Love	Specials		
Tyler Malek	37		
Nick Mangold	44		
Katrina Markoff	32		
Jeff Mauro	23	37	
Maureen McCormick	43		
Rose McGowan	44		
Spike Mendelsohn	18		
George Mendes	34		
Amy Mills	Specials		
Myron Mixon	Specials		
Roger Mooking	24		
Adam Moskowitz	23		
Nilou Motamed	48	51	
Seamus Mullen	9	11	38
Kimbal Musk	44		
Ayesha Nurdjaja	45		
Stuart O'Keeffe	37		
Peter Oleyer	21		
Susan Olsen	43		
Kwami Onwuachi	51		
Ken Oringer	7		
Millie Peartree	50		
Zakary Pelaccio	8	9	11
Eve Plumb	43		
Michael Psilakis	35		
Erik Ramirez	45		
Hans Röckenwagner	37		
Missy Robbins	10	11	
Silvena Rowe	18		
Craig Samuel	29		
Claudia Sandoval	51		
Jonathon Sawyer	31	33	36
Ernest Servantes	Specials		
Thiago Silva	45		
Nancy Silverton	34		
Adam Sobel	18	36	
Alex Stupak	18	21	23
John Suley	27		
Justin Sutherland	51		
James Tahhan	32		
Dale Talde	31	35	
Liz Thorpe	41		
Jet Tila	13		
Sue Torres	3	5	
Christina Tosi	18	22	23
Kari Underly	38		
Laura Vitale	30		
Sylvia Weinstock	43		
Barry Williams	43		
Jody Williams	2	3	4
Brooke Williamson	51		
Lee Anne Wong	13	14	
Zac Young	32	36	43
Andrew Zimmern	22		

== Episodes ==
Season	Episodes	Originally released	
Season	Episodes	First released	Last released
1	13	January 13, 2009	April 7, 2009
2	13	June 16, 2009	September 29, 2009
3	13	October 13, 2009	March 9, 2010
4	13	April 6, 2010	July 13, 2010
5	13	July 20, 2010	November 28, 2010
6	12	January 4, 2011	April 26, 2011
7	10	May 3, 2011	July 5, 2011
8	9	July 12, 2011	December 6, 2011
9	13	August 30, 2011	December 13, 2011
10	13	December 20, 2011	May 29, 2012
11	13	February 7, 2012	November 25, 2012
12	13	June 5, 2012	November 20, 2012
13	12	September 4, 2012	February 26, 2013
14	13	January 6, 2013	May 5, 2013
15	13	April 2, 2013	July 23, 2013
16	13	June 2, 2013	November 12, 2013
17	13	August 13, 2013	December 3, 2013
18	13	November 26, 2013	May 13, 2014
19	13	February 4, 2014	June 10, 2014
20	13	March 18, 2014	November 25, 2014
21	13	July 15, 2014	January 13, 2015
22	13	October 14, 2014	June 30, 2015
23	13	December 16, 2014	June 16, 2015
24	13	April 28, 2015	December 8, 2015
25	13	August 25, 2015	December 1, 2015
26	8	October 6, 2015	December 17, 2015
27	13	January 5, 2016	March 17, 2016
28	13	March 29, 2016	June 21, 2016
29	13	August 7, 2016	September 27, 2016
30	8	September 22, 2016	December 20, 2016
31	20	October 13, 2016	December 29, 2016
32	12	January 3, 2017	May 2, 2017
33	8	March 21, 2017	May 30, 2017
34	13	May 9, 2017	November 7, 2017
35	20	July 18, 2017	March 6, 2018
36	13	December 12, 2017	June 5, 2018
37	13	March 13, 2018	June 11, 2019
38	13	May 15, 2018	May 28, 2019
39	13	June 26, 2018	May 14, 2019
40	13	July 17, 2018	July 16, 2019
41	13	December 11, 2018	March 31, 2020
42	8	November 20, 2018	June 2, 2020
43	13	July 9, 2019	February 25, 2020
44	13	September 24, 2019	August 4, 2020
45	13	January 21, 2020	July 28, 2020
46	13	July 14, 2020	October 27, 2020
47	13	April 7, 2020	May 25, 2021
48	13	December 15, 2020	March 30, 2021
49	13	November 10, 2020	May 18, 2021
50	18	June 1, 2021	March 22, 2022
51	13	December 28, 2021	April 5, 2022
52	13	April 12, 2022	October 25, 2022
53	13	October 18, 2022	August 8, 2023
54	13	December 27, 2022	March 28, 2023
55	19	April 4, 2023	December 12, 2023
56	13	August 22, 2023	January 30, 2024
57	13	February 6, 2024	August 13, 2024
58	13	April 2, 2024	June 25, 2024
59	13	August 20, 2024	May 6, 2025
60	13	October 15, 2024	July 22, 2025
61	13	January 7, 2025	July 8, 2025
62	13	July 29, 2025	May 5, 2026

== Awards ==
Chopped won two James Beard Awards in 2012 from the James Beard Foundation: one medal for Best Show, In-Studio or Fixed Location, given to Ted Allen, the team of judges, Food Network, and producers Linda Lea, Dave Noll, and Vivian Sorenson; the other for Media Personality or Host, given to Allen. Additionally, Chopped was inducted into the Culinary Hall of Fame in 2012.

== Chopped Sweets ==
A spin-off series titled Chopped Sweets premiered on February 3, 2020, with Scott Conant as host and head judge. It follows the same three-round competition/judging structure and $10,000 prize as the original, with chefs required to make desserts in every round that adhere to a theme announced by Conant. The judging panel consists of Conant and two other judges, and the time limit is typically extended from 30 minutes to 45 to allow proper time for baking.

== Chopped Castaways ==
A spin-off series titled Chopped Castaways is scheduled to premiere on May 12, 2026. In the series, twelve chefs must live and survive on a remote island while also competing in cooking challenges. Contestants are eliminated each episode, with the remaining contestants continuing to the next episode. The format combines the elimination cooking challenges of Chopped with elements of survival reality series such as Survivor.

== International adaptations ==
=== Chopped Canada ===
Beginning on January 2, 2014, Food Network also aired a Canadian version of Chopped called Chopped Canada, which features Canadian contestants and judges. That adaptation was originally hosted by Canadian-born actor Dean McDermott for the first two seasons and was then hosted by former CFL wide receiver Brad Smith. The rules are identical to the American counterpart as is the $10,000 prize. The show was cancelled on February 11, 2017, after four seasons.

=== Chopped South Africa ===
Beginning July 23, 2014, Food Network South Africa began airing a local adaptation of Chopped called Chopped South Africa.

=== Chopped تحدي الطبخ ===
Beginning June 27, 2021, Dubai TV began airing a local adaptation of Chopped called Chopped تحدي الطبخ.

== See also ==
- Sweet Genius
- Cupcake Wars
- Chopped: Canada
- Chopped Junior
