= Chopped Junior =

American cooking television game show

- Genre: Cooking show
- Presented by: Ted Allen
- Country of origin: United States
- Original language: English
- No. of seasons: 7
- No. of episodes: 91

Original release
- Network: Food Network
- Release: October 27, 2015 – December 17, 2019

Chopped Junior is an American reality-based cooking television game show series hosted by Ted Allen that pits four adolescent chefs against each other, competing for a chance to win $10,000 and a Chopped Junior chef's coat. The show is a spin-off of Chopped. It aired on Food Network from October 27, 2015 to December 17, 2019.

== Episodes ==
Season	Episodes	Originally aired		Season Note
Season	Episodes	First aired	Last aired	Season Note
1	13	October 27, 2015	January 19, 2016	
2	13	April 26, 2016	July 19, 2016	
3	13	July 26, 2016	December 13, 2016	
4	13	August 9, 2016	January 17, 2017	
5	13	January 31, 2017	May 16, 2017	
6*	13	March 8, 2017	October 24, 2017	Includes 4 part "Make Me a Judge" special.
7*	13	May 30, 2017	September 19, 2017	Includes 5 part "Champions" special.
8	6	June 25, 2019	June 30, 2019	
9	6	November 12, 2019	December 17, 2019	
