= SousVide Supreme =

Sous-vide home appliance company

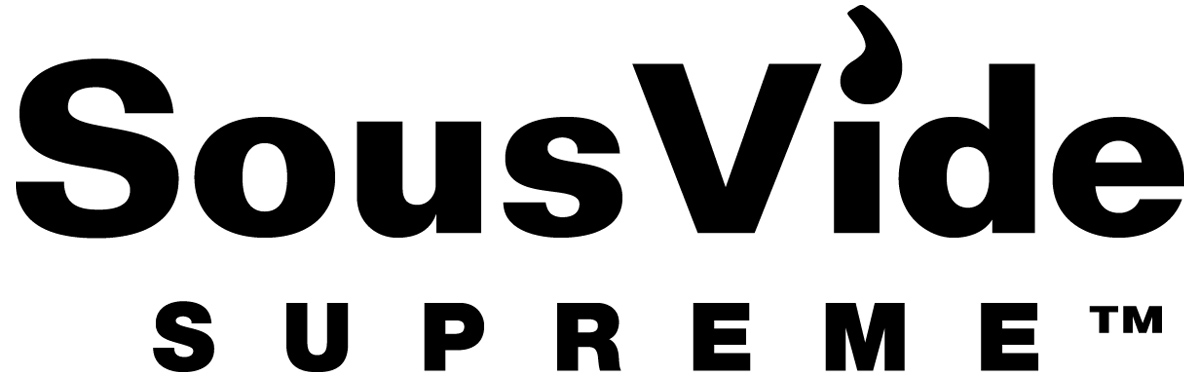
- Industry: Cookware / Kitchen Products
- Founded: November 2009
- Founder: Dr. Michael Eades and Dr. Mary Dan Eades
- Headquarters: Broomfield, Colorado, United States of America
- Products: www.sousvidesupreme.com

SousVide Supreme is a company producing sous-vide cooking devices for home cooking. It is best known for developing the SousVide Supreme water oven which allows home cooks access to cooking using a sous vide method, which previously requires expensive equipment.

== Company history ==
Eades Appliance Technology, LLC (EAT) was founded in 2009 by Dr. Michael and Mary Dan Eades along with their family. EAT is the parent company of SousVide Supreme and oversees all product developments and operations for the brand line of sous vide products.

The SousVide Supreme Water Oven, launched in November 2009, is the first PID controlled, self-contained sous-vide cooking device, designed specifically for home cooking. It delivers temperature precision within 1 °F or .5 °C. It was developed by Dr. Michael and Mary Dan Eades of Eades Appliance Technology, LLC.

In 2010 the company launched its product line in the UK and Europe and then more broadly. As of 2017 SousVide Supreme water ovens are sold in approximately 28 territories of different regions and countries across the globe.
