= World Food Championships =

- Status: Active
- Genre: Cooking competition
- Date: November
- Frequency: Annually
- Venue: The Wharf
- Location: Orange Beach, Alabama
- Country: United States
- Established: 2012

The World Food Championships (WFC) is an international cooking competition. It is the biggest of its kind and ran its 10th year of competition in 2022. It hosted its 9th annual event in Dallas, Texas at Fair Park from 05–9 November 2021. The competition puts chefs and home cooks on a level playing field, all competing for a piece of the $350,000 prize purse. After three rounds of challenges across 10 categories, 10 Category Champions are crowned and will later reconvene to battle it out at The Final Table for the World Food Champion title and $100,000 grand prize.

Produced by MMA Creative, an advertising agency located in Cookeville, Tennessee, the inaugural event was hosted in Las Vegas, Nevada in 2012. Since then, the championships has moved host cities periodically, working with city tourism departments to bring the larger-than-life culinary event to different cities such as Kissimmee, Florida, Orange Beach, Alabama and finally Dallas, Texas.

After several years as the marketing agency for the Kansas City Barbecue Society, Mike McCloud, President and CEO of WFC, began his journey to create a food competition that ranks the best chefs and home cooks in the world.

Yearly, more than 500 previously qualified teams travel from the United States and abroad to stake their claim at WFC. Earning their way to the competition by winning a Golden Ticket at a WFC sanctioned event, competitors are all trying to take home a piece of the $350,000 prize purse.

WFC has been filmed numerous times, starting with FYI as the World Food Championships TV series. Since then, it has been seen on the Discovery Networks' Destination America, ABC's Nightline, CBS Sunday Morning, Voice of America, Food Network and CNBC’s “The Final Table: New Orleans”.

With 2020 being cancelled due to the COVID-19 pandemic, the 9th competition was deferred to 2021.
