= BBQ Pitmasters =

American reality TV series

- Logo from its first season.
- Composer: Vanacore Music
- Country of origin: United States
- Original language: English
- No. of seasons: 7
- No. of episodes: 57

Production
- Running time: 46 minutes

Original release
- Network: TLC (2009–2010); Destination America (2012–2015)
- Release: December 3, 2009 – July 16, 2015

BBQ Pitmasters is an American reality television series which follows barbecue cooks as they compete for cash and prizes in barbecue cooking competitions.

The series premiered on TLC on December 3, 2009. The eight-episode first season was filmed in a docu-reality format, as it followed several competing BBQ teams around the country to various BBQ contests.

Season two premiered on August 12, 2010, at 10 pm EDT featuring a completely new competition game show-based format. Each week, four teams competed against each other. Challenges included common protein and more exotic meat. Weekly winners faced off against each other in the second-season finale as they vied for $100,000 and the Kingsford Cup. The judges for the second season were Myron Mixon, Art Smith, and Warren Sapp. Kevin Roberts served as host.

On January 29, 2012, Myron Mixon confirmed on his Facebook account for Jack's Old South that filming for Season 3 would start in March. On April 4, 2012, it was announced that Season 3 would air on Destination America, which is a rebranded version of the Planet Green channel that launched on May 26, 2012.

On May 26, 2014, Destination America debuted a preview of their new TV series named BBQ Pit Wars. The episode first aired on May 31, 2014. This new reality show uses the old docu-reality format of BBQ Pitmasters season 1 (many viewers had voiced their preference for this format on the channel's website), in which Myron Mixon is one of the team competitors rather than a BBQ judge. Along with Stump McDowell of Stump's BBQ, Moe Cason of Ponderosa BBQ, and Michael Character of Character BBQ, the four teams compete in regional BBQ championships around the nation, for prizes, and bragging rights to be named the master of BBQ.

== Series overview ==
Season	Episodes	Season premiere	Season finale
1	8	December 3, 2009	February 4, 2010
2	6	August 12, 2010	September 23, 2010
3	6	May 30, 2012	July 1, 2012
4	7	December 16, 2012	January 20, 2013
5	13	June 2, 2013	August 25, 2013
6	9	April 12, 2014	June 14, 2014
7	9	May 25, 2015	July 16, 2015

== Season 1 ==
No. overall			
1	1	"Smokin' in Mesquite"	December 3, 2009
The teams travel to Mesquite, Nevada to compete at the Smokin' in Mesquite BBQ competition, which has $40,000 in cash and prizes at stake.
2	2	"Murphysboro Barbecue Cook-off"	December 10, 2009
The teams compete at one of the most difficult competitions of the year, the Murphysboro Barbecue Cook-off, in Murphysboro, Illinois. Myron and Lee Ann face off in the whole hog competition, while tempers flare between Johnny and one of the local cooks.
3	3	"Decatur Jaycees Riverfest"	December 17, 2009
The teams travel to Decatur, Alabama to the historic Decatur Riverfest. This is where the pitmasters' cooking skills, nerves, and patience are tested and the $3,000 top prize is at stake.
4	4	"American Royal Invitational Barbecue"	January 7, 2010
The top teams are invited to compete at the American Royal Invitational in Kansas City, Missouri. Myron has to compete against his biggest competition on the barbecue competition circuit, Chris Lilly, and Rookie Paul begs for help from barbecue professional, Johnny Trigg.
5	5	"American Royal Open Barbecue"	January 11, 2010
Nearly 500 professional and amateur teams battle it out at the American Royal Open in Kansas City, Missouri for over $40,000 in prizes.
6	6	"Diamond State BBQ"	January 21, 2010
The teams travel to Dover, Delaware to compete at the Diamond State BBQ Championship, where the weather is less than ideal. Harry faces his former teammate, Gary, who is competing on his own for the first time, and Tuffy does Myron a favor that could hurt his own chances of winning.
7	7	"The Big Pig Jig"	January 28, 2010
The teams travel to Vienna, Georgia to compete at the Big Pig Jig, the oldest barbecue event in Georgia. Myron works to defend his title on his home turf and Tuffy takes on a double challenge, attempting his first whole hog on a new pit.
8	8	"Johnny Trigg's Shootout"	February 4, 2010
Johnny Trigg, the Godfather of Ribs, invites his closest friends and fiercest rivals to Mineral Wells, Texas for a rib throwdown and for the first time ever, the pitmasters watch the judges' reactions.

=== Season 1: Teams ===
- Jack's Old South, led by Myron Mixon
- Smokin' Triggers BBQ, led by Johnny Trigg
- Slap Yo' Daddy BBQ, led by Harry Soo
- Cool Smoke, led by Tuffy Stone
- Wood Chick's BBQ, owned by Lee Ann Whippen
- Jambo Pits, led by Jamie Geer
- Pablo Diablo's, led by Paul Petersen, a recognized Texas chef but BBQ rookie.
- Notley Que BBQ led by Gary Notley

== Season 2 ==
No. overall			
1	9	"Butt Out!"	August 12, 2010
Four top pitmasters from around the country compete head-to-head in a pork butt cook-off. However, one team is eliminated when their catfish is not up to par and the remaining three continue to vie to win $5,000 and an invitation to the season finale.
2	10	"Roasted Development"	August 19, 2010
Four top pitmasters from around the country compete head-to-head to prove who has the best crown roast pork in the hottest challenge yet. However, with one pitmaster headed into an ambulance, the remaining three vie to win $5,000 and an invitation to the season finale.
3	11	"Up In Smoke!"	August 26, 2010
Four top pitmasters from around the country compete head-to-head to prove who makes the best brisket. While the meat cooks low and slow, tempers flare as the teams vie to win $5,000 and an invitation to the season finale.
4	12	"Not a Moment To Spare"	September 2, 2010
Four BBQ Pitmasters face off with a BBQ favorite - spare ribs. But first, they face a prehistoric challenge that could extinct them from the competition and their chance at $5,000 and an invitation to the finale for the $100,000 grand prize.
5	13	"Fowl Play"	September 16, 2010
Four of America's top Pitmasters face off against the trifecta of fowl... a Turducken! There's $5000 at stake and an invitation into the finale for the largest prize in BBQ... $100,000 and the Kingsford Cup.
6	14	"Bring Home the Bacon"	September 23, 2010
The five BBQ Pitmaster winners from this season come together to face the most difficult of BBQ challenges: the whole hog on old-fashioned cinder block pits. Only one can win the Kingsford Cup, the $100,000 prize and be named BBQ Pitmaster Grand Champion.

=== Season 2: Judges ===
- Myron Mixon—season one competitor and owner of Jack's Old South
- Art Smith—celebrity chef and author of Back to the Table and Kitchen Life
- Warren Sapp—Super Bowl champion and barbecue enthusiast

=== Contestants ===
==== Season 2: Preliminary Results (Ep. 1-5) ====
Episode	Pitmaster	Team	Hometown	Episode Result
1	Moe Cason	Ponderosa BBQ	Des Moines, Iowa	1st Place $5000 & invite to finale
1	Ryan Amys	Hot Grill on Grill Action	Omaha, Nebraska	2nd Place
1	Nicole Davenport	Taint the Sauce	Sheffield, Texas	3rd Place
1	Harrison Sapp	Southern Soul BBQ	Saint Simons Island, Georgia	Eliminated
2	Melissa Cookston	Yazoo's Delta Q	Nesbit, Mississippi	1st Place $5000 & invite to finale
2	John Fernandez-Melone	Bare Bones BBQ	Pleasanton, California	2nd Place
2	Rhoda Brown	Smokin' Fatties	West Monroe, Louisiana	3rd Place
2	Brent Walton	QN4U	Clovis, California	Eliminated
3	Craig Kimmel	Firehouse BBQ	DeLand, Florida	1st Place $5000 & invite to finale
3	Bubba Latimer	Bub-Ba-Q	Jasper, Georgia	2nd Place
3	Joe Davidson	Joe BBQ	Bixby, Oklahoma	3rd Place
3	Kyle Laval/Stephanie Wilson	The Slabs	Kansas City, Missouri	Eliminated
4	Johnny Trigg	Smokin' Triggers	Alvarado, Texas	1st Place $5000 & invite to finale
4	Danielle Dimovski	Diva Q	Barrie, Ontario	2nd Place
4	Jody Clark	Big Poppa Smokers	Coachella, California	3rd Place
4	Neil Strawder	Bigmistas	Long Beach, California	4th place (no elimination in this episode)
5	Shad Kirton	A Boy & His BBQ	Grimes, Iowa	1st Place $5000 & invite to finale
5	Dan Hixon	3 Eyz BBQ	Owings Mills, Maryland	2nd Place
5	Lee Ann Whippen	Wood Chicks BBQ	Chesapeake, Virginia	3rd Place
5	Tyler Sayler	Big Mouth Smokers	Memphis, Tennessee	Eliminated

==== Season 2: Final Results (Ep. 6) ====
Episode	Pitmaster	Team	Hometown	Episode Result
6	Shad Kirton	A Boy & His BBQ	Grimes, Iowa	1st Place
6	Melissa Cookston	Yazoo's Delta Q	Nesbit, Mississippi	2nd Place
6	Johnny Trigg	Smokin' Triggers	Alvarado, Texas	3rd Place
6	Moe Cason	Ponderosa BBQ	Des Moines, Iowa	Eliminated
6	Craig Kimmel	Firehouse BBQ	DeLand, Florida	Eliminated

== Season 3 ==
In this season, three teams compete in each episode. The winning team will move on to the championship round, where they will compete for a $50,000 prize.

No. overall			
1	15	"Try, Try, Tri-Tip Again"	May 30, 2012
Three Pitmasters compete at the Don't Be Cruel BBQ to see who has the best beef brisket and tri-tip
2	16	"Baby Light My Fire"	June 3, 2012
Three Pitmasters compete at the annual Pigs in Flight BBQ Competition.
3	17	"Trimming the Fat"	June 10, 2012
4	18	"All Hammered Up!"	June 17, 2012
5	19	"Doctors, Divas, and 2 Worthless Nuts"	June 24, 2012
6	20	"The Grand Porkin' Finale"	July 1, 2012

=== Season 3: Judges ===
- Myron Mixon
- Tuffy Stone
- Aaron Franklin, the owner and pitmaster of Franklin Barbecue

=== Contestants ===
==== Season 3: Preliminary Results (Ep. 1-5) ====
Episode	Pitmaster	Team	Hometown	Episode Result
1 Wagyu Brisket & Tri-Tip; Tupelo, MS	Solomon Williams	Carolina Rib King	Georgetown, South Carolina	1st Place
1 Wagyu Brisket & Tri-Tip; Tupelo, MS	Hank Vaiden	Cotton Patch Cooking Crew	Columbus, Mississippi	2nd Place
1 Wagyu Brisket & Tri-Tip; Tupelo, MS	Jim Stancil	Bare Knuckles BBQ	Oxford, Georgia	3rd Place
2 Pork Shoulder & Baby Back Ribs; Memphis, TN	Melissa Cookston	Memphis Barbecue Co.	Nesbit, Mississippi	1st Place
2 Pork Shoulder & Baby Back Ribs; Memphis, TN	Moe Cason	Ponderosa Barbecue	Des Moines, Iowa	2nd Place
2 Pork Shoulder & Baby Back Ribs; Memphis, TN	Donny Bray	Warren County Pork Choppers	Bowling Green, Kentucky	3rd Place
3 Pork Belly and Turkey; Thomaston, GA	Johnny Trigg	Smokin' Triggers	Alvarado, Texas	1st Place
3 Pork Belly and Turkey; Thomaston, GA	Chris Hart	Wicked Good BBQ	Boston, Massachusetts	2nd Place
3 Pork Belly and Turkey; Thomaston, GA	Charles Wilson	C-Dub's Corruption BBQ	Puyallup, Washington	3rd Place
4 Beef Ribs & Fresh Ham; Dothan, AL	Corey Brinson	Fatback's BBQ & Rib Shack	Fayetteville, North Carolina	1st Place
4 Beef Ribs & Fresh Ham; Dothan, AL	Lee Ann Whippen	Wood Chicks BBQ	Chesapeake, Virginia	2nd Place
4 Beef Ribs & Fresh Ham; Dothan, AL	Shane McBride	Ribdiculous Bar-B-Krewe	New York City, New York	3rd Place
5 Chicken & Rack of Pork; Salisbury, MD	Danielle Dimovski	Diva Q BBQ	Ontario, Canada	1st Place
5 Chicken & Rack of Pork; Salisbury, MD	Rob Marion	2 Worthless Nuts	Cleveland, Ohio	2nd Place
5 Chicken & Rack of Pork; Salisbury, MD	Randy Hill	Southern Krunk Burn One Boys BBQ	Little Rock, Arkansas	3rd Place

==== Season 3: Final Results (Ep. 6) ====
Episode	Pitmaster	Team	Hometown	Episode Result
6 Pork Shoulder, Spare Rib and Cheek	Johnny Trigg	Smokin' Triggers	Alvarado, Texas	1st Place
6 Pork Shoulder, Spare Rib and Cheek	Corey Brinson	Fatback's BBQ & Rib Shack	Fayetteville, North Carolina	2nd Place
6 Pork Shoulder, Spare Rib and Cheek	Danielle Dimovski	Diva Q BBQ	Ontario, Canada	3rd Place
6 Pork Shoulder, Spare Rib and Cheek	Solomon Williams	Carolina Rib King	Georgetown, South Carolina	Eliminated
6 Pork Shoulder, Spare Rib and Cheek	Melissa Cookston	Memphis Barbecue Co.	Nesbit, Mississippi	Eliminated

== Season 4 ==
This season features individual regional BBQ style competitions. Each episode crowned a regional champion of the BBQ style for that state. Three local teams compete for bragging rights, and a $2,000 prize donated by Jack's Old South. There is no overall BBQ champion at the end of season 4. The last episode has Myron Mixon competing against his son Michael.

No. overall			
1	21	"Deep in the Heart of BBQ"	December 16, 2012
2	22	"Peach State Country Picnic"	December 23, 2012
3	23	"True Blue Memphis Style Que"	December 30, 2012
4	24	"Royal Ribs & Burnt Ends"	January 6, 2013
5	25	"Carolina's Divine Swine Cook Off"	January 13, 2013
6	26	"Bluegrass, Bourbon & BBQ"	January 20, 2013
7	27	"Father vs. Son"	January 25, 2013

=== Season 4: Judges ===
- Myron Mixon
- Tuffy Stone
- (Aaron Franklin)

=== Contestants ===
==== Season 4: Episode Results ====
Episode	Pitmaster	Team	Hometown	Episode Result
1 Beef Brisket & Cowboy Steak; Bedford, TX	Harold "Buzzie" Hughes	Buzzie's BBQ Restaurant	Kerrville, Texas	1st Place
1 Beef Brisket & Cowboy Steak; Bedford, TX	Ernest Servantes	Burnt Bean Company	New Braunfels, Texas	2nd Place
1 Beef Brisket & Cowboy Steak; Bedford, TX	Will Fleischman	Lockhart Smokehouse	Dallas, Texas	3rd Place
2 Pork Picnic & Country-Style Ribs; Atlanta, GA	Dionn Lanton	Holy Smokes BBQ	Dublin, Georgia	1st Place
2 Pork Picnic & Country-Style Ribs; Atlanta, GA	Danny Outlaw	Georgia Bob's BBQ Co.	Warner Robins, GA	2nd Place
2 Pork Picnic & Country-Style Ribs; Atlanta, GA	Bear Sloane	Lazy Bear BBQ	Gainesville, GA	3rd Place
3 Pulled Chicken, Wet & Dry Baby Back Ribs; Memphis, TN	Mark West	10 Bones BBQ	Memphis, TN	1st Place
3 Pulled Chicken, Wet & Dry Baby Back Ribs; Memphis, TN	Craig Blondis	Central BBQ	Memphis, TN	2nd Place
3 Pulled Chicken, Wet & Dry Baby Back Ribs; Memphis, TN	Carey Bringle	Peg Leg Porker	Nashville, TN	3rd Place
4 Pork Spareribs & Brisket Points; Kansas City, MO	Rod Gray	Pellet Envy	Leawood, Kansas	1st Place
4 Pork Spareribs & Brisket Points; Kansas City, MO	Tim Grant	TrueBud BBQ	Tonganoxie, Kansas	2nd Place
4 Pork Spareribs & Brisket Points; Kansas City, MO	Stretch	Grinders BBQ	Kansas City, Missouri	3rd Place
5 Pork Belly & Whole Pork Shoulder; Charlotte, NC	Zach Goodyear	Sauceman's BBQ	Charlotte, NC	1st Place
5 Pork Belly & Whole Pork Shoulder; Charlotte, NC	Sam Jones	Skylight Inn BBQ	Ayden, NC	2nd Place
5 Pork Belly & Whole Pork Shoulder; Charlotte, NC	Debbie Holt	Clyde Copper's BBQ	Raleigh, North Carolina	3rd Place
6 Mutton & Country Ham; Munfordville, KY	John Foreman	Old Hickory Bar-B-Q	Owensboro, Kentucky	1st Place
6 Mutton & Country Ham; Munfordville, KY	Mike Ramage	Still Smokin' BBQ	Louisville, Kentucky	2nd Place
6 Mutton & Country Ham; Munfordville, KY	Roy Henry	Henry's Boogalou BBQ	Owensboro, Kentucky	3rd Place
7 The Big Pig Jig; Vienna, GA	Myron Mixon	Jack's Old South	Unadilla, Georgia	1st Place
7 The Big Pig Jig; Vienna, GA	Michael Mixon	Jack's New South	Unadilla, Georgia	Not a finalist

== Season 5 ==
This season the BBQ competition returns to the previous elimination format. Three teams from around the country compete in each episode, and the winning teams advance to the finale. The overall grand BBQ champion wins a $50,000 prize.

No. overall			
1	28	"When Pigs Fly"	June 2, 2013
Season 5 begins with a trip to Pensacola, Fla., for the Smokin' in the Square festival and a barbecue cook-off featuring spareribs and pork butt.
2	29	"Por-ken for Dinner"	June 16, 2013
The competition takes place at the 12th annual Hog Wild Festival in Mobile, Ala., where three chefs cook whole chicken and whole pork shoulder.
3	30	"Everything is Beefier in Texas"	June 2, 2013
Beef ribs and shoulder are prepared by three chefs when the competition travels to Austin.
4	31	"BBQ Border Battle"	June 23, 2013
Non-Southerners compete.
5	32	"Race to the Finish"	June 30, 2013
Three couples compete at Martinsville Speedway in Virginia, and the winning pair get to join Dale Earnhardt Jr. in pit row.
6	33	"Kicking it in KC"	July 7, 2013
The 10th annual Smoke in the Spring BBQ Contest in Osage City, Kan., is featured.
7	34	"A NY State of Cue"	July 14, 2013
The 2nd Annual NYC BBQ Cookoff in Staten Island is featured.
8	35	"Champions Q-Off"	July 21, 2013
Previous champions return for an all-star showdown at the Barnesville BBQ and Blues Festival in Georgia.
9	36	"O-Cue-Homa"	July 28, 2013
The competition travels to Oklahoma for the Bixby BBQ and Blues Festival.
10	37	"Virginia is for BBQ Lovers"	August 4, 2013
The semifinals begin in Fredericksburg, Va., with returning champions David Bouska, Michael Character and Mark "Pig Daddy" Little competing.
11	38	"My Kind of Q!"	August 11, 2013
The second round of the semifinals takes place in Westmont, Ill., and features Lynnae Oxley, Jeff Vanderlinde and Rob "Rub" Bagby competing.
12	39	"Show Me the Q"	August 18, 2013
The last semifinal round features Stump McDowell, Robby Royal and Rod Gray.
13	40	"BBQ Dreams Come True"	August 25, 2013
David Bouska, Rod Gray, and Lynnae Oxley compete to be grand champion.

=== Season 5: Judges ===
- Myron Mixon
- Tuffy Stone
- (3rd Judge changes in each episode)

=== Contestants ===
==== Season 5: Episode Results ====
Episode	Pitmaster	Team	Hometown	Episode Result
1 Pork Butt & Spareribs	David Bouska	Butcher BBQ	Chandler, Oklahoma	1st Place
1 Pork Butt & Spareribs	Eric Thomas	The Rolling Grill	Atlanta, Georgia	2nd Place
1 Pork Butt & Spareribs	Big Jim Modesitt	Big Jim's BBQ	San Francisco, California	3rd Place
2 Whole Pork Shoulder & Whole Chicken	Mark "Pig Daddy" Little	Team Bibs	Winston-Salem, North Carolina	1st Place
2 Whole Pork Shoulder & Whole Chicken	Sara Horowitz	Nacho Mama	El Paso, Texas	2nd Place
2 Whole Pork Shoulder & Whole Chicken	Chuck Baker	Barrel House BBQ	Lynchburg, Tennessee	3rd Place
3 Beef Shoulder Clod & Beef Ribs	Michael Character	Character's Famous BBQ	Adairsville, Georgia	1st Place
3 Beef Shoulder Clod & Beef Ribs	Glenn Gross	Fat Jack's BBQ	Philadelphia, Pennsylvania	2nd Place
3 Beef Shoulder Clod & Beef Ribs	Garry Roark	Ubons BBQ of Yazoo	Yazoo, Mississippi	3rd Place
4 Buffalo Brisket & Bone in Pork Loin	Jeff Vanderlinde	Shiggin' & Grinnin'	Delano, Minnesota	1st Place
4 Buffalo Brisket & Bone in Pork Loin	Andy King	The Bastey Boys	Templeton, Massachusetts	2nd Place
4 Buffalo Brisket & Bone in Pork Loin	Scott Lane	Piggy's UK	Hugglescote, Leicestershire, UK	3rd Place
5 Turkey & Baby Back Ribs	Rob "Rub" Bagby	Swamp Boys	Winter Haven, Florida	1st Place
5 Turkey & Baby Back Ribs	Tommy Houston	Checkered Pig	Martinsville, Virginia	2nd Place
5 Turkey & Baby Back Ribs	Jennifer Duncan	Smoked to the Bone	Gilbert, Arizona	3rd Place
6 Brisket Points & Turkey Legs	Lynnae Oxley	Sugar's BBQ	Portland, Oregon	1st Place
6 Brisket Points & Turkey Legs	Danny Coogle	Pit Bulls Up in Smoke	Kennesaw, Georgia	2nd Place
6 Brisket Points & Turkey Legs	Cody Archie	Lulu's BBQ	East Prairie, Missouri	3rd Place
7 Pork Belly & BBQ Chicken Wings	Stump McDowell	Stump's BBQ Team	Elko, Georgia	1st Place
7 Pork Belly & BBQ Chicken Wings	Jamie Geer	Jambo Pits Cooking Team	Burleson, Texas	2nd Place
7 Pork Belly & BBQ Chicken Wings	Rich Tuttle	K Cass Bar-B-Que	Kansas City, Missouri	3rd Place
8 Pork Spare Ribs & Brisket Flat	Rod Gray	Pellet Envy	Kansas City, Kansas	1st Place
8 Pork Spare Ribs & Brisket Flat	Corey Brinson	Fatback's BBQ & Rib Shack	Fayetteville, North Carolina	2nd Place
8 Pork Spare Ribs & Brisket Flat	Mark West	10 Bones BBQ	Hernando, Mississippi	3rd Place
9 Country-Style Ribs & Beef Tri-Tip	Robby Royal	Rescue Smokers	Sycamore, Georgia	1st Place
9 Country-Style Ribs & Beef Tri-Tip	Jack Waiboer	Common Interest BBQ	Charleston, South Carolina	2nd Place
9 Country-Style Ribs & Beef Tri-Tip	Howie Kleinberg	Bulldog BBQ	Miami, Florida	3rd Place
10; Fresh Ham & Buffalo Short Ribs	David Bouska	Butcher BBQ	Chandler, Oklahoma	1st Place
10; Fresh Ham & Buffalo Short Ribs	Michael Character	Character's Famous BBQ	Adairsville, Georgia	2nd Place
10; Fresh Ham & Buffalo Short Ribs	Mark "Pig Daddy" Little	Team Bibs	Winston-Salem, North Carolina	3rd Place
11; Whole Pork Shoulder & BBQ Meatloaf (Pork, Veal, and Beef Chunks)	Lynnae Oxley	Sugar's BBQ	Portland, Oregon	1st Place
11; Whole Pork Shoulder & BBQ Meatloaf (Pork, Veal, and Beef Chunks)	Rob "Rub" Bagby	Swamp Boys	Winter Haven, Florida	2nd Place
11; Whole Pork Shoulder & BBQ Meatloaf (Pork, Veal, and Beef Chunks)	Jeff Vanderlinde	Shiggin' and Grinnin'	Delano, Minnesota	3rd Place
12; Brisket Point & Venison Tenderloin	Rod Gray	Pellet Envy	Kansas City, Kansas	1st Place
12; Brisket Point & Venison Tenderloin	Robby Royal	Rescue Smokers	Sycamore, Georgia	2nd Place
12; Brisket Point & Venison Tenderloin	Stump McDowell	Stump's BBQ Team	Elko, Georgia	3rd Place
13; Whole Hog; Finale	Rod Gray	Pellet Envy	Leawood, Kansas	1st Place
13; Whole Hog; Finale	Lynnae Oxley	Sugar's BBQ	Portland, Oregon	2nd Place
13; Whole Hog; Finale	David Bouska	Butcher BBQ	Chandler, Oklahoma	3rd Place

== Season 6 ==
All Season 6 episodes were filmed in a single location in Florida.

No. overall			
1	41	"Sweet Georgia Ham"	April 12, 2014
BBQ Pitmasters veterans Robby Royal and Eric Thomas face off against newcomer John Ley in this Georgia style contest to see who will move on to win a shot at becoming BBQ Pitmaster Grand Champion.
2	42	"Lone Star Smoke War"	April 19, 2014
Texas pitmasters JD Davidsmeyer, Matt Pittman, and Junior Urias battle it out for the title of BBQ Pitmasters Texas Champion and a chance to compete for the $50,000 grand prize.
3	43	"Kansas City Que-Off"	April 26, 2014
Kansas City locals Michael Johnson, Richard Fergola, and Joe Pearce step in the ring of BBQ Pitmasters for the title of BBQ Pitmasters Kansas City Champion and a shot at the $50,000 grand prize.
4	44	"Smoking in Memphis"	May 3, 2014
Tennessee cookers Ken Wood, Michael McDearman and Chris Chadwick summon that Memphis soul and go toe to toe to see who will win BBQ Pitmasters Memphis Championship and the chance to win the $50,000 grand prize.
5	45	"Kings of Carolina"	May 10, 2014
North Carolina cookers Jonathan Upchurch, Christopher Prieto and Carl Lewis must fan their flames and get things cooking to get a shot at competing for $50,000 and the title of BBQ Pitmasters Grand Champion.
6	46	"Made in the USA"	May 17, 2014
Among Louisianan Jeff Petkevicius, New Yorker Howard Daley and Alabamian Jeff Coon, which wild card competitor will emerge victorious and keep their barbecue dream alive?
7	47	"Ribs, Ribs, and More Ribs"	May 31, 2014
Among Georgia Champion Robby Royal of Rescue Smokers, Texas Champion Junior Urias of Up in Smoke and Wild Card Champion John Coon of House of Q, who will emerge victorious to continue on to win the title of BBQ Pitmasters Grand Champion?
8	48	"Best in Beef"	June 7, 2014
Regional Champions Joe Pearce, Ken Wood and Carl Lewis are grilling to stay alive in this thrilling BBQ Pitmasters Semi Final round. They all know that only one will survive and have a chance to be crowned Kingsford BBQ Pitmasters Grand Champion.
9	49	"Winner Takes All"	June 14, 2014
Semi Final Champions Robby Royal of Rescue Smokers and Joe Pearce of Squeal Like A Pig BBQ go head to head in the Finale to decide once and for all who is the Kingsford BBQ Pitmasters Grand Champion and winner of the $50,000 grand prize.

=== Season 6: Judges ===
- Myron Mixon
- Tuffy Stone
- Moe Cason

=== Contestants ===
==== Season 6: Preliminary Results (Ep. 1-6) ====
Episode	Pitmaster	Team	Hometown	Episode Result
1 Bone-In Ham & Smoked Salmon	Robby Royal	Rescue Smokers	Sycamore, Georgia	1st Place; Invite to semi-final 1
1 Bone-In Ham & Smoked Salmon	John A. Ley Jr.	Heavenly Hawgs	Perry, Georgia	2nd Place
1 Bone-In Ham & Smoked Salmon	Eric Thomas	The Rolling Grill	Atlanta, Georgia	3rd Place
2 Vegas Strip Steak & Brisket Flat
2 Vegas Strip Steak & Brisket Flat	Junior Urias	Up in Smoke BBQ	Midland, Texas	1st Place; Invite to semi-final 1
2 Vegas Strip Steak & Brisket Flat	JD Davidsmeyer	JD's Team Xtreme BBQ	San Antonio, Texas	2nd Place
2 Vegas Strip Steak & Brisket Flat	Matt Pittman	Meat Church	Waxahachie, Texas	3rd Place
3 Smoked Beef Prime Rib & Whole Chicken
3 Smoked Beef Prime Rib & Whole Chicken	Joe Pearce	Squeal Like A Pig BBQ	Kansas City, Missouri	1st Place; Invite to semi-final 2
3 Smoked Beef Prime Rib & Whole Chicken	Michael Johnson	Sugarfire Smokehouse	St. Louis, Missouri	2nd Place
3 Smoked Beef Prime Rib & Whole Chicken	Richard Fergola	Fergolicious BBQ	Gardner, Kansas	3rd Place
4 Pork Spareribs & Pork Butts
4 Pork Spareribs & Pork Butts	Ken Wood	Charcoal Cowboys	Franklin, Tennessee	1st Place; Invite to semi-final 2
4 Pork Spareribs & Pork Butts	Michael McDearman	Fired Up BBQ	Cookeville, Tennessee	2nd Place
4 Pork Spareribs & Pork Butts	Chris Chadwick	Hawg County Cookers	McKenzie, Tennessee	3rd Place
5 Baby Back Ribs & Pork Shoulder
5 Baby Back Ribs & Pork Shoulder	Carl H. Lewis	Big Show BBQ	Fremont, North Carolina	1st Place; Invite to semi-final 2
5 Baby Back Ribs & Pork Shoulder	Jonathan Upchurch	Rocky Top BBQ	Monroe, North Carolina	2nd Place
5 Baby Back Ribs & Pork Shoulder	Christopher Prieto	Prime BBQ	Wendell, North Carolina	3rd Place
6 Whole Turkey & Rack of Lamb
6 Whole Turkey & Rack of Lamb	John Coon	House of Q	Springville, Alabama	1st Place; Invite to semi-final 1
6 Whole Turkey & Rack of Lamb	Jeff Petkevicius	Give it to God BBQ	Ponchatoula, Louisiana	2nd Place
6 Whole Turkey & Rack of Lamb	Howard Daley	DTS BBQ	New York City, New York	3rd Place

==== Season 6: Semi-Final Results (Ep. 7-8) ====
Episode	Pitmaster	Team	Hometown	Episode Result
7 Baby Back Ribs, Beef Ribs, Country Style Ribs
7 Baby Back Ribs, Beef Ribs, Country Style Ribs	Robby Royal	Rescue Fire Smokers	Sycamore, Georgia	1st Place; Advances to Final
7 Baby Back Ribs, Beef Ribs, Country Style Ribs	John Coon	House of Q	Springville, Alabama	2nd Place
7 Baby Back Ribs, Beef Ribs, Country Style Ribs	Junior Urias	Up In Smoke BBQ	Midland, Texas	3rd Place
8 Brisket Point, Cowboy Steaks, Beef Tenderloin
8 Brisket Point, Cowboy Steaks, Beef Tenderloin	Joe Pearce	Squeal Like A Pig BBQ	Kansas City, Missouri	1st Place; Advances to Final
8 Brisket Point, Cowboy Steaks, Beef Tenderloin	Carl H. Lewis	Big Show BBQ	Fremont, North Carolina	2nd Place
8 Brisket Point, Cowboy Steaks, Beef Tenderloin	Ken Wood	Charcoal Cowboys	Franklin, Tennessee	3rd Place

===== Season 6: Final Results (Episode 9) =====
Episode	Pitmaster	Team	Hometown	Episode Result
9 Brisket Flat, Spare Ribs, Whole Chicken, Whole Pork Shoulder; One Bite Challenge: Shrimp
9 Brisket Flat, Spare Ribs, Whole Chicken, Whole Pork Shoulder; One Bite Challenge: Shrimp	Robby Royal	Rescue Fire Smokers	Sycamore, Georgia	1st Place
9 Brisket Flat, Spare Ribs, Whole Chicken, Whole Pork Shoulder; One Bite Challenge: Shrimp	Joe Pearce	Squeal Like A Pig BBQ	Kansas City, Missouri	2nd Place
