= Tuffy Stone =

American chef

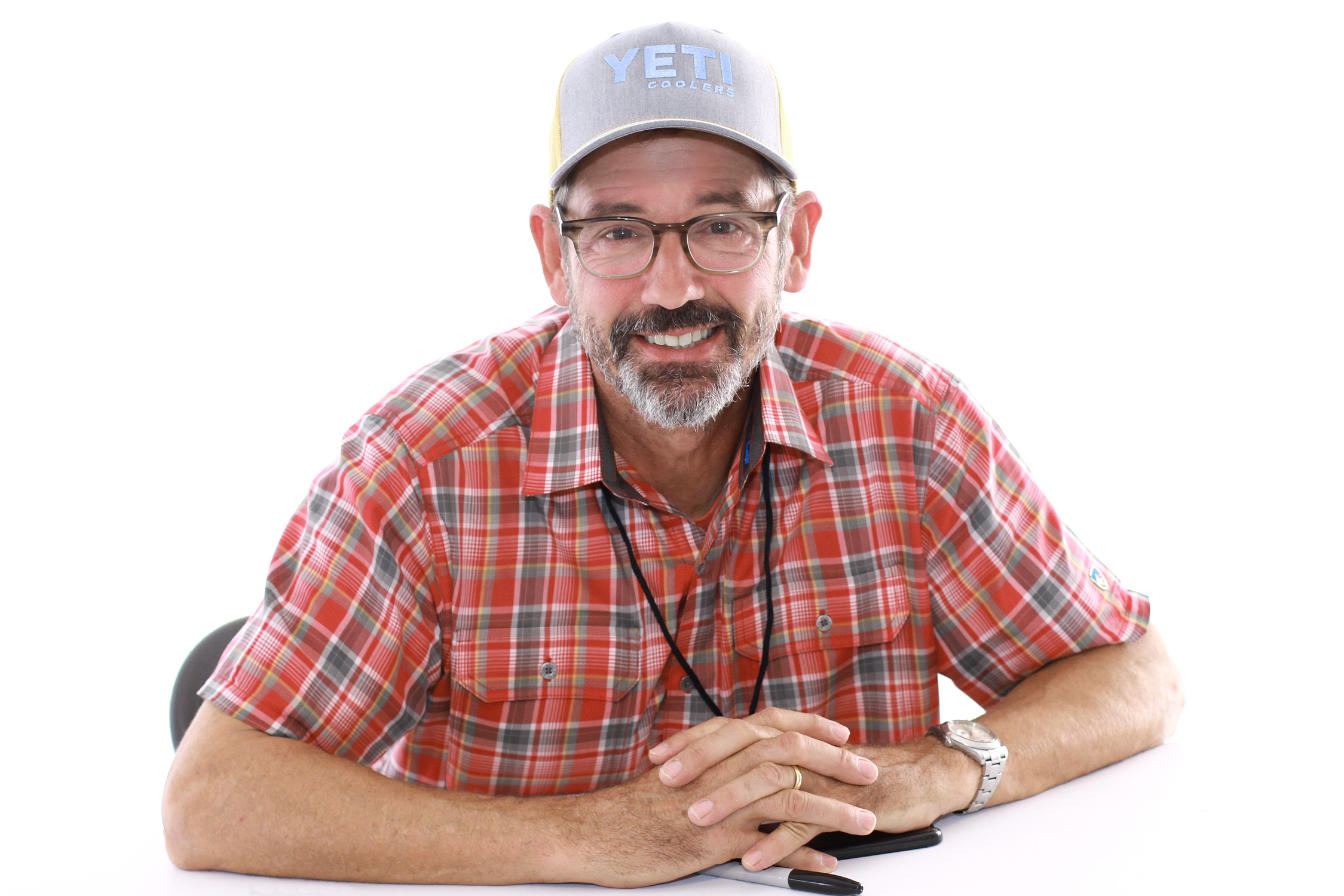
- Stone at the 2018 Texas Book Festival
- Born: George Stone; 1962 or 1963 (age 61–62)
- Spouse: Leslie Stone
- Culinary career
- Cooking style: Barbecue
- Television show(s): BBQ Pitmasters
- Award(s) won: Multi-time Grand Champion
- Website: www.tuffystone.com

George "Tuffy" Stone (born 1962/1963) is an American chef and competitor on the competitive barbecue circuit. He has appeared on the Destination America reality television show BBQ Pitmasters. He runs the team "Cool Smoke". His nickname is "The Professor".

== Early life ==
Stone was born in 1962 or 1963 and named George after his father. His mother nicknamed him "Tuffy" at the age of two. He attended an all boys prep school and afterwards considered attending East Carolina University on a running scholarship, but instead joined the United States Marine Corps for four years. He worked primarily in aviation engineering on McDonnell Douglas F/A-18 Hornets. After leaving the Marines, he attended Virginia Commonwealth University.

== Culinary career ==
Stone began his culinary career while working under Alain Vincey in 1987 at Vincey's restaurant La Maisonette in Richmond, Virginia. He left the restaurant in 1991, and in November 1993 he started his own catering company alongside his wife, called "A Sharper Palate". He founded his barbecue team "Cool Smoke" in 2004, and cooks alongside his father George. He describes himself as a traditional wood burner, and tends to use hickory wood in his smoking. Stone and his team compete on the competitive barbecue circuit. He owns a Virginian-based local chain barbecue restaurant called "Q Barbeque".

He was the Grand Champion of the 2006 Albertsville competition, which was organized by the Kansas City Barbecue Society. In 2010, he was named Grand Champion of the Maryland State BBQ Championship. The same year, he appeared on TLC's BBQ Pitmasters. He became a judge on the show in season three, when the show was moved to the Destination America cable channel. He joined Myron Mixon who returned from judging on season two, having previously appeared with Stone in season one, with the pair being joined by Aaron Franklin. Stone served as a judge at the Kingsford Invitational where the winners of eight major barbecue competitions were invited to compete for a grand prize of $50,000. The event was won by Johnny Trigg. Tuffy's team Cool Smoke won the 2013 Jack Daniel's Invitational BBQ competition in Lynchburg, TN on October 26, 2013. Cool Smoke won the 35th Annual American Royal World Series of Barbecue Open on October 5, 2014. Tuffy's team Cool Smoke won the 2015 Jack Daniel's Invitational BBQ competition in Lynchburg, TN for the second time on October 24, 2015, and became the first team to repeat as Grand Champion at the event the following year in October 2016.

Stone competed on a team in BBQ Brawl: Flay v. Symon, a Food Network show premiering August 1, 2019.

== Personal life ==
Stone and his wife Leslie have a son named Sam. Tuffy and Leslie met when they both worked at the Strawberry Street Cafe in Richmond, Virginia. He is nicknamed "The Professor".
