= Myron Mixon =

American celebrity chef

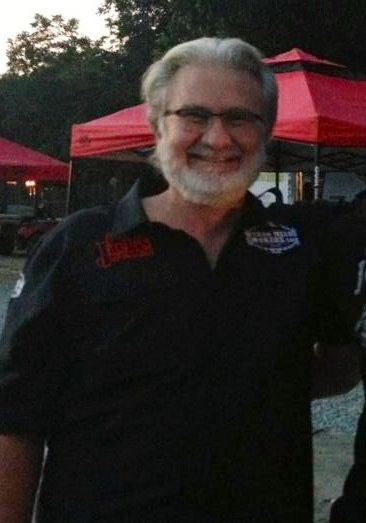
- Mixon during a BBQ course in 2013
- Born: May 30, 1962 (age 64); Vienna, Georgia, U.S.
- Spouse: Faye Mixon
- Culinary career
- Cooking style: Barbecue
- Television show
- BBQ Pitmasters
- Awardss
- 5x World Championships; 220+ Grand Championships
- Website: jacksoldsouth.com

Myron Mixon (born May 31, 1962) is an American celebrity chef, restaurateur, competitor on the barbecue circuit, and five-time barbecue World Champion. His achievements throughout his BBQ career have earned him the nickname "the winningest man in barbecue."

Mixon was a judge on Smoked and BBQ Pitmasters, two Destination America reality television shows, and also appeared in four episodes of BBQ Pit Wars.

== Career ==
Mixon's father, Jack Mixon, taught him how to make barbecue, and he originally took up competitive BBQ to promote the BBQ sauce that Jack and Myron's mother, Gaye Mixon, created. Mixon later named his BBQ company, Jack's Old South, after his father.

At his first barbecue competition in Atlanta, Georgia in 1996, Mixon won first place in the whole hog category and third place in the pork shoulder category.

Over the course of his competitive career, Mixon has won over 180 BBQ grand championships and 1,700 BBQ trophies. He has been named Grand Champion at the Memphis in May World Championship on five occasions: in 2001, 2004, 2007, 2016, and 2021.

Mixon has been the Big Pig Jig Grand Champion multiple times, most recently in 2012 when he had his third victory in a row.

Mixon has not won the Jack Daniel's BBQ World Invitational, which he described as the most prestigious competition on the BBQ circuit. He was runner up in 2004, missing first place by 0.1 points, and he has placed first in the whole hog category on three occasions.

Mixon was a contestant on BBQ Pitmasters in its inaugural season as a TLC reality television show. Originally, the show followed various BBQ chefs as they competed in BBQ competitions. In its second season the show's format changed to a competition, with Mixon, Art Smith, and Warren Sapp serving as the three judges. In its third season the show moved to the Destination America cable TV channel and had another slight change. Mixon continued as a judge, and fellow BBQ chefs Aaron Franklin and Tuffy Stone joined him.

In 2010 Mixon signed a cookbook deal with Ballantine Books. Paula Deen provided the foreword, and the cookbook was published in 2011.

In May 2012 Mixon appeared on NBC's The Today Show in a BBQ cookoff against Pat Martin of Tennessee restaurant Martin's Bar-B-Que. Mixon made brisket, and Martin made "red neck tacos."

Mixon was elected mayor of his hometown of Unadilla, Georgia, and was sworn in for a four-year term in January 2016.

== Published works ==
- Smokin' with Myron Mixon – Myron Mixon, Alexander, Kelly (May 10, 2011) 192 pages New York: Ballantine Books. ISBN 9780345528537
- Everyday Barbecue: At Home with America's Favorite Pitmaster – Myron Mixon, Alexander, Kelly (May 7, 2013) 320 pages.
- Myron Mixon's BBQ Rules – Myron Mixon, Alexander, Kelly (April 19, 2016) 240 pages.

== Restaurants ==
In January 2017 Mixon and business partners Joe Corey, a certified BBQ judge, and Bill McFadden opened Myron Mixon’s Pitmaster BBQ (now permanently closed) in Alexandria, Virginia. The restaurant featured some of Mixon’s favorite recipes, including Jack's Peach BBQ Baked Beans, Baby Back Mac and Cheese, and Dry Rubbed Wings. John Bennett was the head pitmaster.

Mixon partnered with Kennedy Concepts to open Myron Mixon BBQ in Gatlinburg, Tennessee, on May 28, 2025.
