= Chef (soundtrack) =

2014 soundtrack album by Various artists

Chef (Original Motion Picture Soundtrack)

Soundtrack album by Various artists
- Released: May 6, 2014
- Genre: Latin jazz; Afro-Cuban jazz; New Orleans jazz; salsa; country music; blues; soul; funk
- Length: 73:24
- Label: Milan

Chef (Original Motion Picture Soundtrack) is the soundtrack to the 2014 film of the same name directed by Jon Favreau released on May 6, 2014, by Milan Records. The album featured selections of music chose by music supervisor Mathieu Schreyer — a combination of Latin jazz, New Orleans jazz, Afro-Cuban jazz, salsa, soul, funk and blues, which serve as background to the storyline as it moves through Miami, New Orleans and Austin, respectively. It also featured additional incidental music was scored by Lyle Workman.

== Reception ==
The album received generally positive response from critics. Ryan Leas in his review for Stereogum called it as "one of the best soundtrack moments of the month", praising the music for Chef and wrote "Most of the music, accordingly, is a great time — lively Afro-Cuban rhythms and giddy brass bands and Gary Clark, Jr.’s blues licks serve as markers for the food truck’s three stops of Miami, New Orleans, and Austin, lining up nicely with how each city’s cuisine is represented specifically. Collectively, the whole movie has an air of celebration about it for America’s various inherited sounds and tastes." In his review for The New York Times, Stephen Holden called it as "a terrific soundtrack that mixes salsa, soul music and country blues with Caribbean styles".

Joe Leydon of Variety wrote "the eclectic mix of musical selections chosen by music supervisor Mathieu Schreyer could encourage many ticket buyers to rush home and download the entire soundtrack — but not before they first satiate their stoked appetites." Zeba Blay of Digital Spy called it as "genuinely wonderful soundtrack full of well-placed classic soul and funk". Writing for Slate, Dara Stevens opined that the soundtrack was considered as one of the aspects on how Chef "turned out to be the indie hit of the summer". Linda Barnard of Toronto Star wrote "A grabby soundtrack (shades of Swingers' fantastic big band tune-work) heavy on soul and Afro-Cuban beats from the likes of Pete Rodriguez and Perico Hernandez, makes each cooking scene look like a music video."

== Track listing ==
| No. | Title | Artists | Length |
|---|---|---|---|
| 1. | "I Like It Like That" | Pete Rodriguez | 4:25 |
| 2. | "Lucky Man" | Courtney John | 3:16 |
| 3. | "A Message to You, Rudy" | Grant Phabao, Carlton Livingston and Lone Ranger | 5:50 |
| 4. | "Cavern" | Liquid Liquid | 5:17 |
| 5. | "C.R.E.A.M" | El Michels Affair | 2:54 |
| 6. | "Hung Over" | The Martinis | 2:07 |
| 7. | "Que Se Sepa" | Roberto Roena | 3:14 |
| 8. | "Ali Baba" | Louie Ramirez | 4:16 |
| 9. | "Homenaje al Benny (Castellano Que Bueno Baila Usted)" | Gente de Zona | 4:00 |
| 10. | "Mi Swing Es Tropical" | Quantic & Nickodemus | 3:56 |
| 11. | "Bustin' Loose" | Rebirth Brass Band | 3:55 |
| 12. | "Sexual Healing" | Hot 8 Brass Band | 4:59 |
| 13. | "When My Train Pulls In" | Gary Clark Jr. | 7:13 |
| 14. | "Travis County" | Gary Clark Jr. | 3:39 |
| 15. | "West Coast Poplock" | Ronnie Hudson and the Street People | 5:29 |
| 16. | "Oye Como Va" | Perico Hernandez | 4:06 |
| 17. | "La Quimbumba" | Perico Hernandez | 6:05 |
| 18. | "One Second Every Day" | Lyle Workman | 2:22 |

== Charts ==
| Chart (2014) | Peak position |
|---|---|
| Australian Albums (ARIA) | 96 |
| Spanish Albums (Promusicae) | 94 |
| US Billboard 200 | 160 |
| US Independent Albums (Billboard) | 22 |
| US Top Soundtracks (Billboard) | 5 |

== Chef Vol.2 (Original Soundtrack Album) ==
Chef Vol. 2 (Original Motion Picture Soundtrack)

Soundtrack album by Various artists
- Released: May 6, 2015
- Genre: Latin jazz; Afro-Cuban jazz; New Orleans jazz; salsa; country music; blues; soul; funk
- Length: 48:12
- Label: Milan

Chef Vol. 2 (Original Motion Picture Soundtrack) is the soundtrack that contains previously unreleased songs that are featured in the film. It was released on May 6, 2015, by Milan Records, the same date as the original album released.

| No. | Title | Artists | Length |
|---|---|---|---|
| 1. | "Brother John Is Gone / Herc-Jolly-John" | The Wild Magnolias | 5:29 |
| 2. | "Get Down" | Freedom Express | 3:26 |
| 3. | "Bang Bang" | Joe Cuba | 4:06 |
| 4. | "Hustler" | Willie Colón | 6:32 |
| 5. | "Tabaco Y Ron" (TM Juke & The Jack Baker Trio Rework) | Greenwood Rhythm Coalition | 4:41 |
| 6. | "Acid" | Ray Barretto | 5:06 |
| 7. | "Travis County" (Live) | Gary Clark Jr. | 3:42 |
| 8. | "Deep Gully" | Outlaw Blues Band | 5:47 |
| 9. | "Cissy Strut" (Single Version) | The Meters | 3:05 |
| 10. | "Nueva Orleans" | The Heavyweights Brass Band feat. Ogguere | 3:05 |
| 11. | "Hung Up On My Baby" | El Michels Affair | 3:13 |
