= BBQ Brawl =

American food reality television series

- Season 7 infantile
- Also known as: BBQ Brawl: Flay v. Symon (season 1)
- Genre: Food reality television
- Directed by: Peter J. Babington
- Creative director: Manuela Schmidt
- Presented by: Bobby Flay; Michael Symon; Eddie Jackson; Jet Tila; Anne Burrell; Sunny Anderson; Michael Voltaggio; Maneet Chauhan; Antonia Lofaso; Brooke Williamson
- Judges: Moe Cason; Chris Lilly; Amy Mills; Rodney Scott; Brooke Williamson; Carson Kressley; Adrienne Cheatham; Rashad Jones
- Country of origin: United States
- Original language: English
- No. of seasons: 7
- No. of episodes: 61

Production
- Executive producers: Bobby Flay; Kim Martin; Kirsty Nordal; Grant McGahuey
- Producer: Janelle McCracken
- Production locations: Seasons 1 – 3, 5 – 7: Austin, Texas; Season 4: Half Moon Bay, California
- Cinematography: Nathan Hutchins
- Editors: Daniel Moratti; Dmitry Beryozkin; Eric Anderson; David Cutler; Adam Hall; Eli Middleton; Jessie Rogowski; Karrin Ellertson; Anthony Fitzgerald; Kristine Gaffney; Matt Hollywood
- Production company: Rock Shrimp Productions

Original release
- Network: Food Network
- Release: August 1, 2019 – present

BBQ Brawl (titled BBQ Brawl: Flay v. Symon during the first season) is an American cooking reality competition television series that airs on Food Network.

== Production ==
The first three seasons were filmed at the Star Hill Ranch in Austin, Texas, while the fourth season was filmed at Long Branchs Saloon & Farms Half Moon Bay, California.

The first season aired from August 1 to August 22, 2019; and it was presented by chefs Bobby Flay and Michael Symon. Chefs Moe Cason, Chris Lilly and Amy Mills served as judges. It began with eight barbecue chefs in the pilot episode, who were then divided into two teams that were each headed by Flay and Symon. At the end of each episode, one chef from each team was eliminated. The winner in the season finale was awarded the title "Master of 'Cue", which was in turn the name of their subsequent series on FoodNetwork.com.

The second season added chef and former football player Eddie Jackson as a team captain alongside Flay and Symon. Chefs Rodney Scott and Brooke Williamson were added in as the new judges along with television personality Carson Kressley. It aired from June 14 to August 9, 2021.

The third season consisting of eight episodes brought in chefs Jet Tila and Anne Burrell as new captains alongside Flay. It aired from May 9 to June 27, 2022.

In April 2023, Symon revealed that the show was filming a fourth season, but he would not be returning. In June 2023, Warner Bros. Discovery announced that it would premiere on July 10, 2023 with a 90-minute special episode and Sunny Anderson would serve as a captain alongside Flay and Burrell.

In September 2023, Food Network renewed the show for a fifth season which premiered on July 8, 2024. The show returned to Texas for the fifth season, with Michael Voltaggio serving as a captain alongside Flay and Anderson.

In April 2025, TheWrap reported that the sixth season would feature two new chefs, namely Maneet Chauhan and Antonia Lofaso, serving as captains alongside Flay. The season premiered on June 1, 2025.

In February 2026, Flay revealed that Brooke Williamson, who had served as a judge on the show since its second season, would serve as a captain for the seventh season as them dating each other meant they couldn't be impartial to each other. In April 2026, People reported that Williamson and Flay would be joined by a returning Maneet Chauhan, while a returning Carson Kressley would be joined by Adrienne Cheatham and season 3 winner Rashad Jones as judges. The season aired from May 11, 2026 to July 6, 2026.

== Contestants ==
=== Season 1 ===
- KEY
- Team (B)obby
- Team (M)ichael

==== Winner ====
- Lee Ann Whippen (B) – Tampa, Florida

==== Runner-up ====
- Susie Bulloch (M) – Lehi, Utah

==== Eliminated ====
(in order of elimination)

- Joe Pearce (B) – Kansas City, Missouri
- Kevin Bludso (M) – Compton, California
- Carey Bringle (M) – Nashville, Tennessee
- George "Tuffy" Stone (B) – Richmond, Virginia
- Phil Johnson (B) – Phoenix, Arizona
- Lynnae Oxley-Loupe (M) – Battle Ground, Washington

=== Season 2 ===
- KEY
- Team (B)obby
- Team (M)ichael
- Team (E)ddie

==== Winner ====
- Erica Blaire Roby (B) - Dayton, Ohio

==== Runners-up ====
- Ara Malekian (M) - Richmond, Texas
- David Sandusky (M) - St. Louis, Missouri

==== Eliminated ====
(in order of elimination)

- Christina Fitzgerald (M) - St. Louis, Missouri
- Max Hardy (E) - Detroit, Michigan
- Megan Day (E) - Lee's Summit, Missouri
- Brendan Lamb (B) - Roanoke, Texas
- Terry Matthews (B) - Phoenix, Arizona
- Lu Holter (E) - Hudson, Wisconsin
- Taylor Carroll (B) - Atlanta, Georgia
- Christopher Prieto (E) - Knightdale, North Carolina
- Brittani Bo Baker ~~(M)~~(E) - Tampa, Florida

=== Season 3 ===
- KEY
- Team (B)obby
- Team (A)nne
- Team (J)et

==== Winner ====
- Rashad Jones ~~(J)~~(A) - Ocala, Florida

==== Runners-up ====
- Don Nguyen ~~(J)~~(A) - Houston, Texas
- Winnie Yee-Lakhani ~~(A)~~(J) - Fullerton, California

==== Eliminated ====
(in order of elimination)

- James Cruse (B) - New Orleans, Louisiana
- Tony Froyan ~~(A)~~(J) - Maplewood, New Jersey
- Michelle Wallace ~~(A)~~(J) - Houston, Texas
- Matt Roth (B) - Austin, Texas
- Sunny Moody ~~(J)~~~~(A)~~(J) - Nashville, Tennessee
- Tina Cannon (B) - Atlanta, Georgia

=== Season 4 ===
- KEY
- Team (B)obby
- Team (A)nne
- Team (S)unny

==== Winner ====
- Dominique Leach ~~(S)~~(B) - Chicago, Illinois

==== Runners-up ====
- Chuck Matto ~~(B)~~(S) - Vallejo, California
- Harold Villarosa ~~(A)~~(B) - San Francisco, California

==== Eliminated ====
(in order of elimination)

- Kate Neville (A) - Los Angeles, California
- Robert Smith ~~(B)~~(S) - Hempstead, Texas
- Chris Williams ~~(S)~~(B) - Louisville, Kentucky
- Larissa Da Costa ~~(B)~~(S) - Los Angeles, California
- Christie Vanover (A) - Las Vegas, Nevada
- Brian Duffy ~~(B)~~(S) - Philadelphia, Pennsylvania
- Ami Cisneros ~~(S)~~(B) - San Diego, California
- Ippy Aiona (A) - Kamuela, Hawaii
- Chris Binotto ~~(S)~~~~(B)~~(S) - Venice Beach, California

=== Season 5 ===
- KEY
- Team (B)obby
- Team (S)unny
- Team (V)oltaggio

==== Winner ====
- Erica Barrett (B) - Atlanta, Georgia

==== Runners-up ====
- Bruce Kalman (V) - Las Vegas, Nevada
- Hugh Mangum (V) - New York City, New York

==== Eliminated ====
(in order of elimination)

- Noah Sims ~~(S)~~(B) - Epworth, Georgia
- Shannon Snell ~~(S)~~(B) - Gainesville, Florida (withdrew)
- Andrea Nicholson ~~(B)~~(S) - Toronto, Ontario
- Logan Sandoval ~~(B)~~(S) - Simi Valley, California
- Ray Lampe (S) - St. Petersburg, Florida
- Elena Terry (V) - Wisconsin Dells, Wisconsin
- Flora Kamimura ~~(V)~~(S) - Kailua-Kona, Hawaii
- Ashley Turner ~~(B)~~(S) - Milwaukee, Wisconsin
- Sam Cruz ~~(S)~~(B) - Miami, Florida

=== Season 6 ===
- KEY
- Team (B)obby
- Team (A)ntonia
- Team (M)aneet

==== Winner ====
- Kyle Bryner ~~(B)~~(M) - Dillard, Georgia

==== Runners-up ====
- Tyler Anderson (A) - Hartford, Connecticut
- Brad Leighninger (B) - Branson, Missouri

==== Eliminated ====
(in order of elimination)

- Tim Van Doren (A) - Alabaster, Alabama
- Arturo Ramon (M) - Wimberley, Texas
- Alexandra Donnadio (M) - Hillsborough, New Jersey
- Jason Dady (M) - San Antonio, Texas
- Aarthi Sampath (A) - New York City, New York
- Rosalie Bradford Pareja (B) - Clearwater, Florida
- Thyron Mathews (A) - Oelwein, Iowa
- Greg Gatlin (M) - Houston, Texas
- Orchid Paulmeier (B) - Hilton Head Island, South Carolina

=== Season 7 ===
- KEY
- Team (B)obby
- Team Brooke (W)illiamson
- Team (M)aneet

==== Winner ====
- Bob Trudnak (W) --Philadelphia, Pennsylvania

==== Runners-up ====
- Morgan Bolling (W)--Boston, Massachusetts
- Tung Nguyen (B) --New Orleans, Louisiana

==== Eliminated ====
(in order of elimination)

- Vinny Mangual (W) --Brooklyn, New York
- Raquel Fleetwood (W) --Long Beach, California
- Tim McLaughlin (B)--Dallas, Texas
- Blake Stoker (M)--Martin, Tennessee
- Edith Mattiuzzo (B)--Udine, Italy
- Chris Farella ~~(M)~~(W)--Fort Lee, New Jersey
- Braunda Smith (B) --San Antonio, Texas
- Dakari Akorede (M) --Atlanta, Georgia
- Torrece "T" Gregoire (M)--Bristol, Virginia

== Contestant progress ==
=== Season 1 ===
| Rank | Contestant | Episode | | | |
| Rank | Contestant | 1 | 2 | 3 | 4 |
|---|---|---|---|---|---|
| 1 | Lee Ann | IN | BTM | IN | WINNER |
| 2 | Susie | IN | IN | IN | RUNNER-UP |
| 3 | Lynnae | IN | BTM | OUT | |
| 4 | Phil | IN | IN | OUT | |
| 5 | Tuffy | BTM | OUT | | |
| 6 | Carey | BTM | OUT | | |
| 7 | Kevin | OUT | | | |
| 8 | Joe | OUT | | | |

(WINNER) This contestant won the competition and was crowned "Master of 'Cue".
(RUNNER-UP) The contestant was the runner-up in the finals of the competition.
(BTM) The contestant was selected as one of the bottom entries on their team, but was not eliminated.
(OUT) The contestant was eliminated from the competition.

=== Season 2 ===
| Rank | Contestant | Episode | | | | | | | | | |
| Rank | Contestant | 1 | 2 | 3 | 4 | 5 | 6 | 7 | 8 | 9 | 10 |
|---|---|---|---|---|---|---|---|---|---|---|---|
| 1 | Erica | IN | IN | IN | BTM | IN | IN | BTM | IN | IN | WINNER |
| 2 | Ara | IN | IN | IN | IN | IN | IN | IN | IN | BTM | RUNNER-UP |
| 2 | David | BTM | IN | IN | IN | IN | IN | IN | IN | BTM | RUNNER-UP |
| 4 | Brittani | IN | IN | IN | IN | IN | IN | STL | BTM | OUT | |
| 5 | Christopher | IN | BTM | BTM | IN | IN | BTM | IN | OUT | | |
| 6 | Taylor | IN | IN | IN | IN | BTM | IN | OUT | | | |
| 7 | Lu | IN | BTM | IN | IN | IN | OUT | | | | |
| 8 | Terry | IN | IN | IN | IN | OUT | | | | | |
| 9 | Brendan | IN | IN | IN | OUT | | | | | | |
| 10 | Megan | IN | BTM | OUT | | | | | | | |
| 11 | Max | IN | OUT | | | | | | | | |
| 12 | Christina | OUT | | | | | | | | | |

(WINNER) This contestant won the competition and was crowned "Master of 'Cue".
(RUNNER-UP) The contestant was the runner-up in the finals of the competition.
(IN) The contestant was among the members of the first team to be safe in the challenge.
(IN) The contestant was among the members of the second team to be safe in the challenge.
(STL) The contestant was stolen by a rival team captain using their "Steal Card".
(BTM) The contestant was selected as one of the bottom entries on their team, but was not eliminated.
(OUT) The contestant was eliminated from the competition.

=== Season 3 ===
| Rank | Contestant | Episode | | | | | | | |
| Rank | Contestant | 1 | 2 | 3 | 4 | 5 | 6 | 7 | 8 |
|---|---|---|---|---|---|---|---|---|---|
| 1 | Rashad | SWC | IN | IN | IN | IN | IN | IN | WINNER |
| 2 | Don | SWC | IN | IN | IN | IN | IN | IN | RUNNER-UP |
| 2 | Winnie | SWC | IN | BTM | BTM | IN | IN | IN | RUNNER-UP |
| 4 | Tina | IN | IN | IN | IN | BTM | IN | OUT | |
| 5 | Sunny | SWC | IN | IN | IN | STL | OUT | | |
| 6 | Matt | IN | BTM | IN | IN | OUT | | | |
| 7 | Michelle | SWC | IN | IN | OUT | | | | |
| 8 | Tony | SWC | IN | OUT | | | | | |
| 9 | James | IN | OUT | | | | | | |

(WINNER) This contestant won the competition and was crowned "Master of 'Cue".
(RUNNER-UP) The contestant was the runner-up in the finals of the competition.
(IN) The contestant was among the members of the first team to be safe in the challenge.
(IN) The contestant was among the members of the second team to be safe in the challenge.
(SWC) The contestant was switched to another team.
(STL) The contestant was stolen by a rival team captain using their "Steal Card".
(BTM) The contestant was selected as one of the bottom entries on their team, but was not eliminated.
(OUT) The contestant was eliminated from the competition.

=== Season 4 ===
| Rank | Contestant | Episode | | | | | | | | | |
| Rank | Contestant | 1 | 2 | 3 | 4 | 5 | 6 | 7 | 8 | 9 | 10 |
|---|---|---|---|---|---|---|---|---|---|---|---|
| 1 | Dominique | SWC | IN | IN | IN | IN | IN | IN | IN | IN | WINNER |
| 2 | Chuck | SWC | IN | BTM | IN | BTM | IN | BTM | IN | BTM | RUNNER-UP |
| 2 | Harold | IN | IN | IN | IN | IN | IN | IN | IN | STL | RUNNER-UP |
| 4 | Binotto | SWC | IN | IN | IN | IN | IN | IN | STL | OUT | |
| 4 | Ippy | IN | IN | IN | IN | IN | BTM | IN | IN | OUT | |
| 6 | Ami | SWC | IN | IN | BTM | IN | IN | IN | OUT | | |
| 7 | Duffy | SWC | IN | IN | IN | IN | IN | OUT | | | |
| 8 | Christie | IN | BTM | IN | IN | IN | OUT | | | | |
| 9 | Larissa | SWC | IN | IN | IN | OUT | | | | | |
| 10 | Chris | SWC | IN | IN | OUT | | | | | | |
| 11 | Robert | SWC | IN | OUT | | | | | | | |
| 12 | Kate | IN | OUT | | | | | | | | |

(WINNER) This contestant won the competition and was crowned "Master of 'Cue".
(RUNNER-UP) The contestant was the runner-up in the finals of the competition.
(IN) The contestant was among the members of the first team to be safe in the challenge.
(IN) The contestant was among the members of the second team to be safe in the challenge.
(SWC) The contestant was switched to another team.
(STL) The contestant was stolen by a rival team captain using their "Steal Card".
(BTM) The contestant was selected as one of the bottom entries on their team, but was not eliminated.
(OUT) The contestant was eliminated from the competition.

=== Season 5 ===
| Rank | Contestant | Episode | | | | | | | | | |
| Rank | Contestant | 1 | 2 | 3 | 4 | 5 | 6 | 7 | 8 | 9 | 10 |
|---|---|---|---|---|---|---|---|---|---|---|---|
| 1 | Erica | FP | IN | IN | IN | BTM | IN | IN | IN | BTM | WINNER |
| 2 | Bruce | IN | IN | IN | IN | IN | BTM | IN | IN | IN | RUNNER-UP |
| 2 | Hugh | FP | IN | IN | IN | IN | IN | IN | IN | IN | RUNNER-UP |
| 4 | Sam | SWC | BTM | IN | IN | IN | IN | IN | IN | OUT | |
| 5 | Ashley | SWC | IN | BTM | IN | IN | IN | BTM | OUT | | |
| 6 | Flora | IN | IN | IN | IN | IN | STL | OUT | | | |
| 7 | Elena | IN | IN | IN | IN | BTM | OUT | | | | |
| 8 | Ray | FP | IN | IN | BTM | OUT | | | | | |
| 9 | Logan | SWC | IN | IN | OUT | | | | | | |
| 10 | Andrea | SWC | IN | OUT | | | | | | | |
| 11 | Shannon | SWC | IN | WDW | | | | | | | |
| 12 | Noah | SWC | OUT | | | | | | | | |

(WINNER) This contestant won the competition and was crowned "Master of 'Cue".
(RUNNER-UP) The contestant was the runner-up in the finals of the competition.
(IN) The contestant was among the members of the first team to be safe in the challenge.
(IN) The contestant was among the members of the second team to be safe in the challenge.
(FP) The contestant was chosen by the captain as the team's franchise player and is immune from the "Team Switch".
(SWC) The contestant was switched to another team.
(STL) The contestant was stolen by a rival team captain using their "Steal Card".
(BTM) The contestant was selected as one of the bottom entries on their team, but was not eliminated.
(OUT) The contestant was eliminated from the competition.
(WDW) The contestant withdrew from the competition.

=== Season 6 ===
| Rank | Contestant | Episode | | | | | | | | | |
| Rank | Contestant | 1 | 2 | 3 | 4 | 5 | 6 | 7 | 8 | 9 | 10 |
|---|---|---|---|---|---|---|---|---|---|---|---|
| 1 | Kyle | IN | IN | IN | IN | STL | IN | IN | IN | IN | WINNER |
| 2 | Tyler | IN | IN | IN | IN | IN | IN | IN | BTM | IN | RUNNER-UP |
| 2 | Brad | IN | IN | IN | IN | IN | IN | IN | IN | IN | RUNNER-UP |
| 4 | Orchid | IN | IN | IN | IN | IN | IN | BTM | IN | OUT | |
| 5 | Greg | IN | BTM | IN | BTM | IN | IN | IN | IN | OUT | |
| 6 | Thyron | IN | IN | IN | IN | IN | BTM | IN | OUT | | |
| 7 | Rosalie | IN | IN | IN | IN | IN | IN | OUT | | | |
| 8 | Aarthi | BTM | IN | IN | IN | IN | OUT | | | | |
| 9 | Jason | IN | IN | BTM | OUT | | | | | | |
| 10 | Alexandra | IN | IN | OUT | | | | | | | |
| 11 | Arturo | IN | OUT | | | | | | | | |
| 12 | Tim | OUT | | | | | | | | | |

(WINNER) This contestant won the competition and was crowned "Master of 'Cue".
(RUNNER-UP) The contestant was the runner-up in the finals of the competition.
(IN) The contestant was among the members of the first team to be safe in the challenge.
(IN) The contestant was among the members of the second team to be safe in the challenge.
(STL) The contestant was stolen by a rival team captain using their "Steal Card".
(BTM) The contestant was selected as one of the bottom entries on their team, but was not eliminated.
(OUT) The contestant was eliminated from the competition.
(WDW) The contestant withdrew from the competition.

=== Season 7 ===
| Rank | Contestant | Episode | | | | | | | | |
| Rank | Contestant | 1 | 2 | 3 | 4 | 5 | 6 | 7 | 8 | 9 |
|---|---|---|---|---|---|---|---|---|---|---|
| 1 | Bob | IN | IN | IN | IN | IN | IN | IN | IN | WINNER |
| 2 | Morgan | IN | IN | IN | IN | IN | IN | BTM | IN | RUNNER-UP |
| 2 | Tung | IN | IN | IN | IN | IN | IN | IN | IN | RUNNER-UP |
| 4 | T | IN | IN | IN | IN | IN | IN | IN | OUT | |
| 5 | Dakari | IN | IN | IN | IN | BTM | IN | OUT | | |
| 6 | Braunda | IN | IN | IN | IN | IN | BTM | WDW | | |
| 7 | Chris | IN | IN | IN | STL | IN | OUT | | | |
| 8 | Edith | BTM | BTM | IN | IN | OUT | | | | |
| 9 | Blake | IN | IN | BTM | OUT | | | | | |
| 10 | Tim | IN | IN | OUT | | | | | | |
| 11 | Raquel | IN | OUT | | | | | | | |
| 12 | Vinny | OUT | | | | | | | | |

(WINNER) This contestant won the competition and was crowned "Master of 'Cue".
(RUNNER-UP) The contestant was the runner-up in the finals of the competition.
(IN) The contestant was among the members of the first team to be safe in the challenge.
(IN) The contestant was among the members of the second team to be safe in the challenge.
(IN) The contestant won the challenge for their team.
(STL) The contestant was stolen by a rival team captain during the half-time re-draft.
(BTM) The contestant was selected as one of the bottom entries on their team, but was not eliminated.
(OUT) The contestant was eliminated from the competition.
(WDW) The contestant withdrew from the competition.

== Episodes ==
| Season | Episodes | Originally released | |
| Season | Episodes | First released | Last released |
|---|---|---|---|
| 1 | 4 | August 1, 2019 | August 22, 2019 |
| 2 | 10 | June 14, 2021 | August 9, 2021 |
| 3 | 8 | May 9, 2022 | June 27, 2022 |
| 4 | 10 | July 10, 2023 | September 4, 2023 |
| 5 | 10 | July 8, 2024 | September 2, 2024 |
| 6 | 10 | June 1, 2025 | July 27, 2025 |
| 7 | 9 | May 11, 2026 | July 6, 2026 |

=== Season 1 (2019) ===
| No. | Title | Original air date | Rating (18-49) | Viewers (millions) |
|---|---|---|---|---|
| 1 | "Backyard BBQ" | August 1, 2019 | 0.3 | 1.00 |
| 2 | "High Steaks" | August 8, 2019 | 0.2 | 0.94 |
| 3 | "Winging It" | August 15, 2019 | 0.2 | 0.82 |
| 4 | "Going Whole Hog" | August 22, 2019 | 0.2 | 1.03 |

=== Season 2 (2021) ===
| No. | Title | Original air date | Rating (18-49) | Viewers (millions) |
|---|---|---|---|---|
| 1 | "Introduce Your 'Cue" | June 14, 2021 | 0.2 | 0.95 |
| 2 | "Hometown Favorites" | June 21, 2021 | 0.2 | 0.97 |
| 3 | "BBQ Hacks" | June 28, 2021 | 0.2 | 0.80 |
| 4 | "Game Day BBQ" | July 5, 2021 | 0.2 | 0.89 |
| 5 | "Competition 'Cue" | July 12, 2021 | 0.2 | 0.78 |
| 6 | "BBQ Brunch Battle" | July 19, 2021 | 0.2 | 0.99 |
| 7 | "Seafood Showdown" | July 26, 2021 | 0.2 | 0.68 |
| 8 | "BBQ Around the World" | August 2, 2021 | 0.2 | 0.72 |
| 9 | "Future 'Cue" | August 9, 2021 | 0.2 | 0.89 |
| 10 | "Master of 'Cue" | August 9, 2021 | 0.2 | 0.81 |

=== Season 3 (2022) ===
| No. | Title | Original air date | Rating (18-49) | Viewers (millions) |
|---|---|---|---|---|
| 1 | " 'Cue the Introductions " | May 9, 2022 | 0.2 | 0.88 |
| 2 | "BBQ Games" | May 16, 2022 | 0.2 | 0.87 |
| 3 | "Backyard BBQ" | May 23, 2022 | 0.2 | 0.95 |
| 4 | "Throwback BBQ" | May 30, 2022 | 0.2 | 0.83 |
| 5 | "You Gotta Beef with Me?!" | June 6, 2022 | 0.2 | 0.93 |
| 6 | "Not Your Average 'Cue" | June 13, 2022 | 0.1 | 0.79 |
| 7 | "Social Media Connection" | June 20, 2022 | 0.2 | 0.84 |
| 8 | "Impress Us" | June 27, 2022 | 0.2 | 0.96 |

=== Season 4 (2023) ===
| No. | Title | Original air date |
|---|---|---|
| 1 | "Welcome to California!" | July 10, 2023 |
| 2 | "2nd Annual BBQ Games" | July 17, 2023 |
| 3 | "Fisherman's Wharf War" | July 24, 2023 |
| 4 | "Hurts So Good" | July 31, 2023 |
| 5 | "Takin' It to the Next Level" | August 7, 2023 |
| 6 | "Live Fire, Live Wire" | August 14, 2023 |
| 7 | "Fancy Schmancy" | August 21, 2023 |
| 8 | "Triple Rib Showdown" | August 28, 2023 |
| 9 | "A Trip Down Memory Lane" | September 4, 2023 |
| 10 | "Impress Us" | September 4, 2023 |

=== Season 5 (2024) ===
| No. | Title | Original air date | Rating (18-49) | Viewers (millions) |
|---|---|---|---|---|
| 1 | "Howdy Again, Texas!" | July 8, 2024 | 0.1 | 0.57 |
| 2 | "3rd Annual BBQ Games" | July 15, 2024 | 0.1 | 0.54 |
| 3 | "On the Road Again" | July 22, 2024 | 0.1 | 0.56 |
| 4 | "Nose to Tail" | July 29, 2024 | 0.1 | 0.43 |
| 5 | "BBQ Hacks" | August 5, 2024 | 0.0 | 0.33 |
| 6 | "Red, White and 'Cue" | August 12, 2024 | 0.1 | 0.58 |
| 7 | "State Fair Fare" | August 19, 2024 | 0.1 | 0.59 |
| 8 | "BBQ Triple Threat" | August 26, 2024 | 0.1 | 0.55 |
| 9 | "I Do 'Cue" | September 2, 2024 | 0.1 | 0.56 |
| 10 | "Mission 'Cue" | September 2, 2024 | 0.1 | 0.51 |

=== Season 6 (2025) ===
| No. | Title | Original air date | Rating (18-49) | Viewers (millions) |
|---|---|---|---|---|
| 1 | "Cookin' Up Something New" | June 1, 2025 | 0.1 | 0.74 |
| 2 | "4th Annual BBQ Games" | June 8, 2025 | 0.1 | 0.66 |
| 3 | "Global Live-Fire Feast" | June 8, 2025 | 0.1 | 0.56 |
| 4 | "Judges' Day Off" | June 15, 2025 | 0.1 | 0.70 |
| 5 | "$10,000 Showdown" | June 22, 2025 | 0.1 | 0.75 |
| 6 | "Chuck Wagon Wars" | June 29, 2025 | 0.1 | 0.85 |
| 7 | "To Meat ... Or Not to Meat" | July 6, 2025 | 0.1 | 0.68 |
| 8 | "Into the Fire!" | July 13, 2025 | 0.1 | 0.75 |
| 9 | "BBQ Duels" | July 20, 2025 | 0.1 | 0.81 |
| 10 | "Feast All Night" | July 27, 2025 | 0.1 | 0.75 |

=== Season 7 (2026) ===
| No. | Title | Original air date | Rating (18-49) | Viewers (millions) |
|---|---|---|---|---|
| 1 | "The BBQ Remix" | May 11, 2026 | 0.1 | 0.52 |
| 2 | "BBQ Hall" | May 18, 2026 | 0.1 | 0.54 |
| 3 | "5th Annual BBQ Games" | May 25, 2026 | 0.1 | 0.55 |
| 4 | "Halftime Shake-Up" | June 1, 2026 | 0.1 | 0.54 |
| 5 | "Vertical 'Cue" | June 8, 2026 | 0.1 | 0.49 |
| 6 | "Capital City 'Cue" | June 15, 2026 | 0.1 | 0.59 |
| 7 | "Primal BBQ" | June 22, 2026 | — | 0.62 |
| 8 | "Stars, Strips, and Smoke" | June 29, 2026 | — | — |
| 9 | "The Great BBQ Gauntlet" | July 6, 2026 | 0.1 | 0.65 |
