= Christopher Prieto =

American restaurateur and pitmaster

Christopher Prieto is an American pitmaster, restaurateur and cookbook author. He is co-author of Southern Living’s Ultimate Book of BBQ. In 2025, he was named a semifinalist for the James Beard Foundation Award for Best Chef: Southeast. He has been featured in Southern Living, and his restaurant has received Michelin Guide to the American South with a Bib Gourmand designation.

== Biography ==
He was raised in Texas by parents who immigrated from Puerto Rico. His early exposure to barbecue came through family gatherings and meals. Prieto attended East Carolina University, where he studied prior to launching his professional barbecue career.

== Career ==
Prieto began competing in barbecue competitions at approximately age 21. Over the next 14 years, he traveled across the United States on the barbecue circuit. He led winning teams in the Kansas City Barbecue Society (KSBS). In 2011, he was named Grand Champion at the Beer, Bourbon, &amp; Barbecue Festival in Cary, North Carolina.

Before opening his own restaurant, he worked for nearly a decade as a manager and trainer for Carrabba’s Italian Grill.

In March 2020, during the early months of the COVID-19 pandemic, Prieto opened Prime Barbecue in Knightdale, North Carolina. The restaurant has been mentioned in the inaugural Michelin Guide for the American South with a Bib Gourmand designation. It has been featured in Southern Living’s list of the 50 best barbecue joints in the South and consistently placed as the top barbecue restaurant in North Carolina in Southern Living’s South’s Best Poll. The restaurant has also been ranked in Texas Monthly’s list of top Texas-style barbecue establishments outside Texas. In 2023, Prieto expanded his culinary offerings with Primo Latin Cuisine, a food truck located behind Prime Barbecue. The concept celebrates his Puerto Rican heritage through Latin-inspired dishes that incorporate barbecue techniques and flavors. Prieto’s second restaurant, Prime STQ, a hybrid steakhouse and barbecue concept, is under construction at the Horseshoe Hub development in Durham, North Carolina. The restaurant is slated to open in 2026 and has been highlighted by Axios Raleigh as one of the most anticipated restaurant openings in the Research Triangle area.

Prieto has participated on competitive national television programs focused on barbecue and competitive cooking, including BBQ Pitmasters, BBQ Brawl with Bobby Flay and Michael Symon, Chopped, and Man Fire Food. He has contributed as a co-author to Southern Living’s Ultimate Book of BBQ: The Complete Year-Round Guide to Grilling and Smoking.

== Awards ==
- James Beard Foundation Award Semifinalist, Best Chef: Southeast (2025)
- Bib Gourmand designation, Michelin Guide to the American South (Prime Barbecue)
- Triangle Business Journal 40 Under 40 (2021)
- North Carolina Restaurant & Lodging Association Restaurateur of the Year (2026)
- Grand Champion, Beer, Bourbon, & Barbecue Festival, Cary, NC (2011)

== See also ==
- BBQ Brawl
- BBQ Pitmasters
