= Dominique Leach =

American chef

- Born: Chicago, Illinois
- Education: Illinois Institute of Art – Chicago
- Culinary career
- Cooking style: Barbecue
- Current restaurant: Lexington Betty's Smokehouse

Dominique Leach is the owner and chef of Lexington Betty's Smokehouse in Chicago. She has been featured on food television programs, including Chopped, Fire Masters, and BBQ Brawl.

== Biography ==
Leach was born in Chicago and grew up in Humboldt Park by a single mother. While her mother did not have much time to cook, Leach experienced her grandmother's cooking during twice-annual visits. Her grandmother, Betty King, was from Lexington, Missouri, inspiring the name of the restaurant.

After graduating from high school at sixteen, Leach attended culinary school at the Illinois Institute of Art – Chicago, graduating in 2006. She found that, as a Black, queer woman, she often had to work harder than her peers. In October 2006, she began working at the Renaissance Hotel Chicago and worked her way from grill cook to kitchen supervisor in 2007.

In 2008, Leach went to work at the Art Institute of Chicago, where she worked with Raghavan Iyer. While sous chef at the Art Institute of Chicago, she decided to leave to take a lower-paying job working under Tony Mantuano and Sarah Grueneberg at Spiaggia. She was invited to work with Mantuano at the pop-up restaurant at the US Open, where she was offered a role in banquets at Spiaggia. In 2011, Leach left to work at a Chicago off-premise catering company and then worked as executive chef at Zelda's Kosher Catering. Wanting to begin her own catering company, Leach went on to work as a line cook at Four Seasons Hotel Chicago to give her the time to develop her own company.

In 2016, Leach and her wife, Tanisha Griffin, started a company, “Cater to You Events & Drop Offs,” catering parties and weddings. However, they struggled to build a following. After hearing Ludacris talk about building his career by starting with the Black and urban community, Leach decided to try doing the same, by opening a barbecue restaurant.

In June 2017, Leach purchased a food truck. However, after just a few months, the truck was set on fire in front of her home. Griffin left her career to help Leach rebuild, and friends and family supported the couple as they moved from their homes at the police's recommendation.

In 2018, Leach and Griffin replaced the food truck. The next year, they gained popularity following a live cooking demo in the WGN America studios. In September, 2019, they opened a physical location in Galewood. A few months later, as part of a pilot project promoting Black-owned businesses, they opened a stall at the OneEleven food hall. When two other residents left OneEleven due to the pandemic, Lexington Betty expanded into the space. In August 2020, they opened a location in the medical district. In 2022, they opened a South Side location. She also opened a product line selling Wagyu hot dog franks.

Lexington Betty's local and national success gained Leach the title of "pitmaster".

== Television ==
Leach has been featured in food television programs.

- 2021: Toon In with Me
- 2021: Chopped, contestant
- 2022: Fire Masters, judge and contestant
- 2023: BBQ Brawl, contestant, winner ("Master of Cue")
