= Hatfield's =

Defunct restaurant in California, U.S.

- Interactive map of Hatfield's

Restaurant information
- Established: 2006
- Closed: 2014; 12 years ago
- Owners: Quinn Hatfield; Karen Hatfield
- Location: 6703 Melrose Avenue, Los Angeles, California, 90038, United States
- Coordinates: 34°5′1″N 118°20′23.5″W

Hatfield's was a restaurant in Los Angeles, California.

== History ==
Episode 16 of the 3rd season of MasterChef (American TV series) was filmed at Hatfield's with contestants cooking a dinner service that included serving the restaurant owners.

The restaurant was used as a filming location for the 2014 film Chef, directed by Jon Favreau.

The restaurant closed in 2014.

== Reception ==
Hatfield's received high acclaim including 3 stars from the Los Angeles Times, Best New Restaurant from Bon Appétit and Angelo Magazine, as well as a Michelin star in 2009.

== See also ==
- List of defunct restaurants of the United States
- List of Michelin-starred restaurants in California
