= Chef (2014 film) =

2014 film by Jon Favreau

- Theatrical release poster
- Directed by: Jon Favreau
- Written by: Jon Favreau
- Produced by: Jon Favreau; Sergei Bespalov
- Starring: Jon Favreau; Sofía Vergara; John Leguizamo; Scarlett Johansson; Oliver Platt; Bobby Cannavale; Amy Sedaris; Emjay Anthony; Dustin Hoffman; Robert Downey Jr.
- Cinematography: Kramer Morgenthau
- Edited by: Robert Leighton
- Production companies: Aldamisa Entertainment; Fairview Entertainment; Fetisov Teterin Films; Prescience; Altus Media; Kilburn Media
- Distributed by: Open Road Films (United States); Lionsgate (United Kingdom)
- Release dates: March 7, 2014 (SXSW); May 9, 2014 (United States); June 5, 2014 (Russia); June 27, 2014 (United Kingdom)
- Running time: 114 minutes
- Countries: United States; United Kingdom; Russia
- Language: English
- Budget: $11 million
- Box office: $49.8 million

Chef is a 2014 road comedy drama film written, produced, and directed by Jon Favreau. Favreau plays a celebrity chef who establishes a food truck business with his friends and young son. It co-stars Sofía Vergara, John Leguizamo, Scarlett Johansson, Oliver Platt, Bobby Cannavale, Amy Sedaris, Emjay Anthony, and Dustin Hoffman. Robert Downey Jr. appears in a cameo.

Favreau wrote the script after directing several big-budget films, wanting to go "back to basics" and to create a film about cooking. The chef Roy Choi was a co-producer and oversaw the menus and food prepared for the film. Principal photography took place in July 2013 in Los Angeles, Miami, Austin and New Orleans.

Chef premiered at South by Southwest on March 7, 2014, and was released theatrically in the United States on May 9, 2014, by Open Road Films. It was well received by critics, who praised the direction, music, writing, story, and performances, and grossed $49.8 million on a budget of $11 million.

== Plot ==
Miami-born Carl Casper is the head chef at Gauloises, an upscale restaurant in Brentwood, Los Angeles. Though well-liked by his kitchen staff and hostess Molly, he frequently clashes with the restaurant's owner, Riva, who insists on a safe, traditional menu rather than the innovative cuisine Carl longs to create. Outside the kitchen, Carl has strained relationships with his wealthy ex-wife, Inez, and their tech-savvy preteen son, Percy. When renowned food critic and blogger Ramsey Michel plans a visit, Carl hopes to impress him with a bold new menu. At the last minute, however, Riva forces him to serve the restaurant's standard fare instead, leading to a scathing review. Carl sends Ramsey an angry reply on Twitter, unaware that his comments are public, and quickly becomes an online sensation.

Determined to redeem himself, Carl develops a new menu and invites Ramsey back for a rematch. But on the night of the event, Riva once again demands that Carl abandon his creative vision and prepare the traditional menu. A furious Carl quits on the spot. At home, Carl channels his frustration into cooking the meal he had wanted to serve. Meanwhile, Ramsey is dismayed to receive the same uninspired dishes he was given before and, learning that Carl quit before honoring their challenge, publicly mocks him as a coward. Enraged, Carl confronts Ramsey at the restaurant, and videos of Carl's ensuing meltdown go viral, leaving him humiliated and effectively unemployable.

Seeking a fresh start, Carl reluctantly accepts Inez's invitation to join her and Percy on a trip to Miami, where he rediscovers his passion for Cuban cuisine. Encouraged by Inez, her other ex-husband, Marvin, offers Carl a rundown Grumman food truck as a way to rebuild his career. Carl and Percy bond while restoring the truck and shopping for supplies. Carl's former line cook, Martin, turns down a promotion at Gauloises to join the venture. Carl, Martin, and Percy set off on a cross-country journey back to Los Angeles, serving Cuban sandwiches and yuca fries from the truck. Percy uses social media to build a following, and the business gains momentum with successful stops in New Orleans and Austin, where Carl incorporates local flavors into daily specials such as po’ boys, beignets, and barbecued brisket.

By the time they reach Los Angeles, Carl has rebuilt both his career and his relationship with Percy. Ramsey visits the food truck and explains his harsh review: as an early admirer of Carl's work, he was disappointed by a meal that he felt was far below the chef's abilities. Impressed by Carl's renewed creativity and passion, Ramsey offers to finance a new restaurant where Carl will have complete artistic freedom. Six months later, the new restaurant is thriving, and Carl and Inez celebrate their remarriage there, surrounded by family and friends.

== Cast ==
- Jon Favreau as Carl Casper
- Sofía Vergara as Inez
- John Leguizamo as Martin
- Scarlett Johansson as Molly
- Dustin Hoffman as Riva
- Oliver Platt as Ramsey Michel
- Bobby Cannavale as Tony
- Amy Sedaris as Jen
- Emjay Anthony as Percy
- Robert Downey Jr. as Marvin
- Russell Peters as Miami cop

Musician Gary Clark Jr., Franklin Barbecue owner Aaron Franklin, and general manager Benjamin Jacob make cameo appearances as themselves. Veteran Miami Cuban musician Jose Caridad Hernandez "Perico" appears as Inez's father and Percy's grandfather ("Abuelito").

== Production ==
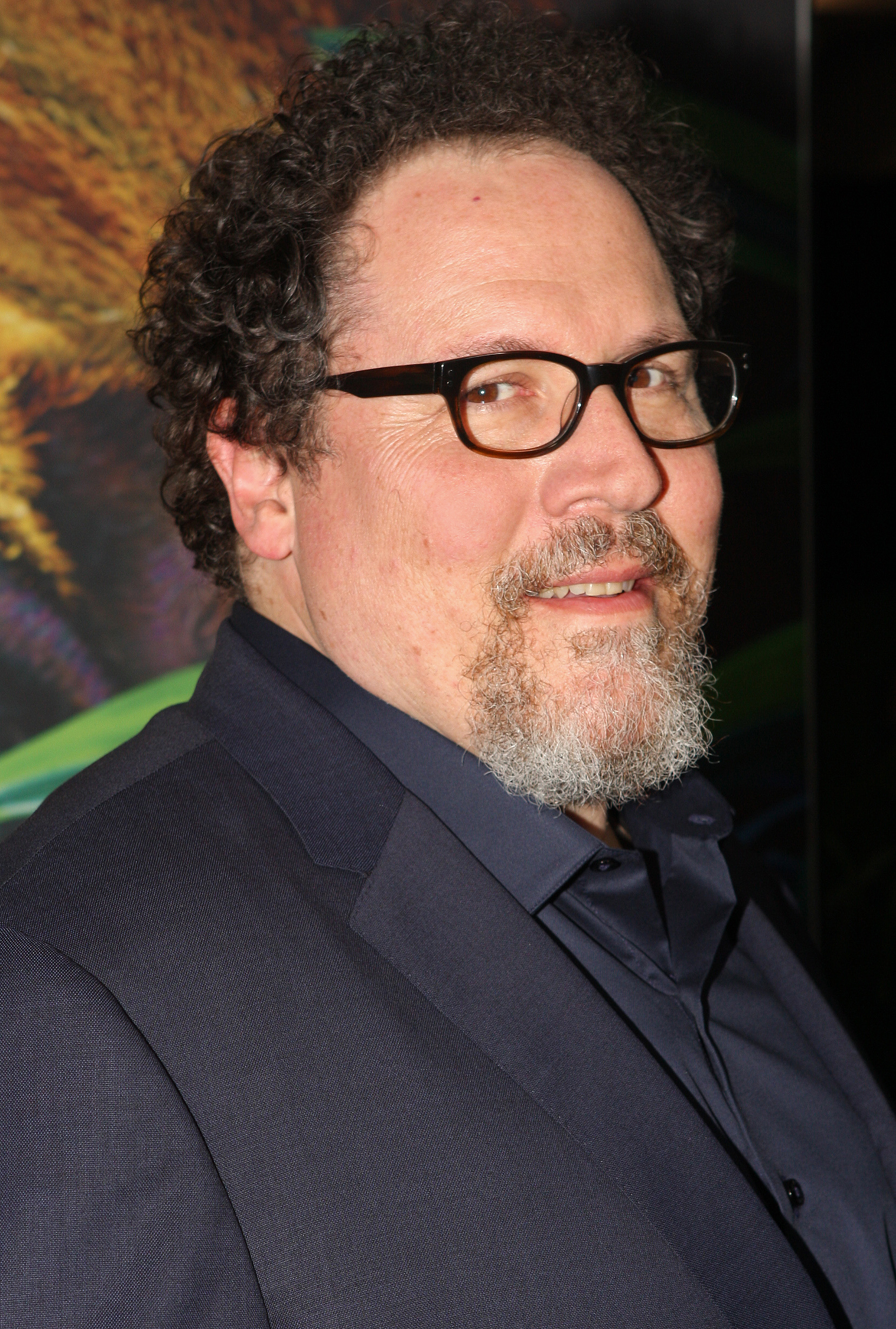
Jon Favreau wrote, directed, and starred in Chef.

=== Development ===
Jon Favreau, the writer, director, and star of Chef, wrote the film's script in about two weeks. He had long wanted to make a film about food and chefs, and felt that the subject was suited to a small-scale independent film rather than a big-budget production. He cited Jiro Dreams of Sushi, Eat Drink Man Woman, and Big Night as inspirations for creating a food-centric film.

The script was semi-autobiographical, incorporating parts of Favreau's life into the main character, such as being a father while having a busy career and coming from a "broken home". Favreau also drew a comparison between his career as a director and Carl's career as a chef; he stepped down from directing major studio films to go "back to basics" and create Chef on a smaller budget, much like Carl's resignation from a popular restaurant to work in a food truck.

Favreau contacted Roy Choi, a restaurateur who created the Kogi Korean BBQ food truck, to serve as a consultant on the film; Choi was eventually promoted to co-producer. While the film was in pre-production, Favreau shadowed Choi in his restaurants and worked as part of Choi's kitchen crew after training at a culinary school. Choi oversaw the menus prepared for the film and created the Cuban sandwiches that form a central part of the storyline.

=== Casting ===
In addition to Favreau, the first actors cast in main roles were Sofía Vergara, John Leguizamo and Bobby Cannavale. To prepare for his role as Martin the line cook, Leguizamo spent time working as an actual line cook at The Lion in the West Village. It was announced that Robert Downey Jr.‍—‌whom Favreau had previously directed in two Iron Man films‍—‌had joined the cast in May 2013. Scarlett Johansson and Dustin Hoffman were cast later that month. Favreau felt the casting was one of the film's biggest successes, which provided him with "a tremendous amount of confidence"; in particular, he was impressed by Emjay Anthony, who was ten years old at the time of filming.

=== Filming ===
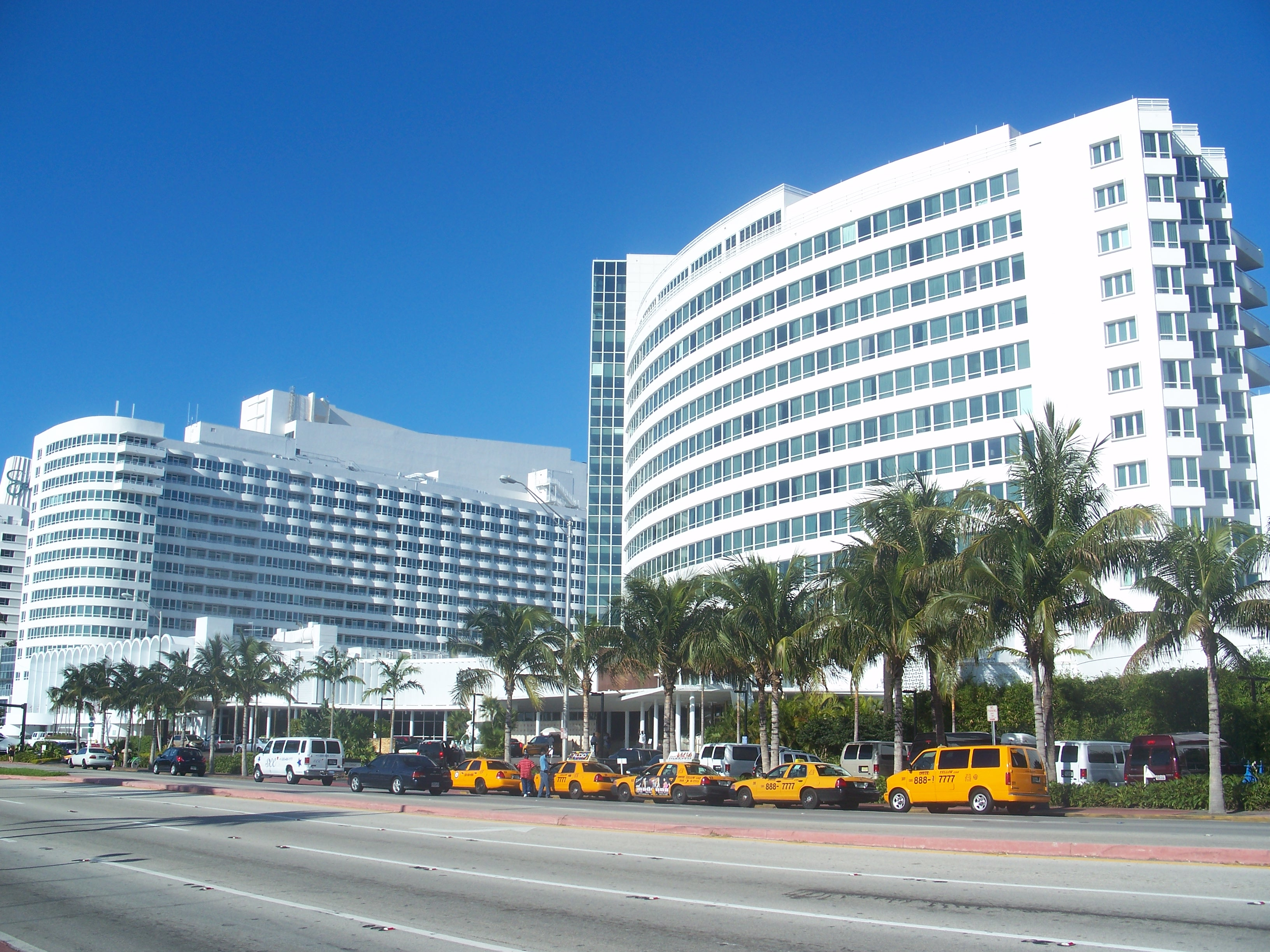
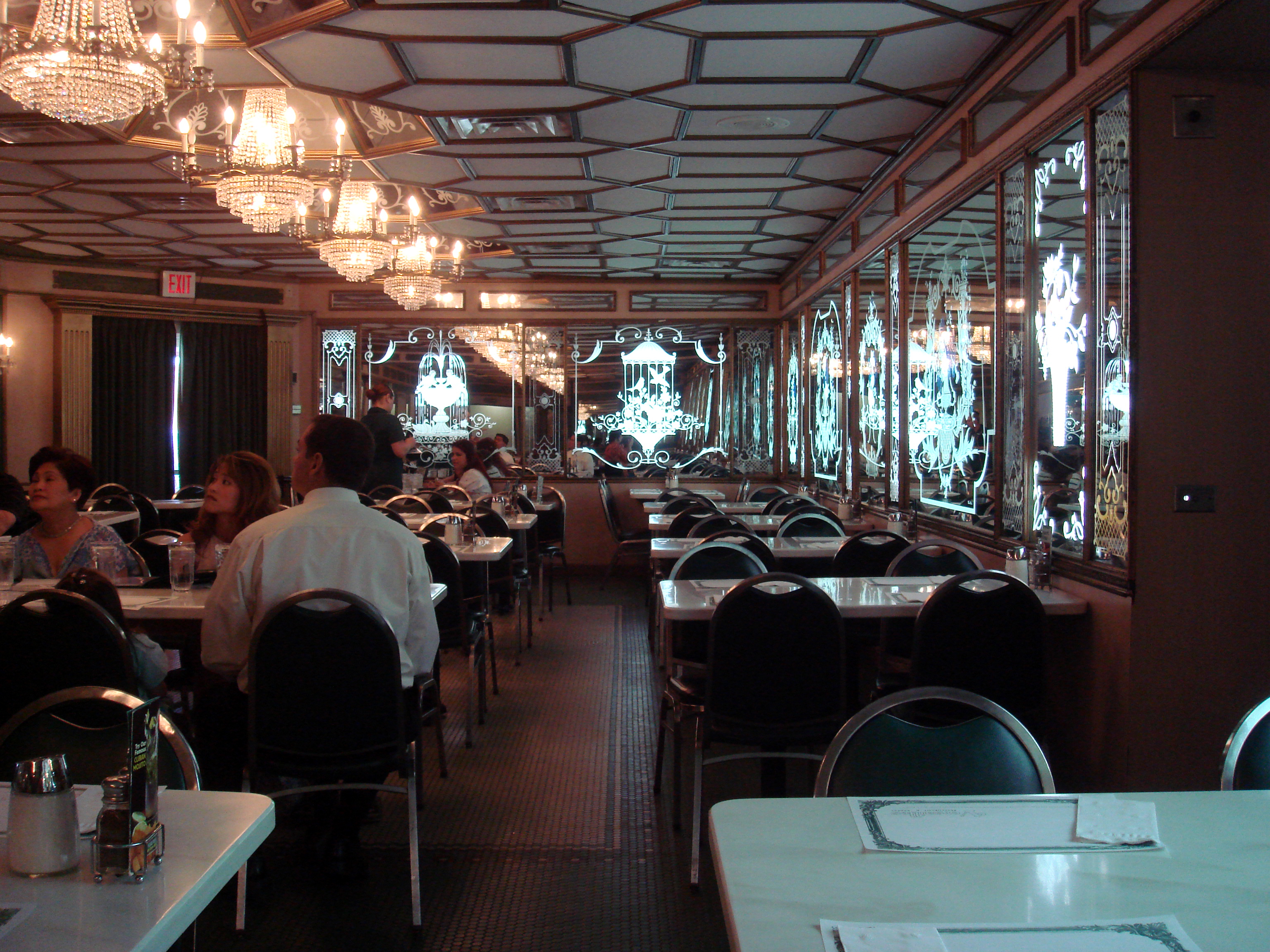
Scenes in Miami were filmed at the Fontainebleau Hotel (left) and the Versailles restaurant (right).

Principal photography of the film began in July 2013 in Los Angeles. Subsequent filming took place in Miami, Austin and New Orleans—cities that Favreau chose to work into the story because they all "possess a rich food and music culture". Filming locations in Miami included the Versailles restaurant, the Fontainebleau Hotel, and the Cuban nightclub Hoy Como Ayer in Little Havana. In New Orleans, some scenes were filmed at Café du Monde in the city's French Quarter.

In Austin, filming locations included Franklin Barbecue and Guero's on South Congress. Scenes of the restaurant Gauloises were filmed at Hatfield's, a fine dining restaurant in Los Angeles. The scenes of restoring of the food truck were filmed in the storage yard of Monte Collins Backhoe and Equipment, Inc., in Los Alamitos. Filming of the shopping scene took place in Los Angeles at Charlie's Fixtures. The filming of the final scenes of the food truck back in Los Angeles took place at Abbot Kinney in Venice during a First Friday

Food prepared for the shoot was eaten by the cast and crew after filming. Much of the dialogue in the food truck scenes between Favreau, John Leguizamo, and Emjay Anthony was improvised in order to capture the banter of a kitchen environment.

== Soundtrack ==
Milan Records released a Chef soundtrack on May 6, 2014, three days before the film's release. The soundtrack is a combination of Latin jazz, New Orleans jazz and blues, which serve as background to the storyline as it moves through Miami, New Orleans and Austin, respectively. The film's music was chosen by music supervisor Mathieu Schreyer, while additional incidental music was scored by Lyle Workman.

== Release ==
Chef premiered on March 7, 2014, at South by Southwest, where it was the opening film of the festival and was attended by Favreau, Leguizamo, Anthony, and Platt. It was subsequently screened at the Tribeca Film Festival in April. On August 19, Open Road Films announced to re-release the film in the United States on August 29 for a Labor Day weekend, which would grow 100 screens to 600–800.

=== Home media ===
Chef came out on September 30, 2014 on DVD and Blu-ray.

=== Box office ===
The film was released theatrically in the United States on May 9, 2014, beginning in limited release in six theaters and expanding throughout May and June to a peak of 1,298 theaters. Its total gross in the United States as of November 2, 2014 is $31.4 million.

Outside of the U.S., Chef performed best in Australia (earning $2.8 million), the United Kingdom and Spain ($2.6 million in each country) and Mexico (earning a little over $1 million). In total, Chef has grossed almost $15 million outside the United States.

=== Critical response ===
On review aggregation website Rotten Tomatoes, the film has an approval rating of 87% based on 191 reviews, with an average rating of 6.8/10. The site's critical consensus reads, "Chef's charming cast and sharp, funny script add enough spice to make this feel-good comedy a flavorful—if familiar—treat." Metacritic gave the film a score of 68 out of 100, based on 36 critics, indicating "generally favorable" reviews.

Rolling Stone's Peter Travers gave the film 3.5 out of 4 stars, describing it as "an artful surprise and an exuberant gift" and "deliciously entertaining, comic, touching and often bitingly true". Ty Burr of The Boston Globe also awarded the film 3.5 out of 4 stars; he thought it was "funny and heartfelt" and that, despite its weaknesses, the strengths "overpower the parts of the meal that are undercooked". Chicago Sun-Times critic Richard Roeper gave Chef 3 out of 4 stars, finding it "funny, quirky and insightful, with a bounty of interesting supporting characters" but also noting the lack of plot and character development in some parts. Gary Goldstein of the Los Angeles Times gave particular praise to the "terrific supporting cast" and the script's lack of cliché, such as in its presentation of family dynamics.

Joe Leydon from Variety found the film's plot predictable and slow-paced, but noted "the trip itself is never less than pleasant, and often extremely funny". The New York Times' Stephen Holden described Chef as "aggressively feel-good" and "shallow but enjoyable". Michael O'Sullivan of The Washington Post gave the film 3.5 out of 4 stars and found it "deeply satisfying, down to the soul", praising the "incredible" food photography, the "colorful supporting cast" and the "wryly observant" humor, raving, "There's nothing terribly profound about "Chef". But its message‍—‌that relationships, like cooking, take a hands-on approach‍—‌is a sweet and sustaining one." SFGate film critic Mick LaSalle opined that Chef was Favreau's best film to date, highlighting the "natural and convincing" chemistry between Favreau and Anthony and the "vivid" scenes featuring big-name actors in small roles.

USA Today's Scott Bowles gave Chef 3.5 out of 4 stars and called it "a nuanced side dish, a slow-cooked film that's one of the most heartwarming of the young year". Ken Choy of Wide Lantern noted the structural problems but admitted, "If you ever saw the Kristen Bell sloth video on Ellen, that was me during the entire 2nd half of the movie. Non-stop tears. It was happy-crying because Favreau's character was doing what he wanted."

Slant Magazine critic Chris Cabin, gave Chef a 1.5 out of 4 stars and described it as Favreau's "most self-satisfied, safe, and compromised film to date", chiefly criticizing the film's lack of realism and credibility. Writing for The Village Voice, Amy Nicholson agreed that the storyline was implausible and summarized the film as "so charmingly middlebrow that it's exactly the cinematic comfort food it mocks". Indiewire's Eric Kohn opined that with Chef, "Favreau has no sweeping thematic aims", and that the end product was a "self-indulgent vanity project".

== Television series ==
In 2019, Favreau and Choi released a documentary television spin-off on Netflix, The Chef Show, that sees Jon Favreau and Roy Choi, "experiment with their favorite recipes and techniques, baking, cooking, exploring and collaborating with some bold-face names in the entertainment and culinary world". A second season was released in 2020.

== Remake ==
In 2017, the film was remade into an Indian Hindi comedy-drama, also titled Chef, by Raja Krishna Menon, featuring Saif Ali Khan and Padmapriya Janakiraman in the lead roles.
