= Brian Duffy (chef) =

American chef

Brian Duffy is an American chef known for numerous television appearances on the TV series Bar Rescue.

== Biography ==
As a chef, Duffy tours the United States, occasionally riding his Harley-Davidson, helping and revamping struggling bars and restaurants along the way. Kicking off his television career on the Food Network series Date Plate, Duffy has also been featured on the DIY Network, HGTV, NBC, and Fine Living Network. He has served as a judge on the Food Network series Beat Bobby Flay and has appeared on The Today Show since 2006 for the Saint Patrick's Day Irish cook-off.

Duffy developed his signature spice line along with T-shirts, kitchen aprons, hats, and hand soaps specifically fitting the needs of chefs. In 2017, he was initiated into the Tau Kappa Epsilon fraternity.

In 2016, he opened a restaurant in partnership with a local brewing company in the Brewerytown neighborhood in Philadelphia.
