= Skylight Inn BBQ =

- Interactive map of Skylight Inn BBQ

Restaurant information
- Established: July 8, 1947
- Owner: Jones family
- Food type: Eastern North Carolina barbecue
- Location: 4618 S Lee St., Ayden, North Carolina
- Coordinates: 35°27′40″N 77°25′24″W

Skylight Inn BBQ is a barbecue restaurant in Ayden, North Carolina. Founded by Pete Jones in 1947, it specializes in whole hog barbecue.

== Description ==
The restaurant is a brick building with a metal roof. The roof is topped by a wood and aluminum replica of the United States Capitol. The Capitol replica was added to the restaurant in 1984, after a 1979 article in National Geographic declared the restaurant "the barbecue capital of the world". Outside of the restaurant is a wooden billboard with a portrait of the restaurant's founder Pete Jones and the four tenets of the restaurant. The tenets are that the restaurant is the barbecue capital of the world, that the men of the Jones family are its founders and statesmen, that they uphold a tradition dating to 1830, and that barbecue must be cooked with wood.

=== Menu ===
The restaurant specializes in Eastern North Carolina style whole hog barbecue. The majority of its hogs are purchased from meat processors in Ayden. Unlike many restaurants, the Skylight Inn smokes its hogs with heads still attached. The meat is dressed with vinegar, salt, pepper, and Texas Pete hot sauce. The restaurant is known for smoking its meat over charcoals made by burning wood logs in nearby fireplaces. It uses hickory and oak wood for cooking. The restaurant uses a vinegar-based barbecue sauce. The smoked hog is chopped into pulled pork. The pork mixture includes tenderloin, inner meat, and crisped skin, which adds a crunchy texture.

The pork is served as a barbecue sandwich on a white bread roll or as a tray with sides such as coleslaw and cornbread. The only type of bread served by the restaurant as a side is cornbread, made with stone-ground cornmeal, water and pork drippings. The cornbread is known for being denser and chewier than traditional cornbread. It also serves barbecue chicken.

== History ==
The restaurant was opened on July 8, 1947 by eighteen year-old Pete Jones. The restaurant was often colloquially called "Pete Jones' Barbecue" by locals. Jones built the restaurant while working for his uncle Emmitt Dennis at the City Cafe where he prepared whole hog barbecue. Jones offered beer and a jukebox to help the restaurant stand out from other barbecue restaurants in Ayden at the time. It was open late into the night and became popular with couples and rowdy crowds. At one point, Jones considered building an adjoining dance hall before changing his mind. The restaurant stopped being a late night establishment after the town introduced a 7 pm curfew to stop local unrest.

In 2003, the restaurant received a James Beard American Classic Award. Pete Jones died in 2006. The restaurant is owned by the Jones family.
