= Ogguere =

- Origin: Havana, Cuba
- Genres: Hip hop, reggaeton
- Years active: 1988–present

Ogguere is a Cuban music group founded in 2001. Edrey Riveri (director, creator) and member of the group chose Ogguere, a Yoruba word that means "soul of the earth", as a symbolic name. Their song "Cha Cuba" was recorded in 2001.

== History ==
Edrey and Ulises first met in the Santos Suárez neighbourhood of Havana, where Edrey lived (and still lives). Ulises grew up in El Cotorro, the site of the old Modelo Brewery.

In 1996 Edrey and Ulises started working with Pablo Herrera, Cuba's premier rap producer, who also happened to live in Santos Suarez, on Calle Zapote. Deciding to disregard the lucrative reggaeton niche, Edrey’s idea was to use all the Cuban rhythms and create a fusion of Mambo, Son, Chachacha and mix them with funkier sounds, like the rumba.

"Cha Cuba" was recorded in 2001 with Orquesta Aragón, a traditional famous charanga band.

Ogguere was fast on the way to success and recognition when they recorded the track "Como Esta El Yogourt" (How's the yogourt?), which video clip was directed by prominent Cuban artist Alexandre Arrechea.

They recorded their first album, Llena de Amor El Mambo, which features contributions from legendary Cuban musicians such as Mayra Caridad Valdés, Aideè Milanés, Roberto Hernandez aka Robertòn(from Orquesta Los Van Van), Yulien Oviedo, Diana Fuentes, Oscar Valdèz, etc. This record got the recognition from Cuban Award Academy “Cubadisco” in 2008, winning Rap-Fusion album of the year.

== Discography ==
Llena de Amor El Mambo

Solar

Raices
