= Art Smith (chef) =

American chef (born 1960)

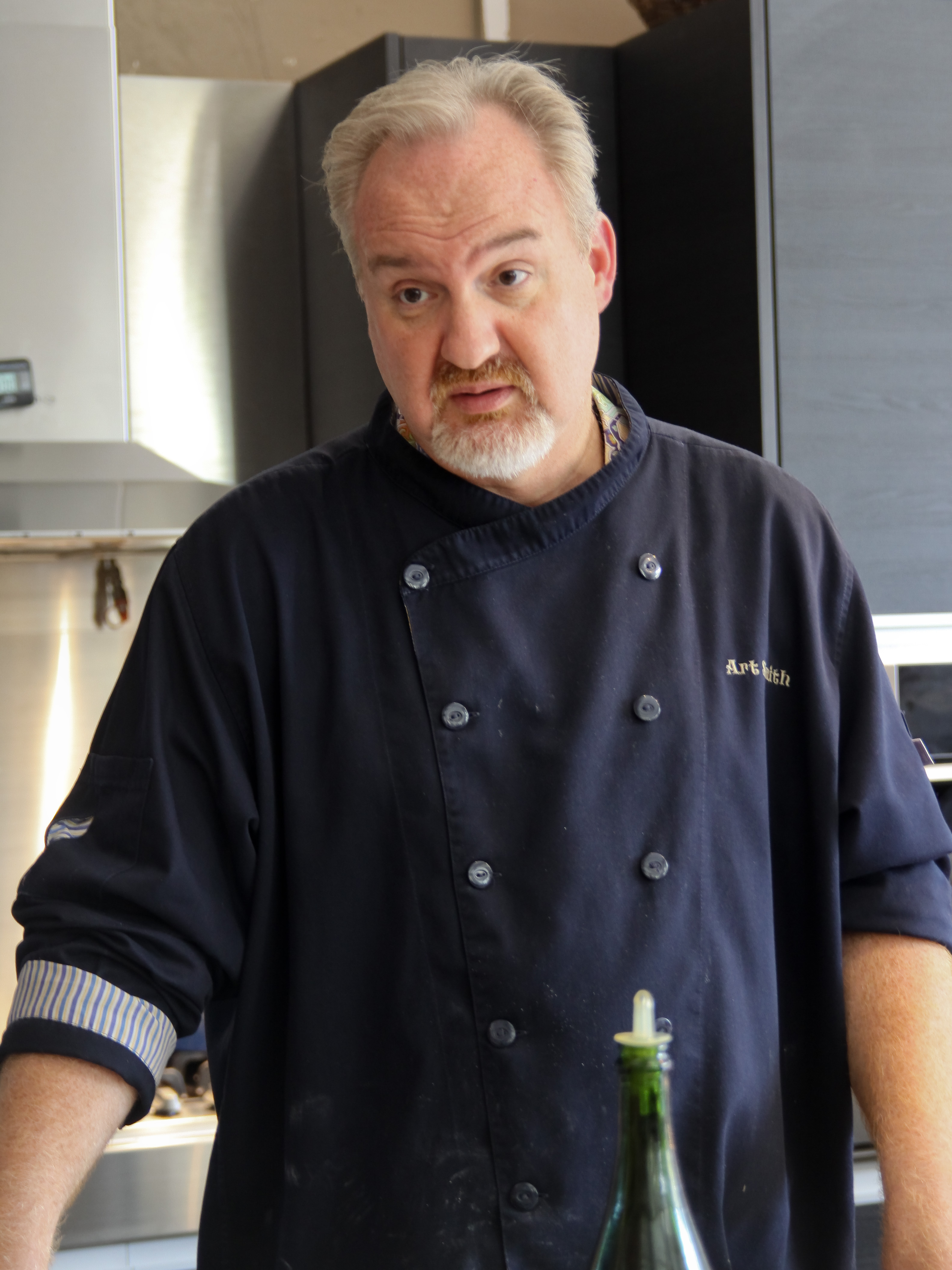
- Art Smith in 2009
- Born: March 1, 1960 (age 66); Jasper, Florida, United States
- Education: Florida State University
- Culinary career
- Cooking style: Southern cuisine
- Current restaurants
- Blue Door in Chicago, Illinois Art Smith's Réunion in Chicago, Illinois; Chicago Q in Chicago, Illinois; Art and Soul in Washington, D.C. Southern Art and Bourbon Bar (CLOSED) in Atlanta, Georgia; Homecoming: Florida Kitchen and Shine Bar The Landing - Disney Springs, Lake Buena Vista, Florida
- Previous restaurant
- American European Express (transcontinental train)
- Television shows
- The Oprah Winfrey Show; Iron Chef America; BBQ Pitmasters; Chopped All Stars
- Website: www.chefartsmith.net

Charles Arthur Smith (born March 1, 1960) is an American chef who has worked for former Florida governors Bob Graham and Jeb Bush and until 2007 was personal chef to Oprah Winfrey. His expertise is Southern cuisine.

While attending Florida State University, he completed culinary internships with The Greenbrier and the Walt Disney Magic Kingdom College Program.

== Publications ==
Smith has written three cookbooks: Back to the Table; Kitchen Life: Real Food for Real Families; and Back to the Family. He contributed recipes and cooking advice to The Spectrum, the newest book by cardiologist and New York Times bestselling author Dean Ornish. He edits a monthly article on Oprah.com and contributes articles to O, The Oprah Magazine. His latest cookbook is Art Smith's Healthy Comfort (published by Harper One 2013).

== Projects ==
=== Common Threads ===
Smith founded the non-profit charity Common Threads, which is focused on community health through food and nutrition. The nonprofit provides cooking and nutrition classes, along with a curriculum that aims to teach community educators how to create healthy, culturally accessible and inexpensive meals.

He is on the board of directors of “Kids Café”, a nutrition program for children in Minneapolis. Smith owns and runs a restaurant in Chicago called TABLE fifty-two as well as Art and Soul in Washington, D.C. In 2009, Smith raised $10,000 for Common Threads as a participant on the television show Top Chef Masters, Season-1.

== Events ==
Smith has cooked for former President Barack Obama and Carl XVI Gustaf of Sweden. In addition to being chef for Florida Governor Bob Graham, he cooked for Florida Governor Jeb Bush, Romero Britto, film stars Ali Landry and Eduardo Verástegui amongst many others. He has also appeared on Extreme Makeover: Home Edition. Smith also appeared in a cooking segment in Lady Gaga's 2011 ABC special A Very Gaga Thanksgiving in which he and Gaga prepared a Thanksgiving meal of turkey and waffles. Months later, Smith became the head chef of Joanne Trattoria, an Italian restaurant in New York City owned by Lady Gaga's parents.

== Awards ==
- The 2002 James Beard Award for Back to the Table: The Reunion of Food and Family.
- 2001 Gourmand World Cookbook Award - Category, “For Human Values.”
- Humanitarian of the Year, 2007, James Beard Foundation
- In 2008 Art Smith was inducted into the Chicago Gay and Lesbian Hall of Fame.

== Personal ==
Smith lives in Jasper, Florida with his husband, Jesus Salgueiro, a painter. The two married at the Lincoln Memorial in 2011, after being together 10 years. They donate their time to many causes, from children's cooking classes to humanitarian aid. He and his husband have adopted five children.
