= Johnny Trigg =

American chef (born 1938)

- Born: 1938 (age 87–88); Alvarado, Texas, U.S.
- Culinary career
- Cooking style: Barbecue
- Television show: BBQ Pitmasters
- Awards won: Two-time Jack Daniel's World Championship BBQ Invitational grand champion; Season 3 BBQ Pitmasters grand championship

Johnny Trigg (born 1938) from Alvarado, Texas, is an American celebrity chef and competitor on the competitive barbecue circuit. He is a two-time grand champion of the Jack Daniels World Championship Invitational and has appeared on TLC reality television show BBQ Pitmasters.

== Career ==
Johnny graduated from Cisco High School in Cisco, Texas, and afterwards went to the University of North Texas. Trigg worked for Fireman's Fund Insurance Company in San Francisco as an insurance executive, and retired in December 1996. He was introduced to BBQ while at the insurance company after he was impressed by a fellow executive's briskets; he bought his first trailer BBQ in 1984. After attending a competitive BBQ event in 1989, he entered his first BBQ event in 1990 in Denton, Texas, and jokes that BBQ is his "golf game". After entering contests in his home state of Texas, he began competing at Kansas City Barbeque Society events in 1999 as the prize money was better. He annually enters around 45 contests each year, spending between 225 and 230 days each year on the road.

His BBQ team is called "Smoking Triggers", and he has been nicknamed the "Godfather of BBQ" and has also been called "the New England Patriots of barbecuing". He has twice been named the Grand Champion of the Jack Daniel's World Championship BBQ Invitational in Lynchburg, Tennessee, in 2000 and 2003. It was the first occasion any competitor had won the competition more than once. The event is considered to be the most prestigious championship in competitive BBQ.

He appeared in the first two series of TLC reality television show BBQ Pitmasters. He was one of four chefs who travelled to Kuwait to feed the US troops stationed there, cooking over 100 briskets at each station. In 2012, he was inducted into the Barbecue Hall of Fame by the American Royal Association. Johnny came back to cook in season three of BBQ Pitmasters. He not only placed first in the turkey and pork belly competition, but advanced onto the finale and became overall grand champion and won the title of BBQ Pitmaster.
