= Elko, Georgia =

- Unincorporated community
- Location within Georgia Location within the United States
- Coordinates: 32°19′52″N 83°42′23″W
- Country: United States
- State: Georgia
- County: Houston

Elko is an unincorporated community in Houston County, Georgia, United States, south of the city of Perry. Founded circa 1890 as a railroad town, Elko prospered in the early 1900s as a local depot and trading center for cotton planters in southern Houston County.

== History ==
The district around Elko, called the Old Thirteenth Georgia Military District, had been devoted mainly to cotton farming since Houston County was established in the 1820s. The Norfolk loamy sand soil which underlies the settlement and most of its surrounding area is considered to be some of the best agricultural land in Houston County. By spring 1888 the Georgia Southern and Florida Railroad (or GS&F) completed a line through Houston County. In the southern part of the county, the railroad passed near two older farm communities called Hickory Grove and Spoonville. The GS&F Railroad sold land lots for a new town with a railroad depot. The community was first called "Elko" in 1889. The town of Elko was incorporated in 1891 with an elected mayor-council government.

The railroad depot was the center of business and social life in Elko, and crowds greeted the daily trains that ran from Macon, Georgia through Valdosta, Georgia to Palatka, Florida. Regular passenger service began in March 1890. The line was acquired by the Southern Railway in 1895. Because of the railroad, Elko residents could go shopping in Macon and return home the same evening. They could also travel overnight to Florida and visit the resorts at St. Augustine.

In 1900 the town's population was estimated at 500. A newspaper, The Elkonian, appeared in 1899. The Bank of Elko was founded in 1900.

=== Decline ===
The boll weevil blight had a devastating effect on the town's commerce. The Bank of Elko soon liquidated its assets and closed, followed by many other businesses in Elko. Local farmers switched to peach crops, and Elko citizens built a peach packing shed, but the town never recovered its former prosperity. In 1915 or afterward, a fire caused by cinders from a locomotive smokestack burned down Elko's remaining stores. Scheduled passenger service to Elko ended in 1930.

The town's last mayor was Joe Norton "Nick" Buff. In the latter half of the twentieth century only Paul Davis' general store, which doubled as the town's post office, remained open in Elko.

== Origin of the name ==
The origin of the name "Elko" is unknown, but it is believed to have been bestowed by the GS&F railroad company in 1889. Other railroad towns named "Elko" exist in the American states of Nevada and South Carolina.

== Present-day Elko ==
With the demise of railroad passenger service, Elko became more isolated in the latter half of the twentieth century than it had been in the 1890s, and the population declined. Elko's residential district, with its Victorian houses shaded by oak and pecan trees, attracts some residents who commute to nearby cities. As an unincorporated community, Elko is governed by the Houston County Board of Commissioners and protected by county sheriff's patrols and a fire department staffed partly by volunteers. The town's churches hold either weekly or monthly services, with some residents attending a different church on successive Sundays.
