= Jason Dady =

American chef and restaurateur

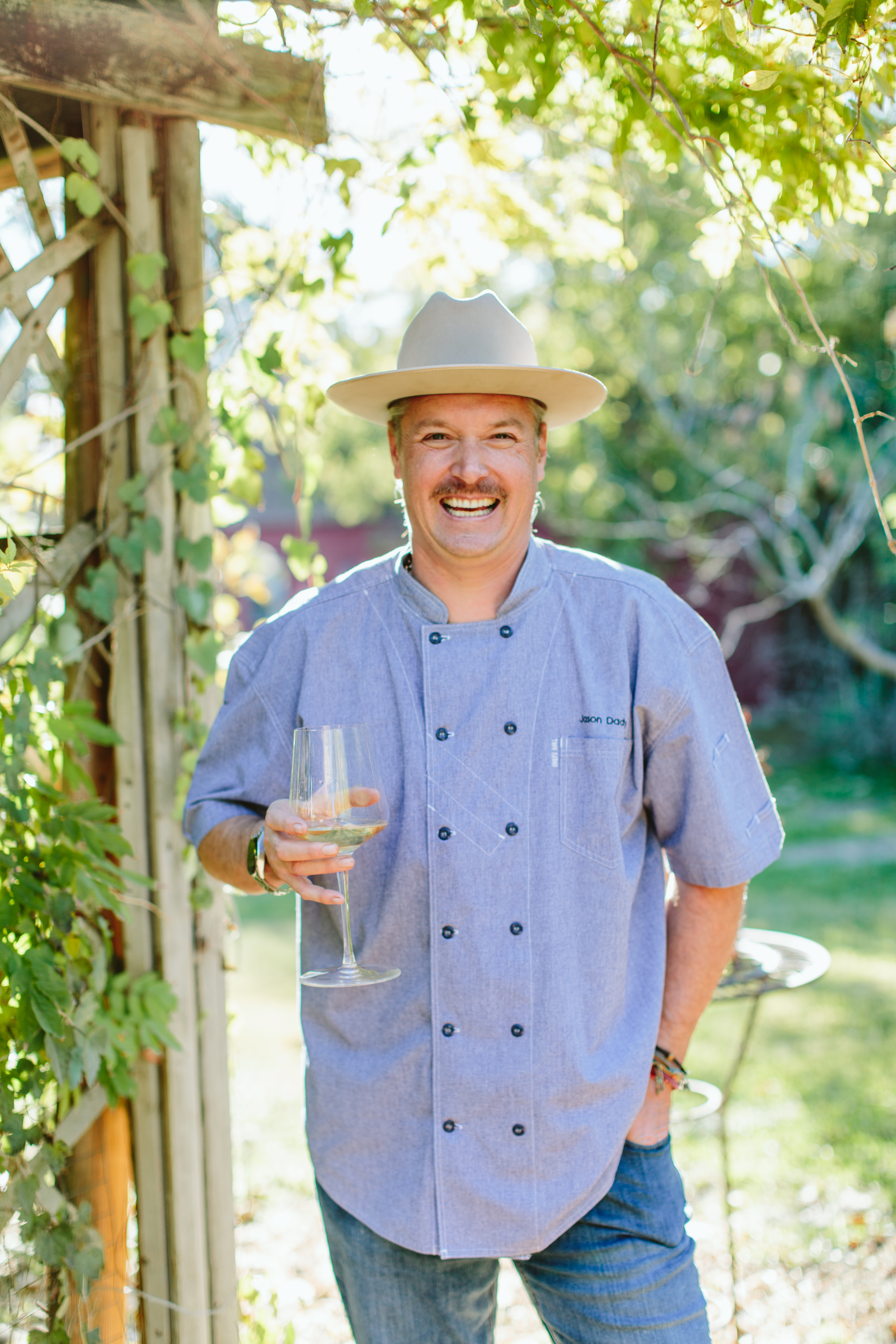
- Dady in 2023
- Born: 1976 (age 49–50); Kearney, Nebraska
- Education: Texas Tech University; California Culinary Academy
- Occupations: Chef; Restaurateur; Entrepreneur
- Television: BBQ Brawl; Iron Chef Gauntlet; Beat Bobby Flay
- Website: jasondady.com

Jason Dady is an American chef, restaurateur, and entrepreneur. He is known for his appearances on television cooking shows, including “BBQ Brawl”, "Iron Chef Gauntlet", and "Beat Bobby Flay" on Food Network. He is the founder of Tre Trattoria, Lodge Restaurant, Bin 555 Restaurant & Wine Bar, Two Bros. BBQ Market and most recently, Mexico Ceaty.

== Early life ==
Dady earned his B.A in Restaurant, Hotel and Institutional Management at Texas Tech University. He then attended California Culinary Academy and worked for Stars and Beringer Wine Estates.

== Culinary career ==
In 2001, Dady, along with his brother Jake Dady and wife Crystal Dady, launched The Lodge Restaurant of Castle Hills. The restaurant was open for 10 years before closing at the end of 2011.

In 2007, he opened Tre Trattoria on Broadway Street in San Antonio, before closing on 31 May 2018 and reopening again at the San Antonio Museum of Art in 9 June of the same year.

Other notable restaurants include BIN 555 Restaurant & Wine Bar in 2006 (closed in early 2014), Two Bros BBQ Market and sister restaurant, Alamo BBQ Co. in 2008 and 2018 respectively, Shuck Shack in 2015, Range in 2017, Chispas in February 2019, Jardin in 2020 (located on the San Antonio Botanical Garden), and Roca & Martillo.

In 2024, Mexico Ceaty was announced by Dady as a new tex-mex restaurant he was opening. The 20,000 feet (6,100 m) restaurant was finally opened on 20 April 2026.

== Awards and recognition ==
Awards and recognition received by Jason Dady
Award	Organization	Year
Rising Star	Restaurant Hospitality Magazine	2004
40 Under 40 Rising Star	San Antonio Business Journal	2008
Best Chef in San Antonio	San Antonio Current	2013
Best Chef in San Antonio	San Antonio Magazine	2018
Best Culinary Ambassador	San Antonio Magazine	2021
Chef of the Year	San Antonio Culture Map	2022
