= Franklin Barbecue =

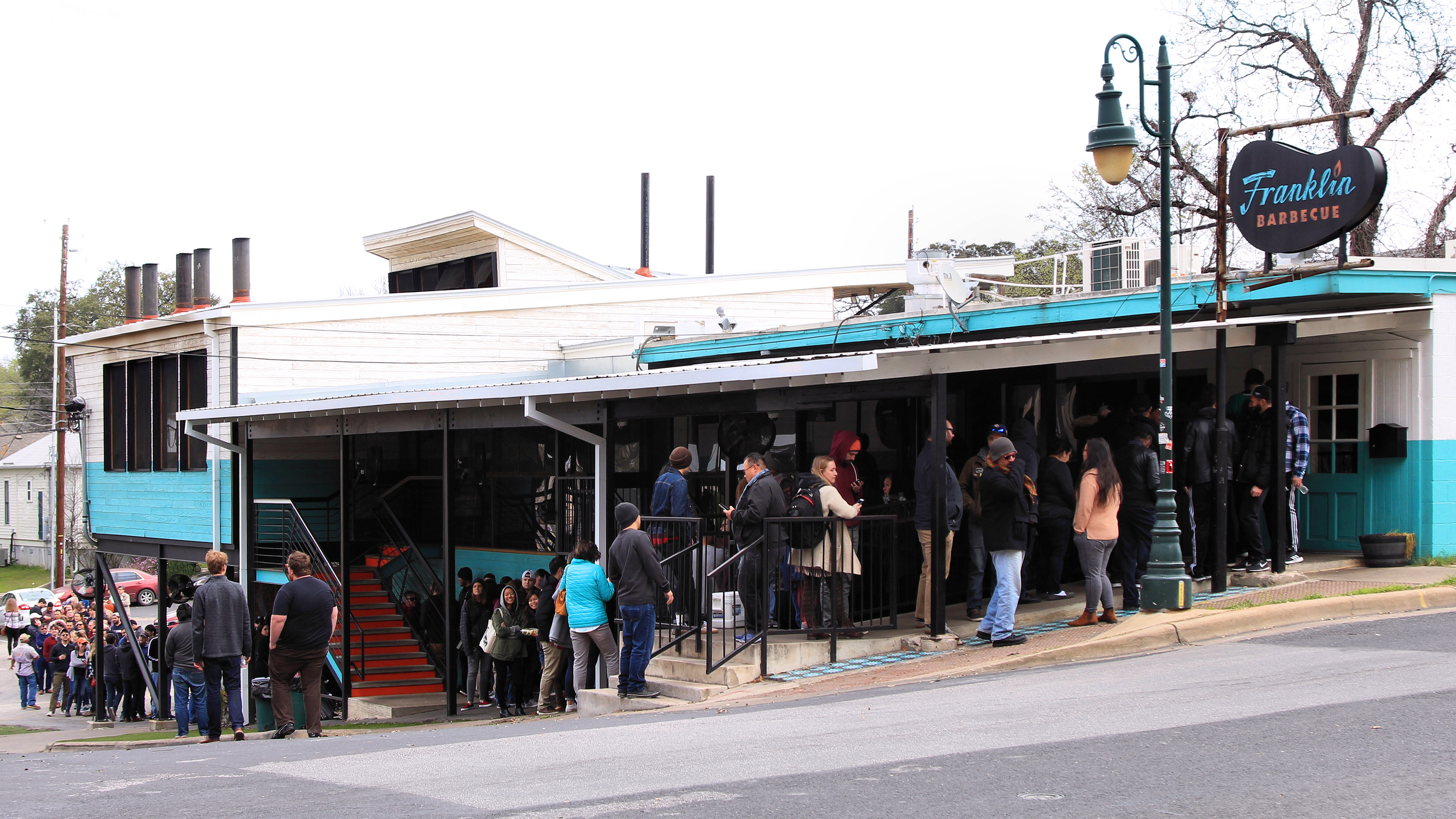
- Customers waiting in line outside Franklin Barbecue in 2019
- Interactive map of Franklin Barbecue

Restaurant information
- Established: 2009; 17 years ago
- Owners: Aaron and Stacy Franklin
- Food type: Barbecue
- Dress code: Casual
- Location: 900 E 11th St., Austin, Texas, 78702
- Coordinates: 30.270079°N 97.731312°W
- Website: franklinbarbecue.com

Franklin Barbecue is a barbecue restaurant located in Austin, Texas, founded in 2009 by Aaron Franklin. The restaurant has sold out of brisket every day since its establishment and has attracted a national following.

== History ==
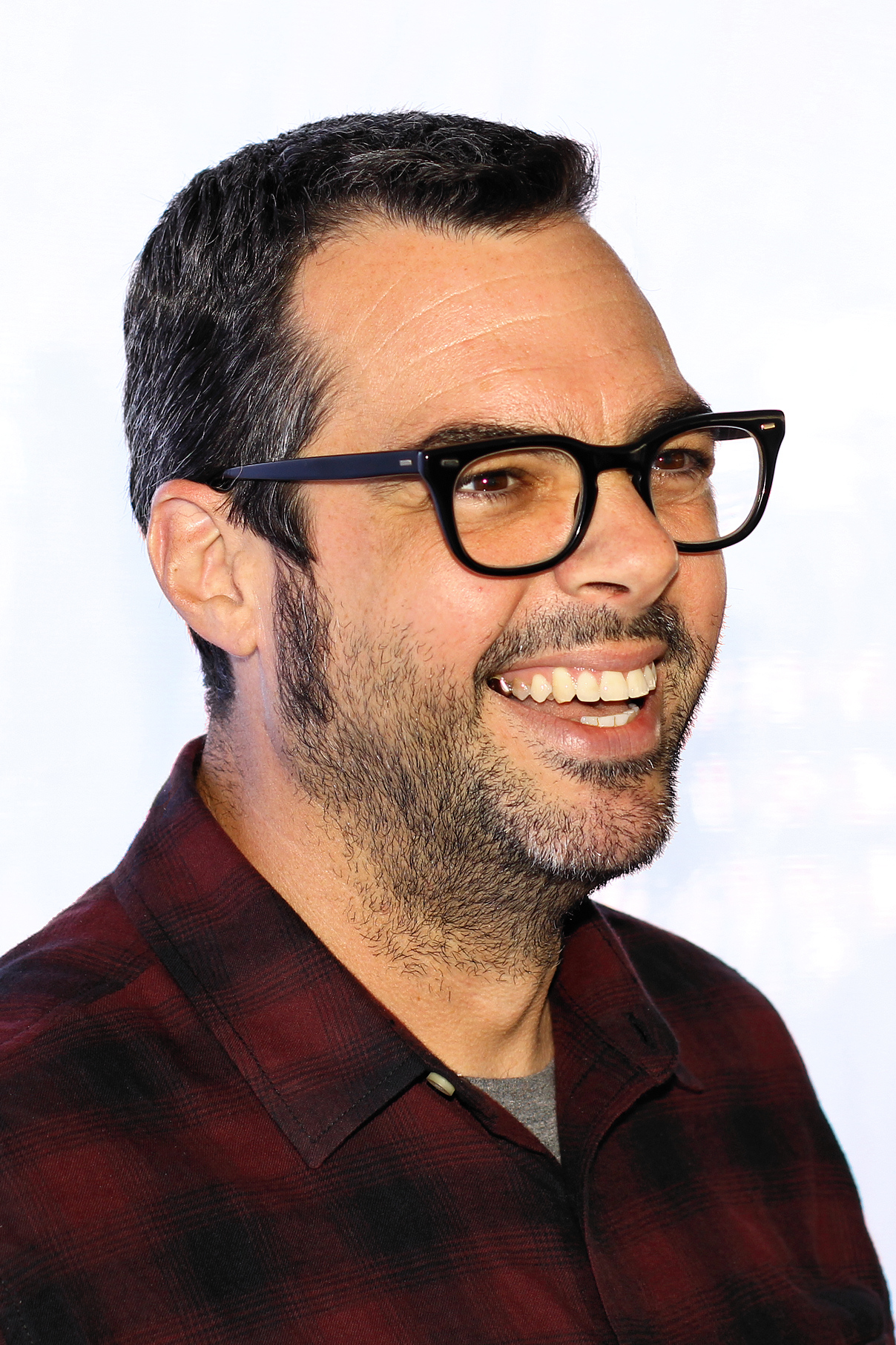
Aaron Franklin

In 2009, Aaron Franklin launched the restaurant in a trailer. Franklin Barbecue moved to a brick and mortar location in 2011. The building's color scheme matched Franklin's original trailer.

The restaurant appeared on Anthony Bourdain: No Reservations in September 2012. In July 2014, President Barack Obama visited the restaurant and bought lunch for those in line behind him.

The restaurant featured prominently in a scene in Jon Favreau's 2014 film Chef. Aaron Franklin and general manager Benji Jacob had speaking cameos.

=== Fire and reopening ===
In the early morning of August 26, 2017, a fire broke out in the smokehouse section of the Austin eatery and did significant damage to portions of the outer building. The main restaurant area suffered only smoke damage. The restaurant would close for three months before returning as a smaller operation in November 2017. By March 2018, the smokehouse had been redesigned and rebuilt.

== Food ==
Franklin Barbecue has been credited with leading the new-traditionalist barbecue movement. Their menu consists of pulled pork, pork ribs, sausages, turkey and brisket. For his Texas style brisket, Franklin uses post oak wood and Meyer Angus beef which is seasoned with salt and pepper.

== Awards and honors ==
In Bon Appetit's July 2011 issue, editor Andrew Knowlton called Franklin Barbecue "the best BBQ in the country." In May 2015, Franklin Barbecue owner Aaron Franklin was awarded a James Beard Foundation Award for Best Chef: Southwest. He is the first chef who specializes in barbecue to be nominated, or receive, the award. In 2013, Franklin Barbecue was ranked first in Texas Monthly's "The 50 Best BBQ Joints" and was featured on the list again in 2017. In 2020 Aaron Franklin was inducted into the American Royal Barbecue Hall of Fame.

== Notable patrons ==
Notable patrons include Barack Obama, David Chang, Anthony Bourdain, Gordon Ramsay, Jon Favreau, and Jimmy Kimmel.

== BBQ with Franklin ==
In 2013, Austin PBS station KLRU worked with Aaron Franklin to produce a web series, BBQ with Franklin, on barbecue. This show appears on the Create TV network which is part of the PBS family.

=== Web episodes ===
Episode	Date	Title	Length	Description
1	June 5, 2013	The Brisket	09:19	Aaron discusses what to look for when choosing a brisket, how to trim it and his method of seasoning.
2	June 5, 2013	Ribs - Part 1	10:04	Aaron discusses pork spare ribs, how to trim and season them.
3	June 5, 2013	Ribs - Part 2	06:58	After seasoning the ribs, Aaron walks viewers through cooking them via an offset smoker.
4	July 31, 2013	The Smoker	06:12	Aaron walks viewers through modifying and season a common style offset smoker, available at everyday home improvement and sporting good stores.
5	July 31, 2013	The Payoff	13:00	Aaron discusses when and why to wrap a brisket, what to look for during the cooking process, and how to tell when the brisket is done. Finally, Aaron walks viewers through properly slicing and serving of brisket.
6	July 31, 2013	The Cook	07:05	Aaron talks about fire management, wood selection, and how to achieve optimum cooking temperatures during the lengthy cook.
7	Aug 14, 2013	The Wood	04:55	Aaron describes characteristics and wood strategies for your optimal smoke
8	Aug 29, 2013	Thanksgiving Part 1	07:59	Learn how to brine and smoke a turkey with Aaron Franklin.
9	Nov 21, 2013	Thanksgiving Part 2	11:33	Stacy Franklin shares recipes that go perfectly with a smoked turkey such as smoked garlic mashed potatoes and a grilled green bean shishito pepper side dish. Aaron explains how to tell when the turkey is getting done and what to do in the last hour of smoking.
10	Nov 21, 2013	Thanksgiving Part 3	5:00	Special - How to tell when your turkey is finished plus make a beautiful gravy with smoked butter
11	Nov 21, 2013	Pulled Pork	10:30	Aaron shares the secrets of TEXAS-style pulled pork - what to look for in the cut of meat, how to season and how to cook

=== TV episodes ===
Episode	Date	Title	Length	Description
1	May 21, 2015	Brisket	26:40	Learn how the brisket became a popular centerpiece of Central Texas BBQ. Hear from legends of Texas BBQ and be guided through a step-by-step brisket cook experiment using three different methods.
2	May 28, 2015	Sausage	24:56	Sausage, often a BBQ afterthought, is now finding reason to take center plate. Aaron makes sausage from scratch and visits some folks who are pushing the boundaries of artisan sausage-making.
3	June 4, 2015	Whole Hog	24:56	Learn the steps that go into a whole hog cook from beginning to end. Aaron walks us through the process of building a cinder block pit, learns about pig breeds and throws a party in his backyard.
4	June 11, 2015	The Pits	24:15	Aaron takes a deep-dive into the realm of BBQ pits, as personal as they are functional. Explore different types of smokers from those at the roots of Texas BBQ to the kinds bought in stores. Aaron builds a smoker out of a 250-gallon propane tank.
5	June 18, 2015	Fire & Smoke	24:13	When you're cooking with fire, you'd better have good wood. Aaron covers the major types of wood used in Texas BBQ, gives some tips on building a fire, and shows a twist on using smoke for more than cooking meat.
6	June 25, 2015	Poultry & Sauce	24:56	Aaron takes us to a Texas BBQ joint where they cook their chicken in a unique way and then teaches us how to make sauce from scratch. Meanwhile, John Markus takes us on a whirlwind tour of the regional sauces of America.
7	July 2, 2015	Direct Heat & Mesquite	24:57	Aaron gets a lesson in cooking "cowboy style", in a way that combines traditional BBQ skills with the grill. Then go behind the scenes at a big city BBQ joint in Dallas and learn their unique take on Texas traditions.
8	July 9, 2015	Competition	24:18	Aaron travels to a BBQ cook-off competition in Kansas with his father-in-law, going way outside his comfort zone.
9	July 16, 2015	Pickin' Beef	24:21	Aaron tours Texas to research and then cook some beef ribs. After a butchering and anatomy class in College Station, Texas, he receives some tips from a legendary Central Texas BBQ family.
10	July 23, 2015	Leftovers	24:15	Aaron sends out a little leftover brisket to some chefs around Austin to see how they are inspired by brisket. We end with a taste test that turns into a party.

== See also ==
- List of barbecue restaurants
- List of restaurants in Austin, Texas
- List of Michelin Bib Gourmand restaurants in the United States
