= Beat Bobby Flay =

American television series

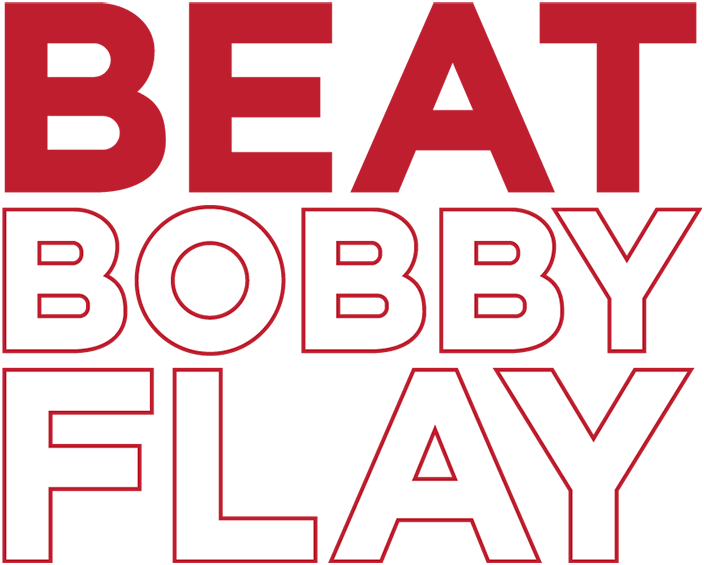
- Genre: Cooking
- Starring: Bobby Flay
- Judges: Various
- Country of origin: United States
- Original language: English
- No. of seasons: 42
- No. of episodes: 528

Production
- Producer: Rock Shrimp Productions

Original release
- Network: Food Network
- Release: August 24, 2013 – present

Beat Bobby Flay is an American cooking competition show on the Food Network. It features various chefs competing against Bobby Flay. The show is taped in front of a live audience.

== Format ==
In the first round, two guests, often a celebrity chef and a friend of Flay, introduce two contestants who cook for 20 minutes against each other using an ingredient chosen by Flay. The guests then determine who cooked the better dish and will face Flay in the second round. The winning contestant then chooses a dish for both the contestant and Flay to cook in the second round which lasts for 45 minutes. The winner of the second round is determined by three judges in a blind taste test. Through 528 competitions, Bobby Flay's record for the show is 330–198, a win percentage of 62.5%.

The presentation of Beat Bobby Flay borrows from boxing matches, with a bell rung to indicate the start of rounds and mild or humorous trash talking by Flay, competing chefs and guest judges. During both rounds, the celebrity judges will periodically walk into the cooking area to talk to each chef about their strategy; in the second round, they will also make light-hearted attempts to distract Flay. At the end of each episode, if the contestant wins, then they get to tell everyone that they Beat Bobby Flay. If Bobby wins, he makes a felicitous joke as he runs off the set.

== Episodes ==
=== Season 1 ===
No.	#	Title	Original airdate	First round			Second round		
No.	#	Title	Original airdate	Guest(s)	Ingredient(s)	Contestants	Judges	Dish	Winner
1	1	"Grueneberg and Nunziata"	August 24, 2013	Alex Guarnaschelli, Jeff Mauro	zucchini	Sarah Grueneberg, Alberico Nunziata	Billy Grant, Marissa May, Lauren DeMaio	chicken parm	Sarah Grueneberg
2	2	"Welcome to New York!"	March 3, 2014	Sunny Anderson, Jonathan Waxman	skirt steak	Anthony Lamas, Jennifer Nguyen	Cobi Levy, Kelsey Nixon, Roberto Treviño	shrimp and grits	Bobby Flay
3	3	"Farmer and the Belle"	March 6, 2014	Michael Symon, Simon Majumdar	red prawn	Karen Akunowicz, Matthew Raiford	Corby Kummer, Melba Wilson, Harold Dieterle	chicken and waffles	Bobby Flay
4	4	"Old Dog, New Tricks"	March 13, 2014	Alex Guarnaschelli, Anne Burrell	cauliflower	Adam Harvey, Brian Tsao	Michael Chernow, Daniel Holzman, Wylie Dufresne	meat tacos	Brian Tsao
5	5	"Fighting Irish"	March 20, 2014	Giada De Laurentiis, Mo Rocca	scallops	Brian Young, Steven McHugh	Ed Levine, Madison Cowan, Nils Norén	bangers & mash	Bobby Flay
6	6	"Beauty and the Feast"	March 27, 2014	Eden Grinshpan, Justin Warner	eggplant	Paul Denamiel, Rochelle Bilow	George Mendes, Michele Ragussis, Hugh Mangum	burger	Bobby Flay
7	7	"Eat, Flay, Love"	April 3, 2014	Alex Guarnaschelli, Jack McDavid	brussels sprouts	Kimberly Van Kline, Christopher Lee	Todd Coleman, Marco Canora, Frank Prisinzano	mac & cheese	Bobby Flay
8	8	"Up in Smoke"	April 10, 2014	Ali Wentworth, Michael Symon	poblano chili pepper	Kamal Rose, Shannon Barr	Ed McFarland, Alain Allegretti, Brian Duffy	crab cakes	Bobby Flay
9	9	"Old School/New School"	April 17, 2014	Katie Lee, Scott Conant	pineapple	Andrew Evans, Brooke Mallory	Joey Campenaro, Aliya LeeKong, Seamus Mullen	meatloaf	Bobby Flay

=== Season 2 ===
No.	#	Title	Original airdate	First round			Second round		
No.	#	Title	Original airdate	Guest(s)	Ingredient(s)	Contestants	Judges	Dish	Winner
10	1	"They Must Be Giants"	July 31, 2014	Geoffrey Zakarian, Scott Conant	lamb chops	Bruce Kalman, Andy Saint-Ange	Donatella Arpaia, Ed McFarland, Leah Cohen	linguine & clams	Bobby Flay
11	2	"East vs West"	August 7, 2014	Giada De Laurentiis, Michael Symon	fresh squid	Jason Santos, Neal Fraser	Drew Nieporent, Anita Lo, Harold Dieterle	fried chicken sandwich	Neal Fraser
12	3	"Bring Home the Bacon"	August 14, 2014	Sunny Anderson, Jet Tila	broccoli	Matthew Britt, Tyler Anderson	Wylie Dufresne, Emily Fleischaker, Charlie Palmer	New England clam chowder	Bobby Flay
13	4	"Battle of Brooklyn"	August 21, 2014	Anne Burrell, Chris Santos	arctic char	Jennifer Cole Ruiz, Jordin Andino	Jonathon Sawyer, Roberto Trevino, Andy Ricker	Korean short ribs	Bobby Flay
14	5	"Out of the Pan/Into the Fire"	August 28, 2014	Daphne Oz, Alton Brown	pork chops	Rina Younan, Carlos Serrano	Michael Psilakis, Ivy Stark, Eugene Remm	falafel	Rina Younan
15	6	"Ladies First"	September 4, 2014	Katie Lee, Marc Murphy	oysters	Natasha Pogrebinsky, Esther Choi	Michael Ferraro, Kristin Sollenne, Jeff Zalanick	beef stroganoff	Bobby Flay
16	7	"Risky Business"	September 11, 2014	Ted Allen, Alex Guarnaschelli	ricotta cheese	Jeremiah Bullfrog, Kyle Williams	Michael Psilakis, Joey Campanaro, Joshua David Stein	Cuban sandwich	Bobby Flay
17	8	"Smile Now, Cry Later"	September 18, 2014	Judah Friedlander, Michael Symon	sweet potato	Jason Fullilove, Billy Oliva	Leah Cohen, George Mendes, Dominique Crenn	bouillabaise	Bobby Flay
18	9	"Ruling with an Iron Fist"	September 25, 2014	Simon Majumdar, Donatella Arpaia	beets	Tim Wiechmann, Stephan Durand	April Bloomfield, Scott Gerber, Maureen Petrosky	wienerschnitzel	Tim Wiechmann
19	10	"Against All Odds"	October 2, 2014	Alton Brown, Anne Burrell	corn	Florian Wehrli, Heather West	Terrance Brennan, Maureen Petrosky, Glenn Harris	French toast	Bobby Flay
20	11	"Sun Up to Show Down"	October 9, 2014	Sunny Anderson, Katie Lee	wild king salmon	Mychael Bonner, Anna Maria Santorelli	Harold Moore, Tracy Weiss, Ryan Scott	eggplant Parmesan	Bobby Flay
21	12	"Only in New York"	October 16, 2014	Alex Guarnaschelli, Michael Symon	fresh atlantic cod	Palak Patel, Daniel Holzman	Hugh Mangum, Todd Coleman, Andrew Carmellini	chicken curry	Palak Patel
22	13	"Orange is the New Beat"	October 23, 2014	Geoffrey Zakarian, Jeff Mauro	pumpkin puree	James Gillespie, Rob Mafucci	Frank Prisinzano, Candice Kuman, Lauren Hirschberg	pasta Bolognese	Bobby Flay

=== Season 3 ===
No.	#	Title	Original airdate	First round			Second round		
No.	#	Title	Original airdate	Guest(s)	Ingredient(s)	Contestants	Judges	Dish	Winner
23	1	"An International Affair"	October 30, 2014	Amanda Freitag, Ted Allen	egg	Patrick D'Andrea, Rob Feenie	Mark Birnbaum, Franklin Becker, Andrew Friedman	ravioli	Bobby Flay
24	2	"Surf and Turf"	November 6, 2014	Alex Guarnaschelli, Anne Burrell	green peas	Jake Gandolfo, Rafael Lunetta	Ed Brown, Ken Oringer, Suvir Saran	fish sandwich	Bobby Flay
25	3	"Gobbled Up"	November 13, 2014	Geoffrey Zakarian, Chrissy Teigen	cranberries	Kat Ploszaj, Julietta Ballesteros	Seamus Mullen, Shaun Hergatt, David Leite	duck a l'orange	Bobby Flay
26	4	"Shaken Not Stirred"	November 20, 2014	Giada De Laurentiis, Michael Symon	chorizo	Kristine Kittrell, Giulio Adriani	Frank Prisinzano, Tricia Williams, Brian Duffy	gnocchi	Kristine Kittrell
27	5	"By Land or by Sea"	December 4, 2014	Brooke Burke-Charvet, Alton Brown	marcona almonds	Alex Diaz, Jeremy Hanlon	Seamus Mullen, Lourdes Castro, Madison Cowan	fish and chips	Bobby Flay
28	6	"Bells will be Ringing"	December 11, 2014	Anne Burrell, Scott Conant	pears	Mark Allen, Blythe Beck	Aliya Leekong, Greg and Darin Bresnitz	cornish game hen	Bobby Flay
29	7	"Heat in the Street"	December 18, 2014	Scott Conant, Alex Guarnaschelli	pancetta	Damien O'Donnell, Adrian Leon	Phillip Lee, Ariane Daguin, Ivan Orkin	pork chop	Bobby Flay
30	8	"Roll the Dice"	December 25, 2014	Michael Voltaggio, Simon Majumdar	pork tenderloin	Evan Hennessey, John Miele	Ken Friedman, Ed McFarland, Donald Brophy	lobster roll	John Miele
31	9	"Pot Calling the Kettle Beat"	January 1, 2015	Jonathan Waxman, Aaron Sanchez	goat cheese	Herb Wilson, Robin King	Wylie Dufresne, Anita Lo, Josh Capon	chicken pot pie	Bobby Flay
32	10	"New Kids on the Butcher Block"	January 8, 2015	Jeff Mauro, Justin Warner	ground beef	Malcolm Mitchell, Daniela D'Ambrosio	Joey Campanaro, Madison Cowan, Mike Birnbaum	BLT	Bobby Flay
33	11	"Clash of the Culinary Titans"	January 15, 2015	Sunny Anderson, Ted Allen	pizza dough	Victor Albisu, Eddie Tangredi	Michael Stillman, Ariane Daguin, George Motz	steak and eggs	Victor Albisu
34	12	"Defend the House"	January 29, 2015	Alton Brown, Alex Guarnaschelli	hanger steak	Joe Dobias, Alina Eisenhauer	Sam Talbot, Aliya Leekong, Alex Garcia	biscuits & gravy	Bobby Flay
35	13	"Fry Me a River"	February 5, 2015	Scott Conant, Geoffrey Zakarian	tomatoes	Robert Hesse, Michael Jenkins	Corby Kummer, Terrance Brennon, Drew Nieporent	chicken wings	Bobby Flay

=== Season 4 ===
No.	#	Title	Original airdate	First round			Second round		
No.	#	Title	Original airdate	Guest(s)	Ingredient(s)	Contestants	Judges	Dish	Winner
36	1	"Foreign Relations"	March 5, 2015	Giada De Laurentiis, Michael Symon	porterhouse steak	Taichi Kitamura, David Decastro	Ed Schoenfeld, Kristin Sollenne, Harold Dieterle	pot stickers	Taichi Kitamura
37	2	"Fire in the Hole"	March 12, 2015	Alex Guarnaschelli, Katie Lee	chickpeas	Jen Biesty, Chris Lamphier	George Mendes, Aliya LeeKong, Drew Nieporent	paella	Bobby Flay
38	3	"To Contend and Serve"	March 19, 2015	Anne Burrell, Geoffrey Zakarian	italian sausage	Carla Harris, Noah Schwartz	Ed McFarland, Lourdes Castro, Rick Moonen	catfish po' boy	Bobby Flay
39	4	"Culinary Validation"	March 26, 2015	Scott Conant, Natalie Morales	kielbasa	Joe Adorno, Adam Halberg	Jeff Zalaznick, Kristin Sollenne, Rick Moonen	arroz con pollo	Bobby Flay
40	5	"Raising the Bar"	April 2, 2015	Sunny Anderson, Allison Sweeney	shiitake mushrooms	Kelvin Fernandez, Chris Kobayashi	Ivan Orkin, Roberto Treviño, Ming Tsai	meat arepas	Kelvin Fernandez
41	6	"No Training Wheels"	April 9, 2015	Alex Guarnaschelli, David Burtka	feta cheese	Johnny Zone, Jumoke Jackson	Luke Holden, Mary Sue Milliken, Suvir Saran	fried fish tacos	Johnny Zone
42	7	"Best Laid Plans"	April 16, 2015	Katie Lee, Simon Majumdar	sardines	Clark Frasier, Keri Moser	Donal Brophy, Tricia Williams, Ken Friedman	cedar plank salmon	Bobby Flay
43	8	"East Coast's Finest"	April 23, 2015	Curtis Stone, Michael Symon	mussels	Luke Venner, Antonio Franco	Frank Pellegrino Jr., Laura Vitale, Michael Psilakis	veal milanese	Bobby Flay
44	9	"Out on a Limb"	April 30, 2015	Ted Allen, Tamron Hall	fluke	John Wassil, Katherine Humphus	Harold Moore, Ariane Daguin, Todd Coleman	lamb chops	Bobby Flay
45	10	"Any Given Sunday"	May 7, 2015	Chris Santos, Geoffrey Zakarian	bacon	Kathy Cary, Shanna O'Hea	Michael Ferraro, Susan Ungaro, Terrance Brennan	croque-monsieur	Bobby Flay
46	11	"Homeland"	May 14, 2015	Anne Burrell, Scott Conant	oranges	Thoa Nguyen, Jason Hippen	David Massoni, Anita Lo, Ivan Orkin	bibimbap	Thoa Nguyen
47	12	"Humble Beginnings"	May 21, 2015	Sunny Anderson, Simon Majumdar	fresh mozzarella	Christopher Wall, Eugene Jones	Ed McFarlnd, Alexander Smalls, Frank Prisinzano	étouffée	Bobby Flay
48	13	"Getting Grilled"	May 28, 2015	Michael Symon, Debi Mazar	chicken	Dominic Zumpano, Angelo Sosa	Michael Stillman, Hugh Mangum, Michael Lomonaco	steak and potatoes	Bobby Flay

=== Season 5 ===
No.	#	Title	Original airdate	First round			Second round		
No.	#	Title	Original airdate	Guest(s)	Ingredient(s)	Contestants	Judges	Dish	Winner
49	1	"No Fear"	June 4, 2015	Damaris Phillips, Alex Guarnaschelli	halibut	Will Gilson, Lawrence Males	Roberto Treviño, Lourdes Castro, Hugh Mangum	corn-beef hash	Bobby Flay
50	2	"Who's Your Daddy?"	June 11, 2015	Scott Conant, Haylie Duff	lobster	Sam Marvin, Gregory Torrech	Frank Prisinzano, Roberto Treviño, April Bloomfield	sausage & peppers	Sam Marvin
51	3	"No Formalities"	June 18, 2015	Sunny Anderson, Giada de Laurentiis	littleneck clams	Tre Wilcox, Sarah Acconcia	Andrew Carmellini, Tracy Weiss, Josh Capon	pork roulade	Bobby Flay
52	4	"Mavericks"	June 25, 2015	Daphne Oz, Michael Symon	jumbo lump crab meat	Sylvia Casares, Braden Wages	Ivy Stark, Corby Kummer, Leah Cohen	Thai green curry	Bobby Flay
53	5	"Stars and Stripes"	July 2, 2015	Rachael Ray, Jessica Seinfeld	watermelon	Matt O'Neil, Brian Cartenuto	Glenn Harris, Susan Ungaro, Ken Freidman	burger	Bobby Flay
54	6	"Rollin' Deep"	July 9, 2015	Katie Lee, Geoffrey Zakarian	fennel	Linda Hamel, Kenny Johnson	Charlie Parker, Tracy Weiss, Frankie Pelegrino Jr.	meatballs	Kenny Johnson
55	7	"Worst Case Scenario"	July 16, 2015	Amanda Freitag, Alex Guarnaschelli	hen of the woods mushroom	Kouri Killmeier, Jared Case	Michael Lomonaco, Franklin Becker, Michael Psilakis	bratwurst sandwich	Bobby Flay
56	8	"Rise to the Occasion"	July 23, 2015	Ted Allen, Debi Mazar	apples	Gio Osso, Mike Friedman	Aliya LeeKong, Jeff Zalaznick, Laura Vitale	lasagne	Bobby Flay
57	9	"Do or Die"	July 30, 2015	Scott Conant, Geoffrey Zakarian	pomegranates	Peter Morris, Gregory Webb	Harold Dieterle, Ivy Stark, Jason Birchard	chili relleno	Bobby Flay
58	10	"The Heat is On"	August 6, 2015	Katie Lee, Robert Irvine	rib-eye steak	Jeanie Roland, Becca Richards	Susan Feniger, Ed Brown, Susan Ungaro	mussels frites	Jeanie Roland
59	11	"Sticking to Your Guns"	August 13, 2015	Sunny Anderson, Curtis Stone	russet potatoes	Clark Barlowe, Peter McAndrews	Andrew Carmellini, Madison Cowan, April Bloomfield	liver & onions	Bobby Flay
60	12	"Arrivals and Departures"	August 20, 2015	Donatella Arpaia, Alex Guarnaschelli	swordfish	Michael Walters, Lisa Nakamura	Franklin Becker, Candice Kumai, Madison Cowan	jerk chicken	Michael Walters
61	13	"Culinary Tornado"	August 27, 2015	Anne Burrell, Simon Majumdar	New York strip steak	Miguel Trinidad, Brian Hill	Leah Cohen, Hugh Mangum, Devin Alexander	ribs	Bobby Flay

=== Season 6 ===
No.	#	Title	Original airdate	First round			Second round		
No.	#	Title	Original airdate	Guest(s)	Ingredient(s)	Contestants	Judges	Dish	Winner
62	1	"Unfinished Business"	October 1, 2015	Scott Conant, Jonathan Scott, Drew Scott	cherrystone clams	Angelo Sosa, Blythe Beck	Ivy Stark, Josh Capon, Elizabeth Karmel	pork enchiladas	Bobby Flay
63	2	"Settling the Score"	October 8, 2015	Sunny Anderson, Jeff Mauro	rack of lamb	Jordan Andino, Bruce Kalman	Frank Prisinzano, Laura Vitale, Harold Moore	pasta carbonara	Bruce Kalman
64	3	"Frenemies"	October 15, 2015	Michael Symon, Debi Mazar	portobello mushroom	Natasha Pogrebinsky, Michael Jenkins	Ed McFarland, Tom Birchard, Andrew Friedman	pierogi	Bobby Flay
65	4	"Back with a Vengeance"	October 22, 2015	Daphne Oz, Geoffrey Zakarian	kale	Tre Wilcox, Anthony Lamas	Franklin Becker, Lourdes Castro, Julien Medina	moqueca	Bobby Flay
66	5	"Trick or Sweet"	October 26, 2015	Simon Majumdar, Debi Mazar	coconut	Justin Burke-Samson, Tommy Juliano	Paulette Goto, Johnny Iuzzini, Jennifer Yee	pumpkin trifle	Bobby Flay
67	6	"It's a Family Secret"	November 4, 2015	Anne Burrell, Spike Mendelsohn	flat iron steak	Kiran Verma, Ric Orlando	Jason Birchard, Maneet Chauhan, Madison Cowan	potato latkes	Ric Orlando
68	7	"She's a Lady"	November 11, 2015	Katie Lee, Alex Guarnaschelli	chicken thighs	Giovanna Huyke, Jennifer Bajsel	Roberto Treviño, Aliya LeeKong, Hugh Mangum	shrimp mofongo	Bobby Flay
69	8	"Let's Talk Turkey"	November 18, 2015	Michael Symon, Geoffrey Zakarian	acorn squash	Nick Rabar, Jeff Haskel	Susan Ungaro, Michael Ferraro, Sarah Simmons	turkey sandwich	Bobby Flay
70	9	"Hook, Line and Sinker"	December 2, 2015	Scott Conant, Willie Geist	rainbow trout	Roy Breiman, Vaughn Crenshaw	Ken Friedman, Anita Lo, Glenn Harris	Dutch baby pancake	Roy Breiman
71	10	"Roasting on an Open Fire"	December 9, 2015	Alex Guarnaschelli, Penn Jillette	chestnuts	Ariane Duarte, Adil Fawzi	Michael Lomonaco, Candice Kumai, Phillipe Massoud	filet mignon	Ariane Duarte
72	11	"Poking and Prodding"	December 16, 2015	Katie Lee, Judy Gold	polenta	Alex Stratta, Houman Gohary	Marco Moreira, Maneet Chauhan, Jean-Paul Bourgeouis	lamb shish kebab	Bobby Flay
73	12	"Rules are Meant to be Broken"	January 6, 2016	Ted Allen, Margaret Cho	fresh tuna	Diane DiMeo, Ian Russo	Jason Debriere, Ivy Stark, David Massoni	pork tostado	Bobby Flay
74	13	"Live From the Food Carpet"	January 13, 2016	Rachael Ray, Ross Mathews	bell peppers	Gavin Fine, K.N. Vinod	Frank Prisinzano, Missy Robbins, Suvir Saran	fish curry	Bobby Flay

=== Season 7 ===
No.	#	Title	Original airdate	First round			Second round		
No.	#	Title	Original airdate	Guest(s)	Ingredient(s)	Contestants	Judges	Dish	Winner
75	1	"Strike While the Iron's Hot"	January 20, 2016	Amanda Freitag, Geoffrey Zakarian	peanuts	Steve "Nookie" Postal, Tim Freeman	Kristin Sollenne, Dale Talde, Candice Kumai	pad thai	Tim Freeman
76	2	"A Cut Above"	January 27, 2016	Simon Majumdar, Jet Tila	flank steak	John Tesar, Terry Sargent	Michael Stillman, Madison Cowan, Jean-Paul Bourgeouis	beef Wellington	Bobby Flay
77	3	"Touchdown!"	February 3, 2016	Anne Burrell, Laila Ali	avocado	Zane Holmquist, Deji Oduwole	Ben Ford, Tricia Williams, Pete Levin	pork nachos	Bobby Flay
78	4	"Sweet and Spicy"	February 10, 2016	Katie Lee, Damaris Phillips	chocolate & chillies	Carlos Baez, Steven Scalesse	Susan Feniger, Richard Sandoval, Pamela Morgan	chicken mole	Bobby Flay
79	5	"A Feather in Your Cap"	February 17, 2016	Alex Guarnaschelli, Sunny Anderson	duck breast	Mohan Ismail, Nicole Roarke	Wylie Dufresne, Ed Schoenfeld, Frank Pellegrino Jr.	seafood lo mein	Mohan Ismail
80	6	"The Boys Are Back"	February 24, 2016	Michael Symon, Michael Voltaggio	jarred tuna	Todd Hall, Brian Archibald	Julian Medina, Tricia Williams, Franklin Becker	steak torta	Brian Archibald
81	7	"Always Expect the Unexpected"	March 2, 2016	Ted Allen, Kelsey Nixon	sirloin steak	Matt Levin, Sanaa Abourezk	Michael Psilakis, Corby Kummer, Jeremy Spector	vegetarian moussaka	Bobby Flay

=== Season 8 ===
No.	#	Title	Original airdate	First round			Second round		
No.	#	Title	Original airdate	Guest(s)	Ingredient(s)	Contestants	Judges	Dish	Winner
82	1	"Turning the Tables"	March 17, 2016	Katie Lee	spinach	Alex Guarnaschelli, Michael Symon	Michael Lomonaco, April Bloomfield, Wylie Dufresne	lobster Newberg	Alex Guarnaschelli
83	2	"Pie in the Sky"	March 24, 2016	Maria Menounos, Scott Conant	striped bass	Branden Levine, Damon Gordon	Donal Brophy, Michael Lomonaco, Pete Levin	shepherd's pie	Bobby Flay
84	3	"Time to Get Schooled"	March 31, 2016	Anne Burrell, Curtis Stone	asparagus	Cindy Wolf, Stacie Vande Wetering	Jean-Paul Bourgeouis, Cedric Vongerichten, Franklin Becker	seafood risotto	Bobby Flay
85	4	"Something Sweet"	April 7, 2016	Bobby Deen, Sunny Anderson	cherry	Caprial Pence, Ty Leon	Johnny Iuzzini, Paulette Goto, Zac Young	cream puffs	Bobby Flay
86	5	"Have Merci!"	April 14, 2016	Alex Guarnaschelli, Josh Capon	artichoke hearts	Gui Alinat, Kevin Ashade	Marco Moreira, Aliya LeeKong, Alain Allegretti	coq au vin	Kevin Ashade
87	6	"Just Act Natural"	April 21, 2016	Ina Garten, Neil Patrick Harris	piquillo pepper	Gail Arnold, Thomas John	Richie Notar, Madhur Jaffrey, Jehangir Mehta	chicken shawarma	Bobby Flay
88	7	"Riding the Wave"	April 28, 2016	Katie Lee, Simon Majumdar	lamb tenderloin	Shaymus Alwin, Jeremy Sewall	Jamie Bissonnette, Keri Glassman, Ed McFarland	lobster bisque	Bobby Flay
89	8	"Fully Baked"	May 5, 2016	Geoffrey Zakarian, Scott Conant	plantain	Robert Vasquez, Aaron Rivera	Michael Laiskonis, Ivy Stark, Roberto Santibáñez	beef empanada	Aaron Rivera
90	9	"Hall of Shame"	May 12, 2016	Giada De Laurentiis, Jerome Bettis	okra	Kenny Gilbert, Jordan Wakefield	Tom Birchard, Lisle Richards, Ken Friedman	chicken & dumplings	Kenny Gilbert
91	10	"Star Power"	May 19, 2016	Jeff Mauro, Eddie Jackson	Dover sole	Jesse Schenker, Danny Mena	Julian Medina, Rosanna Scotto, Madison Cowan	tortilla soup	Bobby Flay
92	11	"Ring of Fire"	May 26, 2016	Jeff Mauro, Anthony Anderson	mahi-mahi	Adrianne Calvo, Ben Thomas	Michael Lomonaco, Tracy Weiss, Brian Duffy	steak au poivre	Bobby Flay
93	12	"Fingerlings Crossed!"	June 2, 2016	Geoffrey Zakarian, Diane Guerrero	fingerling potato	Philippe Corbet, George Rodrigues	Roberto Santibáñez, Paulette Goto, Brian Mazza	chili	George Rodrigues
94	13	"A Little Bit Country"	June 5, 2016	Alex Guarnaschelli, Trisha Yearwood	bay scallop	Lee Frank, Joe Wolfson	Hugh Mangum, Elizabeth Karmel, Marc Murphy	country fried steak	Bobby Flay

=== Season 9 ===
No.	#	Title	Original airdate	First round			Second round		
No.	#	Title	Original airdate	Guest(s)	Ingredient(s)	Contestants	Judges	Dish	Winner
95	1	"Fancy Meeting You Here"	June 12, 2016	Sunny Anderson	prosciutto	Anne Burrell, Scott Conant	Ken Oringer, Susan Ungaro, Jacques Torres	cheesecake	Anne Burrell
96	2	"Breaking Food News"	June 19, 2016	Michael Symon, Katie Couric	mackerel	Michael Ginor, Alyssa Gorelick	Michael Psilakis, Leah Cohen, George Mendes	lamb gyro	Bobby Flay
97	3	"Red, White, and BBQ"	June 26, 2016	Katie Lee, Elvis Duran	chicken wings	Brother Luck, Matt Bolus	Raquel Pelzel, Corby Kummer, Elizabeth Karmel	pulled pork sliders	Brother Luck
98	4	"Green with Envy"	July 7, 2016	Scott Conant, Perrey Reeves	silken tofu	Pankaj Pradhan, Vikki Krinsky	Michael Schulson, Keri Glassman, Sal Scognamillo	stuffed peppers	Bobby Flay
99	5	"Dancing With the Devil"	July 14, 2016	Lance Bass, Michael Voltaggio	veal cutlet	Robbie Jester, James Laird	Frank Pellegrino, Tricia Williams, Stratis Morfogen	shrimp scampi	Robbie Jester
100	6	"Ladies Night"	July 21, 2016	Katie Lee, Laura Vitale	romanesco	Eric Levine, Jennifer Janinski	Raquel Pelzel, Richie Natar, Kristin Sollene	tortelloni	Bobby Flay
101	7	"Stop Drop and Roll"	July 28, 2016	Geoffrey Zakarian, Donny Deutsch	cannellini beans	Kevin Naderi, Mark Vecchitto	Maneet Chauhan, Franklin Becker, Dorothy Cann Hamilton	stuffed cabbage rolls	Kevin Naderi
102	8	"So many obstacles"	August 4, 2016	Anne Burrell, Apolo Ohno	couscous	Michele Castelli, Brian Miller	Christian Petroni, Rosanna Scotto, Alex Garcia	meat pizza	Bobby Flay
103	9	"Who's Got This in the Bag"	August 11, 2016	Jet Tila, Debi Mazar	ground lamb	Mark Gaier, Christopher Covelli	Ed Brown, Candice Kumai, Vikas Khanna	fish en papillote	Bobby Flay
104	10	"Age is Just a Number"	August 18, 2016	Sunny Anderson, Kimberly Schlapman	blue cheese	Kevin Des Chenes, Jenny Dorsey	Cobi Levy, Anita Lo, Hugh Mangum	wonton soup	Jenny Dorsey
105	11	"Get in the Zone"	August 25, 2016	Alex Guarnaschelli, Kenny Mayne	Yukon gold potatoes	Jeff Williams, Kevin Templeton	David Massoni, Lourdes Castro, Jason Debriere	chilaquiles	Bobby Flay
106	12	"Bobby's DMV Appointment"	September 1, 2016	Curtis Stone; Haylie Duff	guanciale	Serge Pambo, Todd Gray	Michael Psilakis, Tracy Weiss, Hugh Mangum	soft-shell crab sandwich	Bobby Flay
107	13	"Dark Horses Still Kick"	September 8, 2016	Geoffrey Zakarian, Debi Mazar	branzino	Ed Hardy, Kunal Lamba	Hari Nayak, Dorothy Cann Hamilton, Hung Huynh	chicken bánh mì	Bobby Flay

=== Season 10 ===
No.	#	Title	Original airdate	First round			Second round		
No.	#	Title	Original airdate	Guest(s)	Ingredient(s)	Contestants	Judges	Dish	Winner
108	1	"Comforts of Home"	September 22, 2016	Scott Conant, Bethenny Frankel	ground pork	Jackie Rothong, Matteo Boffo	Frank Prisinzano, Jody Adams, Salvatore Coppola	cannelloni	Bobby Flay
109	2	"Shore Fire Strategy"	September 29, 2016	Anne Burrell, Mario Cantone	squab	Geoff Johnson, Martin Rios	Ed Brown, Clodagh McKenna, Craig Samuel	lobster thermidor	Bobby Flay
110	3	"Howdy Halloween"	October 6, 2016	Sunny Anderson, Laura Vitale	blood oranges	Katherine Clapner, Joe Baker	David Lebovitz, Nicole Friday, Zac Young	devil's food cake	Katherine Clapner
111	4	"Bobby-Bing Bobby-Boom!"	October 13, 2016	Anthony Carrino, John Colaneri, Alex Guarnaschelli	kalamata olives	Toni Sapienza, Rodney Murillo	Nick Defonte, Kristin Sollenne, Dale Talde	meatball sandwich	Bobby Flay
112	5	"Che-Sing Glory"	October 20, 2016	Geoffrey Zakarian, Michael Che	country ham	Tony Nguyen, Andres Dangond	Judy Joo, Ivan Orkin, Ivy Stark	ramen	Bobby Flay
113	6	"Hold on for One More Flay"	October 27, 2016	Katie Lee, Carnie Wilson	butchery brioche	Jeremy Nolen, Vijay Sadhu	Aliya LeeKong, Edi Frauneder, Julie Sahni	samosas	Vijay Sadhu
114	7	"Surprise Surprise"	November 3, 2016	Curtis Stone, Sandra Lee	haddock	Pat Sheerin, Katie Chin	Michel Nischan, Anita Lo, Hung Huynh	pork fried rice	Bobby Flay
115	8	"Country Boys in the Big City"	November 10, 2016	Ted Allen, Anne Burrell	black beans	Mike Johnson, Justin Gaines	Jean Paul Bourgeois, Candice Kumai, Michael Psilakis	jambalaya	Bobby Flay
116	9	"Thanks But No Thanksgiving"	November 17, 2016	Martha Stewart, Scott Conant	butternut squash	Ed Cotton, Omar Zerrei	Madison Cowan, Marcie Turney, Felipe Donnelly	turkey cacciatore	Ed Cotton
117	10	"You've Got to be Kidding Me!""	November 30, 2016	Carla Hall, Aubrey Anderson-Emmons, Quvenzhane Wallis	cheddar cheese	Chris Scott, Line Pelletier	Chris Ekpiken, Sabrina Richard, Taylor Moxey	chicken fingers	Bobby Flay
118	11	"Back to School"	December 8, 2016	Ted Allen, Rowan Blanchard	strawberries	Zac Young, Francois Payard	Olivia Oshiro, David Pines, Elizabeth Oakes	Napoleon	Francois Payard
119	12	"Whiz Kids"	December 15, 2016	Gibson Boreli, Tyler Zager, Sunny Anderson	corn flakes	Brian Santos, Claud Beltran	Lauren Zilberman, Finn Skerlj, Emily Waters	beef quesadillas	Bobby Flay
120	13	"Like Father Like Daughter"	December 22, 2016	Scott Conant, Aila Conant	bowtie pasta	Max Hardy, Lee Knoeppel	Hunter Zampa, Julep Knowlton, Tatiana Cicciarella	grilled cheese	Bobby Flay

=== Season 11 ===
No.	#	Title	Original airdate	First round			Second round		
No.	#	Title	Original airdate	Guest(s)	Ingredient(s)	Contestants	Judges	Dish	Winner
121	1	"All at Stake"	January 4, 2017	Amanda Freitag, Carla Hall	Canadian bacon	Todd Erickson, Charles Beur	Jeremy Spector, Michael Ferraro, Dorothy Cann Hamilton	salisbury steak	Todd Erickson
122	2	"Better Late Than Never"	January 11, 2017	Giada De Laurentiis, Alex Guarnaschelli	parsnip	Melissa Mayer, Jen Royle	Jason DeBriere, Sara Gore, Ken Oringer	chicken flautas	Bobby Flay
123	3	"Bro-Down Showdown"	January 18, 2017	Michael Voltaggio, Bryan Voltaggio	sunchokes	Terence Feury, Patrick Feury	Jason Hicks, Raquel Pelzel, Michael Vignola	surf & turf	Bobby Flay
124	4	"Too Biggs to Fail"	January 25, 2017	Katie Lee, Jason Biggs	rock shrimp	David Vargas, Sam Gorenstein	Roberto Santibanez, Alison Roman, Ed McFarland	seafood burrito	Sam Gorenstein
125	5	"The Grid Iron Chef"	February 1, 2017	Alex Guarnaschelli, Josh Capon	jalapeño	Lee Chizmar, Todd Mark Miller	Robbie Shoults, Katie Quinn, Michael Lomonaco	cheesesteak	Bobby Flay
126	6	"She Loves Me ....Not"	February 8, 2017	Daphne Oz, Lara Spencer	red wine	Frank Otte, Eric Adjepong	Susan Ungaro, Glenn Harris, Angie Mar	eggs benedict	Bobby Flay
127	7	"You Won't Like Him When He's Angry"	February 16, 2017	Kristin Cavallari, Geoffrey Zakarian	veal tenderloin	Daniel Angerer, Jamie Knott	Robyn Lawley, Chris "C-Snacks" Clarke, Tricia Williams	veggie burger	Bobby Flay
128	8	"Roll with the Punches"	February 23, 2017	Curtis Stone, Simon Majumdar	razor clams	Perry Chung, Richard Mancini	Hung Huynh, Pamela Morgan, Frank Prisinzano	crispy spring rolls	Perry Chung
129	9	"Steak Me Home Tonight"	March 2, 2017	Anne Burrell, Chris D'Elia	peaches	Trish Tracey, Daniel Cox	Wylie Dufresne, Ariane Daguin, Alfred Portale	steak frites	Bobby Flay
130	10	"Sweet but Sour"	March 9, 2017	Sunny Anderson, Katie Lee	white chocolate	Kym Delost, Chris Teixeira	Michael Laiskonis, Nicole Friday, Niles Noren	apple dumpling	Bobby Flay
131	11	"Thrown from the Throne"	March 16, 2017	Amanda Freitag, Simon Majumdar	heirloom carrots	Ian Bowden, Danielle Duran	Erik Ramirez, April Bloomfield, Joey Campanaro	veal piccata	Bobby Flay
132	12	"I Thought We Were Friends"	March 23, 2017	Giada De Laurentiis, Scott Conant	red snapper	Vuong Loc, Ian Alvarez	Jason Wang, Robbie Shoults, Leah Cohen	chicken pho	Vuong Loc
133	13	"Both Sides of the Coin"	March 30, 2017	Alex Guarnaschelli, Anne Burrell,	quail eggs	Jason Tom, Admir Alibasic	Michael Stillman, Brian Mazza, Harold Moore	sloppy joe	Bobby Flay

=== Season 12 ===
No.	#	Title	Original airdate	First round			Second round		
No.	#	Title	Original airdate	Guest(s)	Ingredient(s)	Contestants	Judges	Dish	Winner
134	1	"Iron Chef Redemption"	April 12, 2017	Ted Allen, Debi Mazar	sun-dried tomatoes	Todd Stein, Paul Virant	Susan Feniger, Billy Durnan, Alex Thermopoulos	brick chicken	Bobby Flay
135	2	"Mazel Tov"	April 19, 2017	Michael Symon, Susan Lucci	broccoli rabe	Alex Reznik, Colin Smith	Lidia Bastianich, Noah Bernamoff, Olivia Culpo	matzo ball soup	Alex Reznik
136	3	"Challah at Your Boy!"	May 3, 2017	Anne Burrell, Jay Pharoah	challah bread	Rene Rodriguez, Michael Kramer	Ivy Stark, Jeremy Jacobowirz, Lidia Bastianich	huevos rancheros	Rene Rodriguez
137	4	"Tame in the Flame"	May 10, 2017	Scott Conant, Busy Philipps	duck confit	Ivana Raca, Tom Wolfe	Einat Admony, Lazarus Lynch, Anita Lo	branzino	Bobby Flay
138	5	"Inside Scoop"	May 17, 2017	Alex Guarnaschelli, Helene Yorke	top round of beef	Steven Oakley, Bobby Hanson	Madison Cowan, April Bloomfield, Jimmy Bradley	seafood corndogs	Steven Oakley
139	6	"Open Grill Season"	May 24, 2017	Sunny Anderson, Gail Simmons	meyer lemon	Brandon Byrd, Nicolay Adinaguev	Michael Lomonaco, Jess Pryles, Robbie Shoults	carne asada	Bobby Flay
140	7	"Friends in All Places"	May 31, 2017	Michael Symon	king crab	Jet Tila, Alex Guarnaschelli	Ed McFarland, Leah Cohen, Drew Neoporent	sole almondine	Alex Guarnaschelli
141	8	"The Next Food Network Star Is..."	June 7, 2017	Alton Brown	persimmons	Damaris Phillips, Justin Warner	Donal Brophy, Tricia Williams, Michael Psilakis	tuna noodle casserole	Damaris Phillips
142	9	"Deja Flay"	June 14, 2017	Scott Conant	grapefruit	Anne Burrell, Marcus Samuelsson	Sileshi Alifom, Sara Moulton, Michael Laiskonis	chicken doro wat	Marcus Samuelsson
143	10	"BBF vs. Chopped"	June 22, 2017	Ted Allen	colossal shrimp	Amanda Freitag, Marc Murphy	Najmieh Batmanglij, April Bloomfield, Kristin Sollenne	fesenjān	Amanda Freitag
144	11	"Ghosts of Bobby's Past"	June 29, 2017	Laura Prepon, Daphne Oz	filet mignon	Einat Admony, Leia Gaccione	Tom Birchard, Susan Ungaro, Alon Shaya	pork chops and applesauce	Bobby Flay
145	12	"Salty and Sweet"	July 6, 2017	Katie Lee, Carla Hall	Raisin	Bruno Feldeisen, Michelle Gayer	Paulette Goto, David Lebovitz, Nicole Friday	Banana cream pie	Bobby Flay
146	13	"Record Breaking"	July 13, 2017	Josh Capon, Jaymee Sire	steamer clams	Joshua Bedford, Jarad Gallagher	Ed Schoenfeld, Maggie Nemser, Spencer Rubin	egg drop soup	Bobby Flay

=== Season 13 ===
No.	#	Title	Original airdate	First round			Second round		
No.	#	Title	Original airdate	Guest(s)	Ingredient(s)	Contestants	Judges	Dish	Winner
147	1	"Sugar and Spice but not so nice"	July 20, 2017	Alton Brown, Adam Richman	Coffee Beans	Josh Johnson, Dana Cree	Samantha Seneviratne, Nils Noren, Raiza Costa	Brownie Sundae	Dana Cree
148	2	"Fancy vs Rustic"	July 27, 2017	Sunny Anderson, Katie Lee	Figs	Angie Berry, Giuliano Matarese	Ed Brown, Rohini Dey, Corby Kummer	Shrimp and Grits	Bobby Flay
149	3	"Bear-Ware"	August 3, 2017	Alex Guarnaschelli, Daphne Oz	Merguez sausage	Hal Holden-Bache, Derek Orrell	Jason Debriere, Claudia Fleming, Craig Samuel	Oysters Rockefeller	Bobby Flay
150	4	"Green, White and Red"	August 10, 2017	Anne Burrell, Scott Conant	Turbot	Raffaele Ronca, Ken Vedrinski	Frank Prisinzano, Kristin Sollenne, Dan Pashman	Gnudi	Ken Vedrinski
151	5	"Chop Chop"	August 17, 2017	Amanda Freitag, Jet Tila	Gruyere Cheese	Fabio Mura, Nicole Votano	Glenn Harris, Michele Ragussis, Joe Isidori	Breakfast Sandwich	Bobby Flay
152	6	"Familiar Names and Faces"	August 24, 2017	Ted Allen, Sunny Anderson	Coconut Milk	Stephen Kalt, Brad Spence	Lex Taylor, Raquel Pelzel, Nguyen Tran	Patty Melt	Stephen Kalt
153	7	"International Showdown"	August 31, 2017	Katie Lee, Marcus Samuelsson	Green Beans	Alida Solomon, Pasquale Cozzolino	Lauren Hirschberg, Barbara Lynch, Rich Aronovitch	White Clams Pizza	Bobby Flay
154	8	"Feathered and Fried"	September 7, 2017	Anne Burrell, Marc Murphy	Rabbit Legs	Thomas Boemer, Darnell Ferguson	Melba Wilson, Daniel Delaney, Sarah Simmons	Fried Chicken	Bobby Flay
155	9	"Pulling Out All the Stops"	September 14, 2017	Steve Schirripa, Simon Majumdar	White Anchovies	Dave Bazirgan, Stephen Jones	Stephen Starr, Susan Povich, Jean-Paul Bourgeois	Hoppin' John	Stephen Jones
156	10	"Number One Baby"	September 21, 2017	Scott Conant, Laura Vitale	Tri-Tip Of Beef	Nicolas Bour, RJ Moody	Tom Birchard, Leah Cohen, Roberto Trevino	Salt Cod Fritters	Bobby Flay
157	11	"Drop the Knife"	September 28, 2017	Colin Quinn, Katie Lee	Collard Greens	Diane Vista-Wayne, Lauren Brown	Angie Mar, Ed Mcfarland, Ariane Daguin	Savory Souffle	Lauren Brown
158	12	"Boil and Trouble"	October 5, 2017	Giada De Laurentiis, Daphne Oz	Pumpkin Seeds	Jeffrey Hansell, Meghann Ward	Wylie Dufresne, Alon Shaya, Dale Talde	Frog Legs	Bobby Flay
159	13	"We're All Family Here"	October 12, 2017	Sophie Flay, Alton Brown	Tomatillos	Jonathan Waxman, Dean Fearing	Marc Vetri, Lourdes Castro, Christian Petroni	Tagliatelle	Bobby Flay

=== Season 14 ===
No.	#	Title	Original airdate	First round			Second round		
No.	#	Title	Original airdate	Guest(s)	Ingredient(s)	Contestants	Judges	Dish	Winner
160	1	"Feeling Bleu"	October 19, 2017	Alex Guarnaschelli, Bobby Moynihan	Halloumi Cheese	Marcellus Coleman, Lionel Haeberle	Raquel Pelzel, Madison Cowan, Keri Glassman	Chicken Cordon Bleu	Lionel Haeberle
161	2	"Take a Bao"	October 26, 2017	David Alan Grier, Carla Hall	Black Cod	Suchanan Aksornnan, Richard Hales	Cobi Levy, Angie Mar, Wilson Tang	Pork Bun	Bobby Flay
162	3	"Ain't That Dandy"	November 2, 2017	Katie Lee, Ben Feldman	Pork Chops	Jason Dady, Mike DeCamp	Drew Crane, Dale Talde, Marco Canora	Poke	Bobby Flay
163	4	"The Iron Age"	November 9, 2017	Alex Guarnaschelli, Simon Majumdar	Onions	Jose Garces, Stephanie Izard	Donatella Arpaia, Madison Cowan, Susan Ungaro	Seafood Paella	Bobby Flay
164	5	"Turkey's Done"	November 16, 2017	Sunny Anderson, Sophie Flay	Turkey Cutlets	Clayton Chapman, Tony Priolo	Brian Mazza, Einat Admony, Ronnie Woo	Pumpkin Ravioli	Tony Priolo
165	6	"Sea Shells by the Sea Shore"	November 23, 2017	Marcus Samuelsson, Michael Voltaggio	Sea Urchin	Ed Harris, Jason McLeod	Michael Schulson, Abigail Hitchcock, Alain Allegretti	Coquilles St.-Jacques	Bobby Flay
166	7	"Rotten Tomatoes for Bobby"	November 30, 2017	Scott Conant, Helene Yorke	Green Tomatoes	Andre Fowles, Darren Sayphraraj	Ed Schoenfeld, Aliya LeeKong, Nigel Spence	Hot And Sour Soup	Darren Sayphraraj
167	8	"Holidays Are for Battle"	December 7, 2017	Alex Guarnaschelli, Tia Mowry	Cornish Game Hens	Simone Falco, Eoghain O'Neill	Ariane Daguin, Frank Prisinzano, Jackie Gebel	Ossobuco	Simone Falco
168	9	"Cracking a Win"	December 14, 2017	Anne Burrell, Andrew Zimmern	Soft Shell Crabs	David Baruthio, Blake Hartwick	Michael Lomonaco, Ali Rosen, Daniel Eddy	Scotch Egg	Bobby Flay
169	10	"Big Dog on the Block"	December 21, 2017	Sunny Anderson	Ostrich Egg	Harold Baker, Tony Minadakis	Craig Samuel, Kardea Brown, Matt FX	Ginormous Seafood Sandwich	Bobby Flay
170	11	"Windy City Wants More"	December 28, 2017	Scott Conant, Hannah Hart	Purple Potatoes	David Adjey, Cory Morris	Billy Durney, Lourdes Castro, Isaac Toups	Ropa Vieja	Cory Morris
171	12	"Who Done It?"	January 4, 2018	Lorraine Pascale, Damaris Phillips	Prosecco	Jeremy Fogg, Andrea Bergin	Paulette Goto, Zac Young, Marcy Blum	Ice Cream Sandwich	Jeremy Fogg
172	13	"Clamming Up"	January 11, 2018	Amanda Freitag, Geoffrey Zakarian	Cockles	Kiran Patnam, Jonathan Wu	Tricia Williams, Jehangir Mehta, Tracy Jane Young	Butter Chicken Masala	Kiran Patnam

=== Season 15 ===
No.	#	Title	Original airdate	First round			Second round		
No.	#	Title	Original airdate	Guest(s)	Ingredient(s)	Contestants	Judges	Dish	Winner
173	1	"Midwest Swing"	January 18, 2018	Katie Lee, Daphne Oz	Hake	Daniel Angerer, Mike Johnson	Andrew Friedman, Lucinda Scala Quinn, Hugh Mangum	Barbecued Chicken	Bobby Flay
174	2	"Peeling Away"	January 25, 2018	Ted Allen, Busy Philipps	Bananas	Amanda Rockman, Vicki Wells	Nils Norén, Raiza Costa, Scott Levine	Tiramisu	Amanda Rockman
175	3	"Bobby Gets Sacked"	February 1, 2018	Eddie Jackson, Jaymee Sire	Bratwurst	Paul Malvone, Jack Riebel	Jeremy Ford, Melba Wilson, Robbie Shoults	Jucy Lucy	Bobby Flay
176	4	"Broken Hearts"	February 8, 2018	Anne Burrell, Scott Conant	Maraschino cherry	Robert Nieto, Caroline Schiff	Jacques Torres, Samantha Seneviratne, Alan Rosen	Chocolate tart	Bobby Flay
177	5	"Going Loco"	February 15, 2018	Eddie Jackson, Damaris Phillips	Shishito Peppers	Mike Andrzejewski, Anthony Nelson	Chung Chow, Nicole Ponseca, Corby Kummer	Loco moco	Mike Andrzejewski
178	6	"Sour With The Sweet"	February 22, 2018	Sunny Anderson, Josh Capon	Cowboy Rib eye steak	Robert Cho, Brian Malarkey	Leah Cohen, Rich Aronovitch, Dana Cowin	Monte Cristo sandwich	Bobby Flay
179	7	"Stuffed and Fried"	March 1, 2018	Katie Lee, Jet Tila	Langoustine	Crista Luedtke, Alan Vargas	Brian Duffy, Ivy Stark, Akhtar Nawab	Chimichanga	Bobby Flay
180	8	"At It Again"	March 8, 2018	Ted Allen, Marc Murphy	Squid Ink	Seis Kamimura, Demetrio Zavala	Michael Psilakis, Leah Cohen, Christian Petroni	Beef Bulgogi	Bobby Flay
181	9	"Surf's Up"	March 15, 2018	Anne Burrell, Loni Love	Basil	Paras Shah, Sheldon Simeon	Bill Telepan, Nicole Ponseca, Roberto Treviño	Pork Adobo	Bobby Flay
182	10	"Revenge Is Best Served Bold"	March 22, 2018	Scott Conant, Laura Vitale	Zucchini	Leia Gaccione, Tony Nguyen	Glenn Harris, Rohini Dey, Hung Huynh	Brunch Burger	Bobby Flay
183	11	"Ladies Don't Play"	March 29, 2018	Daphne Oz, Michael Voltaggio	Fava Beans	Aarthi Sampath, Zoe Schor	Hari Nayak, Alison Roman, Albert Di Meglio	Chicken Biryani	Aarthi Sampath
184	12	"Not a Speck"	April 5, 2018	Sunny Anderson, Carla Hall	Speck	Jonah Miller, Ronny Miranda	Seamus Mullen, Ingrid Hoffmann, David Santos	Peri Peri Chicken	Bobby Flay
185	13	"Getting Crabby"	April 12, 2018	Alex Guarnaschelli, Jet Tila	Cucumber	Mark Laubner, Brendan Pelley	Michael Psilakis, April Bloomfield, Drew Nieporent	Crab cake sandwich	Bobby Flay

=== Season 16 ===
No.	#	Title	Original airdate	First round			Second round		
No.	#	Title	Original airdate	Guest(s)	Ingredient(s)	Contestants	Judges	Dish	Winner
186	1	"Red Hot"	April 19, 2018	Katie Lee, Giada De Laurentiis	Red Kidney bean	Ashbell McElveen, John Cox	Dale Talde, Ivy Stark, Lazarus Lynch	Pancake	Bobby Flay
187	2	"Worldly Ways"	April 26, 2018	Sunny Anderson, Andrew Zimmern	Manchego	Jared Forman, Fabio Viviani	Frank Prisinzano, Lidia Bastianich, Marco Canora	Spaghetti with meatballs	Fabio Viviani
188	3	"Sticky Situation"	May 3, 2018	Michael Symon, Marcela Valladolid	Peanut butter	Clarice Lam, Avery Ruzicka	Jen King, Zac Young, Tracy Obolsky	S'more	Bobby Flay
189	4	"Sprung a Leek"	May 10, 2018	Damaris Phillips, Amanda Freitag	Leek	Shota Nakajima, Jamie Gwen	Drew Nieporent, Sara Gore, Charles Parker	Tempura	Shota Nakajima
190	5	"Stealing the Spotlight"	May 17, 2018	Ina Garten, Laura Benanti	Dates	Paulette Goto, Ed Schoenfeld	Mary Sue Milliken, Michael Solomonov, Lucinda Scala Quinn	Chicken marsala	Bobby Flay
191	6	"Grill Me"	May 24, 2018	Katie Lee, Mekhi Phifer	Korean-Style Short ribs	Lisa Dahl, Nathan Gresham	Timothy Walker, Sasha Miranda, Brian Duffy	Beef Slider	Bobby Flay
192	7	"Eye of the Tiger"	May 31, 2018	Alex Guarnaschelli, Eddie Jackson	Tiger Prawns	Dale Levitski, Manish Tyagi	Jehangir Mehta, Elise Kornack, Ronnie Woo	Palak paneer	Manish Tyagi
193	8	"Food Star Face-Off"	June 7, 2018	Anne Burrell, Patti LaBelle	Manila Clams	Dom Tesoriero, Viet Pham	Hugh Mangum, Dana Cowin, John Seymour	Hot chicken	Viet Pham
194	9	"Beauty and the Beast"	June 14, 2018	Scott Conant, Olivia Culpo	Smoked salmon	Deb Caplan, Nicholas Lisotto	Jacob Hadjigeorgis, Melba Wilson, Christian Petroni	Cacio e pepe	Bobby Flay
195	10	"Skirting By"	June 21, 2018	Sunny Anderson, Susie Essman	Skirt steak	Robert Sisca, Michael Brennan	Frank Pellegrino, Jr., Rosanna Scotto, Ed McFarland	Bouillabaisse	Robert Sisca
196	11	"Blast From the Past"	June 28, 2018	Amanda Freitag, Katie Lee	T-bone steak	Allison Fasano, Paul Del Favero	Gabriel Israel, Lourdes Castro, David Santos	Seafood Cataplana	Bobby Flay
197	12	"Hit Him Again"	July 5, 2018	Scott Conant, Daphne Oz	Rainbow Chard	Thomas Boemer, Bao Bao	Sohui Kim, John Terzian, Tracy Jane Young	Chicken and dumplings	Thomas Boemer
202	13	"Fields of Green"	August 2, 2018	Alex Guarnaschelli, Damaris Phillips	Mustard Greens	Maeve Rochford, Navjot Arora	Hari Nayak, Aliya LeeKong, Lisle Richards	Savory Hand Pies	Bobby Flay

=== Season 17 ===
No.	#	Title	Original airdate	First round			Second round		
No.	#	Title	Original airdate	Guest(s)	Ingredient(s)	Contestants	Judges	Dish	Winner
198	1	"Judges As Contenders"	July 12, 2018	Sunny Anderson, Marcus Samuelsson	Stout	Michael Psilakis, Seamus Mullen	Elly Truesdell, Michael Lomonaco, Ariane Daguin	Coconut Seafood Curry	Bobby Flay
199	2	"Waltz Up a Win"	July 19, 2018	Derek Hough, Carla Hall	Honeycomb toffee	Olivier Palazzo, Katy Gerdes	Paulette Goto, Scott Levine, Ayala Donchin	Chocolate Soufflé	Olivier Palazzo
200	3	"Culinary Knockout"	July 26, 2018	Giada De Laurentiis, Michael Voltaggio	Snap pea	Geronimo Lopez, Frances Tariga	Seamus Mullen, Nicole Ponseca, Corby Kummer	Lomo saltado	Bobby Flay
201	4	"Flying Aubergines"	July 29, 2018	Anne Burrell, Jet Tila	Japanese Eggplant	Tony Gemignani, Robert Aikens	Ken Oringer, Tricia Williams, Madison Cowan	Bubble and squeak	Robert Aikens
203	5	"Winning in My Dreams"	August 5, 2018	Debbie Gibson, Katie Lee	Quahog Clam	Ype Von Hengst, William Wright	Peter Giannakis, Sawako Okochi, Michael Vignola	Chicken Satay	Bobby Flay
204	6	"Never Give Up"	August 9, 2018	Alex Guarnaschelli, Stephanie Izard	Tasso ham	Pasquale Cozzolino, Ivana Raca	Michel Nischan, Sara Gore, Michael Psilakis	Gnocchi	Ivana Raca
205	7	"Chocolate Victory"	August 16, 2018	Michael Symon, Valerie Bertinelli	Mexican Chocolate	Katy Smith, Jose Guerrero	Felipe Donnelly, Ivy Stark, Michael Schulson	Tlayuda	Bobby Flay
206	8	"Joke's on Bobby"	August 23, 2018	Emilie de Ravin, Katie Lee	Quinoa	Jamie Lynch, Shorne Benjamin	Carlos Swepson, Hannah Bronfman, Bill Telepan	Pumpkin Curry	Bobby Flay
207	9	"Fit to Flay"	August 30, 2018	Scott Conant, Jane Seymour	Mascarpone Cheese	Silvia Barban, Nate Appleman	Rob Petrone, Donatella Arpaia, Jimmy Bradley	Chicken Adobo	Bobby Flay
208	10	"Skating By"	September 6, 2018	Anne Burrell, Jaymee Sire	Skate	Nicole Brisson, Adam Greenberg	Leah Cohen, Albert Di Meglio, Einat Admony	Chicken Scarpariello	Adam Greenberg
209	11	"Feel The Judgment"	September 13, 2018	Jet Tila, Laura Vitale	Salt Cod	Christian Petroni, Leah Cohen	Bill Telepan, Raiza Costa, Garrison Price	Fregula and Clams	Bobby Flay
210	12	"Chop of the Mornin' to Ya"	September 20, 2018	Amanda Freitag, Laura Vitale	Lamb Loin chop	Asif Syed, Jordan Frosolone	Hari Nayak, Alison Roman, Sabin Lomac	Tandoori Chicken	Asif Syed
212	13	"Fright Club"	October 4, 2018	Jesse Palmer, Eddie Jackson	Chicken Livers	John Patterson, Frank Terzoli	Aliya LeeKong, Joe Isidori, Ingrid Hoffmann	Squid Ink Pasta	Bobby Flay

=== Season 18 ===
No.	#	Title	Original airdate	First round			Second round		
No.	#	Title	Original airdate	Guest(s)	Ingredient(s)	Contestants	Judges	Dish	Winner
211	1	"Shucking The Competition"	September 27, 2018	Geoffrey Zakarian, Damaris Phillips	Oysters	Laurent Zirotti, Eric Damidot	Ariane Daguin, Brian Mazza, Elise Kornack	Beef Bourguignon	Bobby Flay
213	2	"Aged to Perfection"	October 11, 2018	Michael Strahan, Michael Symon	Aged Balsamic vinegar	Anastacia Song, Joey Ward	Michael Schulson, Leah Cohen, Richie Notar	Chicken and waffles	Joey Ward
214	3	"Family Matters"	October 18, 2018	Daphne Oz, Jourdan Dunn	Fresh Apricot	Beto Rodarte, Julian Rodarte	Jason Debriere, Pati Jinich, Lisle Richards	Fideos Carnitas	Bobby Flay
215	4	"Knighted Sir Loin"	October 25, 2018	Alex Guarnaschelli, Michael Voltaggio	Lamb Sirloin	Tracey Shepos Cenami, John Vitale	Michael Psilakis, Lucinda Scala Quinn, Madison Cowan	Eggplant Rollatini	Bobby Flay
216	5	"Baked to Perfection"	November 1, 2018	Ted Allen, Gesine Bullock-Prado	Pecans	Mathew Rice, Thiago Silva	Amirah Kassem, Paulette Goto, Ayala Donchin	Chocolate Layer Cake	Thiago Silva
217	6	"Drop the Mic"	November 8, 2018	Amanda Freitag, Jo Koy	Monkfish	Ryan Hackney, Nora Haron	Dale, Anita, Simpson Wong	Gai Yang chicken	Bobby Flay
218	7	"Stuffed With Victory"	November 15, 2018	Geoffrey Zakarian, Sara Haines	Brussels Sprouts	Bernard Carmouche, Daniel Sharp	Georgette Farkas, Frank Prisinzano, Allison Fasano	Roasted Chicken	Bobby Flay
219	8	"Say Cheese!"	November 22, 2018	Giada De Laurentiis, Sunny Anderson	Gorgonzola cheese	Duskie Estes, Francesco Buitoni	Dale Talde, Ivy Stark, Kevin Sbraga	Seafood Fra Diavolo	Bobby Flay
220	9	"Cream of the Crop"	November 29, 2018	Katie Lee, Valerie Bertinelli	Cream cheese	Chris Henry, Steve Gedra	Craig Samuel, Dana Cowin, Tom Birchard	Fried Green Tomato Sandwich	Chris Henry
221	10	"Wrapping Up Victory"	December 6, 2018	Amanda Freitag, Jamie-Lynn Sigler	Dried cranberry	Ron Duprat, Gabriel Pascuzzi	Marc Vetri, Rosanna Scotto, Mark Ladner	Cioppino	Bobby Flay
222	11	"Sprouting Victory"	December 27, 2018	Scott Conant, Anne Burrell	Mushrooms	Lawrence Letrero, Jack Moore	Ronnie Woo, Sara Gore, Pete Levin	Poutine	Bobby Flay
223	12	"Sweet, Sweet Revenge!"	January 3, 2019	Michael Symon, Josh Capon	Blueberry	Clarice Lam, Caroline Schiff	Paulette Goto, Melissa Weller, Emma Bengtsson	Key lime pie	Bobby Flay
224	13	"Heavy Lifting"	January 10, 2019	Alton Brown, Jet Tila	Soppressata	Jonathon Sawyer, Mark Ladner	Frank Prisinzano, Rita Jammet, Fabio Trabocchi	Shrimp Scampi	Bobby Flay
225	14	"Oh Brother"	January 17, 2019	Alex Guarnaschelli, Gus Kenworthy	Porgy	Brian Redzikowski, Steve Redzikowski	Hannah Cheng, Christian Petroni, Marian Cheng	Asian Dumplings	Steve Redzikowski

=== Season 19 ===
No.	#	Title	Original airdate	First round			Second round		
No.	#	Title	Original airdate	Guest(s)	Ingredient(s)	Contestants	Judges	Dish	Winner
226	1	"Take Him to Fresno"	January 24, 2019	Alex Guarnaschelli, Ben Rappaport	Fresno Chiles	Chad Clevenger, Anita Cartagena	David Massoni, Aliya LeeKong, Jonah Reider	Empanada	Chad Clevenger
227	2	"Game On"	January 31, 2019	Anne Burrell, Eddie Jackson	Pickles	Jeff Henderson, Ashley Gaboriault	Pete Levin, Grace Ramirez, Wylie Dufresne	Chili Cheese fries	Ashley Gaboriault
228	3	"Old Friends"	February 3, 2019	Ted Allen, Sunny Anderson	Cabbage	Michael Psilakis, Einat Admony	Christian Petroni, Leah Cohen, Bryce Shuman	Lamb Risotto	Michael Psilakis
229	4	"Getting Nutty"	February 7, 2019	Laura Vitale, Michael Voltaggio	Macadamia Nuts	Alex Brugger, Tatiana Rosana	Louie Estrada, Donatella Arpaia, Felipe Donnelly	Fricasé de Pollo	Bobby Flay
230	5	"Choc-O-Love"	February 14, 2019	Alton Brown, Valerie Bertinelli	Cocoa Nibs	Ryan Scott, David Lebovitz	Corby Kummer, Jen King, Michael Laiskonis	Flourless Chocolate cake	Bobby Flay
231	6	"Don't Drop The Beat (Bobby)"	February 21, 2019	Michael Symon, Brooke Shields	Fregula	Carla Pellegrino, Idris Muhammad	Sara Gore, Ray Garcia, Rosanna Scotto	Braciole	Bobby Flay
232	7	"Off to the Races"	February 28, 2019	Josh Capon, Carolyn Manno	Rice noodles	Jouvens Jean, Bruce Naftaly	John Seymour, Lourdes Castro, Tom Birchard	Ham Croquettes	Bobby Flay
233	8	"Don't Sour Out"	March 7, 2019	Katie Lee, Marc Murphy	Sourdough bread	Austin Cobb, Silvia Baldini	Marco Canora, Angie Rito, Laurent Tourondel	Pasta Primavera	Bobby Flay
234	9	"Mince Meat"	March 14, 2019	Scott Conant, Donatella Arpaia	Ground Veal	Fernando Ruiz, Paco Garcia	Joe Isidori, Sue Torres, Seamus Mullen	Chiles en nogada	Fernando Ruiz
235	10	"Greeking Out"	March 21, 2019	Anne Burrell, Jose Garces	Greek Yogurt	Ryan Lory, Aneesa Waheed	Alain Allegretti, Tricia Williams, Akhtar Nawab	Coq au vin	Bobby Flay
236	11	"A Marital Match"	March 28, 2019	Sunny Anderson, Jeff Mauro	Honeydew	Sam Carroll, Cody Carroll	Melba Wilson, Trigg Brown, Kardea Brown	Chicken Gumbo	Sam Carroll
237	12	"Nutty Times"	April 4, 2019	Geoffrey Zakarian, Amanda Freitag	Almond butter	Dante Giannini, Eliza Gavin	Sara Moulton, Ed Brown, Ariane Daguin	Crab cake	Bobby Flay

=== Season 20 ===
No.	#	Title	Original airdate	First round			Second round		
No.	#	Title	Original airdate	Guest(s)	Ingredient(s)	Contestants	Judges	Dish	Winner
238	1	"Against the Grain"	April 11, 2019	Ted Allen, Damaris Phillips	Farro	Sara Nguyen, Paul Fehribach	Andrew Friedman, Aliya LeeKong, Jimmy Bradley	Breakfast Sandwich	Paul Fehribach
239	2	"They Took the Cheese"	April 18, 2019	Marcus Samuelsson, Anne Burrell	Swiss cheese	Roshni Gurnani, Carl Schaubhut	Sam Talbot, Andrienne Cheatham, Vikas Khanna	Goat Kebab	Bobby Flay
240	3	"A Tropical Punch"	April 25, 2019	Katie Lee, Scott Conant	Mangoes	Zach Meloy, Matt Pace	Ken Oringer, Georgette Farkas, Richie Notar	Fried Oyster Po'boy	Matt Pace
241	4	"Pump It Up"	May 2, 2019	Tony Rock, Alex Guarnaschelli	Pumpernickel Bread	Bill Clifton, Stephan Bogurdus	Jimmy Bradley, Melba Wilson, Michael Lomonaco	Corn Chowder	Bobby Flay
242	5	"Something's Fishy"	May 5, 2019	Richard Blais, Natalie Morales	Bluefish	Coby Farrow, Johnny Hernandez	Sara Moulton, Michael Psilakis, Lourdes Castro	Shrimp Taco	Bobby Flay
243	6	"Grapes of Wrath"	May 9, 2019	Alex Guarnaschelli, Buddy Valastro	Grapes	Paulette Goto, Zac Young	Claudia Fleming, Corby Kummer, Raiza Costa	Carrot Cake	Zac Young
244	7	"Making Headlines"	May 16, 2019	Dylan Dreyer, Scott Conant	Pinto Beans	Patrick Simpson, Alvin Savella	Frank Prisinzano, Lucinda Scala Quinn, Chung Chow	Jerk Snapper	Bobby Flay
245	8	"Flame-tastic!"	May 23, 2019	Alex Guarnaschelli, Michael Symon	Plums	Armando Litiatco, Mikala Brennan	Lourdes Castro, David Santos, Michele Ragussis	Skirt steak Churrasco	Bobby Flay
246	9	"Bye Bye Birdie"	May 30, 2019	Michael Symon, Jet Tila	Boneless Quail	Rebecca Weitzman, Brian Lewis	Spike Mendelsohn, Lucinda Scala Quinn, Cesare Casella	Sacchettoni	Brian Lewis
247	10	"Give Me Some Mo!"	June 6, 2019	Sunny Anderson, Katie Lee	Lentils	Andre Gomez, Ramon Perez	Ivy Stark, Jackfry Rosado, Grace Ramirez	Beef Mofongo	Bobby Flay
248	11	"Grind it Out!"	June 13, 2019	Michael Voltaggio, Tony Hawk	Andouille	Pablo Zitzmann, Ming Pu	Wilson Tang, Leah Cohen, Josh Grinker	Kung Pao chicken	Pablo Zitzmann
249	12	"Chi-Town Throws Down"	June 20, 2019	Carla Hall, Sophia Bush	Edamame	Aaron Cuschieri, Jill Barron	David Massoni, Sara Gore, Akhtar Nawab	Fish and chips	Aaron Cuschieri
250	13	"Double Trouble"	June 20, 2019	Damaris Phillips, Daphne Oz	Brie	Enrique Limardo, Jeff Smedstad	Alex Garcia, Vivian Chan, Ricardo Cardona	Chicken enchilada	Bobby Flay

=== Season 21 ===
No.	#	Title	Original airdate	First round			Second round		
No.	#	Title	Original airdate	Guest(s)	Ingredient(s)	Contestants	Judges	Dish	Winner
251	1	"Use Your Noodle"	June 27, 2019	Scott Conant, Geoffrey Zakarian	Soba Noodles	Philippe Haddad, Melissa O'Donnell	Jean-Paul Bourgeois, Jumana Bishara, Christian Schienle	Lamb Kofta	Bobby Flay
252	2	"A Taste Of Summer"	July 4, 2019	Noah Cappe, Anne Burrell	Passion Fruit	Mark Peel, Nick Williams	Ed McFarland, Susan Povich, Kevin Sbraga	Fried Belly Clam Roll	Nick Williams
253	3	"Snaked Out"	July 11, 2019	Marc Murphy, Chris Santos	Cashew	Derek Simcik, Sylva Senat	Einat Admony, Corby Kummer, Adrienne Cheatham	Shakshuka	Bobby Flay
254	4	"Seeing Stars"	July 18, 2019	Damaris Philips, Richard Blais	Breakfast Sausage	Alex McCoy, Jay Ducote	Jean-Paul Bourgeois, Hong Thaimee, Floyd Cardoz	Crawfish Boil	Jay Ducote
255	5	"It's A Date"	July 25, 2019	Alex Guarnaschelli, Alton Brown	Veal Rib Chops	Lisa Carlson, Carrie Summer	Michael Psilakis, Ayala Donchin, Jake Dell	Meatloaf Sandwich	Bobby Flay
256	6	"Finding Stars"	August 1, 2019	Giada De Laurentiis, Jess Cagle	Arugula	Pano Karatassos, Mimi Weissenborn	Michael Lomonaco, Michele Ragussis, Daniel Breaker	Lamb Pie	Pano Karatassos
257	7	"Clear The Deck"	August 8, 2019	Daphne Oz, Eddie Jackson	Beef Rib Cap	Daniel Gomez Sanchez, Matthew Ridgway	Tricia Williams, Madison Cowan, Keri Glassman	Sole meuniere	Bobby Flay
258	8	"Break A Plate!"	August 15, 2019	Damaris Phillips, Rachael Ray	Rye Bread	Adam Leonti, Anthony Scolaro	Frank Prisinzano, Georgette Farkas, Adam Greenberg	Vegetable Lasagna	Bobby Flay
259	9	"Funny or Fried"	August 22, 2019	Alton Brown, Amanda Freitag	Taleggio Cheese	Gregory Wiener, Daphne Brogdon	Richie Notar, Sue Torres, Hugh Mangum	Cuban Sandwich	Bobby Flay

=== Season 22 ===
No.	#	Title	Original airdate	First round			Second round		
No.	#	Title	Original airdate	Guest(s)	Ingredient(s)	Contestants	Judges	Dish	Winner
260	1	"A Proper Smackdown"	August 29, 2019	Valerie Bertinelli, Clinton Kelly	Asian Pears	Ian Winslade, Geoff Rhyne	Michael Solomonov, Adrienne Cheatham, Alain Allegretti	Fisherman's Pie	Ian Winslade
261	2	"A Pioneering Ordeal"	September 5, 2019	Alex Guarnaschelli, Ree Drummond	Hanger Steak	Jamarius Banks, Vince Giancarlo	Jean-Paul Bourgeois, Melba Wilson, Adrienne Cheatham	Shrimp and Grits	Bobby Flay
262	3	"It's Gonna Be A Late Night"	September 12, 2019	Michael Symon, Seth Meyers	Duck Bacon	Carrie Baird, Lamar Moore	Sara Moulton, Craig Samuel, Ariel Contreras-Fox	Huevos Rancheros	Carrie Baird
263	4	"All In The Family"	September 19, 2019	Carla Hall, Jesse Tyler Ferguson	Horseradish	Michael Bertozzi, Mika Leon	Louie Estrada, Lourdes Castro, Chris Cheung	Picadillo	Bobby Flay
264	5	"It's Gonna Be Jarring"	September 26, 2019	Anne Burrell, Carson Kressley	Anchovy	Kevin Sweeney, Nicco Muratore	Albert Di Meglio, Lauren Scala, Lisle Richards	Agnolotti	Bobby Flay
265	6	"Bobby vs. Food"	September 26, 2019	Eddie Jackson, Casey Webb	Olive	Eric Bolyard, Sarah Murray	Einat Admony, Lisle Richards, Alison Roman	Arròs negre	Bobby Flay
266	7	"Fey vs. Flay"	October 3, 2019	Alex Guarnaschelli, Tina Fey	Rutabaga	Alexcia Smith, Asia Mei	Lucinda Scala Quinn, Michael Lomonaco, Esther Choi	Lamb Shawarma	Bobby Flay
267	8	"They Had Style, They Had Food"	October 10, 2019	Scott Conant, Fran Drescher	Ginger	Jessica Scott, Shelby Sieg	Amirah Kassem, David Lebovitz, Paulette Goto	Olive Oil Cake	Shelby Sieg
268	9	"Keeping It Real"	October 17, 2019	Ted Allen, Jeannie Mai	Rolled Oats	Giuseppe Fanelli, Ryan Depersio	Richie Notar, Georgette Farkas, David Massoni	Chicken Cacciatore	Bobby Flay
269	10	"It Must've Been Love"	October 24, 2019	Jet Tila, Ali Tila	Papaya	Ricardo Castro, Rosana Rivera	Akhtar Nawab, Ivy Stark, Matt FX	Beef Empanada	Rosana Rivera
270	11	"Gobble Till You Wobble"	November 14, 2019	Alex Guarnaschelli, Jay Pharoah	Cornbread	Jason Bissell, Tirzah Love	Wylie Dufresne, Einat Admony, Adam Sappington	Turkey Meatloaf	Bobby Flay
271	12	"A Good Day for a Win"	December 26, 2019	Katie Lee, Mikey Day	Kumquat	Minnie Nguyen, Adam Hodgson	Sara Gore, Kardea Brown, Pati Jinich	Egg Rolls	Bobby Flay
272	13	"Winter Win-Derland"	January 2, 2020	Michael Symon, Bethenny Frankel	Venison Loin	Kevin Hickey, Andrew Wilson	Daniel Breaker, Lucinda Scala Quinn, Daniel Eddy	Duck a l'orange	Bobby Flay

=== Season 23 ===
No.	#	Title	Original airdate	First round			Second round		
No.	#	Title	Original airdate	Guest(s)	Ingredient(s)	Contestants	Judges	Dish	Winner
273	1	"You Look Radishing"	January 5, 2020	Giada De Laurentiis, Betsy Brandt	Radish	Charlie Loomis, Israel Rivera	Richie Notar, Sue Torres, James Briscione	Eggs Benedict	Charlie Loomis
274	2	"Don't Fiddle Around!"	January 9, 2020	Josh Capon, Teri Hatcher	Fiddlehead Ferns	Geoff Lazio, Daniel Wright	Ronnie Woo, Rosanna Scotto, Ed McFarland	Baked Clams	Bobby Flay
275	3	"That's Amore"	January 12, 2020	Carla Hall, Christian Petroni	Chanterelle Mushrooms	Chris Thompson, Daniele Uditi	JJ Johnson, Lauren Scala, Joe Isidori	Pizza Bianca	Daniele Uditi
276	4	"America's Funniest Food Show"	January 16, 2020	Anne Burrell, Bob Saget	Fontina	Sam Diminich, Aliza Green	Marco Canora, Susan Povich, Michael Psilakis	Lobster Risotto	Sam Diminich
277	5	"Pretty Little Fryer"	January 19, 2020	Scott Conant, Sasha Pieterse	Smelts	Anthony LoPinto, Franco Robazetti	Cliff Crooks, Lourdes Castro, Justin Bazdarich	Veal Saltimbocca	Bobby Flay
278	6	"Perched For Victory"	January 26, 2020	Anne Burrell, Valerie Bertinelli	Yellow Perch	Elizabeth Binder, Mike Ellis	Michel Nischan, Ayesha Nurdjaja, Albert Di Meglio	Arancini	Elizabeth Binder
279	7	"This'll Stick In Your Craw"	January 26, 2020	Sunny Anderson, Clinton Kelly	Crawfish	Jojo Vasquez, Brian Riggenbach	Dan Churchill, Leah Cohen, Chris Cheung	Clay Pot Chicken	Bobby Flay
280	8	"The Cheese Stands Alone"	February 2, 2020	Sunny Anderson, Giada De Laurentiis	Farmer's Cheese	Paddy Rawal, Trey Lamont	Floyd Cardoz, Leah Cohen, Nigel Spence	Chicken Tikka Masala	Paddy Rawal
281	9	"Chocolate Covered Clash"	February 9, 2020	Michael Voltaggio, Drew Barrymore	Chocolate Hazelnut Spread	Miriam Taylor, DaVee Harned	Zac Young, Paulette Goto, Scott Levine	Chocolate Cream Pie	Bobby Flay
282	10	"We Will, We Will Judge You"	February 9, 2020	Alex Guarnaschelli, Lou Diamond Phillips	Cotija Cheese	Adrienne Cheatham, Michele Ragussis	Keri Glassman, Craig Samuel, Dana Cowin	Pastitsio	Michele Ragussis
283	11	"The Power of Jane"	February 16, 2020	Michael Symon, Jane Krakowski	Tamarind	Matt Spinner, Attila Bollok	Drew Nieporent, Dana Cowin, Jeremy Salaman	Chicken Schnitzel	Bobby Flay
284	12	"Guess Who's Back"	February 16, 2020	Katie Lee, Josh Capon	Cranberry Beans	Ryan Lory, Jackie Rothong	Frank Prisinzano, Angie Rito, Albert Di Meglio	Pasta Ragù	Bobby Flay

=== Season 24 ===
No.	#	Title	Original airdate	First round			Second round		
No.	#	Title	Original airdate	Guest(s)	Ingredient(s)	Contestants	Judges	Dish	Winner
285	1	"The Queen Is In"	February 23, 2020	Richard Blais, Martha Stewart	Mandarin Oranges	Katherine Fuchs, Michael Mérida	Laurent Tourondel, Ayesha Nurdjaja, Felipe Donnelly	Fish Croquette	Michael Mérida
286	2	"The Lady Butchers"	February 23, 2020	Michael Symon, Courtney Rada	Bison Loin	Penny Barend, Melissa Khoury	Lourdes Castro, Matt Abdoo, Leah Wolfe	Pork Sandwich	Penny Barend
287	3	"This Just In!"	March 1, 2020	Alex Guarnaschelli, Don Lemon	Whole Flounder	Dieter Samijn, Patrick Schaeffer	Adrienne Cheatham, Laurent Tourondel, Abigail Hitchcock	Bacon Cheeseburger	Patrick Schaeffer
288	4	"The Queen Returns"	March 1, 2020	Michael Symon, Martha Stewart	Sunflower Seeds	Max Castro, Sarah Wade	Ariel Fox, Joe Isidori, Kardea Brown	Fried Chicken Sandwich	Bobby Flay
289	5	"We'll Be The Judge"	March 8, 2020	Sunny Anderson, Geoffrey Zakarian	Duck eggs	Ed McFarland, Dale Talde	Michael Anthony, Tricia Williams, Ed Schoenfeld	Wonton Soup	Dale Talde
290	6	"The View From The Top"	March 15, 2020	Michael Symon, Sunny Hostin	Spring Onions	Pom Amaritnant, Troy Gagliardo	Dale Talde, Sara Gore, Ed Schoenfeld	Pork Ramen	Bobby Flay
291	7	"All Dried Out Over You"	March 22, 2020	Anne Burrell, David Burtka	Guajillo Chilies	Rachael Polhill, Ian Redshaw	Abigail Hitchcock, Wylie Dufresne, Ayala Donchin	Surf and Turf	Bobby Flay
292	8	"Don't Sugarcoat It"	March 29, 2020	Marcela Valladolid, Buddy Valastro	Kiwi	Jocelyn Gragg, Kathleen McDaniel	Claudia Fleming, David Lebovitz, Sarah Sanneh	Baklava	Kathleen McDaniel
293	9	"Blast From The Past"	April 5, 2020	Ted Allen, Carla Hall	Serrano Ham	Justin Hunt, Wesley True	Rosanna Scotto, Dan Kluger, Ayesha Nurdjaja	Lamb Meatballs	Bobby Flay
294	10	"BBF: Beat My Best Friend"	April 12, 2020	Michael Symon, Clinton Kelly	Black-Eyed Peas	Sylvain Delpique, Jackie Mazza	Drew Nieporent, Georgette Farkas, Harold Moore	venison Wellington	Sylvain Delpique
295	11	"The Grill Fits The Bill"	April 19, 2020	Anne Burrell, Marc Murphy	Goat Rack	Susie Bulloch, David Bancroft	Hugh Mangum, Amy Mills, Ed McFarland	Ribs	Bobby Flay
296	12	"Sibling Rivalry"	April 26, 2020	Alex Guarnaschelli, Damaris Phillips	Cherry Peppers	Matt Storch, Lisa Storch	Craig Samuel, Dana Cowin, Jake Dell	Kreplach	Lisa Storch
297	13	"No Cake Walk"	May 3, 2020	Sunny Anderson	Black and White Sesame Seeds and Tahini	Alex Guarnaschelli, Buddy Valastro	Paulette Goto, Dan Langan, Ashley Gabrielsen	Multi-Layered Cake	Buddy Valastro

=== Season 25 ===
No.	#	Title	Original airdate	First round			Second round		
No.	#	Title	Original airdate	Guest(s)	Ingredient(s)	Contestants	Judges	Dish	Winner
298	1	"Ready, Set, Grill!"	May 24, 2020	Eddie Jackson, Danica Patrick	Swordfish	Jess DeSham Timmons, Leslie Roark Scott	Ronnie Woo, Tricia Williams, Joe Isidori	Barbecue Chicken Wings	Bobby Flay
299	2	"Summer Lovin'"	May 31, 2020	Carla Hall, Steve Higgins	Rhubarb	Kathy Sidell, Vinson Petrillo	Michele Ragussis, James Briscione, Hannah Wong	Lobster Rolls	Bobby Flay
300	3	"Gives You Goosebumps"	June 7, 2020	Scott Conant, Cheri Oteri	Gooseberries	Nick Walker, Senada Grbic	Michael Psilakis, Sara Moulton, Jeremy Salamon	Pork Chops and Applesauce	Bobby Flay
301	4	"Go Nuts!"	June 14, 2020	Ree Drummond, Eddie Jackson	Walnuts	Ian Rough, Anthony Endy	Hugh Mangum, Pati Jinich, Cliff Crooks	Steak Sandwich	Anthony Endy
302	5	"Superchef, Supermodel"	June 21, 2020	Anne Burrell, Gigi Hadid	Taro Root	Max Robbins, Melissa Araujo	Michael Psilakis, Tricia Williams, Joe Isidori	Falafel	Max Robbins
303	6	"Beat Bobby Flay: The Musical"	June 28, 2020	Damaris Phillips, Jaymee Sire	Capers	Elijah Milligan, Rémi Granger	David Massoni, Ariane Daguin, Michael Anthony	French Onion Soup	Rémi Granger
304	7	"So Much Shade"	July 5, 2020	Scott Conant, Vivica A. Fox	Baby Artichokes	Peter Prime, Nico Romo	Melba Wilson, Brian Duffy, Lucinda Scala Quinn	Chicken Cordon Bleu	Bobby Flay
305	8	"Fresh-Squeezed"	July 12, 2020	Amanda Freitag, Michael Symon	Pomelo	Carrie Eagle, Jose Salazar	Ivy Stark, Michael Psilakis, Pati Jinich	Pozole Verde with Seafood	Bobby Flay
306	9	"Somewhere Over The Rainbow"	July 19, 2020	Alex Guarnaschelli, Michael Voltaggio	Rainbow Carrots	Jennifer Dewasha, Devin Bozkaya	Michele Ragussis, Michael Gutowski, Melba Wilson	Crab Bisque	Bobby Flay
307	10	"It's All Gouda"	August 2, 2020	Anne Burrell, Michael Voltaggio	Gouda	José DeJesus, Dafna Mizrahi	Ken Oringer, Susan Feniger, Corby Kummer	Shrimp Burrito	José DeJesus
308	11	"Going Global"	August 9, 2020	Richard Blais, Laura Vitale	Celery Root	Reza Setayesh, Andy Gaynor	Daniel Breaker, Aliya LeeKong, Matt FX Feldman	Jianbing	Reza Setayesh
309	12	"You're Masa-Ing With Me!"	August 16, 2020	Jet Tila, Carla Hall	Fresh Masa	Dan Jacobs, Tony J. Nguyen	Tracy Jane Young, Dan Churchill, Helen Nguyen	Beef Chow Fun	Bobby Flay
310	13	"The Dynamic Duo"	August 23, 2020	Giada DeLaurentiis, Michael Symon	Bulgur Wheat	Fabrizio Schenardi, Jessica Gamble	David Massoni, Adrienne Cheatham, Michael Jenkins	Potato Gnocchi	Bobby Flay
311	14	"A Sticky Situation"	August 30, 2020	Alex Guarnaschelli, Geoffrey Zakarian	Brazil Nuts	Erica Land, Jacqueline Joy Diño	Zac Young, Toni Dickinson, Michael Tsang	Sticky Toffee Pudding	Bobby Flay
312	15	"Double Trouble"	September 6, 2020	Katie Lee, Heidi Gardner	Provolone	Iesha D. Williams & Nirva Llorca, Deanna Germano & Mark Germano	Joe Isidori, Anya Fernald, Cliff Crooks	Lumberjack Breakfast	Bobby Flay
313	16	"The Nightmare Before Pastry"	October 14, 2020	Katie Lee, Zac Young	Dragon Fruit	Michael McGowan, Kareem Queeman	Lauren Scala, Dan Langan, Deb Perelman	Bundt Cake	Bobby Flay
314	17	"All About That Baste"	November 1, 2020	Damaris Phillips, Casey Webb	Delicata Squash	Lindsay Porter, Kevin Grossi	Melba Wilson, Ryan Gleason, Elena Besser	Turkey Pot Pie	Bobby Flay

=== Season 26 ===
No.	#	Title	Original airdate	First round			Second round		
No.	#	Title	Original airdate	Guest(s)	Ingredient(s)	Contestants	Judges	Dish	Winner
315	1	"Mustache Takeover"	December 30, 2020	David Burtka, Donatella Arpaia	Chinese Long Beans	Saransh Oberoi, Tom Cuomo	Hari Nayak, Ayesha Nurdjaja, Shaun Hergatt	Kati Roll	Saransh Oberoi
316	2	"25 Ingredients or Less"	January 1, 2021	Giada De Laurentiis, Meredith Vieira	Coppa	Marcos Campos, Nicholas Poulmentis	Ivy Stark, Marc Vidal, Kristin Sollenne	Seafood Paella	Bobby Flay
317	3	"Don't Be Salty"	January 7, 2021	Geoffrey Zakarian, Sunny Anderson	'Nduja Sausage	Sammy Monsour, Whitney Thomas	Hugh Mangum, Melba Wilson, Jean-Paul Bourgeois	Hush Puppies	Bobby Flay
318	4	"Forecasting a Win"	January 14, 2021	Katie Lee, Al Roker	Quick Cooking Grits	Justin Walker, Marîa Grubb	Matt Abdoo, Georgette Farkas, Mason Hereford	Steak and Eggs	Bobby Flay
319	5	"How You Bean?"	January 21, 2021	Damaris Phillips, Sunny Anderson	White Navy Beans	Brian Lopes, Jesse Wykle	David Santos, Nicole Ponseca, Hugh Mangum	Lumpia	Jesse Wykle
320	6	"Blondes Have More Fun"	January 28, 2021	Anne Burrell, Sara Haines	Ground Bison	Jonathan Dearden, Scott Drewno	Chris Cheung, Sara Gore, Andrew Rea	Chicken Club Sandwich	Bobby Flay
321	7	"Friday Night Bites"	February 4, 2021	Sunny Anderson, Amanda Freitag	Mustard	Scott McDonald, Michael Buttacavoli	Laurent Tourondel, Tricia Williams, Ed McFarland	Meatball Parmesan Sandwich	Michael Buttacavoli
322	8	"Who's the Boss"	February 11, 2021	Amanda Freitag, Ben Rappaport	Saltine Crackers	Katie Renda, Richmond Flores	JJ Johnson, Michele Ragussis, Dale Talde	Clam Chowder	Katie Renda
323	9	"It's All Gravy"	February 18, 2021	Michael Symon, Ego Nwodim	Cheese Curds	Brandon Baltzley, Bill Crites	Lucinda Scala Quinn, John Seymour, Lauren Scala	Biscuits and Gravy	Bobby Flay
324	10	"Too Flay for Flay"	February 25, 2021	Sunny Anderson, Nicole Ari Parker	Turnip	Jenny Behm-Lazzarini, Julio Lazzarini	Drew Nieporent, Abigail Hitchcock, Marco Canora	Chicken Noodle Soup	Jenny Behm-Lazzarini
325	11	"Belly Up!"	March 4, 2021	Scott Conant, Claire Robinson	Pork Belly	Max Hosey, Ash Fulk	Matt FX, Tricia Williams, Dima Martseniuk	Spätzle	Bobby Flay
326	12	"If I Dip, You Dip, We Dip"	March 11, 2021	Josh Capon, Ana Gasteyer	Labneh	Danny Brown, Sarah Cloyd	Michael Lomonaco, Aliya LeeKong, Jacob Hadjigeorgis	French Dip Sandwich	Bobby Flay
327	13	"You Made Your Bread Now Eat It"	March 18, 2021	Michael Voltaggio, Jaymee Sire	Semolina Bread	Yehuda Sichel, Remy Pettus	Jake Dell, Kardea Brown, Andrew Friedman	Matzo Ball Soup	Yehuda Sichel
328	14	"Power Trip"	March 25, 2021	Michael Symon, Joseph Sikora	Quince	Ruth Wigman, Ian Rynecki	Georgette Farkas, Craig Samuel, Ariane Daguin	Moules-Frites	Bobby Flay

=== Season 27 ===
No.	#	Title	Original airdate	First round			Second round		
No.	#	Title	Original airdate	Guest(s)	Ingredient(s)	Contestants	Judges	Dish	Winner
329	1	"A Berry Crazy Night"	April 1, 2021	Anne Burrell, Eddie Jackson	Blackberry	Nokee Bucayu, Jay Reifel	Leah Cohen, Gareth Hughes, Sara Gore	Mince Pie	Jay Reifel
330	2	"Best in Snow"	April 8, 2021	Sunny Anderson, Christian Petroni	Pomegranates	Erick Harcey, Karyn Tomlinson	Michael Lomonaco, Melba Wilson, Dan Churchill	Swedish Meatballs	Bobby Flay
331	3	"Veggin' Out"	April 15, 2021	Katie Lee, Beth Stern	Cubanelle Peppers	Cara Nance, Destiny Aponte	Hugh Mangum, Einat Admony, Rich Landau	Vegetarian Chili	Bobby Flay
332	4	"Flirting with Victory"	April 22, 2021	Alex Guarnaschelli, Malin Akerman	Pork Loin	Andrew Bent, Alejandro Barrientos	Ivy Stark, Justin Bazdarich, Ariel Fox	Fish Tacos	Andrew Bent
333	5	"The Battle for Saratoga"	April 29, 2021	Scott Conant, Michelle Wie West	Longganisa Sausage	Jeannette Liebers, Chris Bonnivier	Melba Wilson, Michael Psilakis, Sarah Schneider	Pancakes	Bobby Flay
334	6	"That's A Lotta Ciabatta"	May 6, 2021	Scott Conant, Katie Brown	Ciabatta	Kerri Rogers, Joel Gargano	Marco Canora, Ayala Donchin, David Massoni	Garganelli	Bobby Flay
335	7	"Peas of Mind"	May 13, 2021	Michael Symon, Lela Loren	Snow Peas	Lien Lin, Hamidullah Noori	Jimmy Ly, Sami Zaman, Hugh Mangum	Beef Mantu	Bobby Flay
336	8	"Mission: Impastable"	May 20, 2021	Anne Burrell, Jaboukie Young-White	Asiago Cheese	David Benstock, Nicole Karr	Albert Di Meglio, Einat Admony, Clifford Crooks	Mezzelune	David Benstock
337	9	"Grin And Camembert It"	May 27, 2021	Valerie Bertinelli, Amanda Freitag	Camembert	Edward Brumfield, Ricardo Barreras	Louie Estrada, Nilou Motamed, Krzysztof Poluchowicz	Crab Cakes	Bobby Flay
338	10	"Rambutan Rumble"	June 3, 2021	Giada De Laurentiis, Marcus Samuelsson	Rambutan	Hiro Tarawa, Dannie Harrison	Nilou Motamed, Leah Cohen, Sakura Yagi	Pad Thai	Bobby Flay
339	11	"Let the Trumpet Sound!"	June 10, 2021	Sunny Anderson, Reid Scott (actor)	Black Trumpet Mushrooms	Sieger Bayer, Ned Baldwin	Georgette Farkas, Emma Bengtsson, Aliya LeeKong	Half-Roasted Chicken	Sieger Bayer
340	12	"Beets Me"	June 17, 2021	Michael Symon, Damaris Philips	Yellowtail	Andrew Lukovsky, Airis Johnson	Jeremy Salamon, Abigail Hitchcock, David Santos	Borscht	Bobby Flay
341	13	"Best Dressed in TV"	June 17, 2021	Geoffrey Zakarian, Carson Kressley	Cottage Cheese	Chris Coleman, Siddharth Krishna	Drew Nieporent, Ivy Stark, Chintan Pandya	Chicken and Rice Stew	Chris Coleman
342	14	"The Puck Stops Here"	June 24, 2021	Ted Allen, Wolfgang Puck	Cremini Mushrooms	Judy Anderson, Emily Hansen	Michael Lomonaco, Ariel Fox, Daniel Breaker	Steak Diane	Bobby Flay
343	15	"Kelly And The Jet"	June 24, 2021	Jet Tila, Clinton Kelly	Rabbit Loin	Rob Lam, Dawn Burrell	Ed Schoenfeld, Helen Nguyen, Dan Churchill	Beef Pho	Bobby Flay

=== Season 28 ===
No.	#	Title	Original airdate	First round			Second round		
No.	#	Title	Original airdate	Guest(s)	Ingredient(s)	Contestants	Judges	Dish	Winner
344	1	"Bobby and Chocolate Factory"	September 22, 2021	Alex Guarnaschelli, Elizabeth Chambers	Bittersweet Chocolate	Leann Mascoli, Melanie Moss	Toni Dickinson, Zachary Schmahl, Melissa Weller	Chocolate Éclair	Bobby Flay
345	2	"LA Takeover"	September 22, 2021	Michael Voltaggio, Ali Larter	Chicories	Yuri Szarzewski, Jorge González	Ariane Daguin, James Briscione, Lourdes Castro	Coquilles Saint-Jacques	Bobby Flay
346	3	"Hate To Burst Your Shark"	September 29, 2021	Ted Allen, Eddie Jackson	Nectarines	Phelix Gardner, Enrika Williams	Joe Isidori, Lauren Scala, Cliff Crooks	Chili Cheese Dog	Bobby Flay
347	4	"It's All Jackfruit To Me"	October 5, 2021	Alex Guarnaschelli, Casey Webb	Jackfruit	Jonathan Meyer, Fernanda Tapia	Lourdes Castro, Kardea Brown, Michele Ragussis	Johnnycake	Bobby Flay
348	5	"Romancing the Flay"	October 12, 2021	Michael Voltaggio, Jeff Mauro	Dried Cascabel Chili	Sayat Ozyilmaz, Laura Ozyilmaz	Justin Bazdarich, Sara Moulton, Corby Kummer	Fish a la Talla	Bobby Flay
349	6	"Last Man Grilling"	October 19, 2021	Josh Capon, Laura Vitale	Veal Porterhouse Chops	Mark Henry, Larry Delgado	Pati Jinich, Matt Abdoo, Katie Pickens	Carne asada	Larry Delgado
350	7	"Scallop Over The Finish Line"	October 26, 2021	Damaris Philips, John O'Hurley	Sea Scallop	Charlie Fuerte, Jonathan Brooks	Dan Churchill, Dana Cowin, Peter J. Kim	Fried Rice	Bobby Flay
351	8	"Don't Be Crabby"	November 2, 2021	Katie Lee, Eddie Jackson	Blue crab	Noel Cruz, Andrew Zarzosa	Dale Talde, Aliya LeeKong, Craig Samuel	Laksa	Bobby Flay
352	9	"A Family Affair"	November 9, 2021	Alex Guarnaschelli, Sophie Flay	Grouper	Nicole Gomes, Liam Beardslee	Ryan Fey, Angie Rito, Mark Anderson	Chicken Parmesan	Nicole Gomes
353	10	"Adios, Roberto Flay"	November 16, 2021	Anne Burrell, Damaris Phillips	Walleye	Ayaka Guido, Fabrizio Facchini	Richie Notar, Kristin Sollene, Albert Di Meglio	Egg Yolk Ravioli	Ayaka Guido
354	11	"It's a Cakewalk"	November 23, 2021	Duff Goldman, Damaris Phillips	Raspberry	Holden Jagger, Tova Du Plessis	Paulette Goto, Scott Levine, Jocelyn Delk Adams	Jewish apple cake	Tova Du Plessis
355	12	"All Tapped Out"	November 30, 2021	Buddy Valastro, Kathryn Tappen	Pistachio	Will Gustwiller, Lasheeda Perry	David Lebovitz, Raiza Costa, Bill Yosses	Lemon meringue pie	Lasheeda Perry
356	13	"High Prune"	December 7, 2021	Alex Guarnaschelli, Sunny Anderson	Prune	Kingshuk Dey, Godwin Ihentuge	Aarthi Sampath, JJ Johnson, Georgette Farkas	Mafé	Bobby Flay
357	14	"It's All Greek To Me"	December 14, 2021	Michael Symon, Carly Hughes	Butterfish	Georgios Kantaris, Angelo Vangelopoulos	Ayesha Nurdjaja, Richie Notar, Diane Kochilas	Moussaka	Bobby Flay
358	15	"It's All Business"	December 21, 2021	Anne Burrell, Michael Symon	New Mexico chile	Scott Calhoun, David Feola	Emma Bengtsson, Michael Lomonaco, Lauren Scala	Liver and onions	Scott Calhoun

=== Season 29 ===
No.	#	Title	Original airdate	First round			Second round		
No.	#	Title	Original airdate	Guest(s)	Ingredient(s)	Contestants	Judges	Dish	Winner
359	1	"Smoove Moves"	January 6, 2022	Michael Symon, J. B. Smoove	Kohlrabi	Mia Castro, Brandon Carter	James Briscione, Pamela Silvestri, Chris Cheung	Arroz con pollo	Mia Castro
360	2	"Say Yes To The Dish"	January 13, 2022	Randy Fenoli, Alex Guarnaschelli	Cauliflower	Ana Hernandez, Frank Bonanno	Rosanna Scotto, Albert Di Meglio, Lauren Scala	Lobster Fra Diavolo	Bobby Flay
361	3	"A Deal to Beat Bobby"	January 20, 2022	Mark Cuban, Sunny Anderson	Red Potatoes	Adyre Mason, Tamearra Dyson	Sara Gore, Justin Bazdarich, Tricia Williams	Vegan Burger	Tamearra Dyson
362	4	"Double the Trouble"	January 27, 2022	Michael Voltaggio, Bryan Voltaggio	Yellowfin Tuna	DeeDee Niyomkul, Juan Carlos Bazan	Drew Nieporent, Leah Cohen, David Santos	Tom kha kai	DeeDee Niyomkul
363	5	"Who's Wayne Is It Anyway"	February 3, 2022	Damaris Phillips, Wayne Brady	Corn	Steven Brooks, Becky Brown	Melba Wilson, Bryce Shuman, Lourdes Castro	Chicken fried steak	Bobby Flay
364	6	"Chocolate Showdown"	February 10, 2022	Alex Guarnaschelli, Duff Goldman	Cocoa Powder	Amber Croom, Emily Oyer	Paulette Goto, Thomas Raquel, Claudia Fleming	Sopa de chocolate	Bobby Flay
365	7	"Cliff and the Jet"	February 17, 2022	Jet Tila, Cliff Crooks	Catfish	Kimberly Gamble, Tom Berry	Leah Cohen, David Massoni, Ariane Daguin	Merda De Can	Tom Berry
366	8	"Girl Meets Flay"	February 24, 2022	Alex Guarnaschelli, Molly Yeh	D'Anjou Pear	Sam Fore, Jon Keeley	Nicole Friday, Bryce Shuman, Katie Pickens	Rabbit pie	Jon Keeley
367	9	"Let the Good Food Roll"	March 3, 2022	Anne Burrell, Andy Richter	Black Kale	Amy Mehrtens, Nathanial Zimet	Joe Isidori, Michele Ragussis, Justin Sutherland	Fried oyster Po’ boy	Bobby Flay
368	10	"Don't Be Nice"	March 10, 2022	D-Nice, Michael Symon	Guava	James Briscione, Sue Torres* (*did not finish)	Albert di Meglio, Ariel Fox, David Massoni	tortellini	James Briscione
369	11	"Fowl Shot"	March 17, 2022	Amar'e Stoudemire, Katie Lee	Ricotta	Michael O'Halloran, Alex Stickland	John Seymour, Abigail Hitchcock, Matt Abdoo	Smoked Duck	Michael O'Halloran
370	12	"Foodie Downer"	March 24, 2022	Rachel Dratch, Eddie Jackson	Canned Tomatoes	Dorian Hunter, Britt Rescigno	Justin Sutherland, Lucinda Scala Quinn, Dan Churchill	Chicken and Dumplings	Britt Rescigno
371	13	"Morena and the Marcona"	March 31, 2022	Morena Baccarin, Michael Voltaggio	Marcona Almonds	Cara Stadler, Raymond Yaptinchay	Tracy Jane Young, Chris Cheung, Tricia Williams	Mapo Tofu	Bobby Flay
372	14	"Bobby, Meet Me At the Griddle?"	April 7, 2022	Sunny Anderson, Maren Morris	Limes	Matthew Dolan, Thomas Kelly	Al Lanza, Ariel Fox, Ed McFarland	Lobster Tacos	Bobby Flay
373	15	"Fancy Pants"	April 14, 2022	Bethenny Frankel, Geoffrey Zakarian	Tofu	Chad Rosenthal, Brian Hill	Adrienne Cheatham, Michael Jenkins, Ayesha Nurdjaja	Fried Chicken	Chad Rosenthal
374	16	"Breakfast with Boswell"	April 14, 2022	Sunny Anderson, Stephanie Boswell	Amarena Cherries	Jenifer Minelli, Gabriella Baldwin	Michael Laiskonis, Georgette Farkas, Alain Allegretti	French Toast	Bobby Flay

=== Season 30 ===
No.	#	Title	Original airdate	First round			Second round		
No.	#	Title	Original airdate	Guest(s)	Ingredient(s)	Contestants	Judges	Dish	Winner
375	1	"Get in the Game"	April 27, 2022	Jaymee Sire, Jeff Mauro	Broccolini	Steven Lingenfelter, Laura Gonzalez	Matt FX, Ayesha Nurdjaja, Felipe Donnelly	Sopes	Bobby Flay
376	2	"You Braise Me Up"	May 12, 2022	Josh Groban, Alex Guarnaschelli	Carabinero Prawns	Thomas Youell, Diego Sanchez	Katie Pickens, Einat Admony, Martie Duncan	Grilled Branzino	Bobby Flay
377	3	"BBQ'd Revenge"	May 26, 2022	Carson Kressley, Brooke Williamson	Bison Ribeye Steak	Megan Day, David Sandusky	Matt Abdoo, Leah Wolfe, Craig Samuel	Grilled Tri-tip	David Sandusky
378	4	"It's Tila Time"	June 2, 2022	Jet Tila, Ali Tila	Miso	Ricky Dolinsky, Renata Ferraro	Chris Cheung, Lourdes Castro, Dima Martseniuk	Chawanmushi	Bobby Flay
379	5	"High Steaks"	June 9, 2022	Josh Capon, Anne Burrell	New York Strip steak	César Aldrete, Trisha Pérez Kennealy	Abigail Hitchcock, Justin Bazdarich, Dana Cowin	Pastel azteca	Bobby Flay
380	6	"Don't Oaxacaway from Me"	June 16, 2022	Brooke Williamson, Geoffrey Zakarian	Oaxaca cheese	Noah Zamler, Aerin Zavory	Ali Rosen, Hugh Mangum, Melba Wilson	Lamb Chops	Aerin Zavory
381	7	"British Invasion"	June 23, 2022	Brooklyn Beckham, Sunny Anderson	Apple	Caroline Budge, Francis Legge	Ben Ford, Susan Povich, Robert Aikens	Fish and chips with Mushy Peas	Francis Legge
382	8	"In Bobby's Kitchen, with Amy"	June 30, 2022	Amy Sedaris, Michael Symon	Chorizo	Kristin Beringson, Amanda Salas	James Briscione, Ali Rosen, Jason Birchard	Beef Stroganoff	Amanda Salas
383	9	"A is for Aasif, Alex, Ambush!"	June 30, 2022	Aasif Mandvi, Alex Guarnaschelli	Dried Apricot	Surbhi Sahni, Diane Lam	Adrienne Cheatham, Jehangir Mehta, Helen Nguyen	Gushtaba	Surbhi Sahni
384	10	"You're So Buteau-ful"	July 7, 2022	Michelle Buteau, Michael Voltaggio	Coconut	Zev Bennett, Petrina Peart	Hari Nayak, Aliya LeeKong, Akhtar Nawab	Goat curry	Bobby Flay
385	11	"Smoove Operator'	July 7, 2022	JB Smoove, Damaris Phillips	Bok choy	Cecilia Valencia, Christian Gill	Brian Duffy, Leah Cohen, Corby Kummer	Banh mi	Christian Gill
386	12	"Watch the Throne"	July 14, 2022	Tiffani Faison, Jeff Mauro	Jamon iberico	Roosevelt Caesar, Natalia Santos	David Santos, Ariel Fox, James Gonzalez	Pastelon	Roosevelt Caesar
387	13	"Food, But Make It Fashion"	July 14, 2022	Sunny Anderson, Carson Kressley	Duck Breast	Eli Dunn, Kim Mills	Ana Calderone, Felipe Donnelly, Lourdes Castro	Corn Soup	Bobby Flay
388	14	"Hale to the Chefs"	July 21, 2022	Tony Hale, Amanda Freitag	Israeli couscous	Cristian Rebolledo, Matt Migliore	Ed Brown, Adrienne Cheatham, Jeremy Salamon	Grilled Octopus	Matt Migliore
389	15	"Alex, Eric & America vs Bobby"	July 28, 2022	Alex Guarnaschelli, Eric Adjepong	Pork Porterhouse	Tara Monsod, Tomas Chavarria	Dale Talde, Nicole Ponseca, Anton Dayrit	Chicken Adobo	Bobby Flay

=== Season 31 ===
No.	#	Title	Original airdate	First round			Second round		
No.	#	Title	Original airdate	Guest(s)	Ingredient(s)	Contestants	Judges	Dish	Winner
390	1	"Smack Talk City"	August 4, 2022	Eddie Jackson, Buddy Valastro	Fresh Squid	Andrew McQuesten, Jarod Farina	Michael Psilakis, Helen Nguyen, Matt FX	Congee	Bobby Flay
391	2	"Just "Dill" With It"	August 11, 2022	Alex Guarnaschelli, Jeff Mauro	Persian Cucumbers	Kathy Fang Natascha Hess	Chris Cheung, Tricia Williams, Josh Grinker	Red braised pork belly	Bobby Flay
392	3	"New Phone, Who Dis"	August 18, 2022	Katie Lee Biegel, David Burtka	Buttermilk	Lambert Givens, Jesse Houston	Chris Scott, Melba Wilson, Craig Samuel	Gumbo	Lambert Givens
393	4	"A Global Gauntlet"	August 25, 2022	Anne Burrell, Marc Murphy	Chickpea	Ashten Garrett, Nasser Jaber	Georgette Farkas, David Santos, Jumana Bishara	Maqluba	Bobby Flay
394	5	"Bobby's Besties"	September 1, 2022	Tanya Holland, Alex Guarnaschelli	Pancetta	Cam Waron, Quincy Randolph	Craig Samuel, Mama Tanya, John Seymour	Chicken and Waffles	Bobby Flay
395	6	"Talk the Shiitake"	September 8, 2022	Esther Choi, Michael Symon	Shiitake Mushrooms	Saif Rahman, Carolina Gomez	Sue Torres, Chintan Pandya, Michele Ragussis	Cazuela de mariscos	Bobby Flay
396	7	"Kitchen Update"	September 15, 2022	Carla Hall, Colin Jost	Sour Orange	Katsuji Tanabe, Jo Proul	Luis Arce Mota, Ariel Fox, Felipe Donnelly	Mission burrito	Bobby Flay

=== Season 32 ===
No.	#	Title	Original airdate	First round			Second round		Third round			
No.	#	Title	Original airdate	Guest	Ingredient	Contestants	Ingredient	Contestants	Teams	Judges	Dish	Winners
397	1	"Holiday Throwdown – Casserole"	November 8, 2022	Scott Conant	Pearl Onions	Tiffani Faison, Jet Tila	Sour Cream	Jet Tila, Anne Burrell	Anne Burrell and Tiffani Faison, Bobby Flay and Jet Tila	Chris Scott, Aliya LeeKong, Michael Lomonaco	Ham and Cheese Casserole	Bobby Flay and Jet Tila
398	2	"Holiday Throwdown – Stuff It!"	November 15, 2022	Eddie Jackson	Turkey Sausage	Michael Psilakis, Christian Petroni	Pheasant	Christian Petroni, Maneet Chauhan	Maneet Chauhan and Christian Petroni, Bobby Flay and Michael Psilakis	Hugh Mangum, Angie Rito, David Massoni	Stuffed Turkey	Bobby Flay and Michael Psilakis
399	3	"Holiday Throwdown – Hard Dishes"	November 22, 2022	Giada De Laurentiis	Goose Eggs	Tiffany Derry, Brooke Williamson	Escargot	Brooke Williamson, Michael Voltaggio	Brooke Williamson and Michael Voltaggio, Bobby Flay and Tiffany Derry	Ayesha Nurdjaja, Michael Jenkins, Emma Bengtsson	Cheese Soufflé	Bobby Flay and Tiffany Derry
400	4	"Holiday Throwdown – For Dessert"	November 29, 2022	Carla Hall	Eggnog	Zac Young, Damaris Phillips	Panettone	Zac Young, Alex Guarnaschelli	Zac Young and Alex Guarnaschelli, Bobby Flay and Damaris Phillips	Raiza Costa, Dan Langan, Samantha Seneviratne	Yule log (cake)	Bobby Flay and Damaris Phillips
401	5	"Holiday Throwdown – Throwbacks"	December 6, 2022	Carson Kressley	Pomegranate Molasses	Einat Admony, Amanda Freitag	Spiral Ham	Amanda Freitag, Michael Symon	Michael Symon and Amanda Freitag, Bobby Flay and Einat Admony	Lucinda Scala Quinn, Lauren Scala, Abigail Hitchcock	Duck à l'orange	Bobby Flay and Einat Admony
402	6	"Holiday Throwdown – The World"	December 13, 2022	Geoffrey Zakarian	Black Mission Figs	Esther Choi, Leah Cohen	Pickled Herring	Esther Choi, Eric Adjepong	Esther Choi and Leah Cohen, Bobby Flay	Nicole Ponseca, Jae Lee, Adrienne Cheatham	Chuseok Food	Esther Choi and Leah Cohen
403	7	"Bobby, We Need To Talk"	March 2, 2023	Eddie Jackson, Natalie Morales	Corn tortilla	Sedesh Boodram, Tim Kuklinski				Harold Moore, Melba Wilson, Ed Cotton	Scotch egg	Bobby Flay
404	8	"Don't Be Sour!"	March 9, 2023	Ted Allen, Sara Haines	Lemon	Grace Goudie, Andy Xu				Susan Povich, Matt FX, Tricia Williams	Croque Madame	Bobby Flay
405	9	"Drop It Like It's Hot"	March 23, 2023	Brooke Williamson, Maneet Chauhan	Ground turkey	Rasheeda Purdie, Jocelyn Law-Yone				Sakura Yagi, Cobi Levy, Leah Cohen	Mohinga	Jocelyn Law-Yone
406	10	"Kitchen Crime Scene"	April 6, 2023	Scott Conant, Angie Harmon	Escarole	Adrien Blech, Crystal Wahpepah				Helen Nguyen, Akhtar Nawab, Nikki Dinki	Bánh xèo	Adrien Blech
407	11	"Under the Tuscan Sun"	April 13, 2023	Anne Burrell, Kalen Allen	Porcini	Angelo Competiello, Paolo Calamai				Frank Prisinzano, Karen Akunowicz, Albert DiMeglio	Wild Boar Ragu	Angelo Competiello
408	12	"The Room Where It Happens"	April 20, 2023	Christopher Jackson, Josh Capon	Daikon	Kyle McClelland, Edwin Bayone				Sohui Kim, Michael Psilakis, Lamara Davidson	Korean Fried Chicken Sandwich	Edwin Bayone
409	13	"In Perfect Hominy"	April 27, 2023	Jaymee Sire, Andrew Zimmern	Hominy	Byron Gomez, Sebastien Salomon				Wesley Jean Simon, Georgette Farkas, Drew Nieporent	Griot	Bobby Flay
410	14	"Happy Feet"	May 4, 2023	Damaris Phillips, Scott Conant	French Baguette	Hari Pulapaka, Denis Radovic				Lauren Scala, Peter J Kim, Ayesha Nurdjaja	Chicken Scarpariello	Bobby Flay
411	15	"This Is How We (Kati) Roll"	May 11, 2023	Christian Petroni, Sunny Hostin	Dorade	Romain Paumier, Avishar Barua				Jimmy Rizvi, Rita Jammet, Michael Jenkins	Kati roll	Avishar Barua
412	16	"Bouillabaisse-ic Instinct"	May 18, 2023	Jet Tila, Sunny Anderson	Great Northern Beans	Camila Rinaldi, Dan Jackson				Marco Moreira, Ariane Daguin, Alain Allegretti	Bouillabaisse	Bobby Flay
413	17	"Glaser-Focused"	May 25, 2023	Michael Voltaggio, Nikki Glaser	Beets	Troy Gardner, Rachel Klein				Rich Landau, Nikki Dinki, Chris Cheung	Vegan Cheese Steaks	Rachel Klein

=== Season 33 ===
No.	#	Title	Original airdate	First round			Second round		
No.	#	Title	Original airdate	Guest(s)	Ingredient(s)	Contestants	Judges	Dish	Winner
414	1	"A-Team Assemble!"	June 1, 2023	Anne Burrell, Alex Guarnaschelli	Tilefish	Alison Settle, Kevin Scharpf	Elena Besser, Jason Birchard, Karen Akunowicz	Mushroom Stroganoff	Bobby Flay
415	2	"Make It Work"	June 8, 2023	Tim Gunn, Carla Hall	Smoked Mozzarella	Rocco Carulli, Craig Richards	Lourdes Castro, Albert Di Meglio, Abigail Hitchcock	Mushroom Risotto	Bobby Flay
416	3	"Who's Your Mac Daddy?"	June 15, 2023	Sophie Flay, Eddie Jackson	Black sea bass	Hari Cameron, Leilani Baugh	Chris Scott, Melba Wilson, Jacob Hadjigeorgis	Macaroni and cheese	Bobby Flay
417	4	"MMMMBibimbap"	June 22, 2023	Jet Tila, Tiffany Derry	Soft-shell clam	Chrissy Camba, Johnny Clark	Wilson Tang, Leah Cohen, Jae Lee	Bibimbap	Johnny Clark
418	5	"Another Flay in The Office"	June 29, 2023	Kate Flannery, Christian Petroni	Rack of Venison	Josh Gale, Christian Ortiz	David Santos, Rosanna Scotto, Cesare Casella	Cappellacci	Josh Gale
419	6	"The Win Beneath Their Wings"	July 6, 2023	Kardea Brown, Carson Kressley	Top Sirloin Cap	Rashad Jones, Kent Rollins	Robbie Shoults, Mama Tanya, Hugh Mangum	Barbecue Chicken Wings	Rashad Jones
420	7	"The Bald and the Beautiful"	July 13, 2023	Michael Symon, Devon Windsor	Hazelnut	Santiago Guzzetti, Dom Crisp	Ed Brown, Karen Akunowicz, Sal Coppola	Seafood Cannelloni	Bobby Flay
421	8	"Ready for Their Close Up"	July 20, 2023	Geoffrey Zakarian, Ashley Graham	Couscous	Maiya Keck, Brian Cripps	Nasim Alikhani, Michael Jenkins, Michele Ragussis	Lamb Kofta	Bobby Flay
422	9	"Bottoms Up, Bobby Down!"	July 27, 2023	Katie Lee Biegel, Aisha Tyler	Japanese Mountain Yam	Jeff Potts, Brittney Williams	Leticia Skai Young, Preston Clark, Hong Thaimee	Jerk Snapper	Bobby Flay
423	10	"Turn Down for What?!?"	August 3, 2023	Anne Burrell, Lil John	Queso blanco	Eva Pesantez, Robert Butts	Lucinda Scala Quinn, Chris Scott, Aliya LeeKong	Meatloaf	Bobby Flay
424	11	"A "Matcha" Made in Heaven"	August 10, 2023	Stephanie Boswell, Anika Noni Rose	Matcha	Yara Lamers, Lindsay Farr	Melissa Weller, Dan Langan, Ashley Gabrielsen	Carrot cake	Lindsay Farr
425	12	"Shock, Awe and Shakshuka"	August 17, 2023	Ellie Kemper, Michael Voltaggio	Poblano	Travis McGinty, Suzanne Vizethann	Brian Duffy, Aliya LeeKong, David Massoni	Shakshouka	Bobby Flay
426	13	"Nashville Hot, Bobby ... Not"	August 24, 2023	Martina McBride, Alex Guarnaschelli	Robiola	Drew Erickson, Aristide Williams	Mama Tanya, Bruce Bromberg, Martie Duncan	Eggs Benedict	Bobby Flay
427	14	"This Kitchen's Crowded"	August 31, 2023	Kevin Pollak, Kardea Brown	Plantain	Carlos Anthony, Nelson German	Felipe Donnelly, Martie Duncan, Akhtar Nawab	Stuffed peppers	Bobby Flay
428	15	"Cheri Takes The Cake"	September 7, 2023	Cheri Oteri, Zac Young	Tahini	Laura Ochikubo, Joe Murphy	Raiza Costa, Dan Langan, Paulette Goto	Brooklyn Blackout cake	Joe Murphy
429	16	"Brooke and Crooks Cook Up a Win"	September 14, 2023	Brooke Williamson, Cliff Crooks	Castelvetrano Olives	Javier Canteras, Emiliano Marentes	Lourdes Castro, David Santos, Ariel Fox	Tortilla Espanola	Javier Canteras
430	17	"Cat Fight"	September 21, 2023	Gabourey Sidibe, Damaris Phillips	Dungeness crab	Sean Pharr, Malik Rhasaan	Frank Prisinzano, Michele Ragussis, Danny Lee	Salmon Cakes	Bobby Flay
431	18	"Fashion-Forward"	September 25, 2023	Amanda Freitag, Carson Kressley	Halibut	Maria Mazon, Guillermo Pernot	Roberto Santibañez, Ariel Fox, Louie Estrada	Cuban sandwich	Bobby Flay
432	19	"Full Frontal Assault"	October 5, 2023	Samantha Bee, Michael Symon	Chicken Breast	Johnny Alvarez, Stanton Bundy	Katie Pickens, Corby Kummer, Abigail Hitchcock	Chilaquiles	Stanton Bundy
433	20	"Why So Sear-ious?"	October 12, 2023	Carson Kressley, Rodney Scott	Flank steak	Winnie Yee-Lakhani, Kwasi Kwaa	Matt Abdoo, Lois Duncan, Salil Mehta	Chicken Satay	Bobby Flay
434	21	"It's Always Sunny in Kashmir"	October 19, 2023	Scott Conant, Sunny Anderson	Pine nut	Maryam Ghaznavi, Deepak Kaul	Ayesha Nurdjaja, Jehangir Mehta, Mary Attea	Lamb Rogan Josh	Bobby Flay
435	22	"What a Dump-ling!"	October 26, 2023	Anne Burrell, Eddie Jackson	White Asparagus	Jessica Yarr, Matthew Zafrir	Jake Dell, Katie Pickens, Jason Birchard	Pierogi	Bobby Flay

=== Season 34 ===
No.	#	Title	Original airdate	First round			Second round		Third round			
No.	#	Title	Original airdate	Guest	Ingredient	Contestants	Ingredient	Contestants	Teams	Judges	Dish	Winners
436	1	"Holiday Throwdown: Turkey Day Traditions"	November 7, 2023	Katie Lee Biegel	Cornbread	Darnell Ferguson, Bryan Voltaggio	Butternut squash	Michael Voltaggio, Bryan Voltaggio	Michael Voltaggio & Bryan Voltaggio, Bobby Flay & Darnell Ferguson	Melba Wilson, Alfred Portale, Angie Rito	Turkey Tetrazzini	Michael Voltaggio and Bryan Voltaggio
437	2	"Holiday Throwdown: Holiday Leftover Revival"	November 14, 2023	Tiffani Faison	Roasted Brussels Sprouts	Amanda Freitag, Marc Murphy	Cooked Turkey Legs	Scott Conant, Amanda Freitag	Amanda Freitag & Scott Conant, Bobby Flay & Marc Murphy	Mama Tanya, Dino Gatto, Michele Ragussis	Leftover Stuffing Stuffed Lobster Tail	Amanda Freitag and Scott Conant
438	3	"Holiday Throwdown: 12 Ways to Beat Bobby"	November 21, 2023	Carson Kressley	Pear	Chris Scott, Justin Sutherland	Partridge	Tiffany Derry, Chris Scott	Tiffany Derry & Justin Sutherland, Bobby Flay & Chris Scott	Albert DiMeglio, Lourdes Castro, Michael Lomonaco	Peri Peri Poussin	Bobby Flay and Chris Scott
439	4	"Holiday Throwdown: Holiday Brunchin'"	November 28, 2023	Sophie Flay	Coquito	Eddie Jackson, Zac Young	Smoked salmon	Maneet Chauhan, Zac Young	Maneet Chauhan & Zac Young, Bobby Flay & Eddie Jackson	Leah Cohen, Hari Nayak, Adrienne Cheatham	Egg Vindaloo	Maneet Chauhan and Zac Young
440	5	"Holiday Throwdown: Feeling Frosted	December 5, 2023	Sunny Anderson	Mexican Hot Chocolate	Stephanie Izard, Damaris Phillips	Gingerbread	Duff Goldman, Damaris Phillips	Damaris Phillips & Duff Goldman, Bobby Flay & Stephane Izard	Dana Cowin, Paulette Goto, Deb Perelman	Chocolate Orange Christmas Bundt	Bobby Flay and Stephanie Izard
441	6	"Holiday Throwdown: Feast of the Seven Fishes"	December 12, 2023	Alex Guarnaschelli	Squid Ink	Christian Petroni, Antonia Lofaso	Branzino	Michael Symon, Antonia Lofaso	Bobby Flay & Christian Petroni, Antonia Lofaso & Michael Symon	Marco Canora, Michael Jenkins, Frank Prisinzano	Seafood Fra Diavolo	Antonia Lofaso and Michael Symon
442	7	"Holiday Throwdown: Time to Celebrate!"	December 19, 2023	Jeff Mauro	Caviar	Jet Tila, Brooke Williamson	Prime Rib	Andrew Zimmern, Brooke Williamson	Andrew Zimmern & Brooke Williamson, Bobby Flay & Jet Tila	Chris Cheung, Aliya LeeKong, Jake Dell	Hanukkah Feast	Bobby Flay and Jet Tila

=== Season 35 ===
No.	#	Title	Original airdate	First round			Second round		
No.	#	Title	Original airdate	Guest(s)	Ingredient(s)	Contestants	Judges	Dish	Winner
443	1	"The (Steak) Oscar Goes to..."	February 29, 2024	Sunny Anderson, Geoffrey Zakarian	English Peas	Paddy Coker, Greg Lutes	Michael Jenkins, Georgette Farkas, David Massoni	Steak Oscar	Bobby Flay
444	2	"Tall, Dark and Handsome"	March 7, 2024	Scott Conant, Eric Adjepong	Jicama	Dane Blom, Emme Riberio Collins	Michael Jenkins, Fariyal Abdullahi, Henrique Stangorlini	Moqueca	Emme Riberio Collins
445	3	"Mentor vs. Mentee"	March 14, 2024	Michael Voltaggio, Damaris Phillips	Black Soybeans	Marc Quińones, Bryan Romero	Derick Lopez, Ariel Fox, Alain Allegretti	Shrimp Tostones	Bobby Flay
446	4	"Don't Yuck My Yum"	March 21, 2024	Sunny Anderson, Ross Mathews	Dandelion Greens	Kaleena Bliss, Melissa Donahue	Valentine Thomas, Jeremy Salamon, Skai Young	Seafood Boil	Kaleena Bliss
447	5	"On a Roll!"	March 28, 2024	Eddie Jackson, Maneet Chauhan	Loin of Lamb	Bernar Bennett, Lena Le	Daniel Breaker, Susan Feniger, Wesley Jean Simon	Spring roll	Bobby Flay
448	6	"JUDGEment Day"	April 4, 2024	Brooke Williamson, Matt Walsh	Egg	Ariel Fox, Jae Lee	Justin Bazdarich, Jae Jung, David Santos	Burger	Bobby Flay
449	7	"Raise the Steaks"	April 11, 2024	Michael Symon, Chris Redd	Red onion	Adam Pawlak, Page Pressley	Lauren Scala, Michael Psilakis, Michele Ragussis	Steak and Potatoes	Bobby Flay
450	8	"Tame the Lion's Mane"	April 18, 2024	Christian Petroni, Michael Voltaggio	Lion's mane mushroom	Lanny Chin, Wendy Zeng	Wilson Tang, Mary Sue Milliken, Chris Cheung	Yúxiāngqiézi	Bobby Flay
451	9	"A Bitter Pill to Swallow"	April 25, 2024	Katie Lee Biegel, Alex Guarnaschelli	Bitter melon	Kyungbin Min, Alex Ottusch	Marja Vongerichten, Chung Chow, Aliya LeeKong	Bulgogi ssam	Bobby Flay
452	10	"Shrimply the Best"	May 3, 2024	Scott Conant, Jana Kramer	Rock shrimp	Sterling Buckley, Tony Smith	Joe Sasto, Angie Rito, Jimmy Ventura	Chicken Piccata	Bobby Flay
453	11	"Sweet Defeat"	May 9, 2024	Duff Goldman, Alyson Hannigan	Pistachio	Jewel Johnson, Katherine Sprung	Camari Mick, Joe Sasto, Paulette Goto	Tiramisu	Jewel Johnson
454	12	"Ciao Ciao, Bobby"	May 16, 2024	Alex Guarnaschelli, Gabriele Bertaccini	Mortadella	Jackson Kalb, Rachelle Murphy	Rosanna Scotto, Laurent Tourondel, Karen Akunowicz	Cappelletti	Rachelle Murphy
455	13	"All-Star Showdown"	May 23, 2024	Carla Hall, Ana Navarro	Smoked Trout	Shirley Chung, Tim Hollingsworth	Chris Scott, Sara Gore, Chris Cheung	Roast Chicken	Tim Hollingsworth
456	14	"Anchor's Aweigh"	May 30, 2024	Eddie Jackson, Poppy Harlow	Flat iron steak	Dayna Lee, Enrique Lozano	Melba Wilson, Akhtar Nawab, Katie Pickens	Chile Colorado	Bobby Flay

=== Season 36 ===
No.	#	Title	Original airdate	First round			Second round		
No.	#	Title	Original airdate	Guest(s)	Ingredient(s)	Contestants	Judges	Dish	Winner
457	1	"No Flay at the Beach"	June 6, 2024	Jet Tila, Jesse Palmer	Champagne Mango	Pablo Lamon, Demetrius Brown	James Gonzales, Skai Young, George Mendes	Jamaican Beef Patties	Demetrius Brown
458	2	"Bring on the Brits!"	June 13, 2024	Michael Symon, Robert Herjavec	Fresh cod	Poppy O'Toole, Joel Childs	Jason Hicks, Elena Besser, Paul Liebrandt	Bangers and Mash	Bobby Flay
459	3	"Dance, Dance Revolution"	June 20, 2024	Carla Hall, Allison Holker	Maple Syrup	Kimberly Plafke, Tiana Gee	Nicole Ponseca, Ronnie Woo, Sarah Schneider	Sinigang	Bobby Flay
460	4	"Say What?!"	June 27, 2024	Ted Allen, Tiffani Faison	Wonton Wrappers	Jim Armstrong, Earl James Reynolds	Shin Takagi, Kazuko Nagao, Matt FX	Okonomiyaki	Earl James Reynolds
461	5	"Broadway Bound!"	July 11, 2024	Jet Tila, Sutton Foster	Gianduja	Kaitlin Guerin, Laura Warren	Dan Langan, Camari Mick, Michael Laiskonis	Chocolate tart	Bobby Flay
462	6	"News You Can Use"	July 18, 2024	Geoffrey Zakarian, Kate Bolduan	Gruyère cheese	Zach Roth, Milena Pagán	Jonathan Waxman, Leah Cohen, James Gonzalez	Lobster Mofongo	Bobby Flay
463	7	"Loud and Proud"	July 25, 2024	Antonia Lofaso, Leslie Jones	Peanut	Josh Elliott, Vicky Colas	Lauren Scala, Wesley Jean Simon, Jasmine Gerald	Jerk Chicken	Josh Elliott
464	8	"Breakfast of Champions"	August 1, 2024	Duff Goldman, Gayle King	Cara cara navel	Brian Ingram, Dayana Joseph	Joe Sasto, Mama Tanya, James Briscione	Pancake	Bobby Flay
465	9	"The "Thai" That Binds"	August 8, 2024	Sunny Anderson, Jenna Elfman	Guineafowl	Francisco Higareda, Chris Dodson	Leah Cohen, Tino Feliciano, Lourdes Castro	Green curry	Bobby Flay
466	10	"Red Carpet Ready"	August 15, 2024	Carson Kressley, Katie Lee	Mahi-mahi	Rob Reinsmith, Manny Barella	T. J. Steele, Lucinda Scala Quinn, James Gonzalez	Corn Empanadas	Rob Reinsmith
467	11	"This is... Competition"	August 22, 2024	Michael Symon, Chrissy Metz	Genoa salami	Loic Sany, Taylor Haupt	Melba Wilson, Andrew Riccatelli, Karen Akunowicz	Bolognese sauce	Bobby Flay
468	12	"Game Day Grapple"	August 29, 2024	Eddie Jackson, Ian Rapoport	Chicken Wings	Natalie Blake, Nick Shipp	Brian Duffy, Katie Pickens, Hugh Mangum	Cheesesteak	Bobby Flay
469	13	"Talk the Talk, Walk the Walk"	September 12, 2024	Amanda Kloots, Jet Tila	Dried cherries	Nikolaos Kaperneros, Monique Feybesse	Jason Birchard, Jess Tom, Peter Giannakas	Moussaka	Nikolaos Kaperneros

=== Season 37 ===
No.	#	Title	Original airdate	First round			Second round		Third round			
No.	#	Title	Original airdate	Guest	Ingredient	Contestants	Ingredient	Contestants	Teams	Judges	Dish	Winners
470	1	"Holiday Throwdown: Bird is Not the Word"	November 12, 2024	Eddie Jackson	Cranberry	Adrienne Cheatham, Christian Petroni	Potato	Michael Voltaggio, Adrienne Cheatham	Michael Voltaggio & Christian Petroni, Bobby Flay & Adrienne Cheatham	Drew Nieporent, Aliya LeeKong, Craig Samuel	Stuffing	Bobby Flay and Adrienne Cheatham
471	2	"Holiday Throwdown: Pie in the Sky"	November 19, 2024	Ina Garten	Pecan	Amanda Freitag, Aarti Sequeira	Canned Pumpkin	Duff Goldman, Amanda Freitag	Amanda Freitag & Duff Goldman, Bobby Flay & Aarti Sequeira	Mama Tanya, Michael Psilakis, Paulette Goto	Shepherd's pie, and Pumpkin pie	Bobby Flay and Aarti Sequeira
472	3	"Holiday Throwdown: Magic of the Holidays"	November 26, 2024	Carson Kressley	Persimmon	Tiffani Faison, Tiffany Derry	Whole Turkey	Scott Conant, Tiffany Derry	Tiffany Derry & Tiffani Faison, Bobby Flay & Scott Conant	Ayesha Nurdjaja, Melba Wilson, Michele Ragussis	Smothered Okra	Bobby Flay and Scott Conant
473	4	"Holiday Throwdown: Global Holiday Markets"	December 3, 2024	Sunny Anderson	Raclette	Gabe Bertaccini, Marcus Samuelsson	Bratwurst	Maneet Chauhan, Gabe Bertaccini	Maneete Chauhan & Marcus Samuelsson, Bobby Flay & Gabe Bertaccini	Jonathan Waxman, Emma Bengtsson, Chintan Pandya	Samosa	Bobby Flay and Gabe Bertaccini
474	5	"Holiday Throwdown: Roasted and Toasted"	December 10, 2024	Michael Symon	Chestnut	Jet Tila, Antonia Lofaso	Suckling pig	Geoffrey Zakarian, Antonio Lofaso	Geoffrey Zakarian & Antonia Lofaso, Bobby Flay & Jet Tila	Corby Kummer, Leah Cohen, Chris Cheung	Rack of lamb with Brussels sprouts	Bobby Flay and Jet Tila
475	6	"Holiday Throwdown: Happy New Year"	December 17, 2024	Jeff Mauro	Black-eyed pea	Damaris Phillips, Eric Adjepong	Alaskan King Crab	Brooke Williamson, Eric Adjepong	Brooke Williamson & Damaris Phillips, Bobby Flay & Eric Adjepong	Michael Jenkins, Lorna Maseko, Ed McFarland	Surf and Turf	Bobby Flay and Eric Adjepong

=== Season 38 ===
No.	#	Title	Original airdate	First round			Second round		
No.	#	Title	Original airdate	Guest(s)	Ingredient(s)	Contestants	Judges	Dish	Winner
476	1	"Chopped Takedown"	December 26, 2024	Alex Guarnaschelli, Marc Murphy	Artichoke	Daniel Le, Michael Michaelidis	Ed McFarland, Sakura Yagi, Gabriel Kreuther	Lobster Thermidor	Bobby Flay
477	2	"From Plies to Plating"	January 16, 2025	Andrew Zimmern, Misty Copeland	Arctic char	Tristen Epps, Vinnie Cimino	Kwame Williams, Nikki Dinki, Jeremy Salamon	Trinidadian Stew Chicken	Tristen Epps
478	3	"No More Mr. Nice Pie"	January 23, 2025	Carson Kressley, Alex Guarnaschelli	Naan	Kyle Garry, Sam Bassett	Michael Psilakis, Elena Besser, Drew Nieporent	Shepherd's pie	Bobby Flay
479	4	"Celebrate Good Times!"	January 30, 2025	Maneet Chauhan, Jaymee Sire	Pineapple	Victoria Elizondo, Tajahi Cooke	Christian Gill, Susan Feniger, Kwame Williams	Tikin Xic	Bobby Flay
480	5	"Attention!"	February 6, 2025	Sunny Anderson, Sage Steele	Piquillo pepper	Star Maye, Marie Yniguez	Chris Scott, Abigail Hitchcock, David Santos	New Mexico-style enchiladas	Bobby Flay
481	6	"How About a Rematch?"	February 13, 2025	Ted Allen, Lauren Scala	Romanesco broccoli	Emily Oyer, Dan Jacobs	Marco Canora, Lauryn Bodden, Albert Di Meglio	Gnudi	Emily Oyer
482	7	"Close but No Cigar"	February 20, 2025	Brooke Williamson, Tiffany Derry	Chayote	Kathy Fang, Nate Appelman	Helen Nguyen, Albert Di Meglio, Aliya LeeKong	Lasagna	Bobby Flay
483	8	"Risk It for the Biscuit"	February 27, 2025	Josh Capon, Lil Rel Howery	Roquefort cheese	Declan Horgan, Melvin "Boots" Johnson	Jennifer Prezioso, Michael Lomonaco, Mama Tanya	Biscuits and Gravy	Melvin "Boots" Johnson
484	9	"Ciao, Bella!"	March 6, 2025	Scott Conant, Madison Bailey	Ricotta Salata	Corey Becker, Preston Paine	Marco Camorra, Shirley Chung, Joey Campanaro	Agnolotti	Bobby Flay
485	10	"Oh, the Pasta-bilities!"	March 13, 2025	Antonia Lofaso, Jay Pharoah	Florida stone crab	Sasha Grumman, Zach Chancey	James Briscione, Ayesha Nurdjaja, Albert Di Meglio	Pasta Carbonara	Bobby Flay
486	11	"The Big Easy"	April 3, 2025	Sunny Anderson, Punkie Johnson	Andouille	Chris Vazquez, Eric Cook	Wesley Jean Simon, Jae Jung, Rafael Hasid	Crawfish Étouffeé	Bobby Flay
487	12	"Young Guns"	April 10, 2025	Katie Lee Biegel, Nicholas Braun	Brioche	Hanna Haar, Peter McQuaid	Elena Besser, Michael Jenkins, Britt Rescigno	Lobster Risotto	Hanna Haar
488	13	"BFFs vs. Bobby"	April 17, 2025	Carla Hall, Tiffany Derry	Haricot vert	Chris Sanchez, Pam Liberda	TJ Steele, Ariel Fox, Max Wittawat	Chicken Khao soi	Bobby Flay

=== Season 39 ===
No.	#	Title	Original airdate	First round			Second round		
No.	#	Title	Original airdate	Guest(s)	Ingredient(s)	Contestants	Judges	Dish	Winner
489	1	"Branzin-GO!"	April 24, 2025	Michael Symon, Christina Perez	Branzino	Saba Wahid Duffy, Juan Carlos Aparicio	Ayesha Nurdjaja, Felipe Donnelly, Einat Admony	Falafel Sandwich	Bobby Flay
490	2	"First Impressions"	May 1, 2025	Alex Guarnaschelli, James Austin Johnson	Littleneck Clams	Stephanie Cmar, David Standridge	Michael Jenkins, Katie Pickens, Ed McFarland	Lobster roll	Stephanie Cmar
491	3	"Bad News for Bobby"	May 8, 2025	Scott Conant, Kaitlan Collins	Goat cheese	Katie Pickens, Hugh Mangum	Sarah Flynn, Chris Scott, Aliya LeeKong	Chicken paprikash	Bobby Flay
492	4	"Always in Fashion"	May 15, 2025	Eddie Jackson, Gigi Hadid	Greek yogurt	Jason Smith, Maya Erickson	Raiza Costa, Paulette Goto, Emiko Chisholm	Hazelnut tart	Jason Smith
493	5	"Guac N'Roll"	May 22, 2025	Michael Voltaggio, Gavin Rossdale	Tangerines	Matthew Jordan, Iliana Cordero	Grace Ramirez, Jeremy Merrin, Danni Rose	Chicken tortilla soup	Bobby Flay
494	6	"Fight Like a Lion"	May 29, 2025	Eric Adjepong, Jaymee Sire	Mangos	Niema Digrazia, Solomon Johnson	Mama Tanya, Micheal Jenkins, Lorna Maseko	Maafe	Niema Digrazia
495	7	"Is It Getting Chile in Here?"	July 17, 2025	Eddie Jackson, Eva Longoria	Ground pork	Nick Zocco, Stefanie Torres	James Gonzalez, Grace Ramirez, Brian Duffy	Chile relleno	Nick Zocco
496	8	"Makeover Takeover"	July 24, 2025	Maneet Chauhan, Tan France	Black beans	Franklin Becker, Kelly "Shibumi" Jones	Jake Dell, Elena Besser, Cody Pruitt	Potato latkes	Franklin Becker
497	9	"Couples Therapy"	July 31, 2025	Antonia Lofaso, Tiffany Haddish	Fried ancho chiles	Hedy Trovato, Talia Trovato	Melba Wilson, Franco Noriega, Adrianna Urbina	Steak arepas	Bobby Flay
498	10	"Knock Out Kitchen"	August 7, 2025	Brooke Williamson, Laila Ali	Zucchini	Ross Martin, Elia Aboumrad	Ed McFarland, Michele Ragussis, Travis Swikard	Sole meunière	Bobby Flay
499	11	"Style and Sass"	August 14, 2025	Carson Kressley, Stephanie Boswell	Challah	Chris Infinger, Kevin Lee	Dana Coswin, Jae Lee, Mama Tanya	Fried chicken and biscuits	Bobby Flay

=== Season 40 ===
No.	#	Title	Original airdate	First round			Second round		
No.	#	Title	Original airdate	Guest(s)	Ingredient(s)	Contestants	Judges	Dish	Winner
500	1	"Get out of my Hair!"	August 14, 2025	Anne Burrell, Scott Conant	papaya	Dave Hadely, Kat Turner,	Chris Scott, Lucinda Scala Quinn, Chintan Pandya	Fried fish sandwich	Bobby Flay
502	2	"Filipino-GO!"	August 22, 2025	Tiffani Faison, Andrew Zimmern	Savoy cabbage	Laila Bazahm, Michael Collantes	Leah Cohen, Corby Kummer, Nicole Ponseca	Kare-kare	Laila Bazahm
503	3	"Bring the Noise!"	August 28, 2025	Sunny Anderson, Nina Parker	Japanese sweet potatoes	Micheal Fiorelli, John Cleveland	Joe Isidori, Melba Wilson, Dustin Everett	Brick chicken	Bobby Flay
504	4	"A Legendary Beatdown!"	September 12, 2025	Eddie Jackson, Wynonna Judd	Pecans	Bobby Marcotte, John Howie	Micheal Psilaleis, Jess Tom, Jason Birehand	Beef stroganoff	Bobby Flay
505	5	"Ready for a Rematch?!"	September 18, 2025	Sophie Flay, Antonia Lofaso	Pita bread	Poppy O'Toole, Mika Leon	Ed McFarland, Melba Wilson, Jeremy Merrin	Ropa Vieja	Mika Leon
506	6	"Like Father Like Son."	September 25, 2025	Michael Symon, Madison Keys	Eggplant	Peter Nguyen, Preston Nguyen	Jae Lee, Jae Lung, Jung Micheal	Kalbi	Bobby Flay
507	7	"Oh,Crepe!"	October 3, 2025	Brooke Williamson, Randall Park	paneer cheese	Marcus Spaziani, Richard Van Le	Corby Kummer, Helen Nguyen, Franco Noriega	Banh Xeeo(Vietnamese Crepes)	Bobby Flay
508	8	"Napa-ing on the Job"	October 16, 2025	Michael Symon, Manon Mathews	Napa cabbage	Stephen Coe, Erin Miller	Todd Mitgang, Lourdes Castro, Ed McFarland	Lobster bisque	Stephen Coe
509	9	"Sunny's Ringers"	October 23, 2025	Sunny Anderson, Amanda Freitag	Nicoise olives	Ed Oliveira, Eric McCree	Chris Scott, Lucinda Scala, Corby Kummer	Salt cod fritters	Bobby Flay
510	10	"Too Hot to Handle"	October 30, 2025	Carla Hall, Sean Evans	Jalapenos	Chris Binotto, Parian Hernandez	Adrienne Cheatham, Peter Giannakas, Tess Sinatro	Chicken wings	Chris Binotto

=== Season 41 ===
No.	#	Title	Original airdate	First round			Second round		Third round			
No.	#	Title	Original airdate	Guest	Ingredient	Contestants	Ingredient	Contestants	Teams	Judges	Dish	Winners
511	1	"Holiday Throwdown: Talk Turkey"	November 11, 2025	Jeff Mauro	Turkey wings	Aarti Sequeira, Kelsey Barnard Clark	Turkey leg quarter	Aarti Sequeira, Andrew Zimmern	Andrew Zimmern & Kelsey Barnard Clark, Bobby Flay & Aarti Sequeira	Chris Cheung, Hari Nayak, Nikki Dinki	Handmade turkey sausage	Andrew Zimmern and Kelsey Barnard Clark
512	2	"Holiday Throwdown: Friendsgiving Potluck"	November 18, 2025	Sunny Anderson	Mashed potatoes with green chili queso	Jet Tila, Damaris Phillips	Honey-glazed ham	Damaris Phillips, Antonia Lofaso	Antonia Lofaso & Damaris Phillips, Bobby Flay & Jet Tila	Mama Tanya, Cody Prunitt, Hillary Sterling	Sausage lasagna	Bobby Flay and Jet Tila
513	3	"Holiday Throwdown: Holidays in the City"	November 25, 2025	Carson Kressley	Lox and cream cheese	Michael Jenkins, Ayesha Nurdjaja	Shellfish platter	Ayesha Nurdjaja, Geoffrey Zakarian	Ayesha Nurdjaja & Geoffrey Zakarian, Bobby Flay & Michael Jenkins	Melba Wilson, Max Tucci, Aliya LeeKong	Lamb tagine	Ayesha Nurdjaja and Geoffrey Zakarian
516	4	"Holiday Throwdown: Ghost of Bobby's Holiday Past"	December 2, 2025	Carla Hall	Fruitcake	Esther Choi, Amanda Freitag	Squab	Esther Choi, Maneet Chauhan	Maneet Chauhan & Amanda Freitag, Bobby Flay & Esther Choi	Leah Cohen, Jay Reifel, Lucinda Scala Quinn	Mutton meat pie	Bobby Flay & Esther Choi
517	5	"Holiday Throwdown: Christmas Everywhere"	December 9, 2025	Sophie Flay	Sugar plums, Indian Holiday market spices	Claudette Zepeda, Gabriele Bertaccini	Rack of lamb, Salt cod	Gabriele Bertaccini, Brooke Williamson	Brooke Williamson & Claudette Zepeda, Bobby Flay & Gabriele Bertaccini	Yara Herrera, Brian Duffy, Karen Akumowicz	Chateaubriand, potato latkes, and a desert souffle	Bobby Flay & Gabriele Bertaccini
518	6	"Holiday Throwdown: Snowed In"	December 16, 2025	Eddie Jackson	Candy cane beets	Mei Lin, Tiffani Faison	Venison	Mei Lin, Michael Voltaggio	Michael Voltaggio & Mei Lin, Bobby Flay & Tiffani Faison	Chris Scott, Emmeline Zhao, Jason Bichard	Yorkshire Christmas pie	Bobby Flay & Tiffani Faison

=== Season 42 ===
No.	#	Title	Original airdate	First round			Second round		
No.	#	Title	Original airdate	Guest(s)	Ingredient(s)	Contestants	Judges	Dish	Winner
519	1	"Attack of the Titans"	January 15, 2026	Michael Voltaggio, Brooke Williamson	Porterhouse lamb chops	Adrianna Urbina, Marcel Vigneron	Brian Duffy, Elena Besser, Ivo Diaz	Loaded Fries	Bobby Flay
520	2	"Razzle Dazzle"	January 22, 2026	Maneet Chauhan, Carson Kressley	King trumpet mushrooms	Hideki Harada, Rajesh Pathak	Chris Cheung, Sakura Yagi, Bikash Kharel	Chicken momo	Bobby Flay
521	3	"The Thrill of the Grill"	January 29, 2026	Josh Capon, Dylan Dreyer	Flanken cut short ribs	Matt Abdoo, Dominique Leach	Michael Lomonaco, Mama Tanya, Hugh Mangum	Grilled pork chops	Matt Abdoo
522	4	"Arrivederci, Bobby!"	February 5, 2026	Jeff Mauro, Chelsea Peretti	finocchi fennel	Antonio Leso, Circo Foldera	Joey Campanara, Olivia Tiedemann, Albert Di Meglio	tortellini	Bobby Flay
523	5	"Power Couple"	February 19, 2026	Wolfgang Puck, Antonia Lofaso	pumpkin seeds	Fany Gerson, Danny Ortiz de Montellano	Jake Dell, Mama Tanya, Emilio Cerra	Steak torta	Bobby Flay
524	6	"Half Baked"	February 26, 2026	Duff Goldman, Amanda Freitag	blueberries	Yohann Le Bescond, Andy de la Cruz	Sam Seneviratne, Dan Langan, Danielle Sepsy	Tres leches cake	Bobby Flay
525	7	"This is How we Roll"	March 5, 2026	Christian Petroni, Damaris Phillips	Rainbow trout	Ilji Cheung, Pyet DeSpain	Sherry Pocknett, Jae Lee, Adrienne Cheatham	Gimbap	Ilji Cheung
526	8	"Southern Comfort"	March 12, 2026	Jeff Mauro, Carson Kressley	Slab bacon	Alexia Gawlak, Austin Sumrall	Dana Cowin, Chris Scott, Hillary Sterling	Tomato pie	Bobby Flay

=== Season 43 ===
No.	#	Title	Original airdate	First round			Second round		
No.	#	Title	Original airdate	Guest(s)	Ingredient(s)	Contestants	Judges	Dish	Winner
527	01	"Stare Downs and Smack Talk"	April 2, 2026	Alex Guarnaschelli, Roy Wood Jr.	Pork tenderloin	Joe Flamm, Dafne Mejia	Marco Canora , Nikki Dinki, Glenn Rollnick	Missoula	Bobby Flay
528	02	"Shaken and Stirred"	April 9, 2026	Amanda Freitag, Taraji P. Henson	Peanut butter	Blaque Shelton, Cristina Vazquez	Paulette Goto, Dan Langan, Danielle Sepsy	Pineapple upside-down cake	Blaque Shelton
529	03	"Oh! My! Gad!"	April 16, 2026	Josh Gad, Damaris Phillips	Mussels	Ciaran McGoldrick, Josh Mouzakes	Cody Pruitt, Adrienne Cheatham, Wylie Dufresne	Parisian gnocchi	Bobby Flay
530	04	"School that fool"	April 23, 2026	Quinta Brunson, Michael Voltaggio	Sourdough bread	Devan Cunningham, Justin Jacobs	Sarah Schneider, Chris Scott, Nikki Dinki	Breakfast burrito	Bobby Flay
531	05	"Shark Bait"	April 30, 2026	Scott Cohan, Lori Greiner	merguez sausage	Derrell Smith, Chris Arellanes	Frank Prisinzano, Lauren Scala, Michael Jenkins	Chicken cacciatore	Chris Arellanes
532	06	"Brawlers vs Bobby"	May 7, 2026	Adrienne Cheatham, Rashad Jones	rack of lamb	Kyle Bryner, T Gregoire	Bill Burney, Leti Skai Young, Hugh Mangum	Jerk pork	Bobby Flay
533	07	"New York State of Grind"	May 14, 2026	Alex Guarnaschelli, Desus Nice	Skirt steak	David Viana, Kess Eshun	Mama Tanya, Michael Psilakis, Aliya LeeKong	chicken jolof rice	Bobby Flay
534	08	"Spill the Tea"	May 21, 2026	Geoffrey Zakarian, Nischelle Turner	Wild striped bass	Emily Lin, Arnold Myint	Salil Mehta, Leah Cohen, Joel Watthanawongwat	Laksa	Bobby Flay
535	09	"Are We Having Fun Yet?"	May 27, 2026	Carson Kressley, Ayesha Nurdjaja	Maitake mushrooms	Logan Sandoval, Laurence Louie	Chris Cheung, Emmeline Zhao, Wilson Tang	Rice noodle roll	Laurence Louie
536	10	"Lights! Camera! Distraction!"	June 4, 2026	Katie Lee Biegel, Paul Scheer	Chicken thighs	Rashida Holmes, Dave White	Mama Tanya, Jason Highs, Asia Shabazz	Fish and Chips	Dave White
537	11	"Pasta Royalty"	June 11, 2026	Christian Petroni, Nadia Caterina Munno	Provolone	Kelsey Murphy, Michael Reed	Albert Di Meglio, Karen Akunowicz, Max Tucci	Cavatelli	Bobby Flay
538	12	"Today Forecast Defeat"	June 18, 2026	Sunny Anderson, Ginger Zee	Tuscan kale	Basil Yu, Sanjay Rawat	Chris Cheung, Aliya LeeKong, Vijay Kumar	Chicken tikka masala	Bobby Flay
539	13	"Tough as Nails"	June 18, 2026	Ayesha Nurdjaja, Antonia Lofaso	Scarlet shrimp	Pete Amadhanirundr, Evelyn Garcia	Aliya LeeKong, Dustin Everett, Hong Thaimee	Panang curry	Bobby Flay
540	14	"Love is Sweet"	July 7, 2026	Kaley Cuoco, Scott Conant	blackberries	Sean McGaughey, Mellissa McGaughey	Paulette Goto, Camari Mick, Danielle Sepsy	Crepe cake	Bobby Flay
541	15	"Bobby BFFs"	July 14, 2026	Brooke Williamson, Damaris Phillips	Pancetta	Christina Miros, Allyson Harvie	Einat Admony, Peter Giannakas, Emily Fedner	Pierogies	Allyson Harvie
542	16	"Beat the Boss"	July 21, 2026	Ross Matthews, Jaymee Sire	Pomegranates	Matt Skrincosky, Allison Cancro	Michael Lomonaco, Emily Fedner, Michael Psilakis	Stuffed cabbage	Matt Skrincosky
543	17	"Pride and Joy"	July 28, 2026	Tiffani Faison, Amber Ruffin	Cheddar cheese	Evan Algorri, Tucker Ricchio	Albert Di Meglio, Elena Blesser, Marco Carnora	Pasta alla vodka	Bobby Flay
544	18	"Mole Mania"	August 4, 2026	Amanda Freitag, Jeff Hiller	Manchego cheese	Thomas Bille, Keegans Andrews	Lourdes Castro, Alex Stupak, Grace Ramirez	Duck mole negro	Thomas Bille
545	19	"Joy and Pain"	August 12, 2026	Hoda Kotb, Katie Lee Biegel	Cabbage	Emma Woods, Quentin Garcia	Jae Lee, Leah Cohen, Shin Takagi	Bibimbap	Emma Woods
546	20	"Titan Takeover"	August 18, 2026	Ayesha Nurdjaja, Brooke Williamson	Blood oranges, Pistachios	Michael Voltaggio, Brooke Williamson	Michael Lomonaco, Melissa Clark, Jonathan Waxman	Fresh pasta lasagna Bolognese	Brooke Williamson
