= Bixler =

Bixler may refer to:

- Bixler High Private Eye (2019 film)
- Bixler Manufacturing Company
- Antley–Bixler syndrome

== People ==
- Brian Bixler (born 1982), baseball player
- Cedric Bixler-Zavala (born 1974), singer and lyricist
- Harris J. Bixler (1862-1930),American politician from Pennsylvania
- J. Monroe Bixler (1917–1991), American politician from Nebraska
- Litza Bixler (born 1970), film and commercial choreographer
- Paul Bixler (1907–1985), American football coach
- Solon Bixler (born 1977), guitarist

== See also ==
- Bixley
