= Tierney Dining Cars =

American brand of lunch wagons 1895 to 1933

Tierney Dining Cars was an American brand of lunch wagons at the beginning of the 20th century. Its origins can be traced to 1895, when the business founder Patrick J. Tierney began to build truck-based cars modeled after railroad dining cars. This eventually resulted in a business that manufactured prefabricated diners, which was incorporated in 1922 and ceased trading in 1933.

== History ==
Patrick J. Tierney was the son of an Irish immigrant. In 1895, at the age of 29, he started a chain of lunch wagons. Reinvesting the profits, by 1905 he had 38 outlets operating 24 hours per day in strategic locations. These outlets had been built by Thomas H. Buckley (Note: Formerly a worker in a lunch wagon, Thomas H. Buckley had begun manufacturing them in Worcester, Massachusetts from the late 1880s. The originator of the concept was Walter Scott who, in 1872, adapted a covered wagon in Rhode Island for the purpose.) but in 1905 he began constructing his own units in a garage behind his house at Cottage Place, New Rochelle, New York.

The increased use of automobiles at this time meant that new zoning laws were restricting or even banning on-street food outlets, and thus forcing vendors to find fixed locations from which to sell. Simultaneously, lunch wagons were developing a reputation as disreputable due to the prevalence of cheap conversions of dilapidated horsecars, which were being sold off as New York's public transport transitioned to electric streetcars. The innovative Tierney, who coined the word diner, saw an opportunity: intending his static units to resemble railroad dining cars, he produced items of quality using, for example, electric lighting rather than kerosene lamps and replacing the outside toilets with interior ones. Initially selling his prefabricated diners for US$1,000 each, and often offering flexible payment terms, Tierney died a millionaire in 1917.

Tierney's sons, Edward J. and Edgar T. Tierney, then formed the partnership of P. J. Tierney Sons, which took over and carried on their father's business. The partnership became an incorporated company – P. J. Tierney Sons, Inc. – with the shareholders being the two brothers and their uncle, Daniel Tierney. The company claimed to manufacture one dining car each day and was, according to Andrew Hurley, "easily the most prolific of the prewar dining car manufacturers as well as a seedbed for other firms". Among the manufacturing businesses that were created by former employees were the Fodero Dining Car Company and the Kullman Dining Car Company. Unlike most of their competitors, the Tierney factory was some miles from a railroad and so the company created an in-house trucking department.

Aside from manufacturing cars, for which they also offered operational training courses for new owners, the Tierney brothers also established the Tierney Operating Company in 1923. The purpose of this listed company was to open one new company-owned diner per week on average, over a period of four years. The brothers signed over all of their existing cars in New Jersey, New York and Westchester County to the company and offered half of its 500,000 shares to the public.

Edgar Tierney ceased involvement and sold his share of the business to his brother in February 1926. In September that year the company ran into financial difficulties, causing Edward and Daniel Tierney to sell their controlling interest and then, in July 1927, their entire interest. Edgar, Edward and Daniel had formed Tierney Brothers, Inc. in February 1927 with the intention of competing against P. J. Tierney, Inc. This business, based at Mount Vernon, New York, solicited orders, allegedly by misrepresenting to be a continuation of the P. J. Tierney concern. It commenced production but delivered nothing because a restraining order was imposed that prevented them from using their name.

In 1929, Edward J. Tierney was involved with the Roadateria company, a short-lived business that made a product described as a "combination dining car, lunch car and road stand". Just before he died in 1946, he tried again with a company called Tierney Diners, Inc. but that, too, produced nothing beyond the design phase.

The dining car industry managed to continue expanding during the Great Depression but there was some significant restructuring. P. J. Tierney, Inc. ceased trading in 1933, although remnants of it passed into what is now DeRaffele Manufacturing.

== See also ==
- Jerry O'Mahony Diner Company
- Worcester Lunch Car Company
