= Agawam Diner =

- U.S. National Register of Historic Places
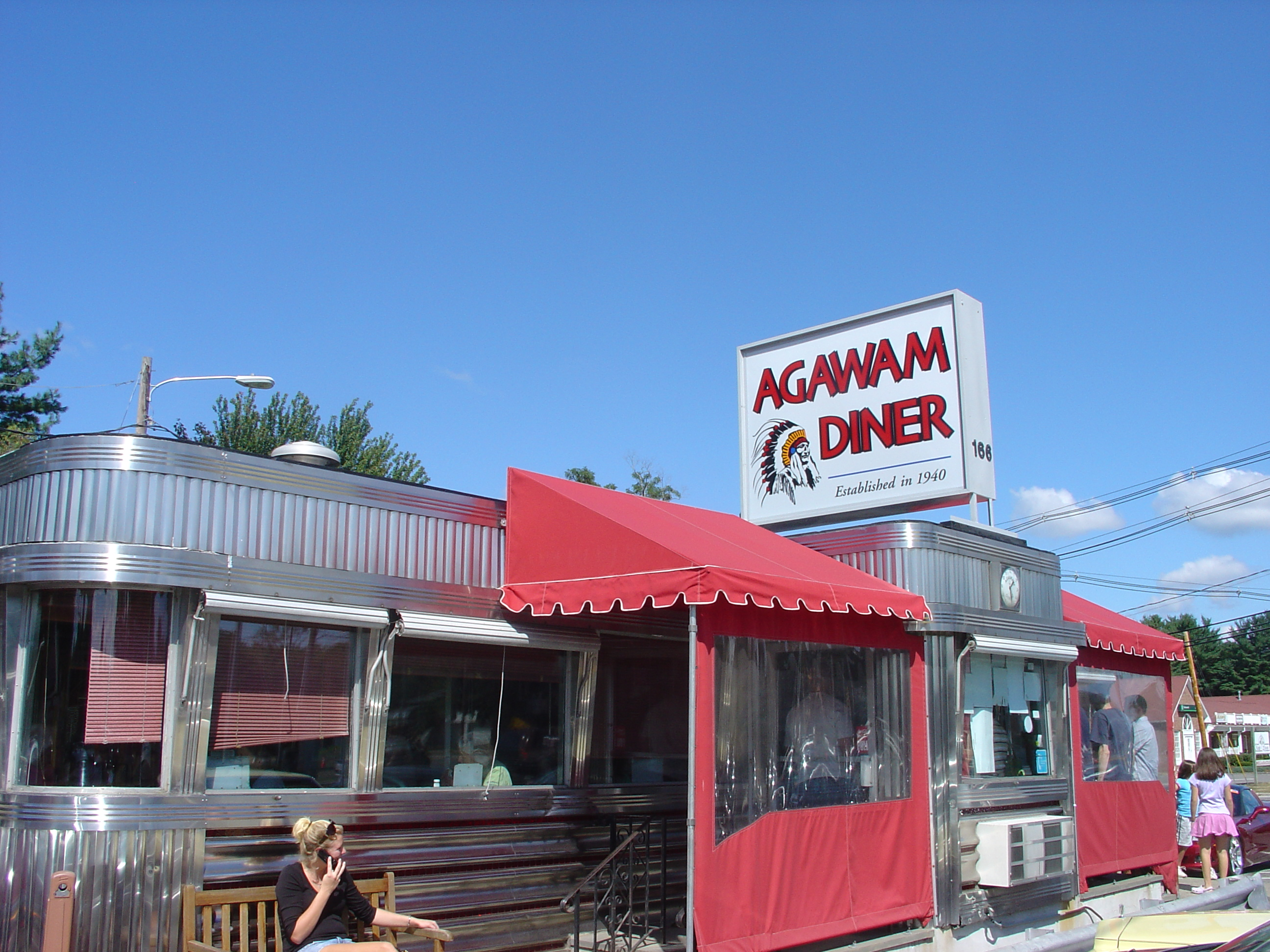

- Location within Massachusetts Location within the United States
- Location: 166 Newburyport Tpk., Rowley, Massachusetts
- Coordinates: 42°42′17″N 70°54′37″W
- Built: 1954
- Architect: Fodero Dining Car Company
- MPS: Diners of Massachusetts MPS
- NRHP reference No.: 99001124
- Added to NRHP: September 22, 1999

The Agawam Diner is an historic diner at 166 Newburyport Turnpike (U.S. Route 1) in Rowley, Massachusetts. It was manufactured in 1954 and moved to this location in 1970 after first being in Ipswich. It is the town's only diner and one of only six in the state manufactured by the Fodero Dining Car Company. It was listed on the National Register of Historic Places in 1999.

== Description ==
The Agawam Diner stands in the area of Rowley known as Kent's Corner, on a lot of 0.75 acres (0.30 ha) at the southwest corner of Newburyport Turnpike and Haverhill Street (Massachusetts Route 133). It is a single-story building, six bays wide and seven deep. Its exterior is finished with a combination of horizontal and vertical metal banding and has rounded corners. At the center of its main facade is a projecting entry vestibule with entrances at the sides. The stairs leading to the entrances are sheltered by removable canvas awnings. The interior is divided roughly in half, the front half housing the dining and service area and the rear the kitchen. The dining area includes booths along the front wall and stools at the counter separating the dining and service areas.

== History ==
The Galanis family opened a diner on this site in 1947, in a structure manufactured by the Worcester Lunch Car Company. It was one of three locations operated by the Galanises; the others were in Ipswich (opened 1940) and Peabody. In 1954, the Galanises purchased two diners from the Fodero Dining Car Company of Bloomfield, New Jersey. One was placed at Ipswich, replacing a Worcester diner the family sold, and the other was placed in Peabody. The Peabody diner closed in 1960, and the Ipswich one in 1970. The Galanises then opted to sell the diner at Rowley and moved the Ipswich diner to its location.

The diner is named for a local Indian tribe.

== See also ==
- List of diners
- National Register of Historic Places listings in Essex County, Massachusetts
