= Sam's Diner =

- U.S. National Register of Historic Places
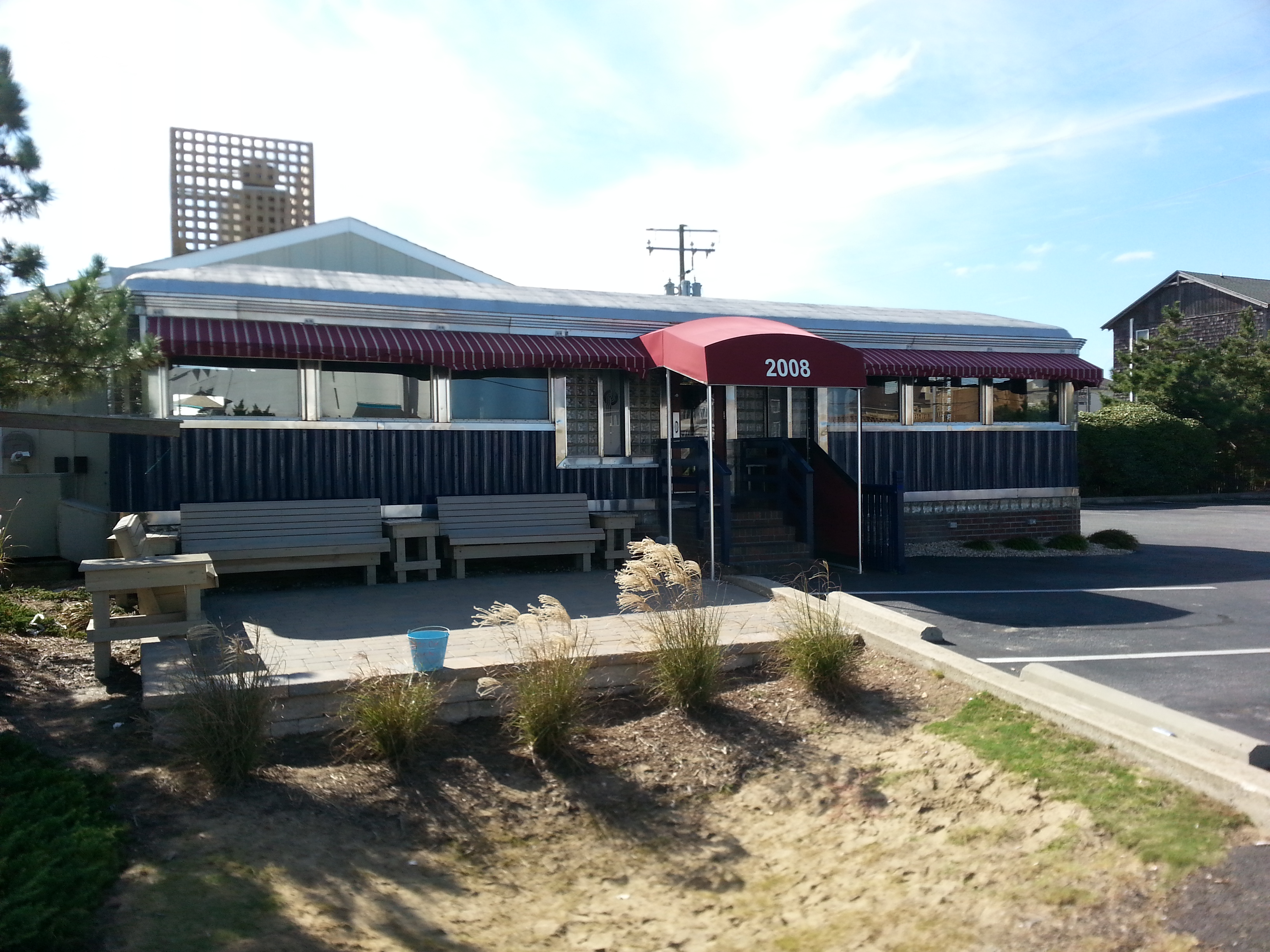
- Sam's Diner, October 2013

- Location within North Carolina Location within the United States
- Location: 2008 S. Virginia Dare Trail, Kill Devil Hills, North Carolina
- Coordinates: 35°59′46″N 75°38′50″W
- Area: less than one acre
- Built: c. 1940
- Built by: Kullman Dining Car Co.
- Architectural style: Moderne
- NRHP reference No.: 99000062
- Added to NRHP: January 27, 1999

Sam's Diner, also known as Millie's Diner and Victory Diner, is a historic diner located at Kill Devil Hills, Dare County, North Carolina. It was built about 1940 by the Kullman Dining Car Co., and moved to its present location in 1996. It is a one-story, Streamline Moderne style steel frame building sheathed in porcelain enamel panels and stainless steel trim.

It was listed on the National Register of Historic Places in 1999.

As of 2019, the building houses a diner named the Kill Devil Grill.
