= Empire Diner =

Restaurant in Manhattan, New York

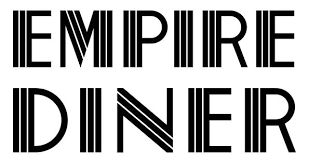

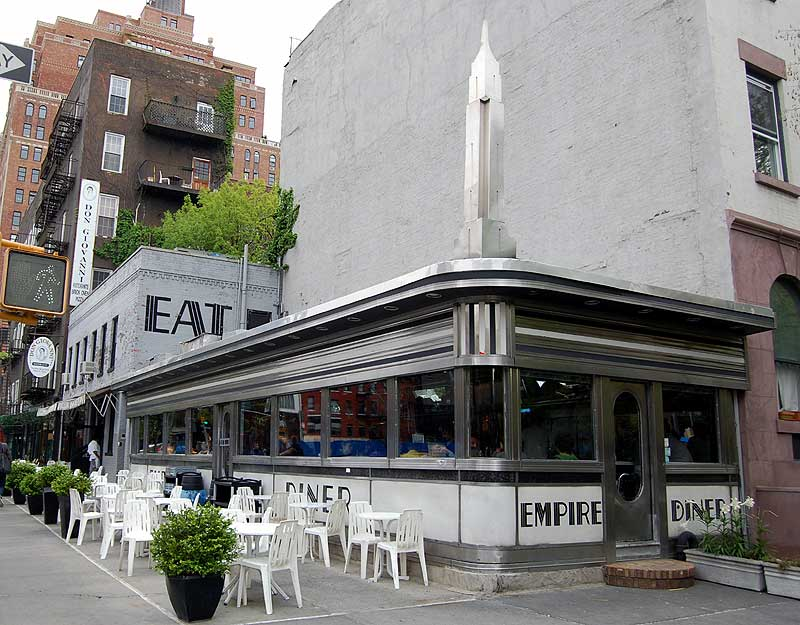
- Seen in 2010
- Interactive map of Empire Diner

Restaurant information
- Location: 210 Tenth Avenue, New York, New York, 10011
- Coordinates: 40°44′50″N 74°00′16″W
- Website: empire-diner.com

The Empire Diner is a restaurant in New York City that launched a vogue for upscale retro diners, and whose art deco exterior became an iconic image in numerous films and television programs. It is located at the corner of Tenth Avenue and 22nd Street in the neighborhood of Chelsea.

== Importance ==
Constructed by the Fodero Dining Car Company in 1946 and operating as a Manhattan diner until being abandoned years later, the diner was refurbished in 1976. Additions included a stylized Empire State Building outline on its roof. It became a city fixture and an artists' nexus from then on. The Empire opened on February 29, 1976 (Leap Day). The restaurant closed on May 15, 2010, and The Highliner opened briefly in its space that same year. The restaurant reopened under the name Empire Diner, under executive chef Amanda Freitag, in January 2014, and closed after less than a year of service in December 2015. Empire Diner reopened under executive chef Jestin Feggan of Cafeteria, a Chelsea favorite for over two decades, and its managing partner Stacy Pisone in April 2017.

== Creation ==
The Art Deco style dining car that served as the physical structure of the Empire Diner was constructed by the Fodero Dining Car Company in 1946. Situated at 210 Tenth Avenue, on the corner of West 22nd Street in Chelsea, Manhattan, it was closed and nearly abandoned in 1976 when new owners Jack Doenias, Carl Laanes, and Richard Ruskay renovated "the former greasy spoon on then-grungy 10th Ave. and turned it into the landmark restaurant [that] [...] became a major force in the Chelsea Renaissance that allowed art galleries, hotels, and other restaurants to replace the machine shops, gas stations and auto parts stores that then dominated the landscape."

The diner had previously had its original windows changed and its monitor roof hidden from the outside. The three partners painted "EAT" in large letters on a wall behind the diner, put in a miniature, stainless steel, a stylized outline of the Empire State Building on a corner of the roof, and replaced the Formica tabletops and counters with black glass. The partners also opened Ruskay's, another restaurant, on Columbus Avenue, that same year, and would open Rick's Lounge, in downtown Manhattan on Eighth Avenue, in 1981.

The Empire Diner became a popular success, appearing as a New York magazine cover story, "The New Great-Looking Dining Places: Is the Food as Good as the Design?', the year that it opened. Diner historians credit it with sparking a movement toward similar upscale retro diners. Wrote author Richard J. S. Gutman, "The Empire pioneered the concept of the diner being something other than just a diner. With candlelight, live piano music, and an untraditional menu somewhat on the pricey side, this was a new tangent for diners." Author Randy Garbin, founder of Roadside Magazine, wrote that the new owners had taken "a run-down [...] diner in a depressed neighborhood and introduced haute cuisine. The irony struck chords in both the New York art and restaurant scenes, with repercussions throughout the country." Its menu included traditional American fare, but also such signature dishes as "Jack's chili sundae" and pigs in a blanket made with Vienna sausages and biscuit dough. The 24-hour diner's "highbrow-lowbrow fusion ... built a steady clientele among the neighborhood's culture vultures and its club-going nighthawks alike."

== Owners after Ruskay ==
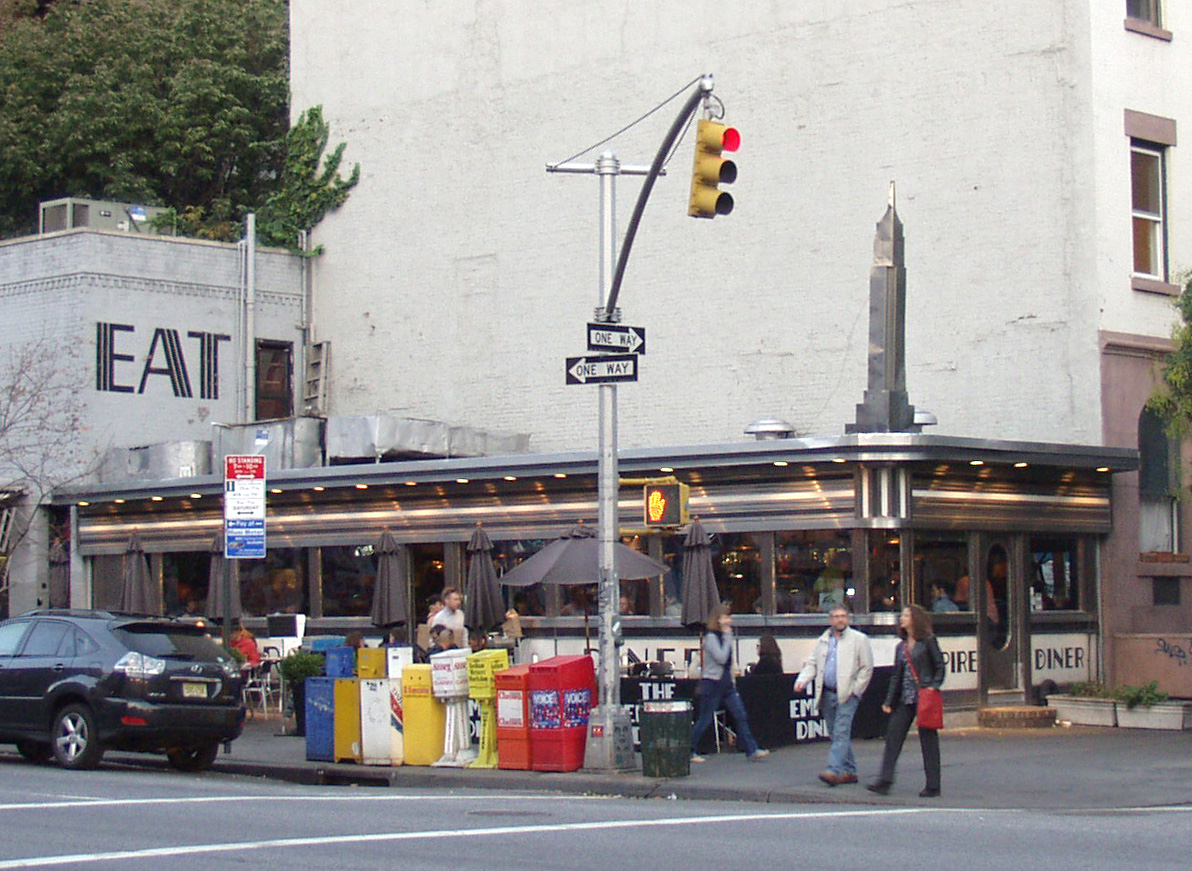
The diner as seen from across 10th Avenue in 2009.

Following the deaths of Ruskay (d. March 16, 1992) and Doenias, Laanes sold the operation to executive chef Mitchell Woo, who had been with the diner since 1980, and general manager Renate Gonzalez, who had joined in 1986.

Between 2005 and 2010, Thomas Feucht, founder and CEO of The Kullmans Diner Group joined the executive team of Nothing Heavy inc. The Feucht family held the Empire Diner trademark rights in the USA until 2014. Upon returning the trademark rights to NHI inc., the path was clear for Amanda Freitag to reopen the diner under the Empire Diner name. The last years of the old Empire Diner were heavily influenced by the Feucht family, i.e. the iconic outdoor cafe with its black furniture and partitions.

In late 2009, lease negotiations between the Empire Diner owners and Chuck Levinson, whose family had owned the property since the early 1930s, ended without a lease renewal. The physical structure was scheduled to be taken over under a new name by restaurateurs Carolyn Benitez, Charles Milite, and Eric Petterson of the Gotham City Restaurant Group, under a 15-year lease. The last day of business for the Empire Diner at this location was May 15, 2010. Woo and Gonzalez filed a lawsuit in the United States District Court for the Southern District of New York, in Manhattan, in late April 2010, alleging the landlord wanted to claim the name "Empire Diner" to pass along to the next proprietors. The judge in this trademark lawsuit ruled on December 3, 2010, that the case could go to trial. By this time, the rooftop Empire State Building replica had gone missing.

By late July, Gotham City Restaurant Group, "without substantial renovation", had opened a new restaurant at the site, the Highliner. The New Yorker opined, "The body remains, but the soul has vanished. The Highliner is representative, though, of the new Chelsea that is emerging on weekends, as visitors flood the elevated park the restaurant is named after: touristy, overpriced, and shiny. It is not uncommon to see guidebooks and maps spread out on the nascent eatery's outdoor tables. Of course, tourists need to eat, too, but at the Highliner they do not get to eat particularly well."

The restaurant reopened under the name Empire Diner, under executive chef Amanda Freitag, in January 2014; at first, it served only dinner, and later expanded to offering a lunch menu. Freitag left in July 2015.

== Significance ==
The Empire Diner was frequented by celebrities including Meryl Streep and her then partner, John Cazale, Josh Brolin, Minnie Driver, Ethan Hawke, Madonna, Julia Roberts with then-boyfriend Benjamin Bratt, Steven Spielberg, Barbra Streisand, and Kate Winslet. It was not universally loved, however: A Village Voice critic wrote near the end of the diner's run that, "The building itself is deservedly beloved, but the restaurant's surly service and way overpriced, completely unremarkable grub mean that the only thing we'll miss is the upright piano." Regardless, wrote The New Yorker in 1998, "Every art scene gets the hangout it deserves. In the '50s, there was the Cedar Tavern ... [then] Max's Kansas City, a steakhouse near Union Square, catered to the '60s cool school.... In the '80s, the art world headed down to Tribeca to toast itself at the Odeon. And in the '90s? The new spot is the Empire Diner, a glitz-free, gemutlich place tucked among the warehouses of West Chelsea...." According to HBO's Western Stars (2019) and Bruce Springsteen's autobiography Born to Run (2016), Springsteen often met Patti Scialfa on a bench across from the Empire Diner where he eventually proposed to her.

== In popular culture ==
The Empire Diner has appeared in numerous films, television programs, and advertisements.

Films

- Godspell (1973)
- Manhattan (1979)
- See You in the Morning (1989)
- Home Alone 2: Lost in New York (1992)
- Men in Black II (2002)
- Igby Goes Down (2002)
- City Island (2009)

Television

- Law & Order
- Saturday Night Live (opening credits)
- The Days and Nights of Molly Dodd (closing credits)
- And Just Like That

Other

- Asylum Years by Tom Waits (album cover)
- It appeared in an H. J. Heinz company print advertisement for ketchup, in Time magazine.
- It was the subject of an oil painting by the fine art painter John Baeder.
- "NYC Girl" by John Waite (lyrics)
- "The Great Wall of China" by Billy Joel (lyrics)

== See also ==
- List of restaurants in New York City
- Moondance Diner – Diner in New York City (1933–2012)
- Munson Diner – Historic commercial building in New York, United States
