= Fodero Dining Car Company =

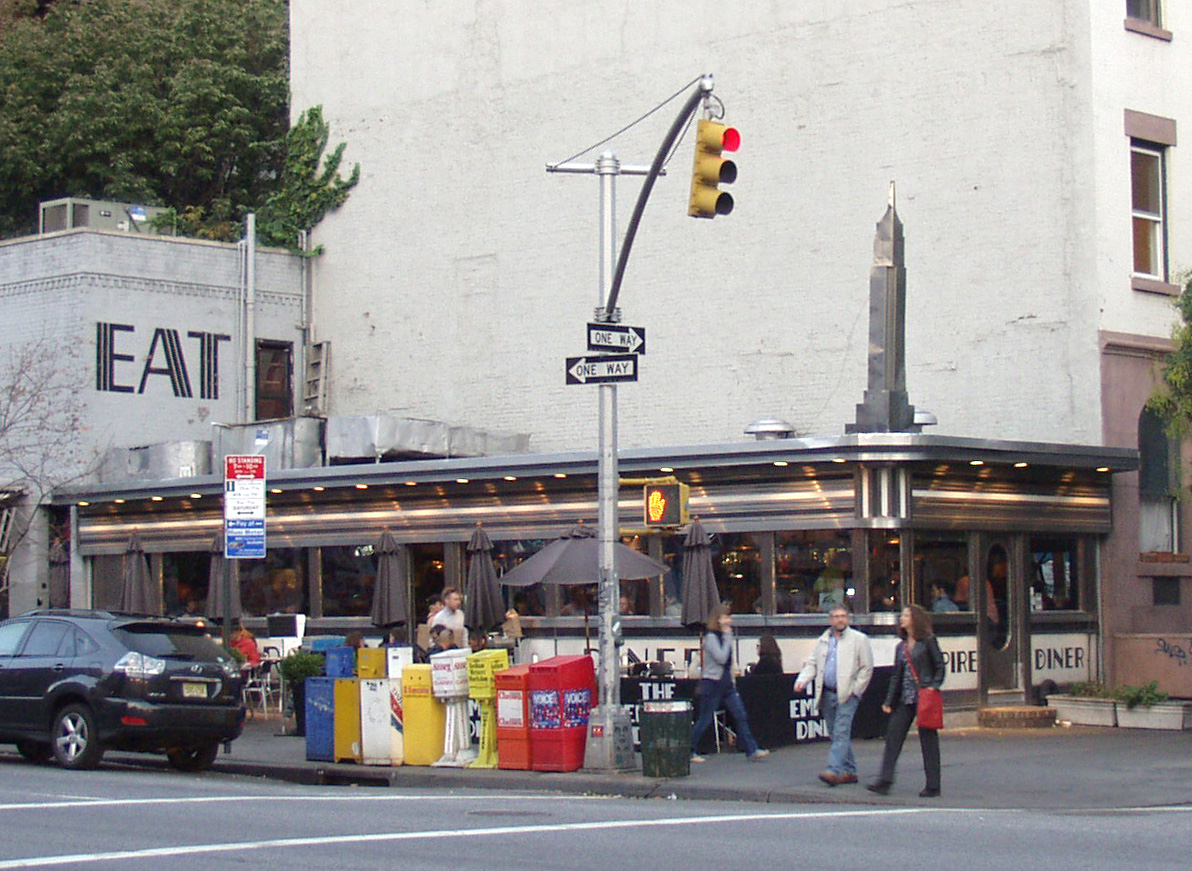
Empire Diner

The Fodero Dining Car Company (1933–1981) was a diner manufacturer located in Newark and later Bloomfield, New Jersey. It was founded by Italian immigrant Joseph Fodero, who formed the company after constructing diners with P. J. Tierney Sons and Kullman Industries.

Fodero diners are known for their stainless steel exteriors and art deco appearance. Diners constructed by the company are located primarily in the Northeastern United States, especially New Jersey, New York, and Pennsylvania.

Many diners constructed by the company remain in operation as of 2010, among them the Empire Diner in Manhattan, New York City, the Agawam Diner in Rowley, Massachusetts, the Edgemere Diner in Shrewsbury, Massachusetts, and the former Bound Brook Diner, originally located in Bound Brook, New Jersey but since was relocated to Charlotte, NC and re-opened as Mattie’s Diner.

== See also ==
- List of diners
