= Munson Diner =

Historic commercial building in New York, United States

- U.S. National Register of Historic Places
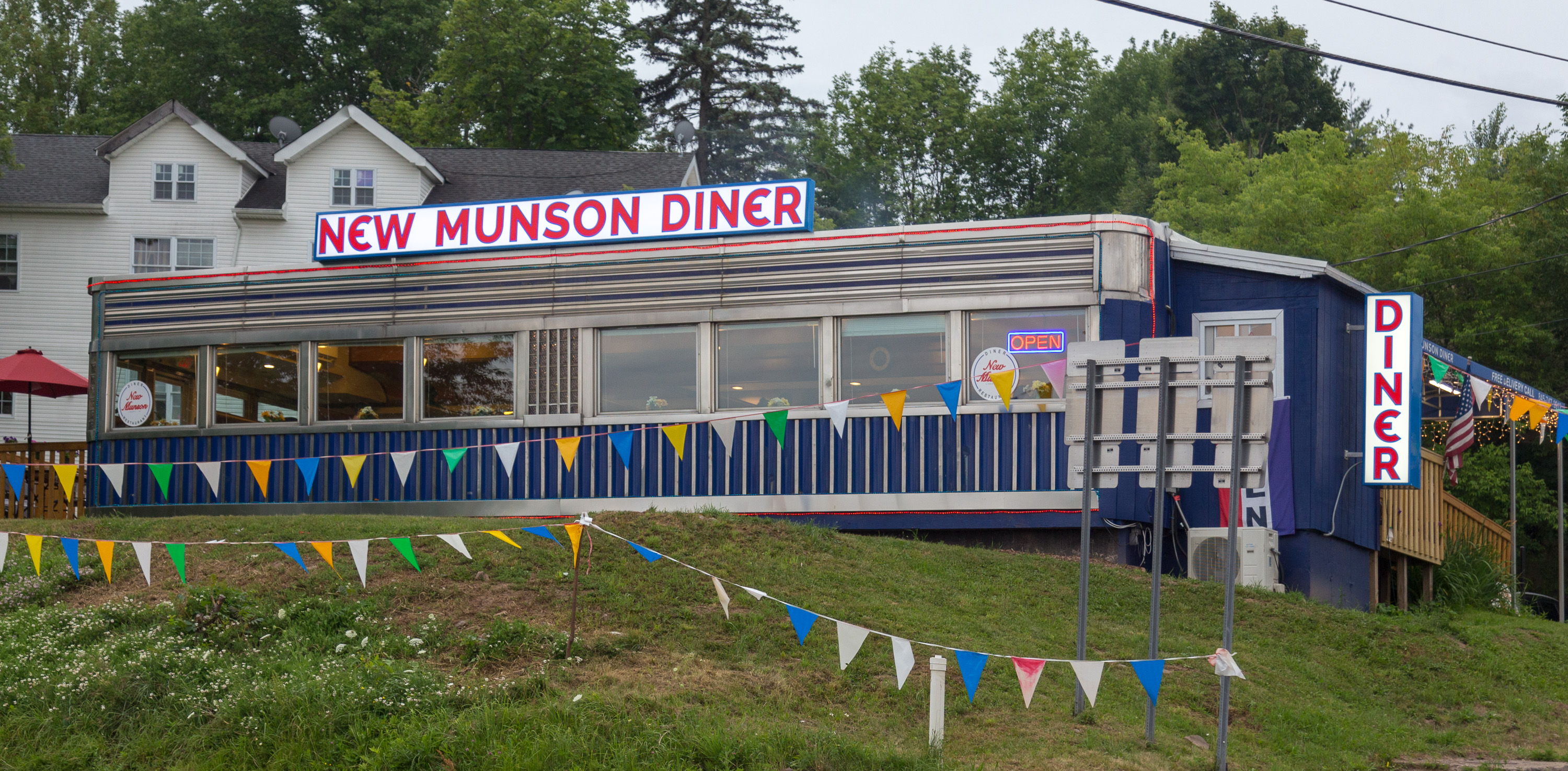
- Munson Diner, July 2018

- Location within New York Location within the United States
- Location: 12 Lake St. (NY 55), Liberty, New York
- Coordinates: 41°47′49.7″N 74°44′40.5″W
- Area: 0.5 acres (0.20 ha)
- Built: 1945
- Architect: Kullman Dining Car Co.
- Architectural style: Moderne
- NRHP reference No.: 06000256
- Added to NRHP: April 12, 2006

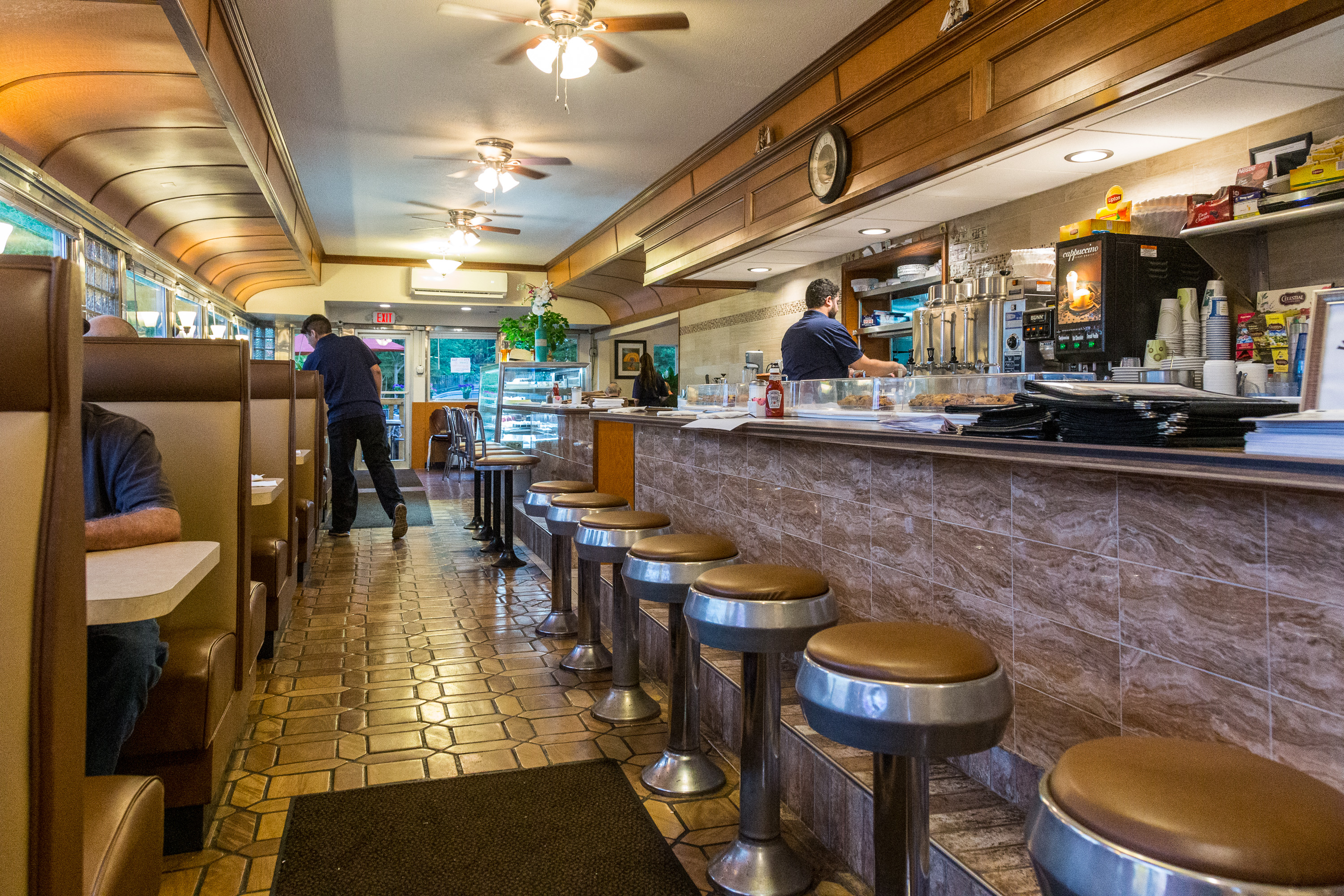
Interior view

Munson Diner is a historic diner located at Liberty in Sullivan County, New York. It was manufactured in 1945 by the Kullman Dining Car Company of Lebanon, New Jersey. It has a riveted steel frame and exterior of stainless steel and porcelain enamel. It has a long, rectangular form, 16 feet wide by 50 feet long. The interior has a plan typical of the diners of the 1940s and 1950s. It was moved from West 49th Street and 11th Avenue, New York City, to Liberty in 2005.

It was added to the National Register of Historic Places in 2006. Allan Bérubé (1946–2007) initiated the saving, redevelopment, and moving of the diner.

== In popular culture ==
The diner has served as a filming location in Kojak and American Express commercials. It served as "Reggie's Diner", the local alternative to Monk's Cafe, in several episodes of Seinfeld, such as in "The Soup", when George introduces the gang to Reggie's because his attempts to date a waitress at Monk's have led to an awkward situation. In "The Bizarro Jerry" episode, the 'regular gang' of Reggie's Diner befriend Elaine and introduce her to the "alternate bizarro universe" that goes on there. In "The Pool Guy", George escapes to Reggie's when his fiancée joins the friend group at Monk's.

The 2014 dark comedy film Hits, directed by David Cross and starring Matt Walsh and Michael Cera, was filmed and set in Liberty, New York, and the diner can be seen in the opening moments of the film as well as a later scene inside the diner.

== See also ==
- Empire Diner
- Moondance Diner
- National Register of Historic Places listings in Sullivan County, New York
