= St. Paul's Evangelical Lutheran Church (Liberty, New York) =

Historic church in New York, United States

- U.S. National Register of Historic Places
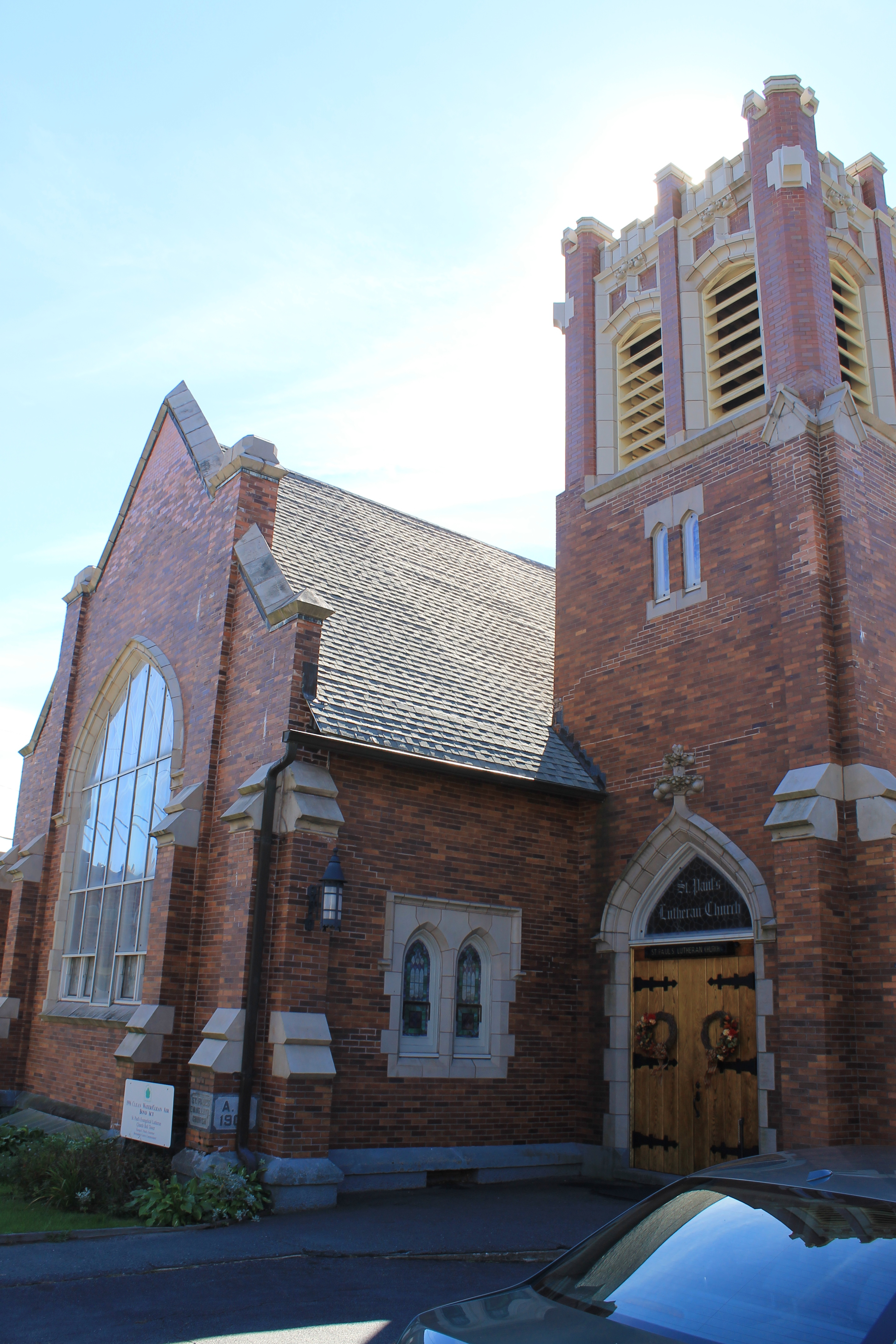

- Location within New York Location within the United States
- Location: 24 Chestnut St., Liberty, New York
- Coordinates: 41°47′56″N 74°44′50″W
- Area: less than one acre
- Built: 1908
- Architect: multiple
- Architectural style: Late 19th And 20th Century Revivals, Late Gothic Revival
- NRHP reference No.: 97000845
- Added to NRHP: August 15, 1997

St. Paul's Evangelical Lutheran Church is a historic Evangelical Lutheran church in Liberty, Sullivan County, New York. It was built in 1908 and is a modest Late Gothic Revival style building. It is built of iron spot brick with limestone and terra cotta trim. It features a gable roofed nave with and engaged side entrance tower.

It was added to the National Register of Historic Places in 1997.
