= Ponzio's =

Philadelphian eatery

- Interactive map of Ponzio's

Restaurant information
- Established: 1964
- Location: Cherry Hill, New Jersey, U.S.
- Coordinates: 39.9138°N 75.0121°W

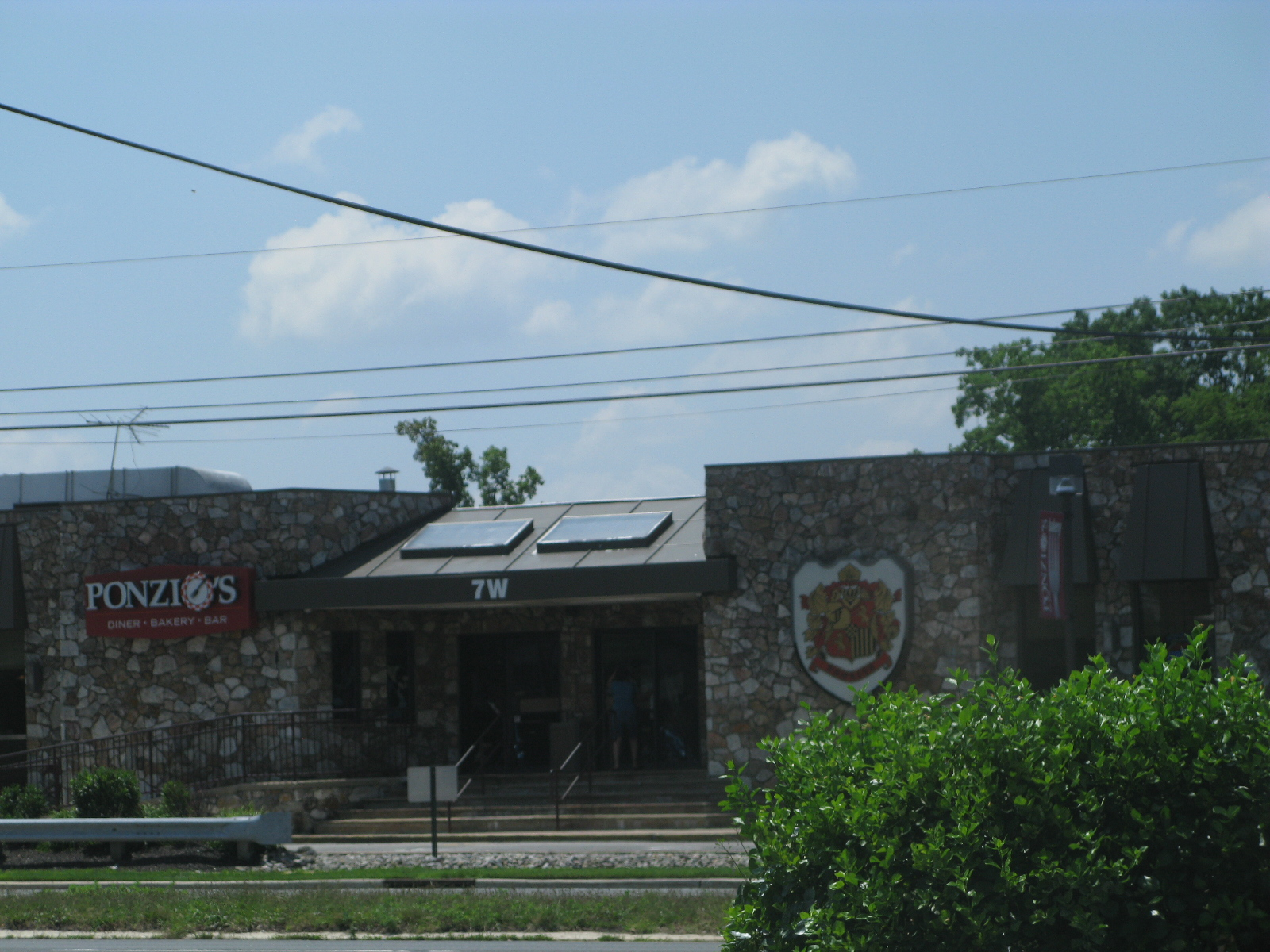
Ponzio's Diner, July 2011

Ponzio's is a family style diner, bar, and bakery located in Cherry Hill, New Jersey at the former Ellisburg Circle. Ponzio's opened in 1964 and is a popular eatery in the Philadelphia metropolitan area, hosting families, power brokers, and celebrities. It is considered an iconic location and is known as Cherry Hill's oldest restaurant.

The diner went through many different owners over the years and has remained a family business ever since it opened. In 1979, the diner made some major renovations. In 1984, the bar room was built. Recent changes of the bar were made in 2005, where plasma televisions were added, along with other renovations.

Ponzio's uses the slogan "Not Your Typical Diner" and is said to have employed over 10,000 people.
