= DeRaffele Manufacturing =

The DeRaffele Manufacturing Company was established in 1933 as Johnson & DeRaffele in New Rochelle, NY. The Company fabricated diners in the old P. J. Tierney plant after the Tierney company had been liquidated in 1933. Later they added banks, restaurants and other modular buildings to their scope of services. DeRaffele is currently the largest (and one of the oldest) manufacturer of diners. It also now specializes in diner renovations.

== History ==
Angelo DeRaffele began to work at the Tierney Dining Car Company as a carpenter in 1921. DeRaffele's friend Joseph Fodero also worked at Tierney's. DeRaffele learned the business thoroughly in a short time and rose to the level of foreman. During the Great Depression, there was some significant restructuring at P. J. Tierney, Inc. and by 1933, the company ceased trading and was liquidated. DeRaffele along with Carl A. Johnson, the former President at Tierney resumed the fabrication of diners at the Tierney plant under the business name of Johnson & DeRaffele. The company successfully faced and survived challenges like the Great Depression and rationing of materials in World War II. By 1947, DeRaffele owned the Company outright and changed the name to the DeRaffele Manufacturing Company.

After the war, the industry boomed. In 1948, Mr. DeRaffele's son Philip joined the business after working there during his high school years. Philip took on all aspects of the company including design. He designed his first diner at age seventeen. He soon attempted to initiate changes in the company. He tried to convince his father that people were tired of the same small structures that kept coming out of their shop. The subsequent design of the Peter Pan diner, built in the 1950s in Wilmington, DE, transformed the look of diners and helped attract business to the company. The exterior had wings, a bigger canopy and novel window shapes.

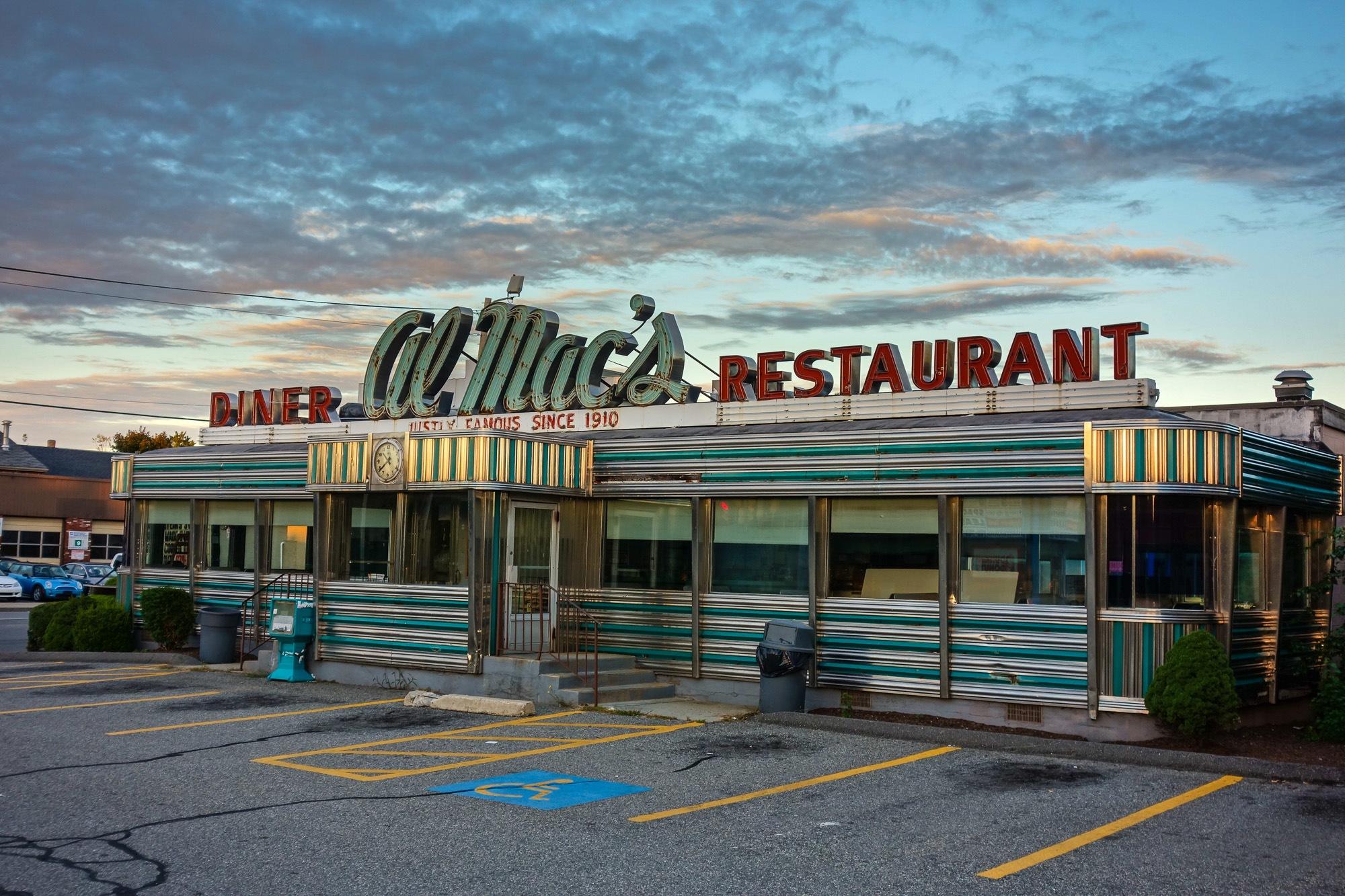
Al Mac's Diner (a 1953 DeRaffele) in Fall River, Massachusetts

The business was then headed by the son from 1957 when the elder DeRaffele died. The company is now owned by brothers Joseph, Stephen and Phil Jr., sons of Philip. Philip S. DeRaffele (philip's grandson) is presently building and renovating diners and restaurants as the 4th generation in this field.

== Business ==
Since the company started keeping track in the 1970s, it has designed, built and renovated more than 650 diners. Today's company now does about three renovations of existing diners for each new diner that is fabricated. The majority of the DeRaffele diners are on the East Coast in New York, Connecticut, Pennsylvania, Maryland and New Jersey. The company does not make “simulated diners” – diners built in storefronts or existing buildings.

The company works with interior decorators, who assist the prospective diner owner choose a floor, the style of the booths, bars and other features of the design. After the design is completed, the staff, including stonecutters, sheet-metal workers, carpenters and welders, will build the project. From start to finish, the process takes about four to five months. After the diners are fabricated, they are taken apart for delivery in sections, transported (by DeRaffele trucks) and reassembled on the site.

Approximately 170 DeRaffele Diners are currently operating in 12 states, including Texas, Georgia and South Carolina. Among the notable diners are:

- Al Mac's Diner-Restaurant – Fall River, MA (1953 DeRaffele)
- Ponzio's – Cherry Hill, NJ (DeRaffele 1970s)
- Van Dam Diner – Long Island City, NY (1944 DeRaffele)
- Penrose Diner - Philadelphia, PA (1963 DeRaffele)
- Hilton Head Diner – Hilton Head, SC (1993 DeRaffele)
- Hullabaloo Diner – College Station, TX (1950 DeRaffele)
