= Amanda Freitag =

American chef and television personality (born 1972)

- Born: May 11, 1972 (age 54); New Jersey, U.S.
- Education: The Culinary Institute of America
- Occupations: Celebrity chef, reality show judge
- Culinary career
- Current restaurants
- Rise & Thyme, Dallas (2020–August 31, 2022)
- Previous restaurants
- * Vong New York, New York City (1989–1994), * Verbena, New York City (1994–?), * L'Arpège, Paris (1999), * Cesca Enoteca & Trattoria, New York City (2003–?), * The Harrison, New York City (?–2010), * Empire Diner, New York City (2014–2015)
- Television shows
- * Chopped (2009–present), * Iron Chef America: The Series (2009, 2012), * Unique Eats (2010–2013), * American Diner Revival (2015–2016)

Amanda Freitag (born May 11, 1972) is an American celebrity chef and cookbook author. She is known for her frequent appearances on Food Network television programs and her work as a judge on television cooking competitions. She is based in New York City.

== Early life and education ==
Freitag was raised in Cedar Grove, New Jersey. She attended Cedar Grove High School, then known as Memorial High School, where her home economics teacher, Joan Levine, suggested that Freitag might be interested in attending the Culinary Institute of America (CIA). Freitag attended CIA at the Hyde Park location, graduating in 1989.

== Restaurant career ==
Following graduation in 1989, Freitag took a position at Vong New York working under chef Jean-Georges Vongerichten. In 1994, she left Vong to cook at Verbena, under chef Diane Forley. Freitag has stated that her time at Verbena was meaningful and she built important relationships, and where she first learned to focus on using local, organic ingredients. After Verbena, Freitag traveled to France and Italy, working for a short while at L'Arpège restaurant under chef Alain Passard in 1999.

In 2003, Freitag and restaurateur Godfrey Polistina opened the Upper West Side restaurant Cesca Enoteca & Trattoria. Freitag was chef de cuisine at Cesca, before moving to an executive chef position at The Harrison. On September 3, 2010, The New York Times reported that Freitag would be leaving the Harrison, and the restaurant's owner, Jimmy Bradley, will return as chef.

From January 2014 until July 2015, Freitag took over as executive chef of the Empire Diner in Manhattan, New York.

In September 2020, Freitag and Kevin Lillis’ Hospitality Alliance opened the bistro Rise & Thyme in Dallas, Texas.

=== Restaurants ===
==== Former ====
- Vong New York, New York City (1989–1994)
- Verbena, New York City (1994–?)
- Arpège, Paris (1999)
- Cesca Enoteca & Trattoria, Upper West Side, New York City (2003–?)
- The Harrison, New York City (?–2010)
- Empire Diner, New York City (2014–2015)

== Television appearances ==
Since 2009, Freitag has been a frequent judge on the culinary reality game show Chopped.

In 2009, She battled Bobby Flay on Iron Chef America in “Battle: King Crab” (season 7, episode 10), with judges Keyshawn Johnson, Maggie Rodriguez, and Domenica Catelli. She narrowly lost, with a score of 49 against Flay's 50 points. The judging was evenly matched, with the exception of Freitag having earned one point fewer in the "taste" category.

Freitag competed in The Next Iron Chef Season 2, finishing in fourth place. Freitag stated she would continue as a judge on Chopped for the 2010 season and she returned for the season four episode "Against the Tide".

On the April 15, 2012 episode of Iron Chef America, Freitag appeared alongside Chopped Grand Champion Madison Cowan in "Battle: Kale", acting as Cowan's sous chef. She appeared as a contestant on season five of The Next Iron Chef. She lost to Alexandra Guarnaschelli in the finale on December 23.

On May 22, 2015, she and Ty Pennington began hosting the new Food Network series American Diner Revival, on which they make over diners' menus and interiors.

On March 4, 2020, Freitag competed on the first season of Food Network’s Tournament of Champions, hosted by Guy Fieri. Freitag placed second in the competition.

== Publications ==
- Freitag, Amanda; King, Carrie (2015). The Chef Next Door: a pro chef's recipes for fun, fearless home cooking. New York City, NY: William Morrow, an imprint of Harper Collins. ISBN 9780062345837.
