= Town and Country Building =

Historic commercial building in New York, United States

- U.S. National Register of Historic Places
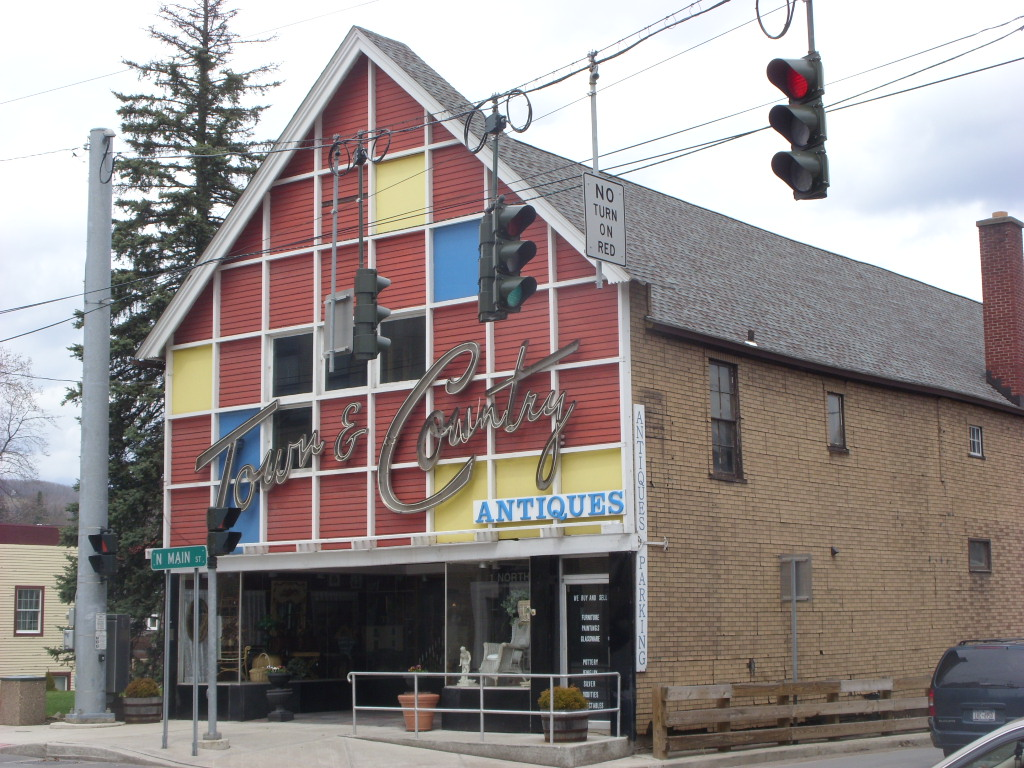
- Town and Country Building, April 2009

- Location within New York Location within the United States
- Location: 1 N. Main St., Liberty, New York
- Coordinates: 41°47′59″N 74°44′45″W
- Area: less than one acre
- Built: 1913
- Architectural style: Moderne
- NRHP reference No.: 04001061
- Added to NRHP: September 24, 2004

The Town and Country Building (also known as the Lyric Theatre (before 1913) and New Lyric Theatre (ca. 1913-ca. 1925) is a historic commercial building located at Liberty in Sullivan County, New York.

== Description and history ==
It was built in about 1890 as a combination meeting hall and retail space and has been occupied by a series of stores, theatres, and social groups. The last substantive exterior renovation was about 1950 when it received the current "googie"-style façade. The building consists of two large rectangular blocks. The front block is two and one half stories tall and seven bays deep, surmounted by a gable roof. The rear block was built about 1950 and is one and one half stories tall, five bays deep, constructed of concrete block and surmounted by a broad gable roof. The Town and Country Men's and Boy's Clothing Store occupied the storefront for 50 years until the 1990s.

It was added to the National Register of Historic Places in 2004. Allan Bérubé (1946–2007) helped to save the building.
