= Moondance Diner =

Diner in New York City (1933–2012)

Coordinates: 40°43′22.2″N 74°00′17.6″W

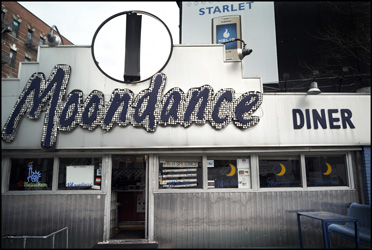
The Moondance Diner in May 2007, only the edge of the revolving crescent moon is shown.

The Moondance Diner was a diner in the SoHo neighborhood of Manhattan, New York City. Frequently shown or alluded to in film and television productions, it operated from 1933 to 2012 at 88 Sixth Avenue, between Grand Street and Canal Street.

== History ==
The restaurant opened in 1933 as the Holland Tunnel Diner. Like most diners of its vintage, it was built elsewhere and transported to its site. Measuring about 36 by 16 feet (11.0 by 4.9 m), it could seat about 34 people, with six tables and ten counter stools.

Around 1997, it was purchased by Sunis Sharma.

In 2007, the diner's operators announced that they would close the diner due to rising rent. Its demolition was set for August 1. Preservationists and the neighborhood's residents organized benefits for the diner.

In mid-2007, the diner was donated by Extell Development Company to the American Diner Museum in Providence, Rhode Island, which put it up for sale on its website before the structure was moved. In August, the diner was purchased from the museum by Vince and Cheryl Pierce, who spent $7,500 to buy the structure and another $40,000 to move it by semi-trailer truck some 2,400 miles (3,900 km) to La Barge, Wyoming. Within months, there were reports that the diner was unused and falling into dilapidation in its new site. During its first Wyoming winter, in January 2008, the diner's walls buckled and the entire roof caved in under the weight of ice and snow. The rotating moon sign, kept safe in storage, was undamaged. By March 2008, the diner was mostly repaired and restored, and was open for business six days a week. It was included in a late 2000s / early 2010s list of 51 "great burger joints" compiled by USA Today through reader suggestions.

As patronage declined with the local gas drilling industry, the diner closed in March 2012, and by July was again put up for sale. As of 2023, the diner remains in La Barge, vacant and with its iconic sign in storage. Cheryl Pierce and current owner John Montierth, who bought it in a tax sale but remains in contact with the Pierces, have proposed potential futures. Pierce has pitched moving and reopening it in a more populous area, while Montierth hopes to eventually reopen it in its current location, to take advantage of a recent upturn in the La Barge economy with the construction of the nearby TerraPower nuclear plant.

While condominiums were announced to be built on the diner's former site in New York, the James Hotel went in instead.

== In popular culture ==
- In the television sitcom Friends, the character Monica Geller (Courteney Cox) worked at the Moondance Diner, which was depicted as a 1950s theme restaurant with singing waitstaff (akin to the real-life Ellen's Stardust Diner). However, the show was filmed in Los Angeles, and only the exterior shots depicted the real diner.
- The diner is featured prominently in the 1985 movie After Hours.
- The diner appears in the 1987 Equalizer episode "High Performance", where McCall meets a murder witness looking for his help.
- In the 2005 rockumentary film The Naked Brothers Band: The Movie, six-year-old Alex faints on the counter of Moondance Diner after drinking and spilling cans of soda all over himself.
- The cable television series Sex and the City featured scenes shot at the Moondance Diner.
- In the 2002 film Spider-Man, the Moondance Diner appears as the diner at which Mary Jane Watson (Kirsten Dunst) is employed.
- In a-ha's music video for its 1988 single "You Are the One", the band enters the diner.
- The diner appears in the Miami Vice episode "The Prodigal Son".
- The diner appears in Reading Rainbow season 3 episode 9, "Animal Cafe".
- The diner can be seen in Law & Order: Special Victims Unit season 5 episode 21, "Criminal".
- Jonathan Larson's time working at the diner is portrayed in his musical Tick, Tick... Boom!, and its 2021 film adaptation. The diner is the subject of the song "Sunday", a parody of the song of the same name from Stephen Sondheim's Sunday in the Park with George.

== Staff ==
- American composer and playwright Jonathan Larson was a waiter for ten years at the Moondance Diner.
- Actor Jesse L. Martin met fellow waiter Larson at the Moondance Diner and later starred as Tom Collins in Larson's stage and film versions of the musical Rent.

== See also ==
- Empire Diner – Restaurant in Manhattan, New York
- Munson Diner – Historic commercial building in New York, United States
