= Poirier's Diner =

- Poirier's Diner, West Side Diner
- U.S. National Register of Historic Places
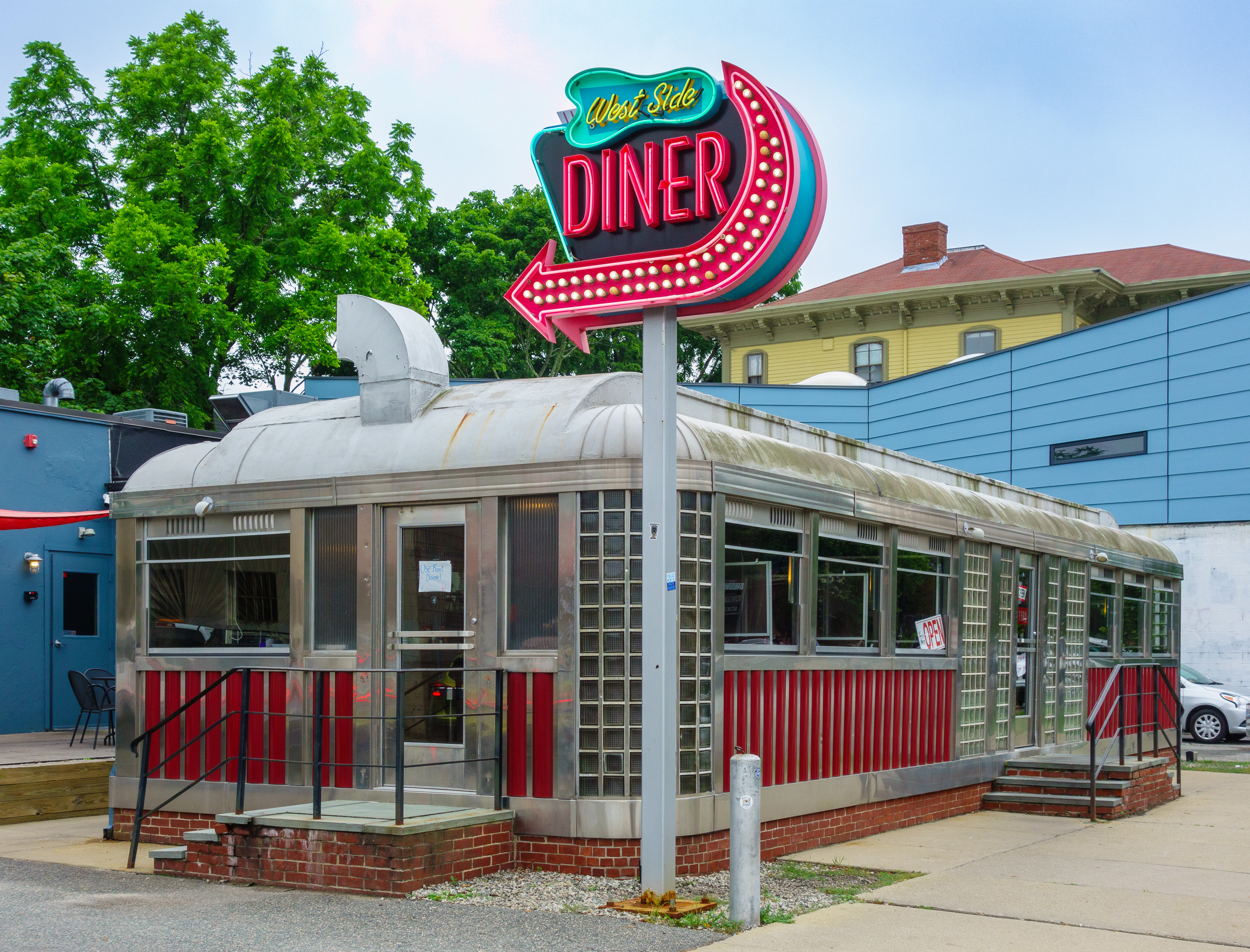

- Location within Rhode Island Location within the United States
- Location: Providence, Rhode Island
- Coordinates: 41°48′58.647″N 71°25′55.2246″W
- Built: 1947
- Architect: Kullman Dining Car Company
- Website: westsidedinerri.com
- NRHP reference No.: 03000657
- Added to NRHP: July 17, 2003

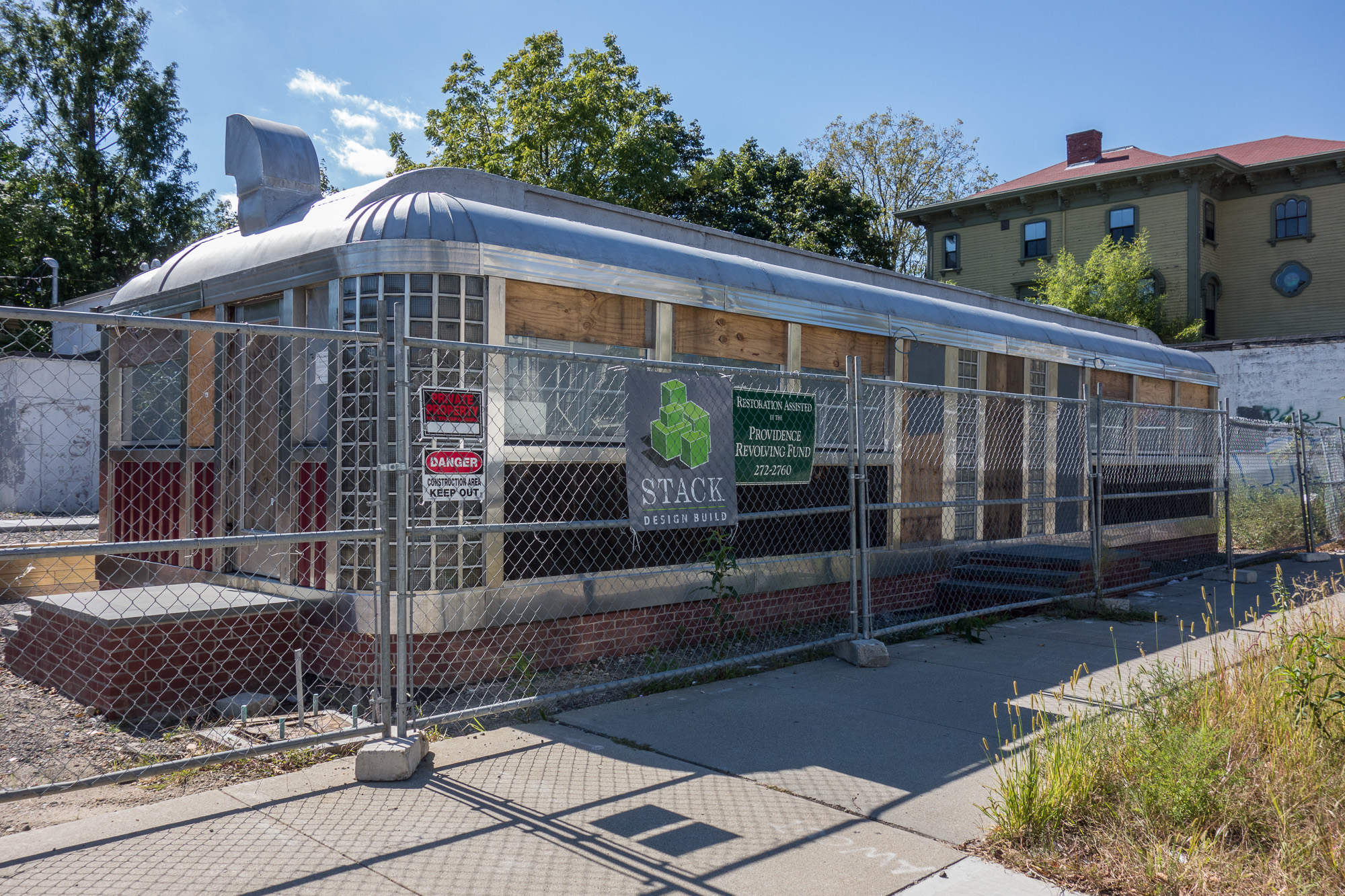
The diner during renovations in 2012

West Side Diner, formerly Poirier's Diner, is a historic restaurant at 1380 Westminster Street in Providence, Rhode Island.

== History ==
The diner was built in 1947 by Kullman Dining Car Company, and is a typical Art Deco streamlined stainless steel structure. It is one of two surviving Kullman diners in the state. The diner was originally located at 579-581 Atwells Avenue, an industrial area, where it operated for many years. The diner closed in 1999.

In 2002, the diner was forced off its land by redevelopment activity and placed in storage at 1467 Westminster Street. It was listed on the National Register of Historic Places in 2003.

The diner was moved to 1380 Westminster Street in 2011, and was reopened as the West Side Diner in 2013.

== See also ==
- National Register of Historic Places listings in Providence, Rhode Island
- List of diners
