= Litza Bixler =

British film choreographer

- Born: Litza Jean Bixler; August 25, 1970 (age 55); Colorado, USA
- Occupations: Film Choreographer, choreographer, writer, Artistic Director, Director
- Years active: 1994–present
- Website: https://www.litzabixler.com

Litza Bixler (born August 25, 1970) is an American and British film choreographer, Artistic Director and Writer. She is best known for her work with Edgar Wright on The World's End, Scott Pilgrim vs. the World and Shaun of the Dead. Other films with the Wright/Frost/Pegg stable include Nick Frost's salsa comedy Cuban Fury and the romantic comedy Man Up (starring Simon Pegg).

Other film and TV projects include Peaky Blinders (TV Series), the musical show The Lodge for The Disney Channel, the romantic comedy I Give It a Year and the musical film Walking On Sunshine (previously titled Holiday!), featuring British singer Leona Lewis.

== Early life ==
Litza was raised in southern Colorado. Initially, she trained as a visual artist and studied Fine Art at the University of Colorado Boulder. Having danced seriously since the age of 12, she gradually shifted her focus from illustrative art to performance. After completing an undergraduate degree in Performance Studies, she received her master's degree in Choreography, Ethnochoreology, and Dance Theory from the University of Surrey in 1995.

== Career ==
=== Early work ===
Litza created her first professional piece of choreography at the age of 16. In 1996, she choreographed and performed Position Over Eyes, the first piece with her company Litzabixler Performance. She created three more pieces for the company; So Low, Moving Stills, and Pistola Junta before closing the company to focus on her film work.

=== Other work ===
Other work includes NVA's Speed of Light; a large site-specific piece featuring choreographed runners in light suits that opened the Edinburgh Festival in 2012, as well as choreography for numerous adverts and music videos. Litza worked with Ministry of Sound to create her own fitness DVD in 2006. She also writes and paints and is a certified Creativity Coach.

=== Upcoming Projects ===
Litza has written an original musical screenplay and is currently working on a Gothic horror novel and a children's adventure screenplay.

== Filmography ==
=== Films ===
Year	Film	Role	Notes
2015	Legend (film)	Choreographer	Director: Brian Helgeland
2015	Man Up	Choreographer	Director: Ben Palmer
2014	Walking On Sunshine	Choreographer	Director: Max Giwa and Dania Pasquini
2013	Cuban Fury	Choreography Producer / Dance Fight Choreographer	Director: James Griffith Stunt/Fight Coordinator: Brad Allan
2013	The World's End	Choreographer / Movement Director	Director: Edgar Wright, Stunt/Fight Coordinator: Brad Allan
2012	I Give It a Year	Choreographer	Director: Dan Mazer
2010	Scott Pilgrim vs. the World	Choreographer	Director: Edgar Wright, Stunt/Fight Coordinator: Brad Allan
2010	Soulboy	Choreographer	Director: Shimmy Marcus
2009	The Boat that Rocked	Choreographer	Director: Richard Curtis
2008	Easy Virtue	Choreographer	Director: Stephan Elliott
2008	Wild Child	Choreographer	Director: Nick Moore
2005	Piccadilly Jim	Choreographer	Director: John McKay
2004	Alfie	Choreographer	Director: Charles Shyer
2003	Shaun of the Dead	Choreographer / Kissing Zombie (uncredited) / Movement Director	Director: Edgar Wright
1999	Whatever Happened to Harold Smith?	Choreographer	Director: Peter Hewitt

=== Short Films and Television ===
Year	Title	Role	Notes
2016	The Lodge	Head Choreographer	One Season, Disney Channel: Directors: Matt Bloom, Dez McCarthy
2015	Peaky Blinders	Choreographer	Season Two, One Episode: Director: Colm McCarthy
2013	Opponent	Executive Producer	Random Acts for Channel 4 (UK TV), Director: Charlotte Ginsborg
2013	Magpie	Executive Producer, Choreography Producer	Music Video / Short film for artist Khushi Director: Ryan Goodman
2013	Watching Copelia	Director / Choreographer	Short Film / Super 16 featuring dancer Lorena Randi
2007	Poppy Shakespeare	Choreographer	Film for Channel 4 (UK) Director: Benjamin Ross
2007	Don't	Zombie Flapper (uncredited)	Fake Trailer for Grindhouse Director: Edgar Wright
2006	Bottled Up Bunny	Director / Choreographer / Producer	Short Film for NERFF charity film festival
2003	Heart Thief	Director / Choreographer / Dancer	Co-director Deveril, Short film for Channel 4 (UK TV)
1998	Pistola Junta	Director / Choreographer / Dancer	Short film for live performance piece
