= Liberty (village), New York =

Liberty, New York
- Village
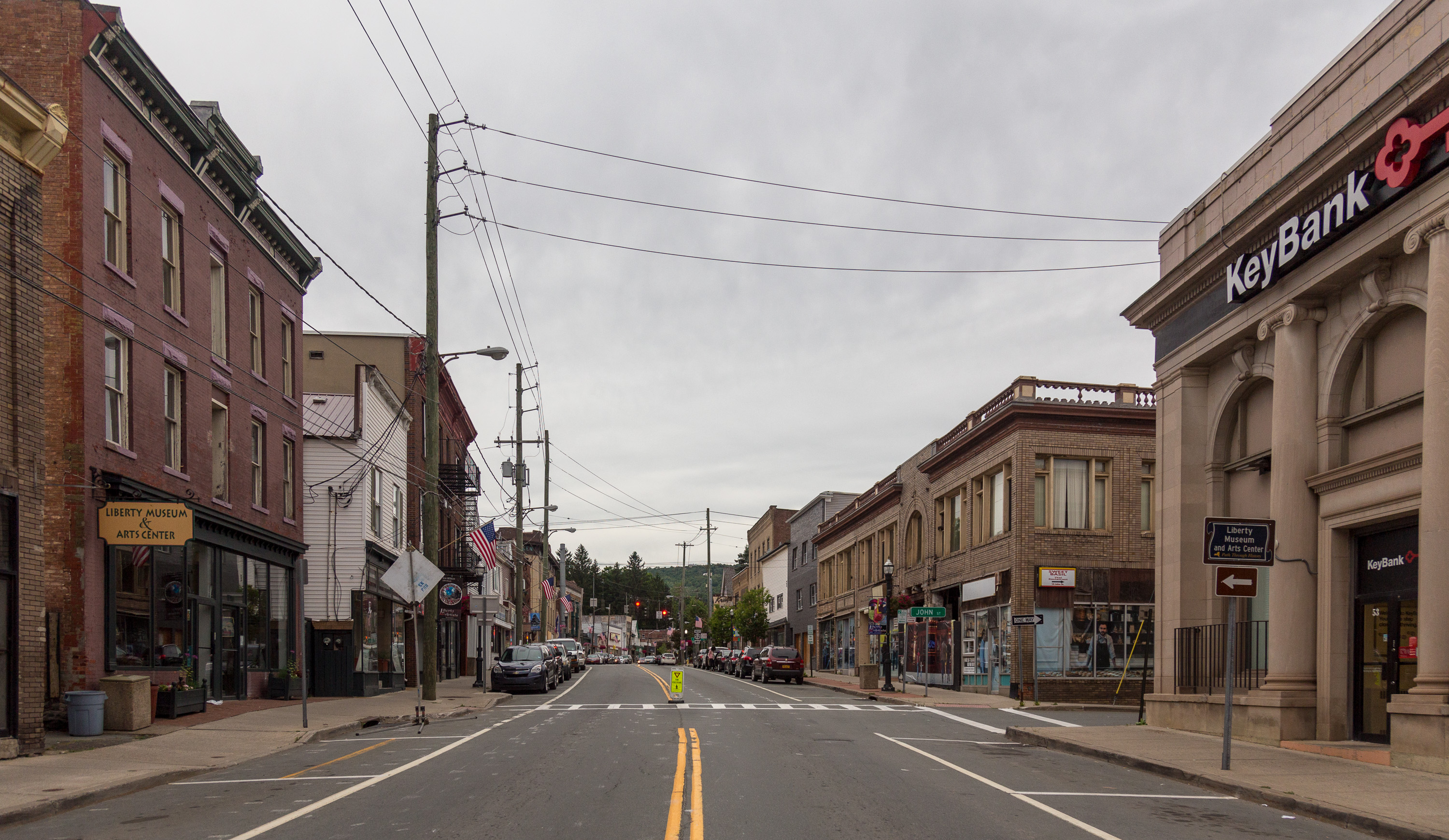
- Looking north on Main Street

- Location of Liberty village in Sullivan County, New York
- Coordinates: 41°48′N 74°44′W
- Country: United States
- State: New York
- County: Sullivan
- Town: Liberty
- Incorporated: 1870

Area
  - Total: 2.63 sq mi (6.80 km^{2})
  - Land: 2.62 sq mi (6.79 km^{2})
  - Water: 0.0039 sq mi (0.01 km^{2})
- Elevation: 1,506 ft (459 m)

Population (2020)
  - Total: 4,700
  - Density: 1,793.4/sq mi (692.44/km^{2})
- Time zone: UTC-5 (Eastern (EST))
  - Summer (DST): UTC-4 (EDT)
- ZIP code: 12754
- Area code: 845
- FIPS code: 36-42224
- GNIS feature ID: 2390940

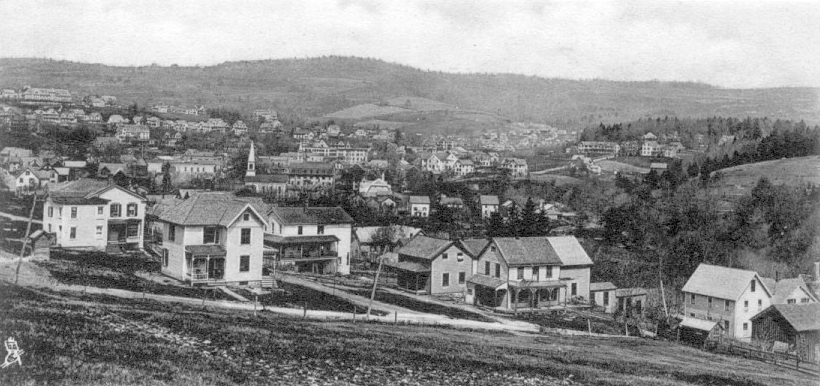
The village as shown on a postcard printed sometime from 1901 to 1907

Liberty is a village in Sullivan County, New York, United States. The population was 4,700 at the 2020 census.

The Village of Liberty is centrally located in the Town of Liberty and is adjacent to New York Route 17.

== History ==
While the Town of Liberty was incorporated in 1807, the Village of Liberty was not incorporated as a separate entity until 1870.

The Munson Diner, Liberty Downtown Historic District, St. Paul's Evangelical Lutheran Church, and Town and Country Building are listed on the National Register of Historic Places.

== Geography ==
Liberty is located at 41°47′52″N 74°44′34″W (41.797792, -74.742829).

According to the United States Census Bureau, the village has a total area of 2.4 square miles (6.2 km^{2}), all land.

== Demographics ==
Historical population
Census	Pop.	Note	%±
1880	478		—
1890	734		53.6%
1900	1,760		139.8%
1910	2,072		17.7%
1920	2,459		18.7%
1930	3,427		39.4%
1940	3,788		10.5%
1950	4,658		23.0%
1960	4,704		1.0%
1970	4,514		−4.0%
1980	4,293		−4.9%
1990	4,128		−3.8%
2000	3,975		−3.7%
2010	4,392		10.5%
2020	4,700		7.0%
U.S. Decennial Census

As of the census of 2000, there were 3,975 people, 1,646 households, and 893 families residing in the village. The population density was 1,660.3 inhabitants per square mile (641.0/km^{2}). There were 2,071 housing units at an average density of 865.0 per square mile (334.0/km^{2}). The racial makeup of the village was 76.58% White, 13.89% Black or African American, 0.30% Native American, 1.94% Asian, 5.38% from other races, and 1.91% from two or more races. Hispanic or Latino of any race were 14.21% of the population.

There were 1,646 households, out of which 30.1% had children under the age of 18 living with them, 32.8% were married couples living together, 16.5% had a female householder with no husband present, and 45.7% were non-families. 38.4% of all households were made up of individuals, and 17.2% had someone living alone who was 65 years of age or older. The average household size was 2.30 and the average family size was 3.09.

In the village, the population was spread out, with 25.5% under the age of 18, 7.3% from 18 to 24, 25.2% from 25 to 44, 23.4% from 45 to 64, and 18.6% who were 65 years of age or older. The median age was 40 years. For every 100 females, there were 84.0 males. For every 100 females age 18 and over, there were 79.7 males.

The median income for a household in the village was $27,903, and the median income for a family was $35,265. Males had a median income of $26,823 versus $27,813 for females. The per capita income for the village was $19,180. About 12.7% of families and 15.3% of the population were below the poverty line, including 13.5% of those under age 18 and 12.0% of those age 65 or over.

== Notable person ==
- Charles B. Ward, former US Congressman

== See also ==
- Munson Diner
