= Kullman Building Corporation =

American builder founded in Newark, New Jersey (1927)

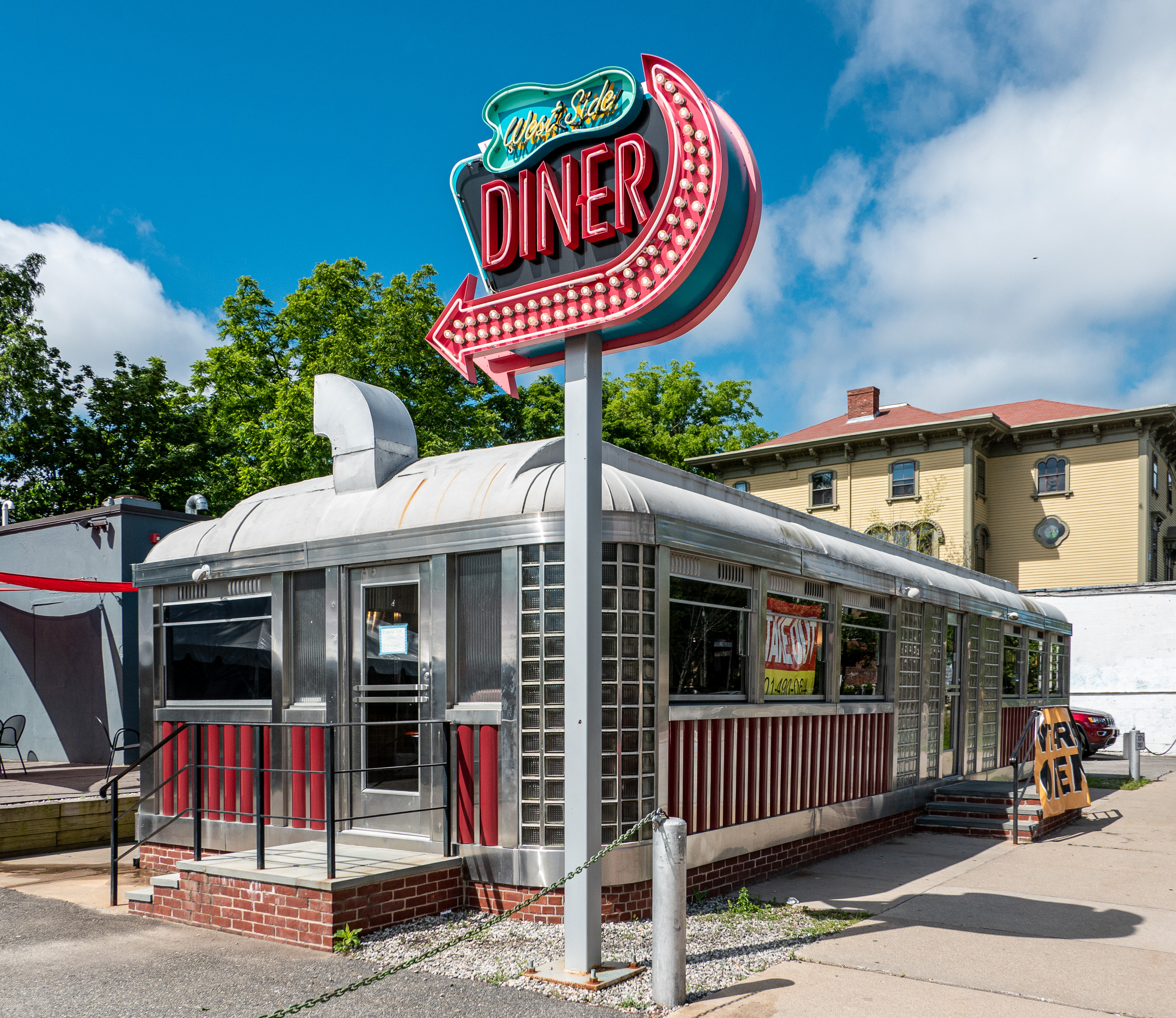
The West Side Diner in Providence, Rhode Island is a Kullman diner

Kullman Dining Car Company, established in Newark, New Jersey in 1927, originally manufactured diners. The company expanded and later became the Kullman Building Corporation. It relocated to Avenel and finally to Clinton Township (with corporate offices in Lebanon) and over the years production grew to include prefabricated housing, dormitories, prisons, schools, banks, equipment buildings of cellular communications towers. It also built the first pre-fabricated United States Embassy in Guinea-Bissau in West Africa. The company is known for incorporating the use of new materials, such as stainless steel and formica, as they were developed and applying technologies developed through construction of diners to other buildings and is credited with introducing the term accelerated construction The company re-organized in bankruptcy and Kullman Industries went out of business in 2011. XSite Modular, a company formed by the management team that left prior to Kullman going out of business, now owns all the Kullman Intellectual Property purchased at auction.

== Diners ==
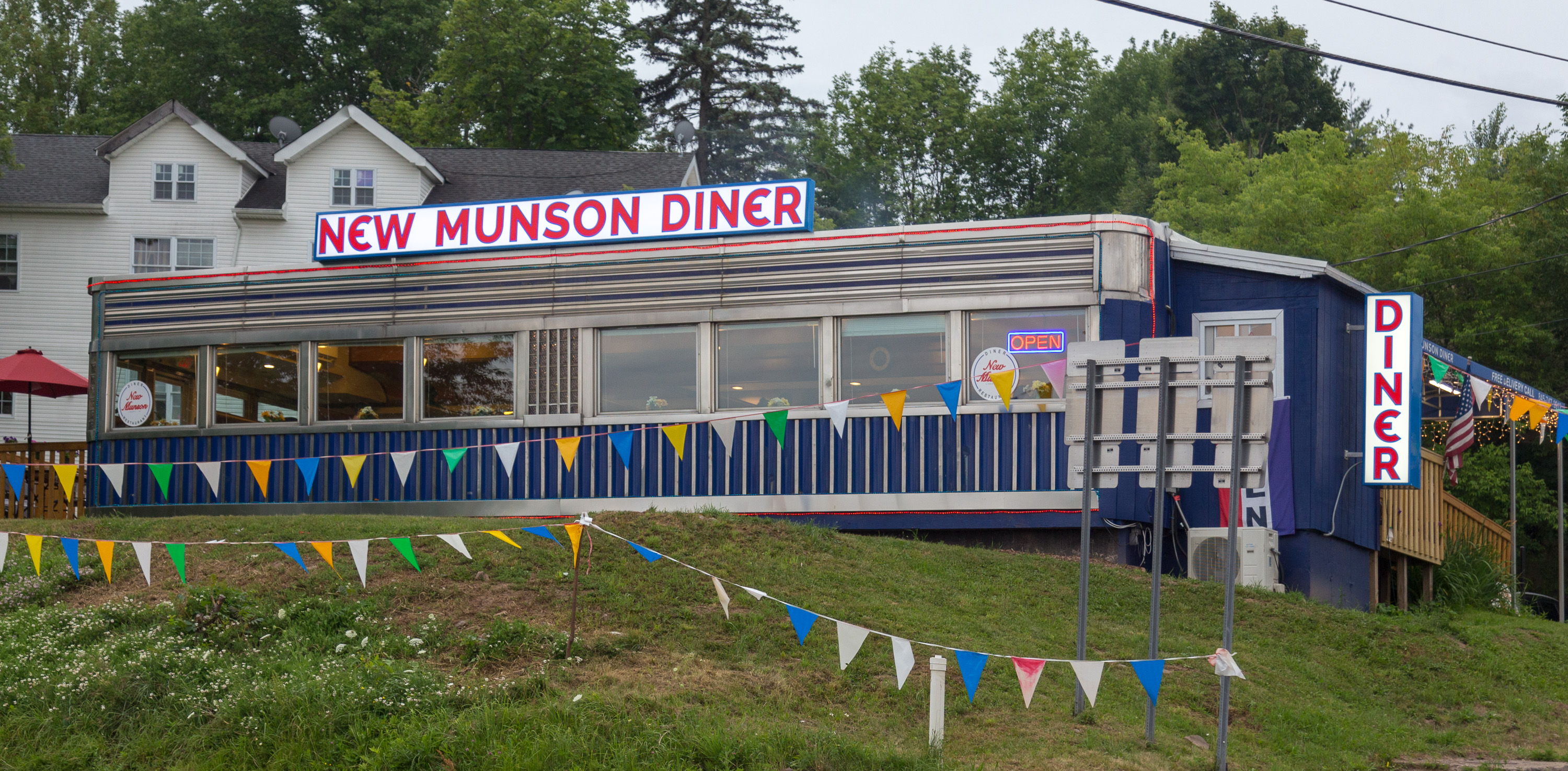
Munson Diner in Liberty, New York

New Jersey diners built by the company include:

Diner name	City	State	Status
Tick Tock Diner	Clifton	New Jersey	Open
Menlo Park Diner	Edison	New Jersey	Closed
Little Falls Diner	Little Falls	New Jersey	Closed, damaged by fire in 1995; actively being restored as of 2025
China 46	Ridgefield	New Jersey	Closed
White Rose System	Roselle	New Jersey	Open
Forked River Diner	Forked River	New Jersey	Open since 1984
USA Country Diner	Windsor	New Jersey	Closed; left vacant for over 10 years before other developments occurred
Prospect Diner	Columbia	Pennsylvania	Open

Poirier's Diner is on the National Register of Historic Places listings in Providence, Rhode Island. The Munson Diner, originally located on Eleventh Avenue in Manhattan was relocated in 2005 to Liberty, New York, and listed on NRHP in 2006. Sam's Diner in Kill Devil Hills, North Carolina was listed on the National Register of Historic Places in 1999.

The Birmingham Diner was located at US Rt1 and Rt202 referred to as Painters Crossroads until the 1960s until it was moved approximately 1.5 miles north, east side, of Rt 202. It remained there until the 1980s then was moved to Truckee California and is now known as “Jax at the Tracks”. It was a Kullman 1949 model.

The company, as late as the 2000, brought on line new diner designs, including one recalling the industries early affiliation with railroad cars. The Blue Comet was a named passenger train operated by Central Railroad of New Jersey from 1929 to 1941 between the Jersey City and Atlantic City.

== Embassies ==
In 1994, Kullman built a United States embassy building at its plant in Avenel and shipped it to Bissau, Guinea-Bissau. It was the first construction of an American embassy in the US. Other embassy projects followed in Ashgabat, Turkmenistan and Bishkek, Kyrgyzstan. All were, built, shipped, and assembled by American personnel with security clearances, enabling the State Department avoid security risks sometimes encountered with on-site construction in foreign countries.

== Germany ==
A franchise in Germany affiliated with Kullman was established in 1997, and since has opened a number of restaurants in a number of cities such as Berlin, Kaiserslautern, Ludwigsburg and Regensburg. Called Sam Kullman's Diner, they are housed in diners built by the namesake and imported to bring the American diner experience to Germany.

== See also ==
- List of diners
