= Bixler Manufacturing Company =

Ohio maker of diners in 1930s

The Bixler Manufacturing Company was a diner manufacturing company. In Fremont and then Norwalk, Ohio it made diners from 1931 to 1937. The Bixler Diner was noted for its wide swath. The diners were characterized by their two wide double hung windows and barrel roof with a fancy profile at the ends.

== History ==
The company opened in the midst of the Great Depression by Louis C. Voelker. The units were manufactured in sections and shipped to locations in pieces which had to be assembled on-site. The diner's width of 16 feet made this a desirable design. The knocked-down construction allowed the units to be shipped in four foot wide sections. They took less than a month to assemble and prepare for use. In addition to their large size (any length in multiples of the four-foot sections), the Bixler was distinguishable by its barrel roof construction with characteristic end trim and also the modular double hung two-foot windows. Booths with tall partitions were standard.

Bixler required a 10% deposit with the order, 15% before shipping and the remainder in 35 equal payments. Diners were erected throughout the Northeast and as far west as St. Louis.

The Great Depression lingered, however, and the company foundered by 1937. Too few entrepreneurs could afford the deposit required (generally $500) along with paying to obtain and construct the plot, permits and foundations required.

== Survivors ==
The following is a list of Bixler Diners still in operation:

- Brasitas – New England's only operational Bixler Diner, located in Stamford, CT. It was previously called the Post Road Luncheonette and then the Pin Stripes Diner. This diner has been extensively remodeled and only retains some of the exterior features such as the outline of the barrel roof and the overall dimensions of the original structure.
- Al's Village Diner – East Syracuse, NY
- Miss Syracuse Diner – Syracuse, NY
- Auburn Diner – Auburn, NY
- Ocean House Restaurant – Croton-on-Hudson, NY

== See also ==
- List of diners
- Diners
