= Diner =

Type of casual restaurant

Diner on US Route 7, Canaan, Connecticut, 1976

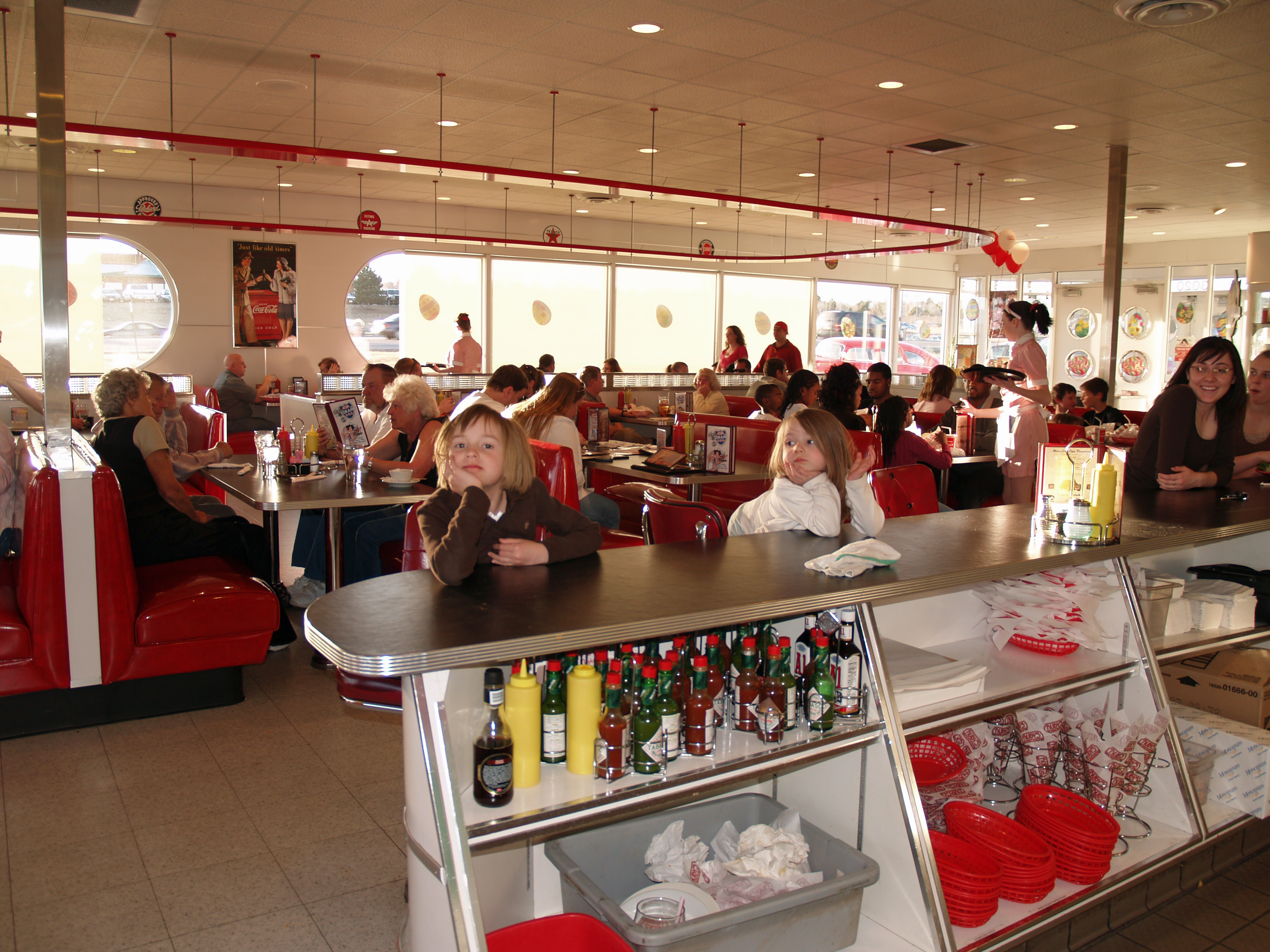
Ruby's Diner in Colorado Springs, 2008

A diner is a type of restaurant found across the United States and Canada, as well as parts of Western Europe and Australia. Diners offer mostly American cuisine, a casual atmosphere, and, typically, a combination of booths served by a waitstaff and a long sit-down counter with direct service, which in the smallest diners is provided simply by a cook. Many diners have extended hours, and some along highways and areas with significant shift work stay open for 24 hours.

Considered quintessentially American, many diners share an archetypal exterior form. Some of the earliest were converted rail dining cars, retaining their streamlined structure and interior fittings. From the 1920s to the 1940s, diners, by then commonly known as "lunch cars", were usually prefabricated in factories, like modern mobile homes, and delivered on site with only the utilities needing to be connected. As a result, many early diners were typically small and narrow to fit onto a rail car or truck. This small footprint also allowed them to fit into tiny and relatively inexpensive lots that were unable to support a larger enterprise. Diners were historically small businesses operated by the owner, with some presence of restaurant chains evolving over time.

Diners typically serve staples of American cuisine such as hamburgers, hot dogs, club sandwiches, french fries, onion rings, and other simple, quickly cooked, and inexpensive fare, such as meatloaf or steak. Much of the food is grilled, as early diners were based around a gas-fueled flattop grill. Coffee is a diner staple. Diners often serve milkshakes and desserts such as pies, cake, baklava or ice cream. Comfort food cuisine draws heavily from, and is deeply rooted in, traditional diner fare. Along with greasy spoon menu items, many diners will serve regional cuisine as well, such as clam chowder in New England and tacos in California.

Classic American diners often have an exterior layer of stainless steel siding, a feature unique to diner architecture. In some cases, diners share nostalgic, retro-style features also found in some restored drive-ins and old movie theatres.

== History ==
=== Precursors ===
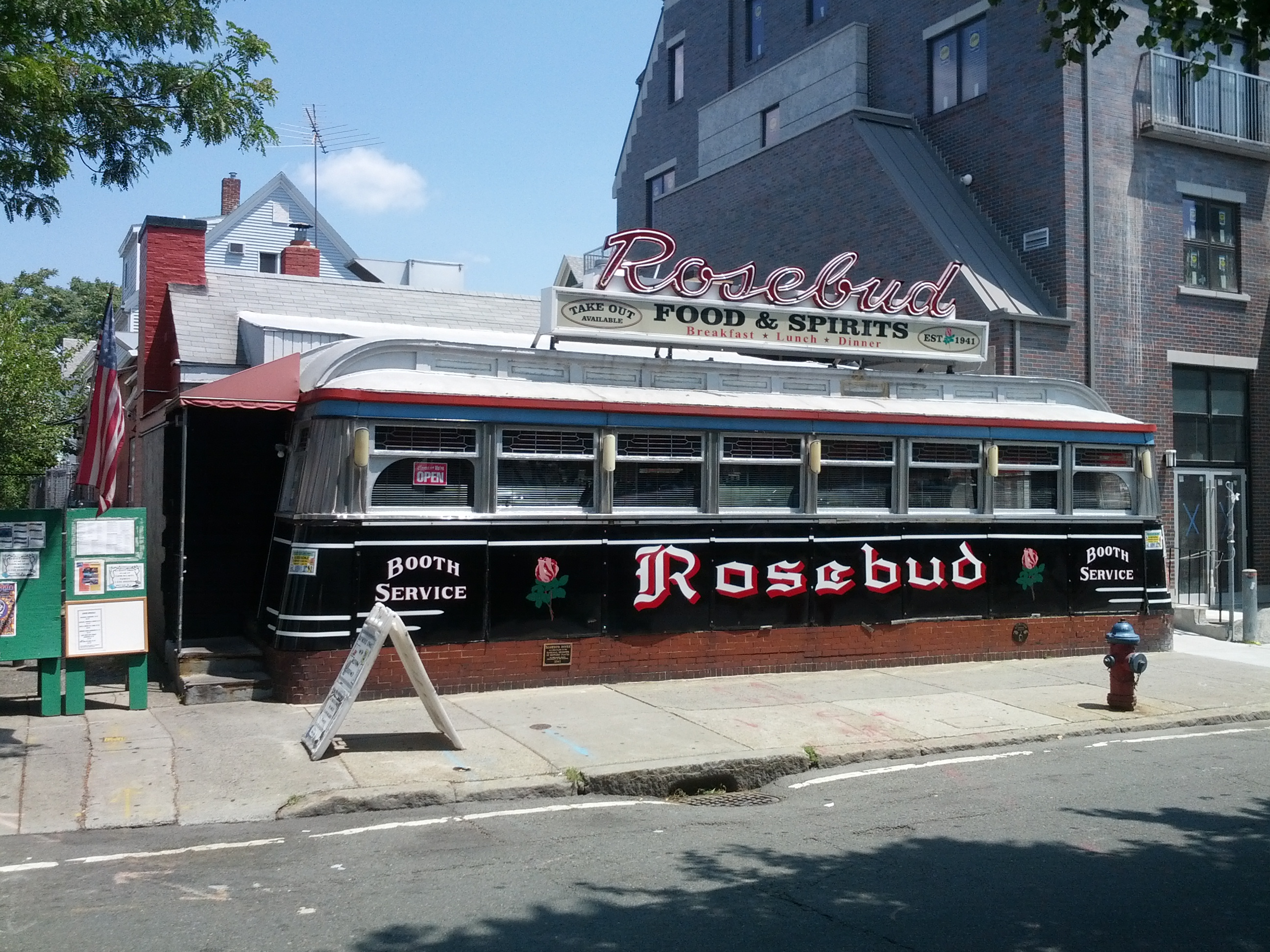
The Rosebud, a restored 1941 Worcester Lunch Car No. 773 in Somerville, Massachusetts

A crude precursor of the diner was created in 1872 by Walter Scott, who sold food out of a horse-pulled wagon to employees of the Providence Journal, in Providence, Rhode Island. Scott's diner can be considered the first diner with walk-up service, as it had windows on each side of the wagon. Commercial production of such "lunch wagons" began in Worcester, Massachusetts, in 1887, by Thomas Buckley. Buckley was successful and became known for his "White House Cafe" wagons. Charles Palmer received the first patent (1893) for the diner, (Note: US 497598A "Lunch-wagon") which he billed as a "Night-Lunch Wagon". He built his "fancy night cafes" and "night lunch wagons" in the Worcester area until 1901.

=== Prefabricated diners ===
As the number of seats increased, wagons gave way to pre-fabricated buildings made by many of the same manufacturers which had made the wagons. Like the lunch wagon, a stationary diner allowed one to set up a food service business quickly using pre-assembled constructs and equipment.

The Transfer Station neighborhood of Union City, New Jersey was the site, in 1912, of the first lunch wagon built by Jerry and Daniel O'Mahoney and John Hanf, which was bought for $800 and operated by restaurant entrepreneur Michael Griffin, who chose the location for its copious foot traffic. The wagon helped spark New Jersey's golden age of diner manufacturing, which in turn made the state the diner capital of the world. In the decades that followed, nearly all major US diner manufacturers, including Jerry O'Mahoney Inc., started in New Jersey. Jerry O'Mahony (1890–1969), who hailed from Bayonne, New Jersey, is credited by some to have made the first such "diner". The O'Mahony Diner Company of Elizabeth, New Jersey, produced 2,000 diners from 1917 to 1952. Only approximately twenty remain throughout the United States and abroad. Others credit Philip H. Duprey and Grenville Stoddard, who established the Worcester Lunch Car and Carriage Manufacturing Company in Worcester, Massachusetts, in 1906, when O'Mahony was still just 16.

Until the Great Depression, most diner manufacturers and their customers were located in the Northeast. Diner manufacturing suffered with other industries during the Depression, though not as much as many industries, and the diner offered a less expensive way of getting into the restaurant business as well as less expensive food than more formal establishments. After World War II, as the economy returned to civilian production and the suburbs boomed, diners were an attractive small business opportunity. During this period, diners spread beyond their original urban and small town market to highway strips in the suburbs, even reaching the Midwest, with manufacturers such as Valentine. After the Interstate Highway System was implemented in the US in the 1960s, diners saw a boom in business as mobile travelers would stop for a meal.

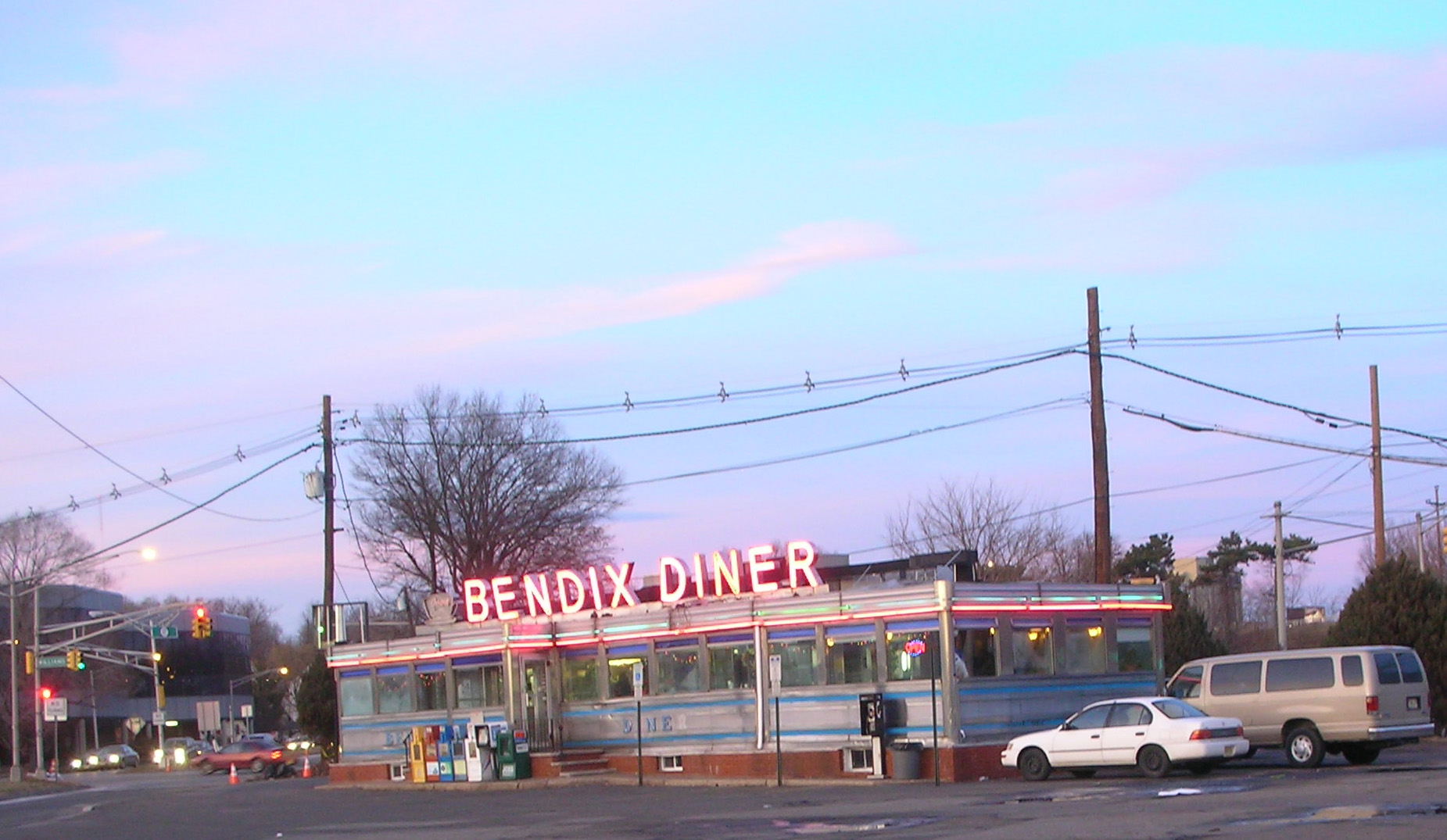
The Bendix Diner in Hasbrouck Heights, New Jersey

In many areas, diners were superseded in the 1970s by fast food restaurants, but in parts of New Jersey, New York, the New England states, Delaware, and Pennsylvania, the independently owned diner remains relatively common. Since the 1970s, most newly constructed diners lack the original narrow, stainless steel, streamlined appearance, and are usually much bigger buildings, though some are still made of several prefabricated modules, assembled on site, and manufactured by the old line diner builders. A wide variety of architectural styles were now used for these later diners, including Cape Cod and Colonial styles. The old-style single module diners featuring a long counter and a few small booths sometimes now grew additional dining rooms, lavish wallpaper, fountains, crystal chandeliers and Greek statuary. The definition of the term "diner" began to blur as older, prefabricated diners received more conventional frame additions, sometimes leaving the original structure nearly unrecognizable as it was surrounded by new construction or a renovated facade. Businesses that called themselves diners but which were built onsite and not prefabricated began to appear. These larger establishments were sometimes known as diner-restaurants.

==== Manufacturers ====
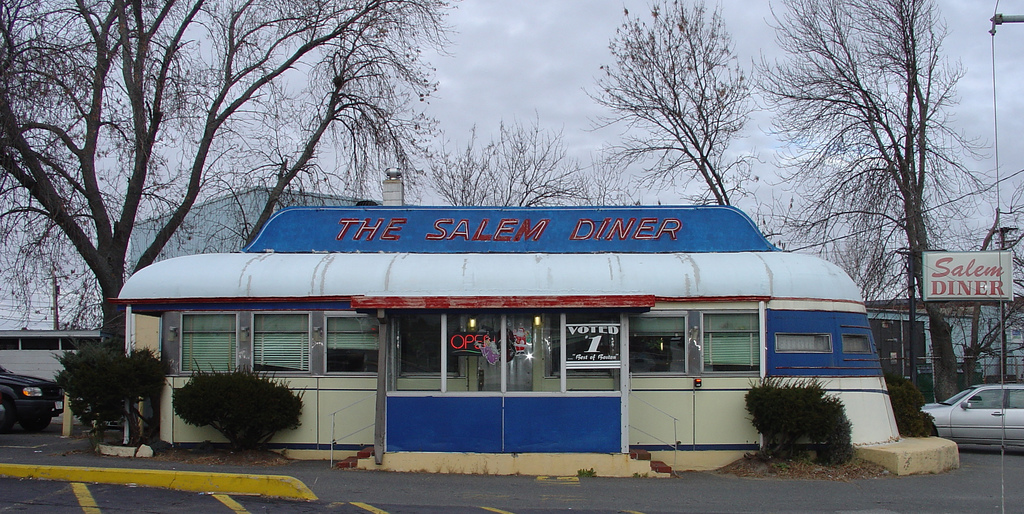
The Salem Diner in Salem, Massachusetts

- Bixler Manufacturing Company
- DeRaffele Manufacturing Co. Inc
- Fodero Dining Car Company
- Jerry O'Mahony Diner Company
- Kullman Dining Car Company
- Mountain View Diners Company
- Silk City Diners
- Tierney Dining Cars
- Worcester Lunch Car Company
- Sterling Streamliner Diners

Inspired by the streamlined trains, and especially the Burlington Zephyr, Roland Stickney designed a diner in the shape of a streamlined train called the Sterling Streamliner in 1939. Built by the J. B. Judkins coach company, which had built custom car bodies, the Sterling and other diner production ceased in 1942 at the beginning of American involvement in World War II. Two Sterling Streamliners remain in operation: the Salem Diner at its original location in Salem, Massachusetts and the Modern Diner in Pawtucket, Rhode Island.

== Architecture ==
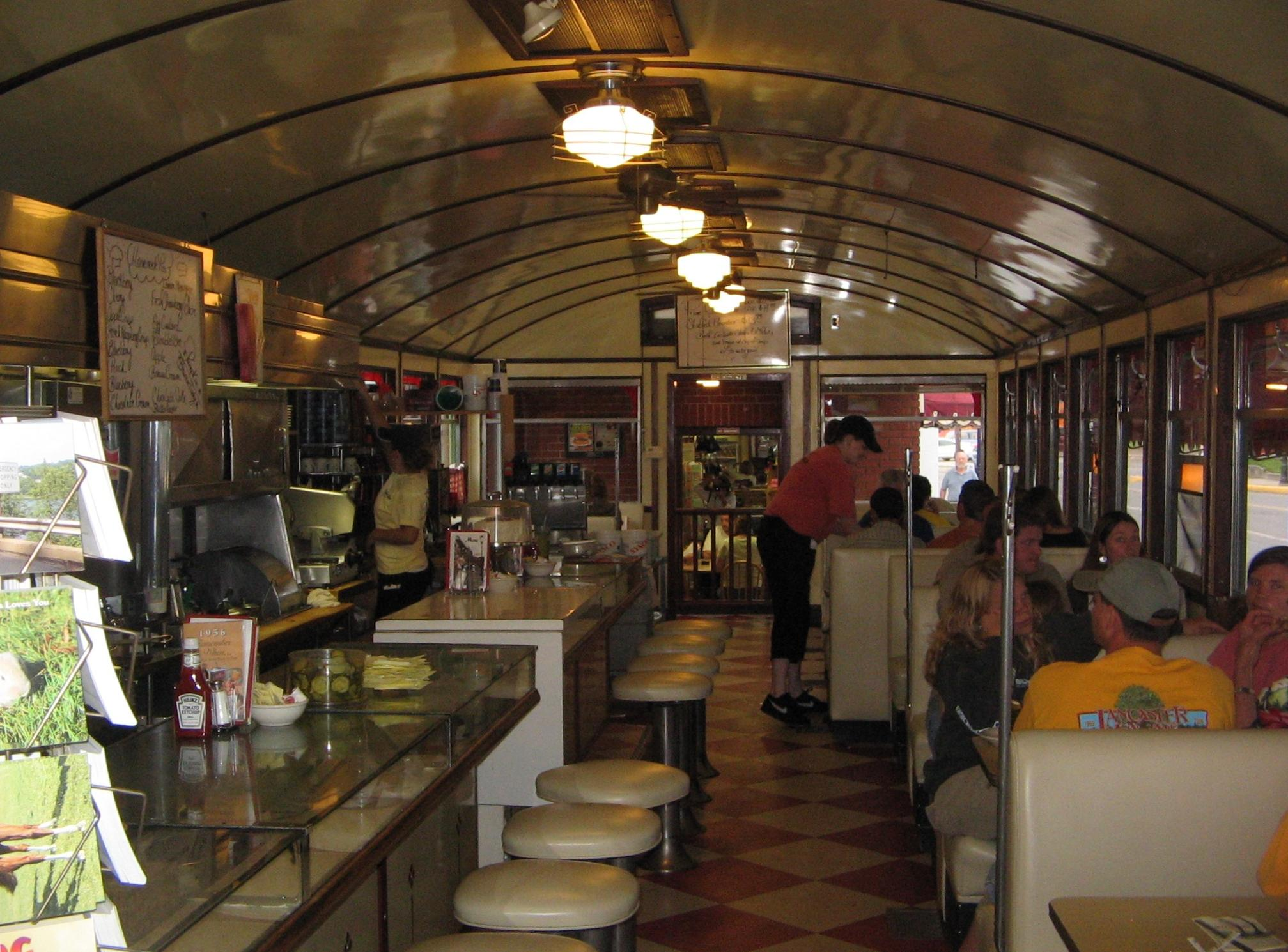
Interior of a 1938 Sterling manufactured diner, with curved ceiling, in Wellsboro, Pennsylvania

Customers in a diner in approximately the 1950s

Like a mobile home, the original style diner is narrow and elongated and allows roadway or railway transportation to the restaurant's site. In the traditional diner floorplan, a service counter dominates the interior, with a preparation area against the back wall and floor-mounted stools for the customers in front. Larger models may have a row of booths against the front wall and at the ends. The decor varied over time. Diners of the 1920s–1940s feature Art Deco or Streamline Moderne elements or copy the appearance of rail dining cars (though very few are, in fact, refurbished rail cars). They featured porcelain enamel exteriors, some with the name written on the front, others with bands of enamel, others in flutes. Many had a "barrel vault" roofline. Tile floors were common. Diners of the 1950s tended to use stainless steel panels, porcelain enamel, glass blocks, terrazzo floors, Formica, and neon sign trim. Diners built in the 2000s generally have a different type of architecture; they are laid out more like restaurants, retaining some aspects of traditional diner architecture (stainless steel and Art Deco elements, usually) while discarding others (the small size, and emphasis on the counter).

== Cuisine ==
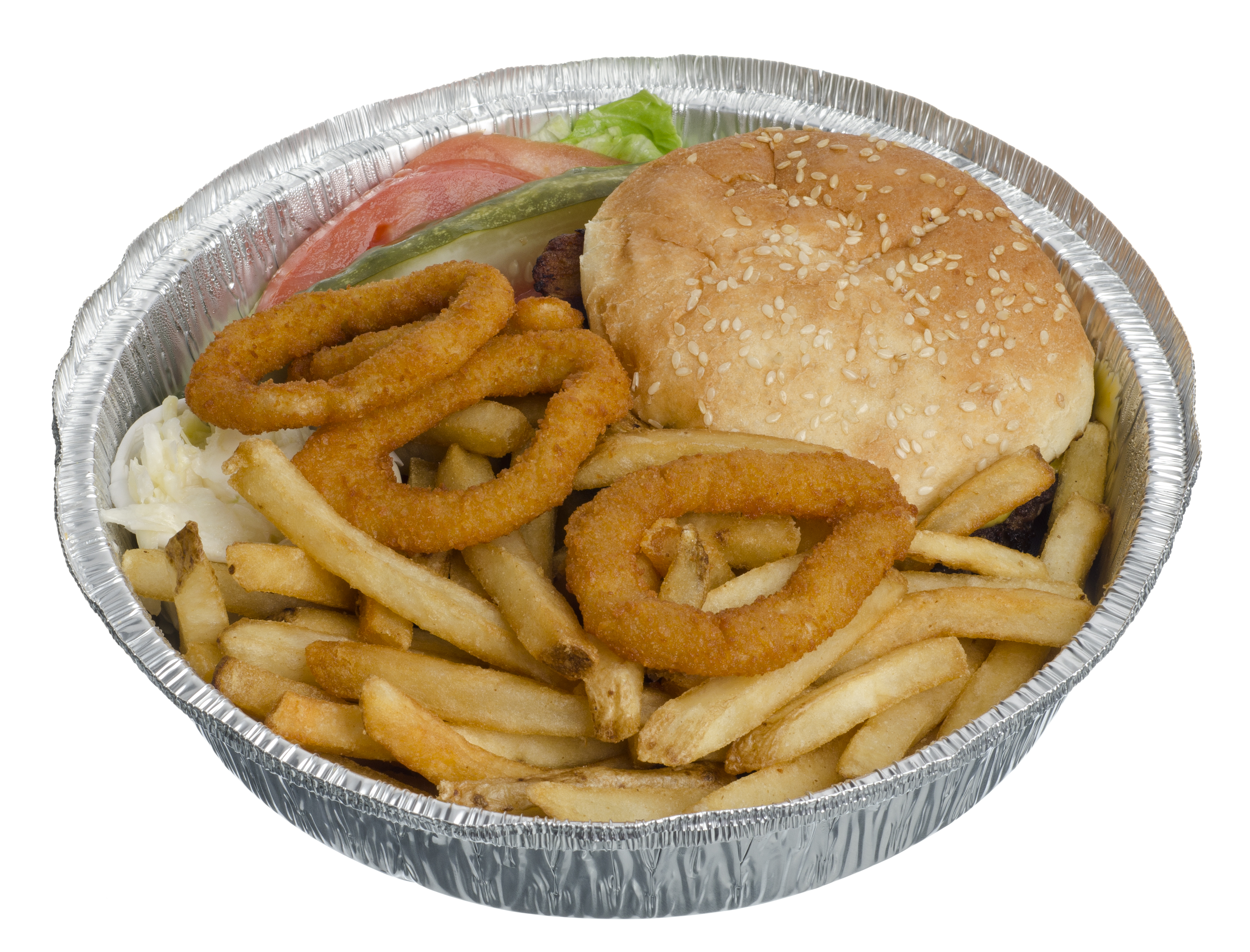
A bacon cheeseburger from a New York City diner in a to-go container, with a pickle slice, onion rings, coleslaw and French fries

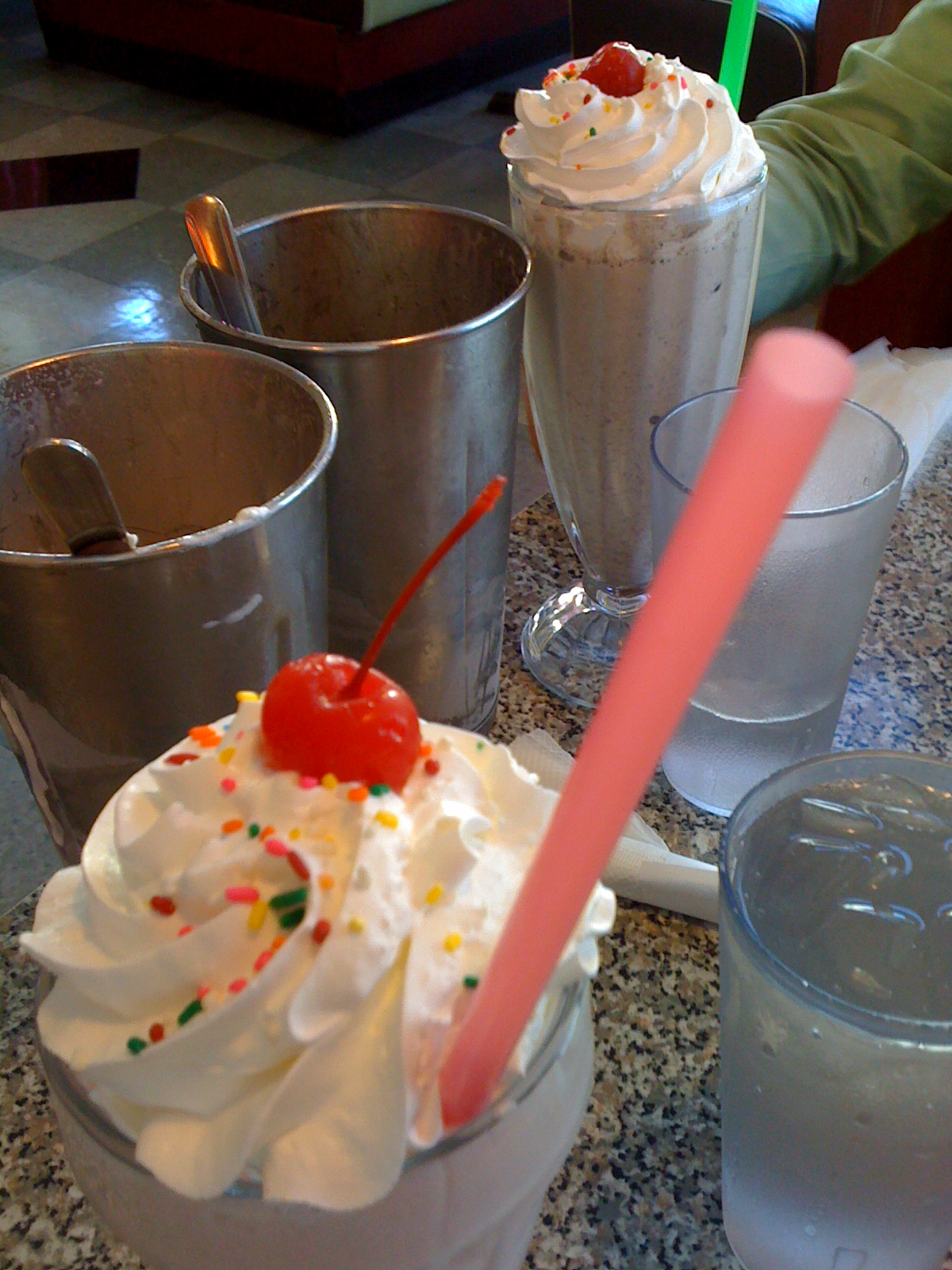
Many diners serve a metal cup alongside a milkshake, containing what cannot fit in the glass.

Many diners serve casual inexpensive food, such as hamburgers, french fries, and sandwiches. Much of the food is grilled, as early diners were based around a grill. There is often an emphasis on breakfast foods such as eggs including omelets, waffles, pancakes, and french toast. Some diners serve these "breakfast foods" throughout the business day and others that focus on breakfast may close in the early afternoon. These are most commonly known as pancake houses. Coffee is ubiquitous at diners. Many diners do not serve alcoholic drinks.

Diners have become known for diner lingo. The "blue plate special" is a large meal typically including meat, three to four sides, bread, and a drink offered together at a low price. The catering entrepreneur Fred Harvey is credited with launching this menu item, he founded America's first restaurant chain in the 1870s. There is regional variation among diners with traditional food. In the US, Michigan and the Ohio Valley at "Coney Island–style" restaurants, coney dogs are served, as are certain types of Greek cuisine like gyros influenced by Greek diner owners. In Indiana and Iowa, pork tenderloin sandwiches are often on the menu. The Northeast has more of a focus on seafood, with fried clams and fried shrimp commonly found in Maine and cheesesteak sandwiches and scrapple in Pennsylvania. Diners in the Southwestern US may serve tamales. In the Southern US, typical breakfast dishes include grits, biscuits and gravy, and soul food such as fried chicken and collard greens. In New Jersey, the "Taylor Ham, Egg, and Cheese Sandwich" is a feature of many diners. Many diners have transparent display cases in or behind the counter for the desserts. It is common with new diners to have the desserts displayed in rotating pie cases. Typical desserts include a variety of pies and cheesecake.

=== Immigrant influences ===
Several international ethnic influences have been introduced into the diner industry in the US, because of generations of immigration. Many diners in the United States—especially in the Northeast—are owned or operated by first- and second-generation Americans. Greek Americans, as well as Polish, Ukrainian, Eastern European Jews, Italian Americans, Mexicans and Cubans, have notable presences depending on the area. These influences can be seen in certain frequent additions to diner menus, such as Greek moussaka and Pastitsio, Slavic blintzes, and Jewish chicken soup with matzah balls, deli-style sandwiches (e.g., corned beef, pastrami, Reubens), and bagels and lox.

== Cultural significance ==
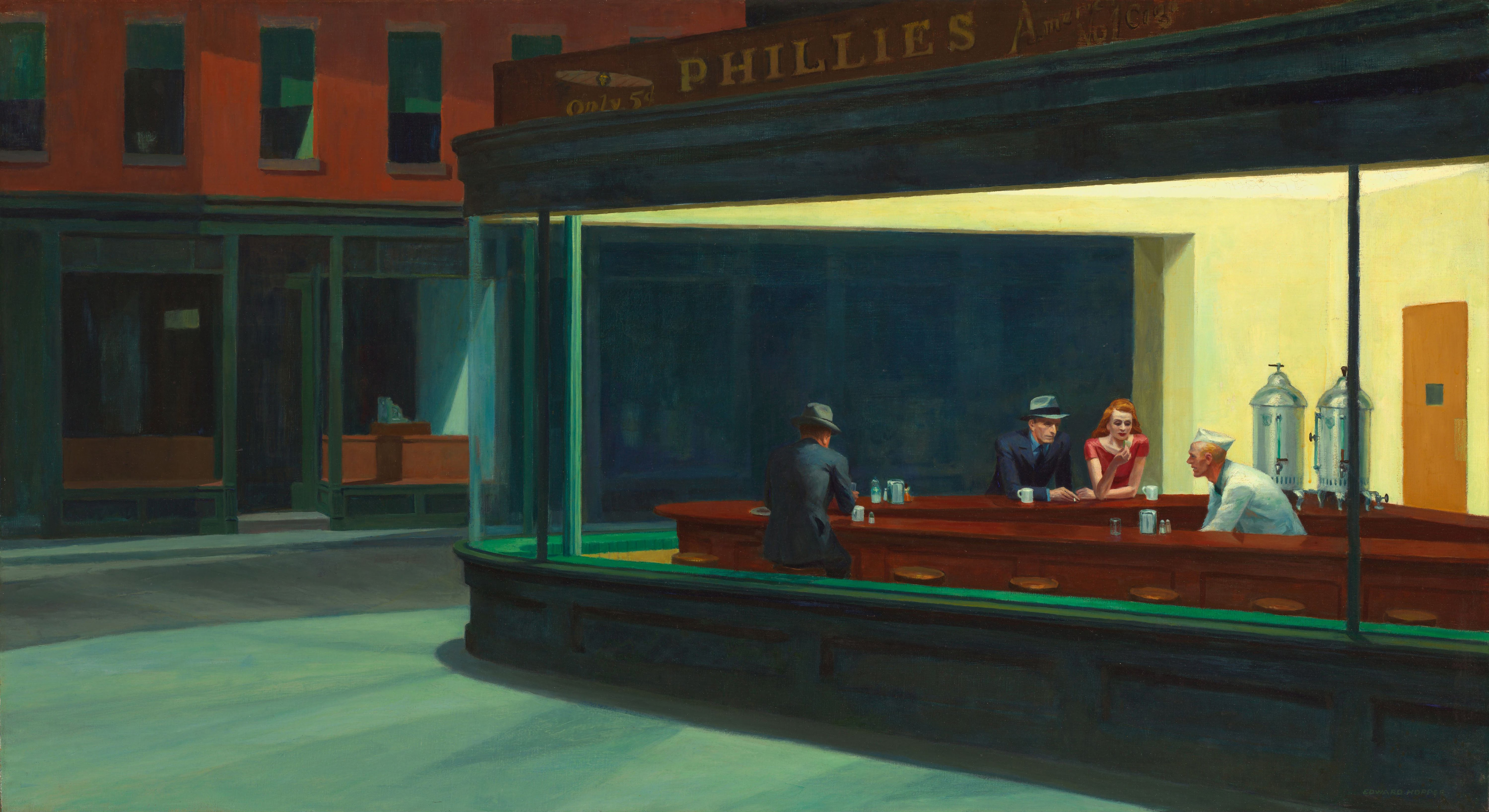
Edward Hopper's iconic Nighthawks (1942) captured the ambiance of an urban diner at night.

Diners attract a wide spectrum of the local populations, and are generally small businesses. From the mid-twentieth century onwards, they have been seen as quintessentially American, reflecting the perceived cultural diversity and egalitarian nature of the country at large. Throughout much of the 20th century, diners, mostly in the Northeast, were often owned and operated by Greek-American immigrant families. The presence of Greek casual food, like gyros and souvlaki, on several northeastern diners' menus, testifies to this cultural link.

Diners frequently stay open 24 hours a day, especially in cities, and were once the most widespread 24-hour public establishments in the US, making them an essential part of urban culture, alongside bars and nightclubs; these two segments of nighttime urban culture often find themselves intertwined, as many diners get a good deal of late-night business from persons departing drinking establishments. Many diners were also historically placed near factories which operated 24 hours a day, with night shift workers providing a key part of the customer base. For this reason, diners sometimes served as symbols of loneliness and isolation. Edward Hopper's iconic 1942 painting Nighthawks depicts a diner and its occupants, late at night. The diner in the painting is based on a real location in Greenwich Village, but was chosen in part because diners were anonymous slices of Americana, meaning that the scene could have been taken from any city in the country-and also because a diner was a place to which isolated individuals, awake long after bedtime, would naturally be drawn. The spread of the diner meant that by 1942 it was possible for Hopper to cast this institution in a role for which, fifteen years earlier, he had used an Automat all-night restaurant. The diner as an institution in this painting is a vignette mimicked by a movie lead-in aired nightly on the Turner Classic Movie Channel.

Norman Rockwell made his 1958 painting, The Runaway, generically American by placing his subjects, a young boy and a protective highway patrolman, at the counter of an anonymous diner. In television and cinema (e.g. The Blob, Happy Days, Grease and Diner), diners and soda fountains have come to symbolize the period of prosperity and optimism in America in the 1950s. They are shown as the place where teenagers meet after school and as an essential part of a date. The television show Alice used a diner as the setting for the program, and one is often a regular feature in sitcoms such as Seinfeld. The diner's cultural influence continues today. Many non-prefab restaurants (including franchises like Denny's) have copied the look of 1950s diners for nostalgic appeal, while Waffle House uses an interior layout derived from the diner.

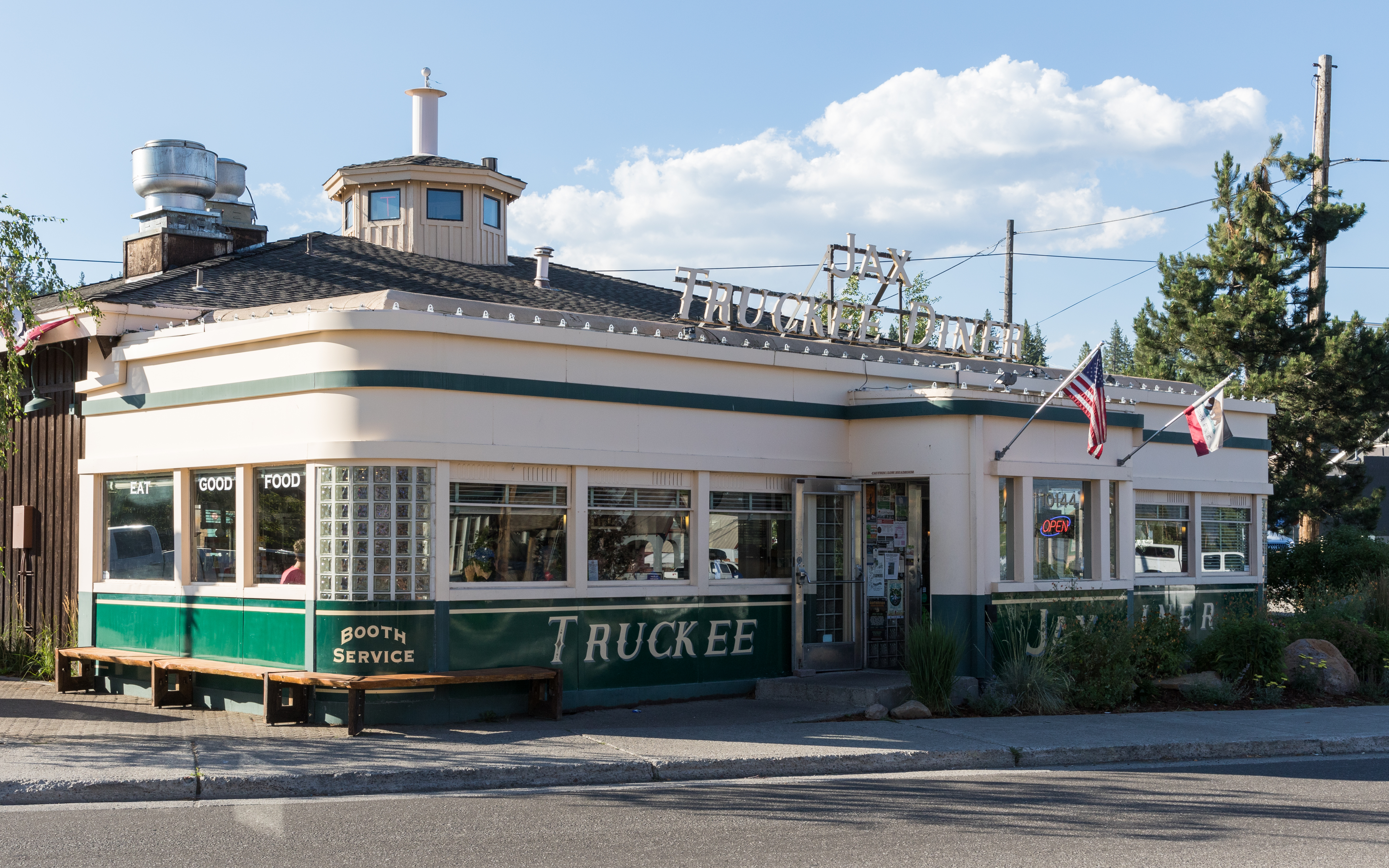
The diner Jax at the Tracks in Truckee, California, was featured in the food reality television series Diners, Drive-Ins and Dives in June 2010.

Manhattan was once known for its diners. The Moondance Diner was shipped to Wyoming to make room for development. Diners provide a nationwide, recognizable, fairly uniform place to eat and assemble, desirable traits mirrored by fast food chains. The types of food served are likely to be consistent, especially within a region (exceptions being districts with large immigrant populations, in which diners and coffee shops will often cater their menus to those local cuisines), as are the prices charged. At the same time, diners have much more individuality than fast food chains; the structures, menus, and even owners and staff, while having a certain degree of similarity to each other, vary much more widely than the more rigidly standardized chain and franchise restaurants. The Poirier's Diner and Munson Diner, both manufactured by the Kullman Dining Car Company of Lebanon, New Jersey, are listed on the National Register of Historic Places.

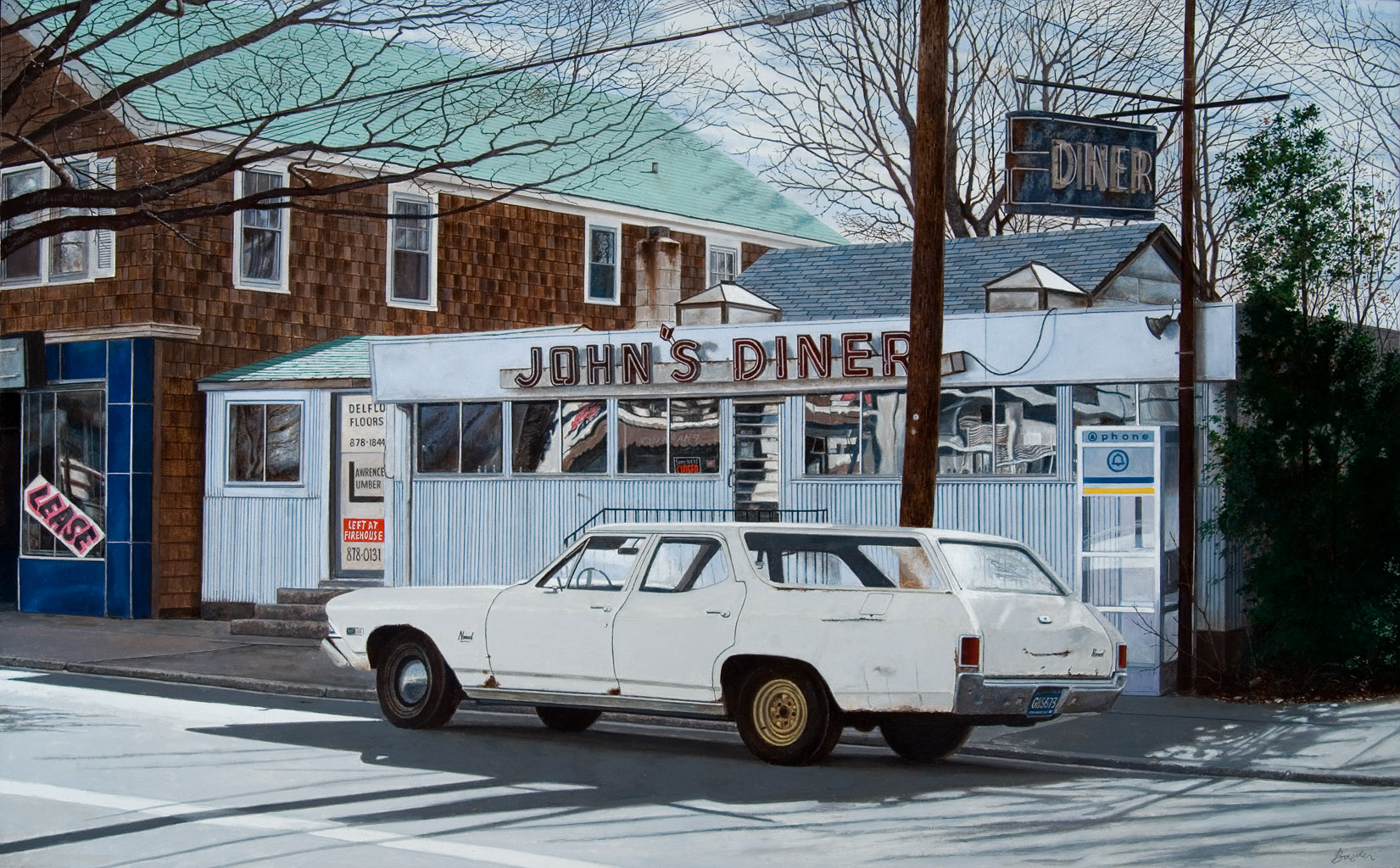
John Baeder, 2007, John's Diner with John's Chevelle

Diners have figured significantly in American films and television since the form developed. In I Love Lucy, the episode titled "The Diner" shows the perils, pitfalls, and difficulty in operating a diner, to much comedic effect. Archetypal appearances include significant scenes in classic films such as Sullivan's Travels and The Killers. The 1982 "rites of passage" film Diner was centered on an eatery shared by the protagonists. Waitress in 2007 was about a waitress in a diner. Television series include the Food Network show Diners, Drive-Ins, and Dives. Pennsylvania Diners and Other Roadside Restaurants, is a 1993 documentary. Diners are the focus of photorealist painter John Baeder who spent about 40 years painting diners across the US. In 1990, Williams Electronics Games introduced a pinball machine entitled Diner. The object of the game is to serve all customers to light-up Dine Time (the jackpot).

== See also ==
- Bistro, a small, inexpensive restaurant in France
- Cafe (British), a similar inexpensive restaurant in the United Kingdom
- Dhaba, a roadside diner in India
- Diner lingo, American verbal slang used by staff in diners
- List of diners, a list of notable diners in the US
- Lunch counter, a small diner-like restaurant located within another retail establishment
- Warung, cheap eatery in Indonesia
