= COVID-19 pandemic in Austin, Texas =

Ongoing COVID-19 viral pandemic in Austin, Texas

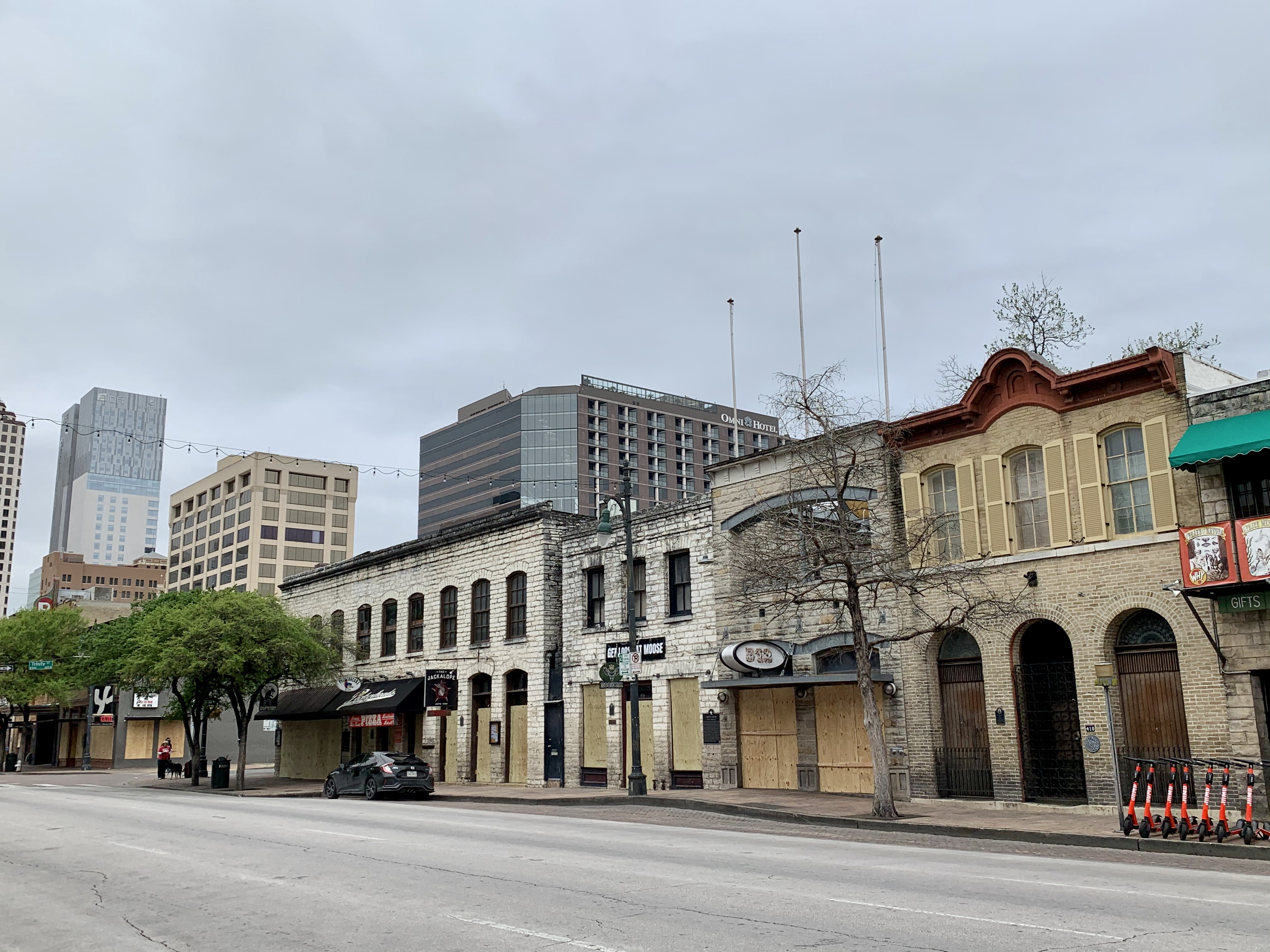
- Shuttered and closed businesses on Sixth Street on March 21, 2020
- Disease: COVID-19
- Pathogen: SARS-CoV-2
- Location: Austin, Texas
- First outbreak: Wuhan, Hubei, China
- Arrival date: March 13, 2020 (first confirmed); March 2, 2020 (first confirmed onset of symptoms)
- Date: March 13, 2020—present
- Confirmed cases: 56,825 (for Travis County)
- Active cases: 5,795 (for Travis County)
- Recovered: 50,457 (estimated)
- Deaths: 573 (for Travis County)

Government website
- www.austintexas.gov/covid19

Austin, Texas, reportedly confirmed its first cases on March 13, 2020, with the related onset of symptoms occurring as early as March 2, 2020. However, the disease may have reached the Austin area earlier. In an unconfirmed case, a 67 year old man in Bastrop, TX, traveled to Clovis, NM on December 21. He was hospitalized in Clovis on December 23, 2019, then transported via ambulance to Lubbock where he was placed on a ventilator. He declined rapidly and died on January 2, 2020. Though there was no testing available at the time, he exhibited classic symptoms of COVID-19. The first fatality associated with the disease was reported on March 27, 2020. As of January 21, 2021, the City of Austin (which reports its data in conjunction with Travis County) has reported over 50,000 cases of COVID-19, with 573 deaths associated with the disease.

The threat of COVID-19 prior to its confirmed arrival in the Austin area led to the issuance of a local disaster declaration on March 6, 2020, and the cancellation of South by Southwest for the first time in its history. Restrictions on gatherings and dining establishments and other mandatory protocols were issued by the municipal government and became more stringent in March 2020 following the first confirmed cases of COVID-19 and the ensuing rise in the disease's prevalence. Austin Public Health (APH) first reported evidence of community spread in the area on March 19, 2020. By the end of March 2020, a stay-at-home order had been issued, along with associated social distancing guidelines and operations changes affecting numerous Austin businesses.

In June–July 2020, the Austin area experienced a large increase in the spread of COVID-19, making it one of the U.S.'s most prominent hotspots for the pandemic. At one point, the Greater Austin metropolitan area had the highest positivity rate for the disease of any metropolitan area in the U.S. While restrictions remained in place in the following months, cases declined after July 2020 before another surge of the disease began towards the end of 2020.

== Overview ==
COVID-19 is a contagious respiratory disease caused by SARS-CoV-2. Although the first reported cases were contemporaneously confirmed in the Wuhan, Hubei, China, on December 31, 2019, a later study conducted by the Genetic Institute at the University College London indicate a possible origin as early as October 2019 via zoonosis. The rapid spread of the virus led to the COVID-19 pandemic.

On April 16, 2020, Austin Public Health (APH) reported over a thousand cases of COVID-19 within its jurisdiction. The cumulative number of reported cases exceeded 10,000 on July 1, 2020. Most of the 552 deaths confirmed so far are associated with older individuals, with 82 percent of deaths from individuals aged 60 or older. Based on 2019 mortality data, COVID-19 was the third leading cause of death in Travis County in 2020, behind cancer and heart disease.

=== Austin Public Health risk categories ===
On May 13, 2020, APH unveiled a set of risk-based guidelines for behavior organized into five color-coded stages, with stage 1 representing the lowest risk and stage 5 representing the highest risk. More stringent measures were recommended for individuals more susceptible to the disease. Austin began at stage 3 when the guidelines were released. The initial guidelines provided recommendations for business closures, but these were later changed to broader capacity suggestions applicable to all businesses. On May 28, APH provided recommended thresholds for its stages based on 7-day average hospitalizations in the Greater Austin metropolitan area. Transition into or out of stage 5 was recommended if 7-day average hospitalizations exceeded or decreased below 70.

Austin Public Health recommendations (November 13, 2020, edition)
Stage	Social distancing	Facial coverings	Higher-risk individuals (Note: Including people with diabetes; high blood pressure; heart, lung and kidney disease; immunosuppression; obesity; or persons aged 65 or older.)			General populace			Business capacity
Stage	Social distancing	Facial coverings	Gathering limits	Non-essential travel	Dining/shopping	Gathering limits	Non-essential travel	Dining/shopping	Business capacity
Stage 1 (green)			25 people		Avoid except with precautions				100%
Stage 2 (blue)	Yes	Yes	10 people		Avoid non-essential	25 people			75%
Stage 3 (yellow)	Yes	Yes	Non-social; 10 people	Avoid	Avoid non-essential	Non-social; 10 people			50–75%
Stage 4 (light orange)	Yes	Yes	Non-social; 2 people	Avoid	Avoid non-essential	Non-social; 10 people	Avoid		25–50%
Stage 5 (dark orange)	Yes	Yes	Within household only	Avoid	Avoid non-essential	Within household only	Avoid	Avoid non-essential	Contactless services only

== Timeline ==
=== Initial response and first shelter-in-place (January–April 2020) ===
==== Prior to confirmed onset ====
On January 22, 2020, APH tweeted that it was coordinating with the Centers for Disease Control (CDC) and the State of Texas to monitor and respond to any local outbreaks of COVID-19. On January 27, 2020, the University of Texas at Austin began banning its students from traveling to Wuhan following recommendations from the U.S. Department of State; at the time, there were fewer than 10 students studying abroad in China. Faculty, staff, and graduate student travel to China required committee review and authorization while undergraduate travel was prohibited. Towards the end of January 2020, the Austin Independent School District (Austin ISD) began screening students and staff for COVID-19, keying in on individuals with recent travel to China or presenting with a fever. The Austin-Travis County EMS also began monitoring individuals with a susceptible travel history. APH activated its Department Operations Center in February 2020 and established a five-phase COVID-19 coordination and response strategy. Although cases would not be confirmed in Austin for another 11 days, interviews between Austin Public Health officials and 70 people later testing positive for the virus found that some individuals were symptomatic as early as March 2, 2020. These individuals may have been diagnosed with the flu or other upper respiratory tract infection and may have contributed to an undetected spread of COVID-19 in the Austin area. On March 3, 2020, APH announced that it was investigating at least one patient in Travis County for COVID-19. Some technology and social media companies, including Amazon Studios, Facebook, Mashable, TikTok, and Twitter, and musical artists like Ozzy Osbourne, Trent Reznor, and Atticus Ross, began withdrawing from the Austin music and media conference South by Southwest scheduled for March 2020 due to COVID-19 concerns. Pressure to cancel the event increased as additional participants pulled out of the conference; a Change.org petition calling for SXSW's cancellation amassed over 50,000 signatures. Conference organizers anticipated that SXSW would continue as planned with increased sanitation stations; Mark Escott of APH stated that there was "no evidence" that cancelling the event would "make the community safer."

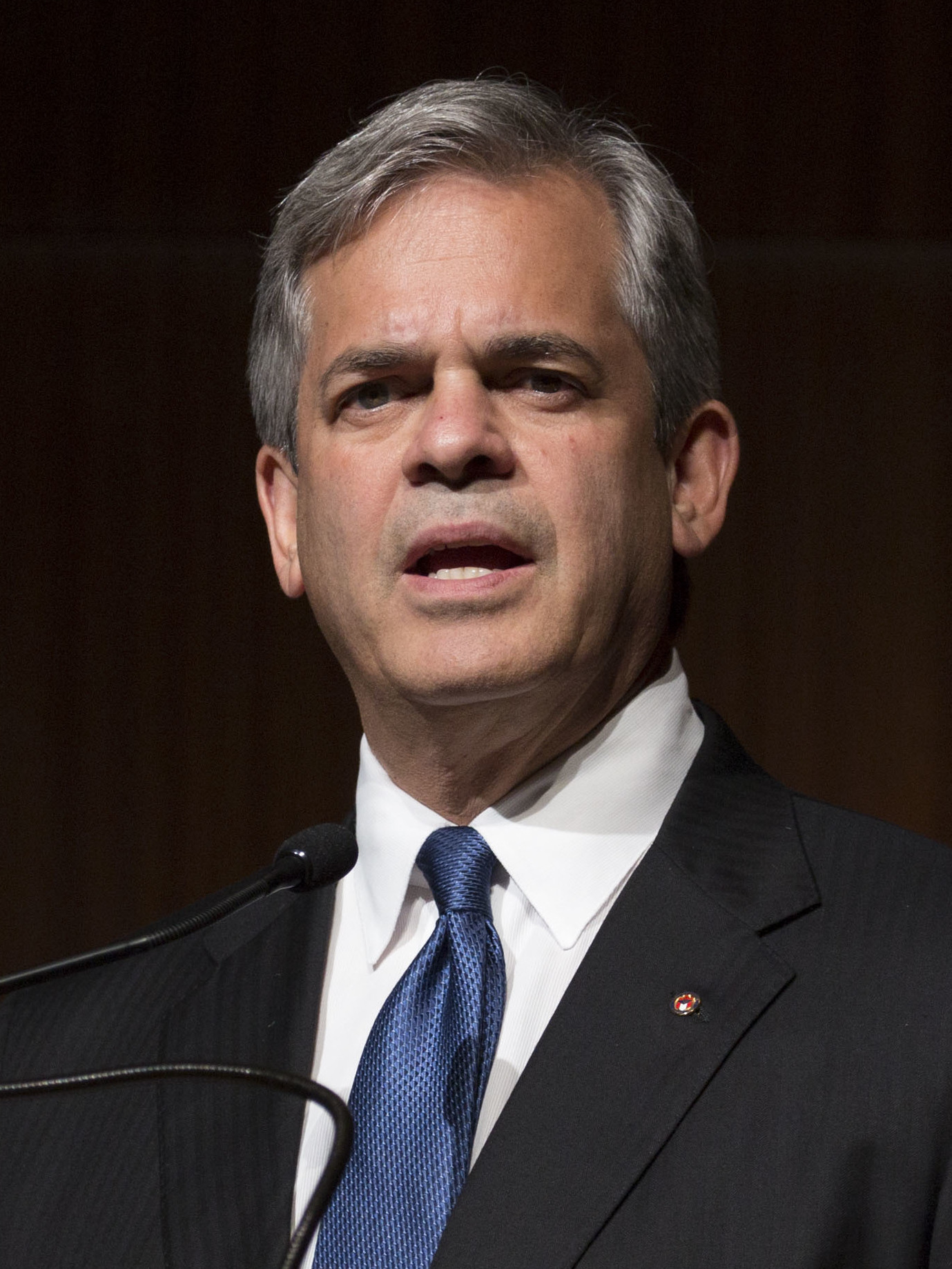
Steve Adler, the Mayor of Austin, declared a state of disaster on March 6, 2020

On March 6, 2020, Austin Mayor Steve Adler and Travis County Judge Sarah Eckhardt declared a local state of disaster for the city, activating the city's Emergency Operations Plan. Adler also proscribed SXSW from proceeding, marking the first cancellation of the event in its 34-year history. Other events expecting more than 2,500 participants were also prohibited unless organizers could demonstrate the efficacy of their disease mitigation plans. The disaster declaration was made in anticipation of the city's "Spring Festival" season, a period in which the city hosts several events including SXSW; significant visitors were still expected from outside the city during the season despite the declaration. Austin ISD canceled its international school trips on March 7, 2020. Additional events around the city were cancelled or postponed in subsequent weeks. Escott issued a control order on March 11, 2020, directing long-term care facilities to take precautionary actions including checking the temperature of anyone entering the facility and mandatory reporting of any febrile illnesses to APH. The Austin City Council voted unanimously on March 12, 2020, to extend the local disaster declaration indefinitely.

==== First confirmed cases and stay-at-home order ====
The first presumptive positive cases of COVID-19 in Austin/Travis County were reported by APH on March 13, 2020. Two of the patients lived outside of Travis County while the third was Carmel Fenves, the wife of University of Texas President Greg Fenves. The University of Texas at Austin, St. Edward's University, Austin Community College, and Austin ISD all canceled classes on March 13 in response to the developments. Community gatherings—defined as public or private and indoor or outdoor events expecting at least 250 people simultaneously in a confined or enclosed space—were banned in an order adopted by Adler and Eckhardt on March 14, 2020, and effective between March 15–May 1. Violations of the order were considered misdemeanors subject to fines of up to $1,000 or 180 days in jail. Austin's first drive-through COVID-19 testing center was opened on March 14. Escott issued a control order that day mandating screening and isolation procedures for all healthcare facilities, echoing the similar order for long-term care facilities issued earlier in the week. To reduce the risk of the disease at the Travis County Jail, county judges increased the approval of bonds for inmates. Adler and Eckhardt issued an order on March 17, 2020, ordering the closure of bars and common dining areas at restaurants until May 1. Community gatherings of 10 or more people in a confined space were also prohibited outside of spaces designated as critical facilities. Operating procedures within the Austin Police Department and Austin Fire Department were also changed to mitigate the spread of the disease.

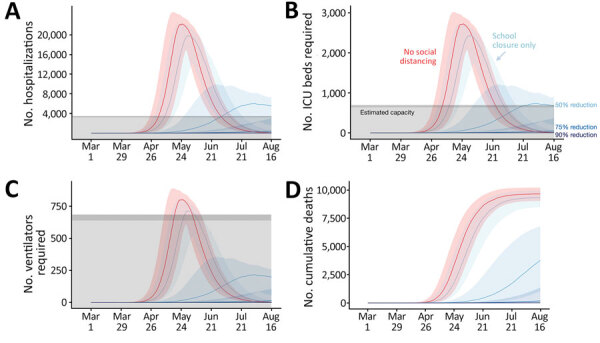
(Counterclockwise from top-left) Projected hospitalizations, ICU bed requirements, cumulative deaths, and ventilator requirements from the model used as the basis for the stay-at-home order issued on March 24, 2020

On March 19, 2020, APH reported evidence of community spread of COVID-19. Austin adopted the Texas Governor Greg Abbott's social gathering restrictions and social distancing requirements on March 20, 2020, with Adler affirming in an order that "staying home is safest." With hospitals facing increasing pressure from increasing pandemic-related hospitalizations and risk of viral exposure, more than 250 doctors petitioned Austin and Travis County officials to procure additional protective equipment, increase testing, and implement a mandatory lockdown. Hospitals in the Austin area barred most visitors. St. David's HealthCare began to postpone elective surgeries on March 23. A stay-at-home order was issued on March 24, 2020, directing the closure of non-essential state businesses and prohibiting gatherings of any size outside of a single household through April 13, 2020. Non-essential travel was also prohibited. Violations of the order also carried the same penalties as the earlier March 14 order. At a press conference announcing the order, Escott also called upon area schools to remain closed for the remainder of their terms.

The cumulative number of COVID-19 cases in Austin and Travis County as reported by APH exceeded 100 by March 25, 2020. Most cases at the time involved people younger than 40 years old. A 60-day moratorium on evictions was passed by the Austin City Council on March 26, 2020, along with other loans and assistance programs. The first death in Travis County was reported on March 27, 2020, involving a 70-year-old woman "with significant underlying health conditions" according to the APH. The Austin Parks and Recreation Department closed all park amenities on March 28, 2020, aside from water fountains and restrooms. On March 31, 2020, APH reported that 28 students of the University of Texas at Austin tested positive for SARS-CoV-2 after returning from a spring break trip to Cabo San Lucas. A further investigation of 231 people who either took part in the trip or came into contact with those who did was conducted by the University of Texas Health Austin's COVID-19 Center, resulting in 64 patients with positive test results, of which a fifth were asymptomatic; none were hospitalized. Many of the patients lived in West Campus, which Adler characterized as a COVID-19 hot spot. By April 7, 2020, APH was monitoring eight COVID-19 clusters—groups of closely related cases including the one associated with the Cabo San Lucas trip—amid a majority of individual cases. Most of the clusters involved senior living communities. The city leased a Crowne Plaza in early April for use as an isolation facility for people unable to quarantine at home, and later leased a second hotel for the same purpose in mid-April. Eckhardt reported that physical contacts had declined by roughly 64 percent in early April in the wake of the stay-at-home order. A $15 million emergency relief fund was passed by Austin City Council on April 10, 2020, with families being the intended direct recipients. Three days later, the stay-at-home order was extended to May 8, 2020. Facial coverings were also mandated for anyone in public over the age of 10. The cumulative number of COVID-19 cases in Austin and Travis County as reported by APH exceeded 1,000 by April 16, 2020.

=== Phased reopening (May–June 2020) ===
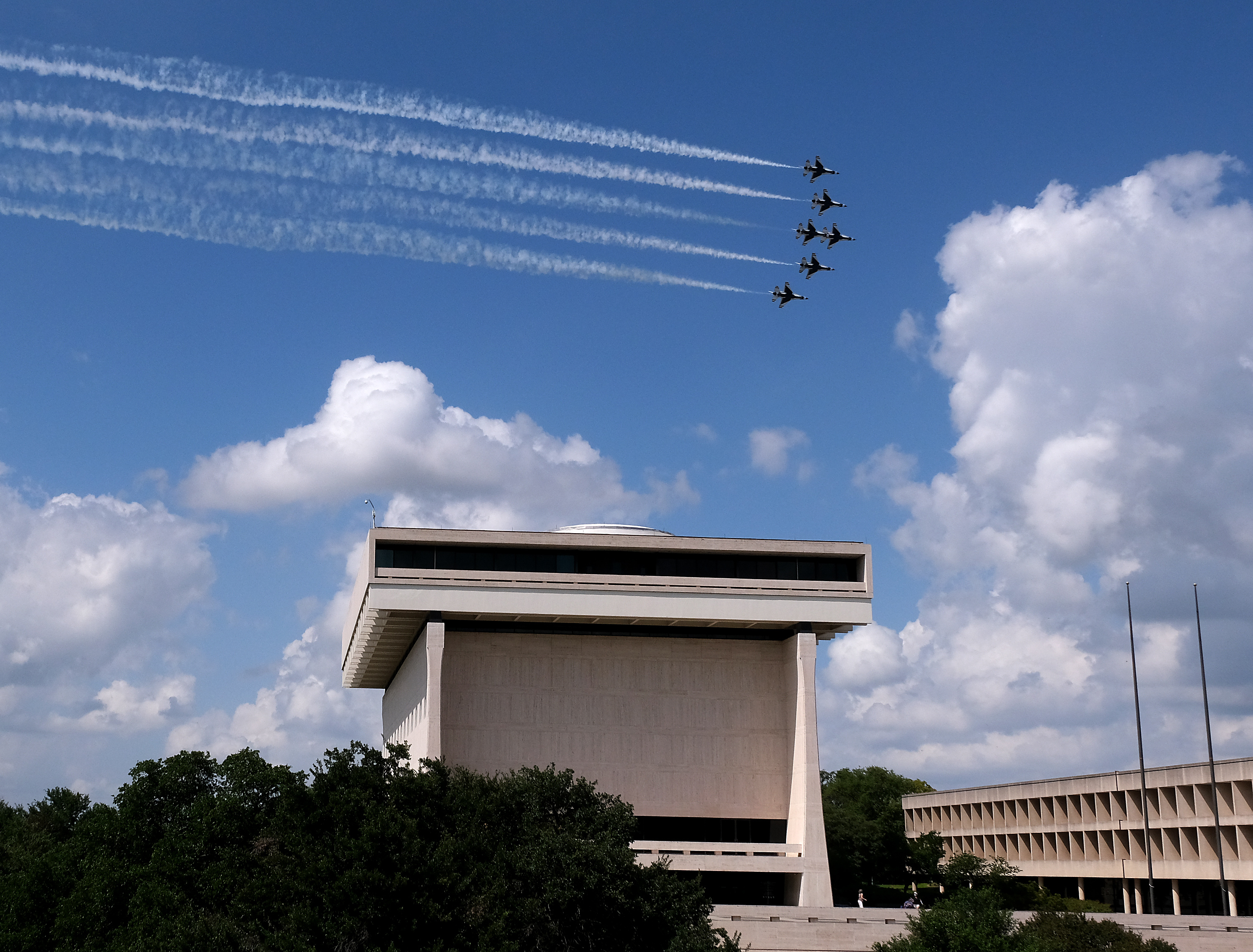
United States Air Force Thunderbirds flying over Austin on May 13, 2020, in honor of frontline and essential workers

In April 2020, Governor Abbott announced the planned expiration of statewide COVID-19 stay-at-home orders, to be followed by a reopening of Texas businesses in a series of three stages of relaxed restrictions. Phase 1 of the reopening plan went into effect on May 1, 2020, followed by Phase 2 on May 18, 2020, and Phase 3 on June 3, 2020. The statewide loosening of restrictions was intended to supersede any contravening local policies. Although Mayor Adler and County Judge Eckhardt criticized the reopening's commencement as occurring too quickly, the local "Stay Home, Work Safe" order for Austin was modified to accommodate the Phase 1 relaxations on May 1, 2020. The modified order was later extended to the end of May in conjunction with mandatory social distancing. Some churches and restaurants began to reopen in Austin promptly once the statewide reopening plan came into effect. Though the number of new COVID-19 cases and COVID-19 hospitalizations in the Austin area stabilized in the weeks leading up to the reopening, APH indicated that they were anticipating a possible surge in the disease's prevalence following the reopening.

On May 19, 2020, APH reported that it was monitoring 36 clusters of COVID-19 in Travis County workers, of which 19 were associated with the construction industry. Other clusters were identified in building cleanup and maintenance workers and health workers, among other industries. Ten days later, the stay-at-home order was extended through June 15; an analysis from Drexel University estimated that the first 45 days of the order mitigated 4,988 fatalities and 45,898 hospitalizations. At the end of May 2020, the number of active COVID-19 hospitalizations in the Austin metropolitan area reached 79, marking the lowest number since April 28, 2020. However, the number of COVID-19 cases increased, with the 425 cases reported by APH in the final week of May 2020 being the most of any week up until that point. Some city pools including Barton Springs Pool reopened in early June 2020, concurrent with the third phase of relaxed establishment restrictions statewide.

=== Second COVID-19 wave (June–August 2020) ===
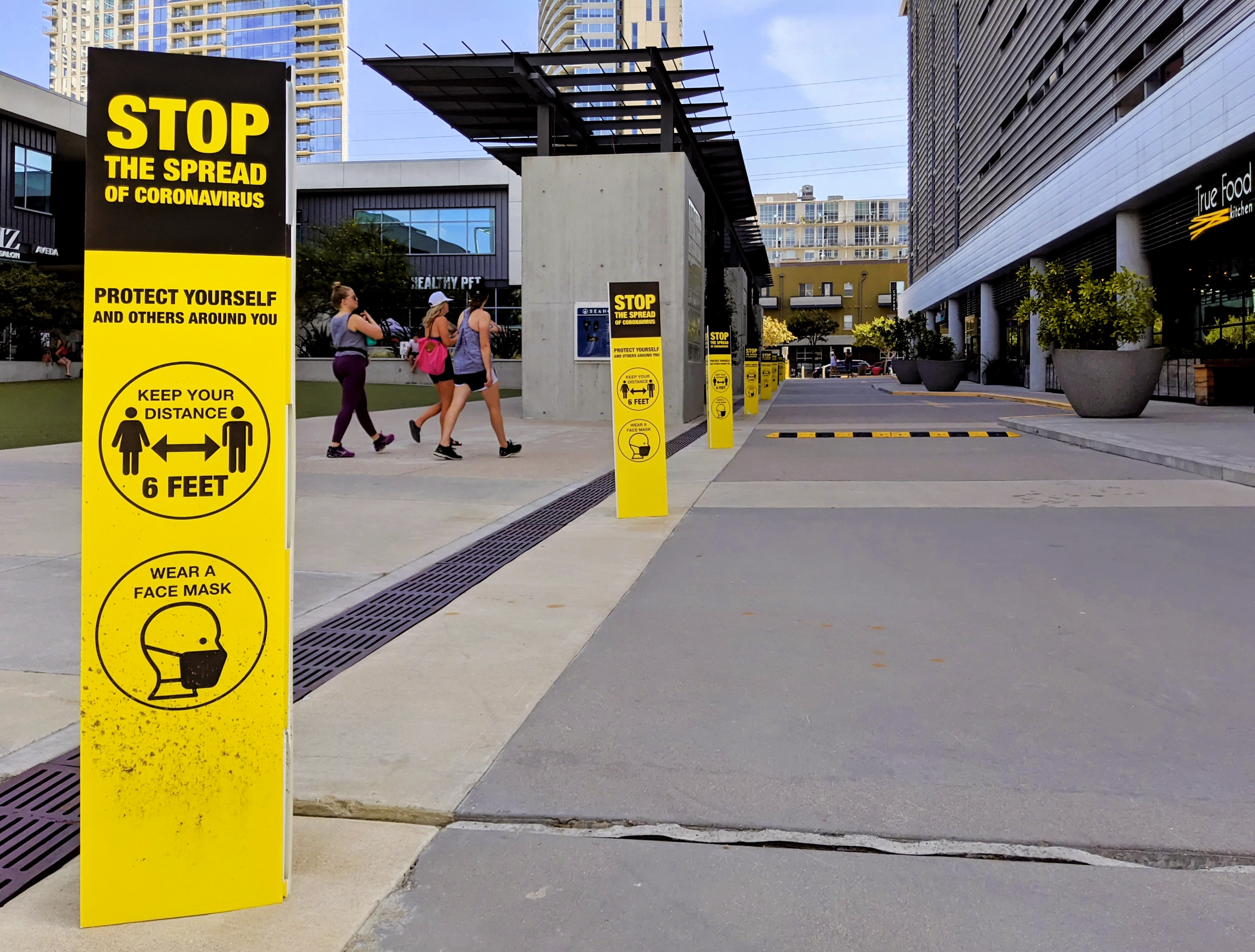
Public awareness signs in Downtown Austin in July 2020

In June 2020, the incidence of COVID-19 cases in the Austin area increased sharply in what some local media outlets and health officials termed a "second wave" of the disease. Daily case counts began to set record highs for the city, with daily counts exceeding 100 for the first time on June 8, 2020. Dr. Escott of APH attributed the surge to a combination of the reopening of businesses and "an increase in risk-taking behavior" related to social distancing and personal hygiene, with Memorial Day events being a possible catalyst. Local protests in response to the murder of George Floyd were also a possible contributor. By June 11, 2020, over a hundred deaths in Austin were linked to COVID-19. On June 14, 2020, Austin moved into stage 4 of APH's risk-based guidelines with seven-day averaged daily hospitalizations exceeding 20. In response, the active stay-at-home order was extended to August 15, 2020, accompanied by the recommendations associated with the stage 4 status. Some parts of the order remained unenforceable due to state law. On June 17, 2020, Mayor Adler issued an order requiring that all Austin businesses mandate masks for their workers and customers in most circumstances.

An analysis from Evercore using data from Johns Hopkins University on June 18, 2020, determined that the Greater Austin metropolitan area was experiencing the fifth-fastest increase in COVID-19 cases among U.S. metropolitan areas, with a doubling time of approximately 16 days. On the same day, Adler issued an order requiring businesses to mandate face coverings for employees and visitors. Between June 19–21, the city reported three consecutive record-high COVID-19 case confirmations, with 506 on the third day. This uptick in cases was also reflected statewide, leading Governor Abbott to pause the state's reopening plan on June 25, 2020. The White House Coronavirus Task Force on June 30, 2020, presented a graphic showing the Austin metropolitan area as having the highest seven-day average rate of positive COVID-19 tests in the country. At the time, the positivity rate was roughly 22 percent.

The cumulative number of COVID-19 cases in Austin and Travis County as reported by APH exceeded 10,000 by July 1, 2020. APH modelling showed that area hospital capacity would be exceeded by mid-July if the spread of COVID-19 was not curtailed. Various festivities planned for Independence Day were canceled, including the Auditorium Shores fireworks show and Austin Symphony concert. All Travis County parks were also closed for Independence Day and on surrounding days. On July 8, 2020, APH reported 753 new cases of COVID-19 in the Austin area, marking the highest single-day case total in 2020. The 7-day moving average of COVID-19 hospitalizations also reached a peak of 75.1 on July 8. The severity of the pandemic at the time led city officials to draft plans for a possible 35-day shutdown of the city with indicators nearing stage 5: the most severe tier on the APH's policy recommendation scale. A subsequent decline in hospitalizations led APH to maintain its stage-4 guidelines, opting not to recommend a city shutdown. On July 14, 2020, in his capacity as the interim Austin–Travis County Health Authority, Escott issued an order outlining individual behavior rules and instituting restrictions on schools. The rules included circumstances for mandatory mask wearing, social distancing rules, and limitations on school functions. These emergency rules were set to expire on November 12, 2020.

=== Schools reopen (August–October 2020) ===
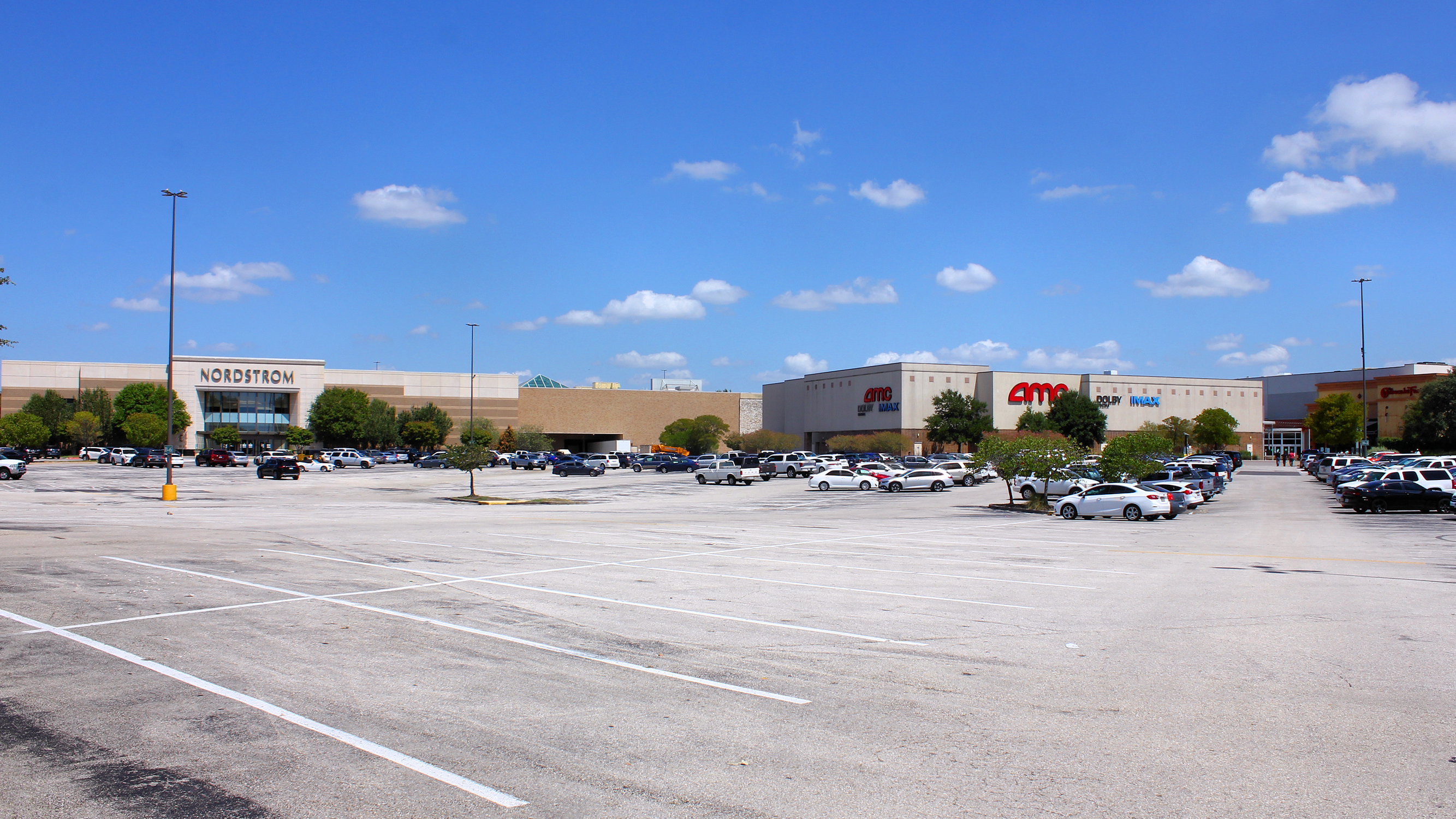
Barton Creek Square Mall in September 2020

Following the rapid increase in COVID-19 cases towards the end of June 2020 and beginning of July 2020, case counts began to plateau at approximately 500 new cases per day before declining towards the end of July 2020. The numbers of new cases and hospitalizations declined steadily, with Escott reporting a 12 consecutive days of improving COVID-19 metrics as the city's SARS-CoV-2 positivity rate fell below 10 percent by July 28, 2020. The number of active cases in Travis County was also at one point less than the less populated and neighboring Hays County. The decline in cases slowed entering August 2020 and was followed by a slight upward trend in cases, including an increase in cases and hospitalizations among people aged 10–19 years old. The number of hospitalizations overall held steady early in the month. On August 5, 2020, the Travis County Commissioners Court approved the expansion of the Health Authority's emergency rules to unincorporated areas with violations subject to fines of up to $500. On August 14, 2020, the City of Austin extended its face covering, social distancing, and gathering restrictions—now collectively part of the Stay Home, Mask and Otherwise Be Safe Order—through December 15, 2020. New guidelines were also released for schools anticipating classes in the autumn of 2020.

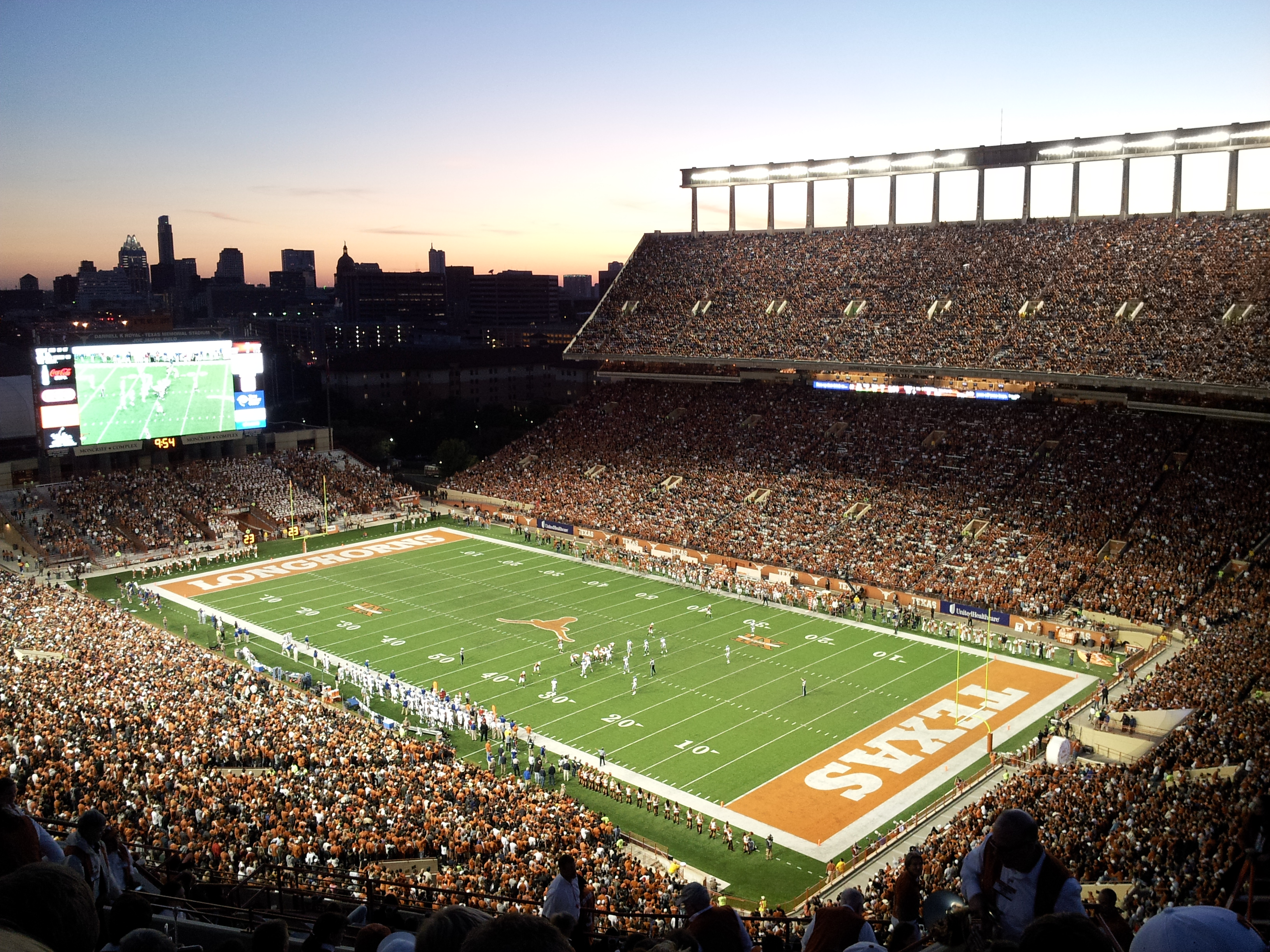
Attendance was limited to 25 percent capacity for games played at Darrell K Royal–Texas Memorial Stadium (2011 photo).

A sustained lowering of positivity rates and COVID-19 cases in August 2020 led APH to lower their risk-based guidelines to stage 3 for the first time since June 2020, allowing for a relaxation of restrictions. The University of Texas at Austin started its fall 2020 term on August 26, 2020, with some classes offering in-person instruction for the first time since March 30, 2020. Austin ISD schools began classes on September 8, 2020, under entirely remote instruction until October 6, 2020. Schools began to report new cases of COVID-19 following the start of classes, though overall tallies remained lower than the spike in June and July 2020. Seven-day moving average COVID-19 hospitalizations in mid-September 2020 fell to their lowest values since early June 2020. Daily case counts fluctuated in September 2020, though anomalous increases of COVID-19 prevalence among people aged 10–29 years old led to an 83 percent increase in cases overall in mid-September. The college-aged cohort had a positivity rate of 10 percent while the high-school-aged cohort had a positivity rate of 14 percent, respectively more than double and triple the community positivity rate for COVID-19; Escott, the APH Interim Health Authority, stated that these increases were driven by social gatherings and extracurricular activities rather than classroom instruction. On October 5, 2020, Austin ISD began allowing in-person instruction at it schools up to 25 percent capacity, making the school district one of the last to do so in the region.

In early October 2020, COVID-19 hospitalizations in the Austin area were at their lowest since April 2020. Modelling from the University of Texas at one point projected that COVID-19 indicators would drop to stage 2 levels on the APH's scale. According to Escott, October 4, 2020, marked a low point in the number of new COVID-19 cases following the surge during the preceding summer. However, hospitalizations began to increase by mid-October 2020, and on October 21 were at their highest levels since late August 2020. Escott reported that there was a 96 percent chance that the spread of the disease was increasing in the county and that further increases and a return to stage 4 restrictions was possible in the ensuing weeks.

=== Holiday season resurgence (November 2020–January 2021) ===
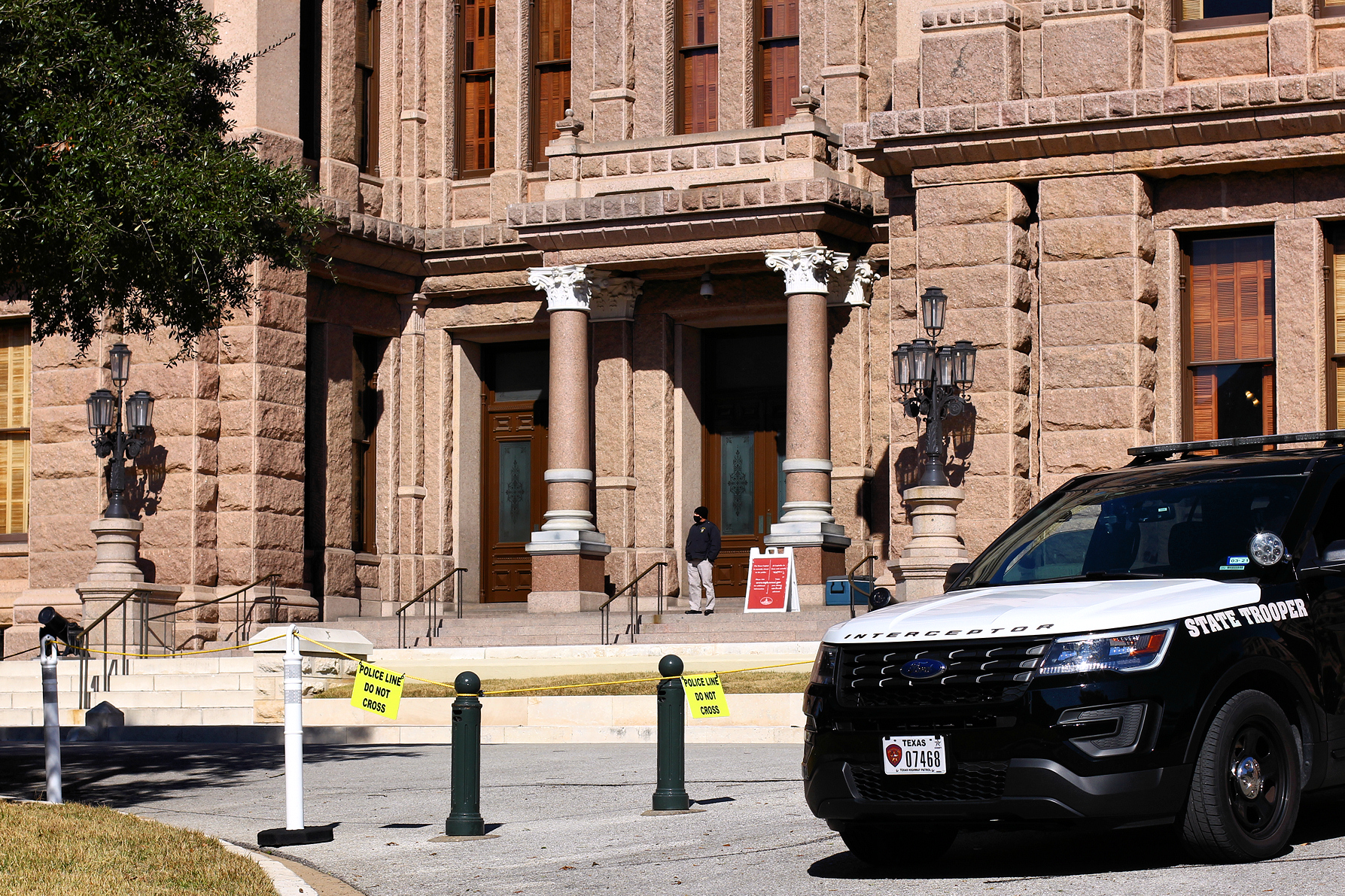
The closed Texas State Capitol in December 2020

Following rises in ventilator and intensive care unit usage as well as hospitalizations overall in October 2020, modelling from the University of Texas of Austin indicated a possible increase in the prevalence of COVID-19 towards Thanksgiving. One projection gave a 96 percent likelihood of an increase in cases, with the caseload increasing by 257 percent. APH officials warned that this possible surge in cases could be larger than the June–July 2020 surge. A decline in hospital admissions in late October tempered these initial forecasts, but still pointed towards a worsening of the pandemic in the coming months continuing past Christmas. By October 30, 2020, Austin's municipal government had spent $449.9 million in its response to the pandemic. At the start of November 2020, APH stated that key indicators regarding COVID-19 had either stabilized or improved from the preceding week. However, cases increased again thereafter, and on November 5, 2020, APH reported that the number of active cases of the virus was at its highest since August 15, 2020, with more than half of cases involving adults between the ages of 20–39. APH Interim Health Authority Escott said he believed that the increase was due to a rise in risky behaviors following pandemic fatigue; Escott would later extend the emergency behavior rules through the end of 2020.

By November 9, 2020, the number of new cases in Austin had doubled relative to early October 2020. Hospitalizations also reached levels unseen since August 2020, and indicators broadly became reminiscent of the summer 2020 wave. Escott recommended that the city move into stage-4 restrictions as the number of new COVID-19 cases continued to double; the city formally moved into stage 4 two days later. City officials encouraged residents not to congregate with people beyond their households for Thanksgiving, and to avoid shopping in-person for Black Friday. Mayor Adler was criticized for hosting a wedding reception in Downtown Austin and vacationing in Cabo San Lucas despite urging people to stay home. An anticipated rise in cases following Thanksgiving began to materialize in mid-December 2020 during a period that APH called a "stage of widespread community exposure". The Stay Home, Mask and Otherwise Be Safe order was extended through February 16, 2021, as the pandemic worsened. The emergency Health Authority rules were also extended through April 15, 2021. On December 23, 2020, the city formally moved into stage 5 of the APH's coronavirus guidelines, marking the first time that the city reached the most severe category. Though no new regulations were implemented, an order was issued outlining strong behavioral recommendations in conjunction with the stage-5 guidelines.

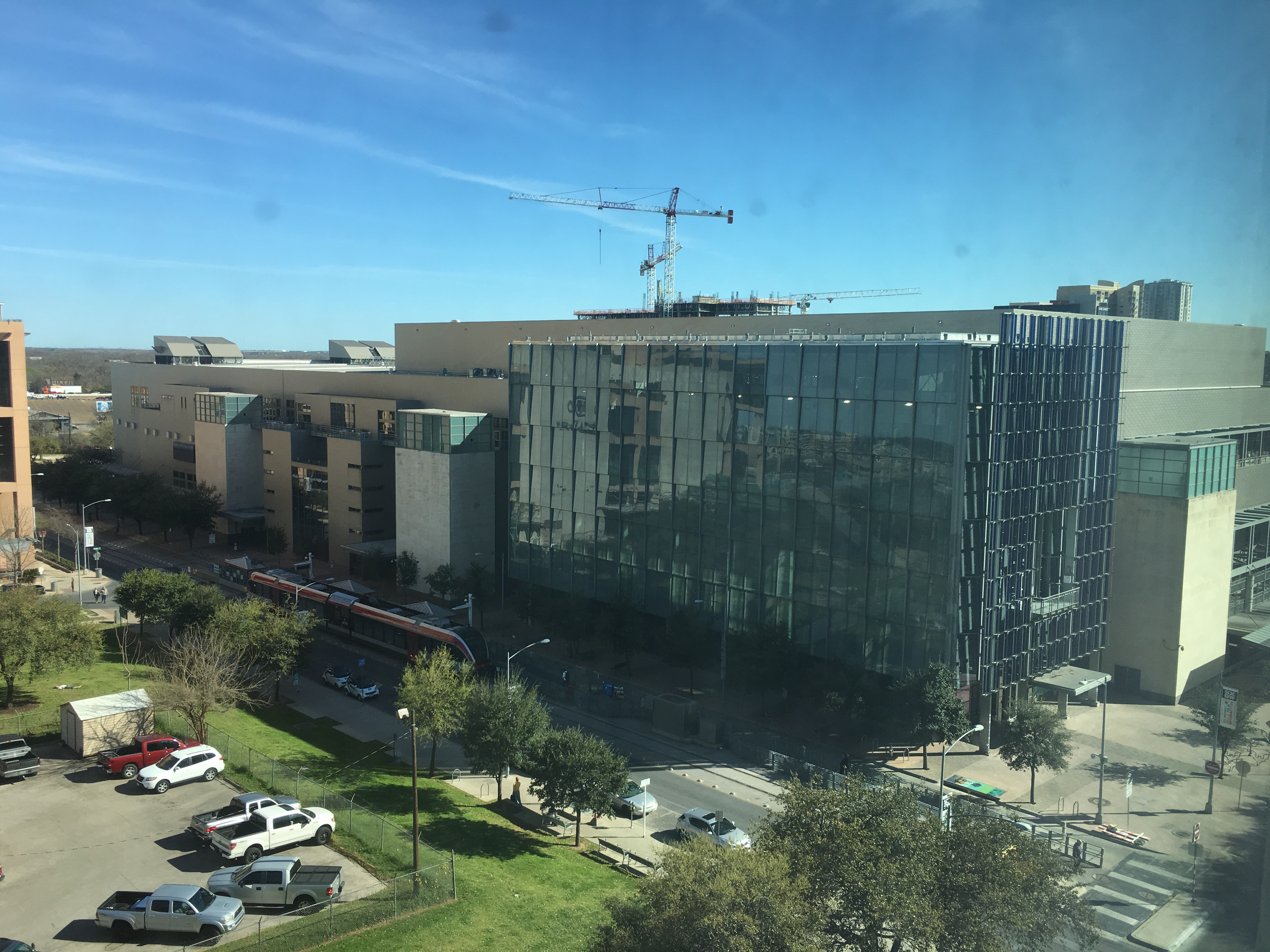
The Austin Convention Center was used as a field hospital beginning in January 2021

The City of Austin issued a halt on dine-in service at restaurants and bars between 10:30 p.m. on December 31, 2020, and 6:00 a.m. January 1, 2021, including part of New Year's Eve and New Year's Day. Violations of the order were subject to a $1,000 fine. Governor Abbott asserted on Twitter that the local directive was not allowed under his statewide orders. Mayor Adler responded by stating that the order was an operational restraint that did not violate Abbott's orders. Texas Attorney General Ken Paxton filed suit against the City of Austin and Travis County on December 30, 2020, over the legality of the local ordinance. The Texas Supreme Court enjoined enforcement of the ordinance, granting Paxton's petition for writ of mandamus and preventing Austin from carrying out the restrictions.

An infusion center was opened in Austin in early January 2021 to treat symptomatic COVID-19 patients. By January 4, 2021, the seven-day moving average of COVID-19 hospitalizations—76.6 patients—was at its highest since the beginning of the pandemic. Three days later, APH reported 879 new cases of COVID-19, setting a daily record and surpassing any daily report from the summer of 2020. On January 10, 2021, the seven-day average proportion of hospitalizations in the region attributable to COVID-19 exceeded 15 percent, automatically triggering a restriction of businesses and retail capacities to 50 percent. In response to area hospitals nearing capacity, the Austin Convention Center opened as a field hospital with 25 beds on January 12, 2021. Escott stated the next day that he believed the increased caseload and positivity rates was due to the spread of a new contagious variant of COVID-19 in the Austin area. In mid-January 2021, COVID-19 positivity rates at Austin schools exceeded WHO recommendations, with middle schools reporting a 27.1 percent positivity rate and high schools reporting a 20.2 percent positivity rate.

==== First vaccines administered ====
Vaccinations for COVID-19 in Austin followed the phased approach established by the Texas Department of State Health Services (DSHS), which began with vaccine administration to care providers as part of phase 1A and the elderly and those with chronic medical conditions as part of phase 1B. APH announced on December 4, 2020, that it would receive 13,650 initial doses of the Pfizer–BioNTech COVID-19 vaccine as part of a first wave of inoculations. Dell Medical School received 2,925 doses of the Pfizer–BioNTech COVID-19 vaccine on December 14, 2020, marking the first shipment of COVID-19 vaccines to Austin. Healthcare workers at the University of Texas directly working with patients were prioritized to receive the vaccines first; the first vaccines were administered on December 15, 2020. Vulnerable Austin ISD staff began receiving vaccine doses on January 2, 2021. APH opened a pre-registration system for COVID-19 vaccines on January 13, 2021, which was met with high demand.

== Effects ==
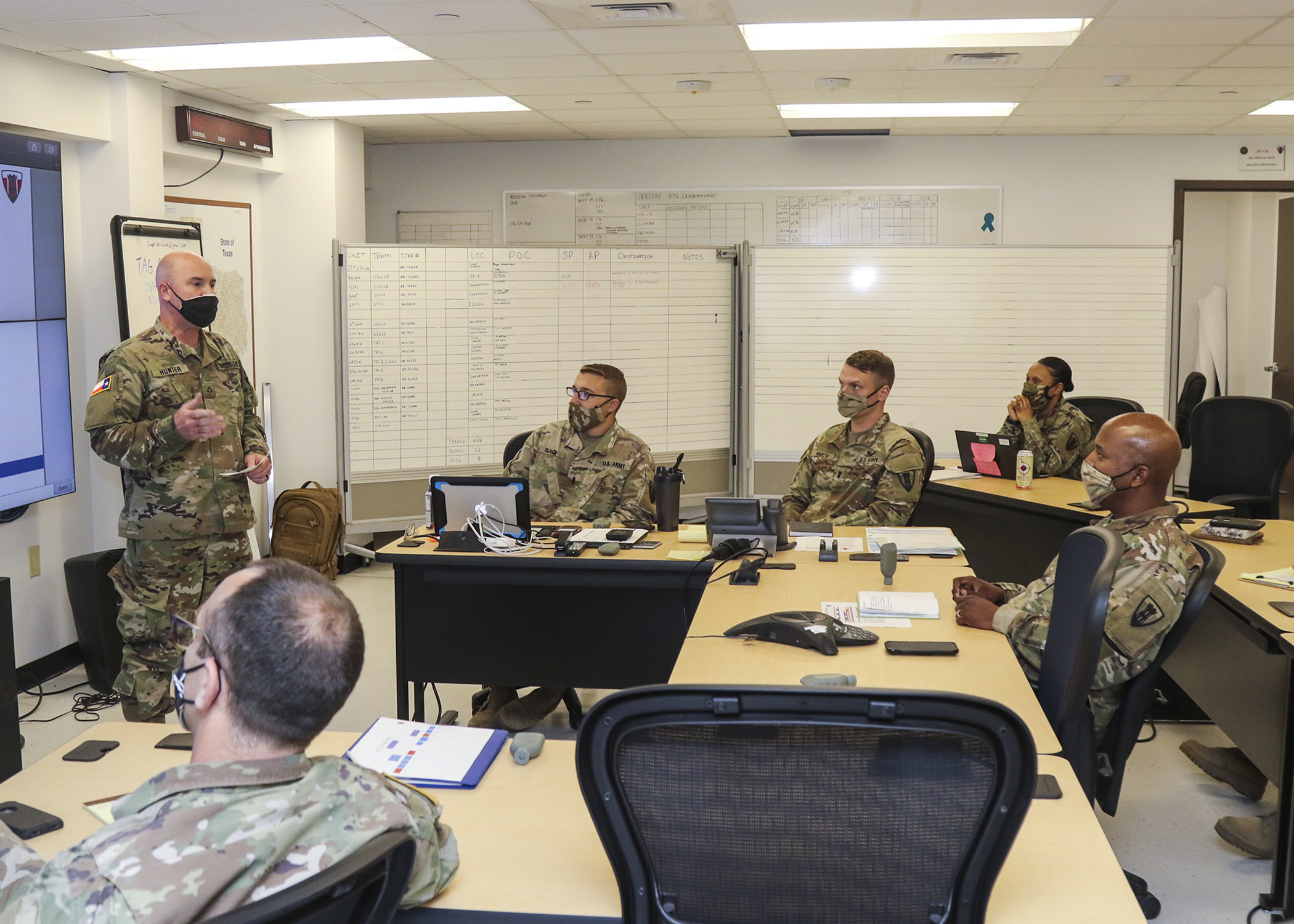
The Texas State Guard at Camp Mabry were deployed to support COVID-19 relief efforts

In April 2020, 138,000 Austin residents were without a job, reflecting a 12.2 percent unemployment rate; this was the highest unemployment rate recorded in the city since recordkeeping began in 1990; the previous highest was 7.8 percent in July 2009. Nearly half of the job losses between March and April 2020 were from bars, restaurants, and hotels. Recovery of the hospitality sector was expected to be slow due to the cancellation of high-profile tourist-attracting events. Tom Noonan, the president and CEO of Visit Austin, estimated that the impact of the COVID-19 pandemic on tourism in the spring of 2020 was nine times worse than the September 11 attacks. Austin-Bergstrom International Airport saw a 96.6 percent decrease in passenger departures in April 2020 relative to April 2019, with the same metric down 36 percent over the first four months of 2020 compared to the first four months of 2019. Hotel occupancy in Austin bottomed out at roughly 20 percent in mid-April 2020 before recovering to 45 percent by June 2020. Austin-area real estate saw a 21.6 percent decline in the sale of condominiums, single-family homes, and townhouses in April 2020 across five central Texas counties including Travis County, accompanied by declines in pending sales and active real estate listings. Austin's industry sector, including retail stores, lost 14,000 jobs between March and April 2020, while the education and health services sector lost 19,300 jobs in the same period. Austin's creative sector was among the hardest-hit in the U.S. A study from the Brookings Institution in August 2020 estimated that creative industries in Austin lost 28,852 jobs (32.6 percent of creative jobs) and $1.26 million (9.2 percent of creative sales) in sales between April and July 2020.

Although restaurants were considered essential businesses, safety regulations prompted by the pandemic nonetheless disrupted their operation, implementing capacity limitations and changes to service protocols. Indoor dining was either prohibited or heavily restricted during the pandemic, forcing transitions to take-out dining; the first closures of restaurants and bars began on March 17, 2020, following restaurant shutdowns imposed by the City of Austin. This initial mandated closure of restaurant dining rooms and bars lasted until May 1, 2020. The pandemic led to permanent closures of Austin businesses, including some longstanding establishments. In July 2020, a Yelp data showed the temporary or permanent closure of 1,449 businesses in the Austin metropolitan area, ranking the region 14th in the U.S. in terms of business closures. Of these, 155 restaurants and 72 retail vendors closed permanently between March 1 and July 10. By September 30, 2020, the City of Austin received nearly 7,000 complaints of COVID-19 safety violations at businesses and had issued citations to at least 8 businesses. Some bars in Austin had their operating licenses suspended after the Texas Alcoholic Beverage Commission began enforcing COVID-19 safety rules in June 2020. Health and fitness venues including gyms, pools, and rock climbing centers were also closed during the pandemic.

Risk of viral spread led to pedagogical changes at Austin schools, including both changes to instruction modes and academic calendars. On March 13, 2020, Austin Community College, Concordia University, St. Edward's University, and the University of Texas canceled classes and operations for the day; each institution was set to begin spring break the following week. Austin ISD also canceled its classes and closed its offices for the day. The University of Texas extended its spring break in 2020 by one week through March 27. Classes there began transitioning to online teaching on March 30, 2020, and all classes were maintained online through the school's summer semester. Concordia University, Huston–Tillotson University, and St. Edward's University also moved classes online for the rest of the semester, and many closed their on-campus residences and eased their grading policies. Austin ISD's schools closed indefinitely in spring 2020 as instruction moved entirely online. For the fall 2020 semester, Austin ISD continued online instruction but began opening its schools and offering limited in-person instruction in October. Austin-area colleges and universities offered a mix of both online and in-person instruction for the fall.

With more people saying at home during the pandemic, utility bills increased in tandem with a rise in residential electricity usage throughout Austin. Industrial and commercial energy usage was expected to decrease. The Austin City Council approved $46 million in emergency relief for electric and water bills in April 2020 through October 2020. Austin's homeless population increased by 11 percent according to a May 2020 city report, but without a clear causal link to the pandemic. However, business closures associated with the pandemic in Downtown Austin may have led to a broad movement of the homeless population away from he downtown area. A decrease in arrests occurred concurrent with a combination of stay-at-home orders and event cancellations, with a 14 percent decrease in March 2020 compared to the preceding March; traffic warrant arrests decreased by 75 percent between the two months. However, domestic violence arrests increased in the same period.

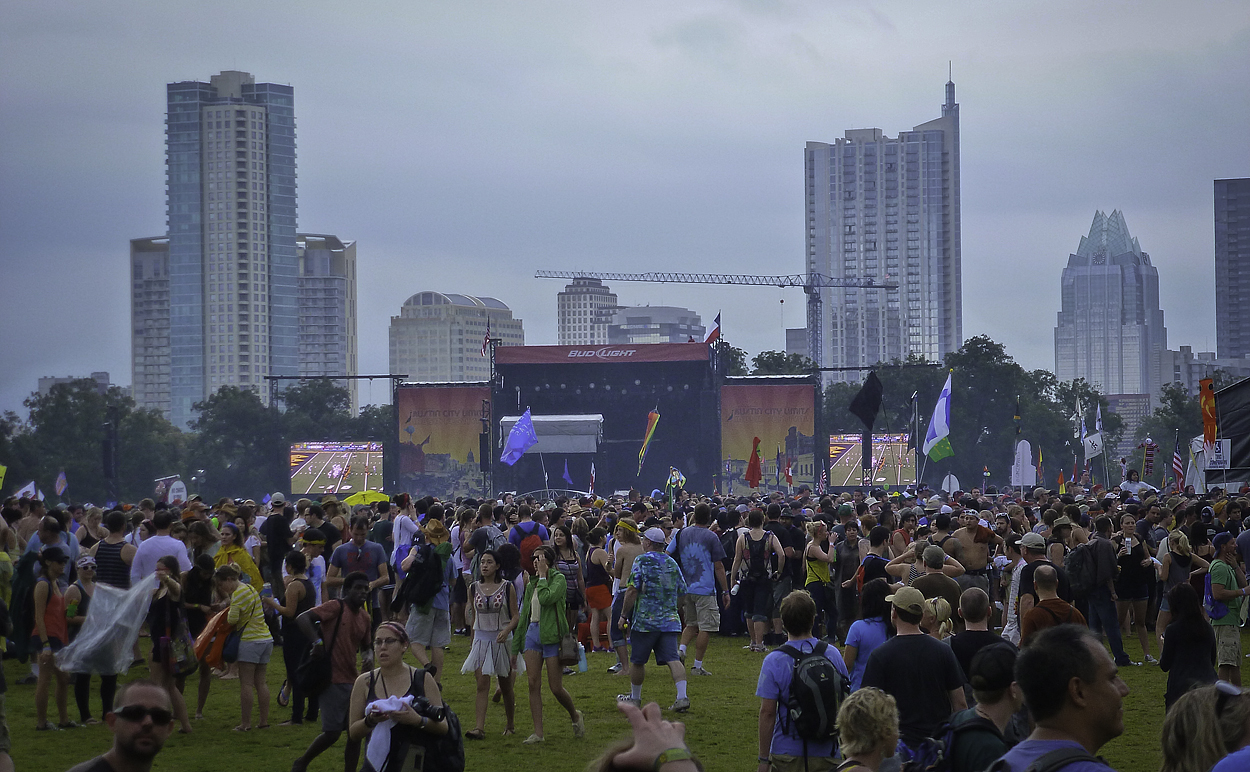
Austin City Limits and South by Southwest, with a combined economic impact in 2019 of over $600 million to the Austin area, were canceled in 2020 due to COVID-19 concerns.

The COVID-19 pandemic led to the cancellations of local Austin events. Numerous food-related events were canceled or postponed amid the pandemic, including Rodeo Austin and the Austin Food & Wine Festival. The 34th edition of South by Southwest (SXSW) was canceled by the City of Austin on March 6, 2020. Its cancellation was described by the New York Times as "the largest collateral damage of the virus so far on the international cultural calendar", and a significant economic blow to the City of Austin and local businesses was anticipated in its aftermath. Some small businesses reported a 20–50 percent loss of revenue as a result of the event's cancellation. In 2019, SXSW's local economic impact was estimated at $355.9 million, with an additional contribution of $1.7 million in hotel occupancy tax revenue and $5 million in sales taxes. The festival's managing company, SXSW LLC, laid off roughly a third of its annual employees in the aftermath of the cancellation with its funding and the possibility of a 2021 edition of SXSW in jeopardy. The Stand With Austin charity fund was started by Mayor Steve Adler, County Judge Sarah Eckhardt, and State Senator Kirk Watson to provide patronage for businesses suffering from SXSW's cancellation. Businesses in the Red River Cultural District also began a fundraising drive, Banding Together, to support impacted artists, events, and venues.

On July 1, 2020, the planned Austin City Limits Music Festival (ACL Music Festival) was canceled by event organizers; in 2019, the event had an estimated economic impact of $291 million and supported 1,500 jobs. Like the cancellation of SXSW in March 2020, the cancellation of the ACL Music Festival was expected to be a major blow to Austin's arts, leisure, and tourism sectors. On July 24, 2020, the originally planned 2020 Formula 1 United States Grand Prix at the Circuit of the Americas was canceled. The 30th anniversary edition of the Austin Marathon—the 25th largest marathon by attendance in the U.S. and scheduled for February 14, 2021—was postponed to April 2020. The 3M Half Marathon was canceled outright.

=== Response to policy ===
An Austin-American Statesman poll of 213 Central Texas civic leaders in April 2020 found that 71 percent of respondents rated Mayor Adler's coronavirus response as either "good" or "very good", with 22 percent assessing it as "fair" and 7 percent assessing it as "poor".

A rally attended by at least 200 people was held on October 10, 2020, at the Texas Governor's Mansion to protest Governor Abbott's COVID-19 restrictions. Chairman of the Republican Party of Texas Allen West and Texas Agriculture Commissioner Sid Miller gave speeches at the event.
