= Emma Bengtsson =

Swedish chef

- Born: August 27, 1981 (age 44); Falkenberg, Halland County, Sweden
- Education: International Restaurant School, Stockholm
- Culinary career
- Cooking style: Nordic cuisine
- Rating: Michelin stars
- Current restaurants: Aquavit; Aquavit London

Emma Bengtsson is a Swedish chef who holds two Michelin stars at the New York City-based restaurant Aquavit. She is the first female Swedish chef to win two stars.

== Career ==
Emma Bengtsson was born on August 27, 1981, in Falkenberg, Halland County in western Sweden. She originally wanted to be a fighter pilot, and in preparation for a military career, would go to shooting ranges with her father. Bengtsson was inspired to cook by her grandmother, and went on to study at the International Restaurant School in Stockholm. She interned at Edsbacka Krog, the only restaurant at the time in Sweden to hold two Michelin stars. She discovered that she enjoyed working as a pastry chef, and after graduating she continued to work at Edsbacka Krog for four years. She then moved to restaurant Operakällaren within the Royal Swedish Opera once again as a pastry chef for the following five years.

Bengtsson was then recruited as a pastry chef by Aquavit restaurant in New York City under executive chef Marcus Jernmark. During her time there, Aquavit won a Michelin star under Jernmark, but when he left, Bengtsson was offered his position. This wasn't something Bengtsson had sought, as she had only intended to help out the kitchen while a new executive chef was recruited. Under Bengtsson, the restaurant gained a second star, making her the first Swedish woman to hold two Michelin stars, and only the second in the United States after Dominique Crenn. In 2016, under Bengtsson, Aquavit opened a second restaurant, in London. This one differed from the New York establishment as it was significantly larger and so the dishes are less complicated to allow the kitchen to cope with the number of diners.

She has discussed with Crenn the lack of other female chefs with multiple Michelin stars, and said that "we're fed up with it. It's cooking for god's sake. I can't figure it out. I think women in general don't pay as much attention in getting to the top". When chef Henrik Ritzén, who is working as head chef at Aquavit London under Bengtsson, suggested that men work harder in a kitchen to impress female chefs, she responded "Yeah but the women, they don’t give a shit. They just do their work, they don’t need to impress. It’s funny." She doesn't like a macho culture in her kitchens, and instead prefers to it be a quiet place where everyone treats each other like family, no one shouts and no one swears.
