= Yes, Chef =

Memoir by Marcus Samuelsson

- Author: Marcus Samuelsson, Veronica Chambers
- Language: English
- Genre: Memoir, food writing
- Publisher: Random House
- Publication date: 2012

Yes, Chef is chef Marcus Samuelsson's 2012 memoir written with journalist Veronica Chambers.

Published by Random House, Yes, Chef describes Samuelsson's early years in Ethiopia, adoption and childhood in Sweden and then culinary career, concluding with a chapter on his restaurant in Harlem, Red Rooster. In the Washington Post, Robin Shulman called the book as "a sensitive and compelling account of his rise and his extraordinary life...searching for his place in the world through food." Reviewing Yes, Chef for The New York Times, Dwight Garner wrote, "What lifts this book beyond being merely the plainly told story of an interesting life is Mr. Samuelsson’s filigreed yet often pointed observations about why so few black chefs have risen to the top of the culinary world."

Yes, Chef was a New York Times best-seller and won the 2013 James Beard Award for Writing and Literature.
