= Veronica Chambers =

Afro-Latina Writer and teacher

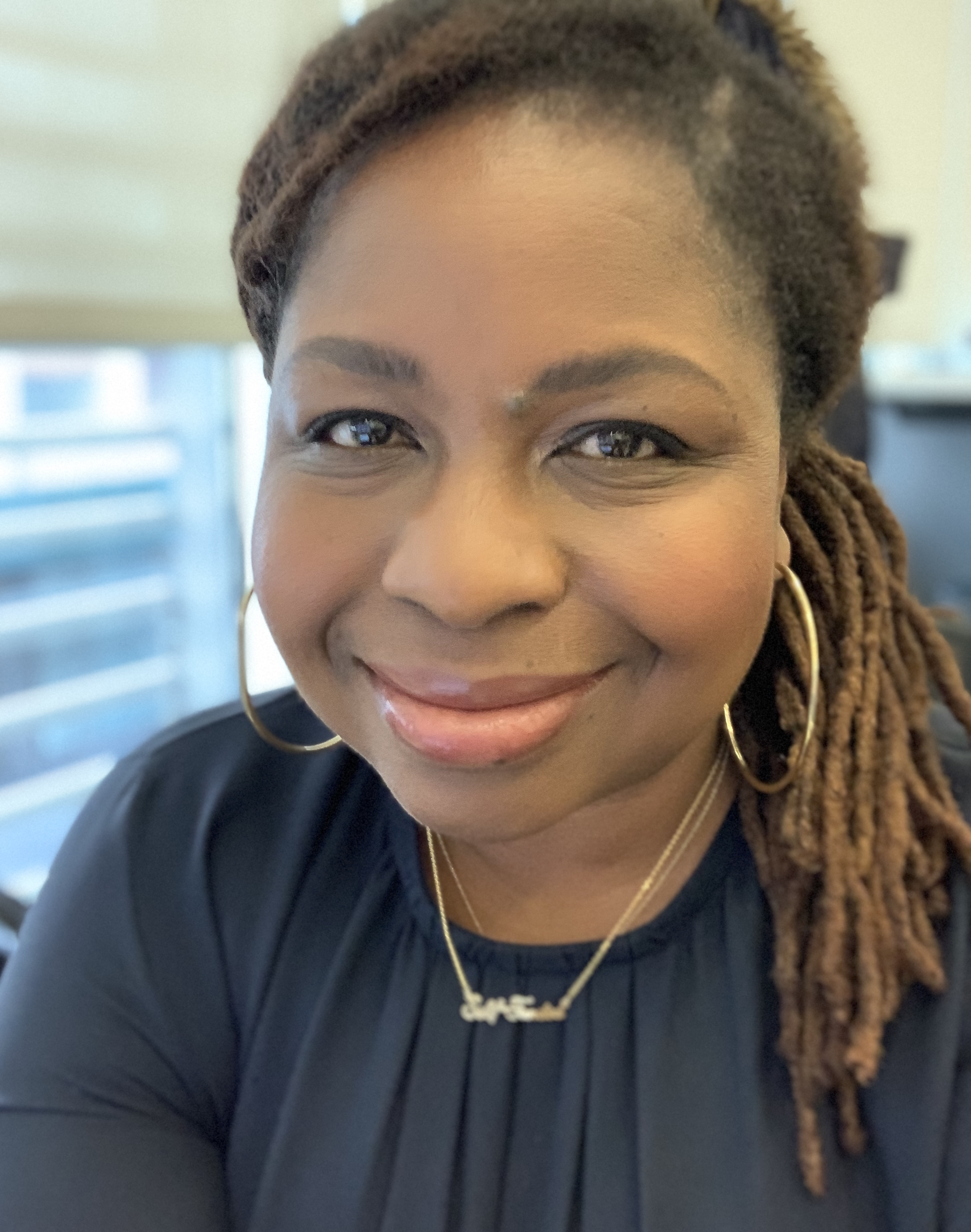
- Veronica Chambers in New York City
- Writing career
- Notable awards: 2013 James Beard Award for Writing and Literature

Veronica Chambers is an Afro-Latina author, teacher, and magazine executive. Chambers has been an editor and writer for New York Times Magazine, Newsweek, Glamour, Good Housekeeping, Premiere, Esquire, Parade and O, The Oprah Magazine.

== Early life ==
Chambers was born in Panama and raised in Brooklyn. Chambers attended Bard College at Simon's Rock, in Great Barrington, Massachusetts, where she received a B.A. in Literary Studies, summa cum laude.

== Career ==
Chambers taught writing at Stanford University, Bowdoin College, Bard College at Simon's Rock, and the Rutgers University Summer Program. She has been a fellow at Columbia University's Freedom Forum. the Japan Society Media Fellows Program in New York and Tokyo, and Stanford University's John S. Knight Journalism Fellowship.

In 2012, New York Times editor Dwight Garner wrote Yes, Chef was "one of the great culinary stories of our time". In 2014, Chambers co-wrote the New York Times bestseller Everybody’s Got Something with journalist, Robin Roberts.

In May 2016, Random House published 32 Yolks, the memoir Chambers co-authored with chef Eric Ripert. Chambers’ other memoir collaborations include Wake Up Happy with morning TV host and NFL Hall of Famer Michael Strahan and Emperor of Sound with multi-platinum producer Timbaland.

In 2017, Chambers edited The Meaning of Michelle: 16 Writers on Our Iconic First Lady, and How Her Journey Inspires Our Own. Time Magazine named it one of the top 10 non-fiction books of 2017. In 2012, Chambers received the James Beard Award for Best American Cookbook for her work onYes, Chef, which she co-authored with Marcus Samuelsson.

In 2018, she joined the Archival Storytelling Team at the New York Times, where she edits "Past Tense", a new initiative devoted to articles based on photographs from the newspaper's six million-photo archive. The following year (2019), Chambers edited Queen Bey: A Celebration of the Power and Creativity of Beyoncé Knowles-Carter.

== Magazine executive ==
As a Director of Brand Development at Hearst Corporation, Chambers and an executive team led the relaunch of Good Housekeeping and Goodhousekeeping.com. Chambers also developed and launched the magazine Glam Latina for Condé Nast and Women's Day Latina for the Hearst Company.

== Social impact ==
In 2014, Chambers and her husband, Jason, established the Loud Emily scholarship, in honor of Emily Fisher, Veronica's mentor in philanthropy. The Loud Emily scholarship provides full tuition for two girls to the Willie Mae Rock Camp for Girls in New York. The recipients are chosen based on their submissions of essays and short creative videos, explaining how and why they use their voices and music to speak about the causes they believe in. Chambers, with her husband, endowed three music and literature scholarships at Bard College at Simon's Rock.

== Works ==
- Between Harlem and Heaven: Afro-Asian-American Cookbook (Flatiron/Macmillan, 2018)
- The Meaning of Michelle: 16 Writers on Our Iconic First Lady and How Her Journey Inspires Our Own, Editor (St. Martin's Press, 2017)
- The Go-Between Young Adult novel (Delacorte/Random House, 2017)
- 32 Yolks (co-written with Eric Ripert) (Random House, 2016)
- Wake Up Happy (co-written with Michael Strahan) (37 Ink, 2015)
- Everybody’s Got Something (co-written with Robin Roberts) Grand Central Publishing, 2014)
- Yes Chef (co-written with Marcus Samuelsson) (Random House, 2012)
- Kickboxing Geishas: How Modern Japanese Women Are Changing Their Nation (Free Press, 2007)
- The Joy of Doing Things Badly: A Girls’ Guide to Love, Life and Foolish Bravery (Doubleday, 2006)
- Miss Black America (Doubleday, 2005)
- Celia Cruz, Queen of Salsa (Dial, 2005)
- Having It All? Black Women and Success (Doubleday, 2003)
- Double Dutch: Jump Rope, Rhyme and Sisterhood (Hyperion, 2002)
- Quinceañera Means Sweet Fifteen (Hyperion, 2001)
- Marisol & Magdalena (Hyperion, 1998)
- The Harlem Renaissance (Chelsea House, 1998)
- Amistad Rising (Harcourt Brace, 1998)
- Mama's Girl (Riverhead, 1996)
- Poetic Justice: Filmmaking South Central Style (Dell, 1992)

=== Anthology contributions ===
- The Bitch is Back, Editor Cathi Hanauer (William Morrow, 2016)
- Black Cool, Editor Rebecca Walker (Soft Skull, 2012)
- Mommy Wars, Editor Leslie Steiner (Random House, 2006)
- Rhetorical Contexts, Editors LouAnn Thompson and Suzanne Webb (Longman Publishers, 2003)
- ¿Que Te Parece? Editors James Lee, Doly Jesuita Young, et al. (McGraw Hill, 2003)
- The Bitch In the House: 26 Women Tell the Truth About Sex, Solitude, Work, Motherhood, and Marriage, Editor Cathi Hanauer (William Morrow, 2002)
- Black Hair: Art, Style and Culture, Editor Ima Ebong (Rizzoli, 2001)
- Listen Up: Voices of the Next Feminist Generation, Editors Barbara Findlen (Seal Press, 2001)
- Becoming American: Personal Essays by First Generation Women, Editor Meri Danquah (Hyperion, 2000)
- Growing Up Ethnic in America, Editor Maria Mazzioti Gilliam and Jennifer Gillian (Penguin Books, 1999)
