= Restaurant Aquavit =

Scandinavian restaurant in New York City

Coordinates: 40°45′38.86″N 73°58′19.99″W

Aquavit
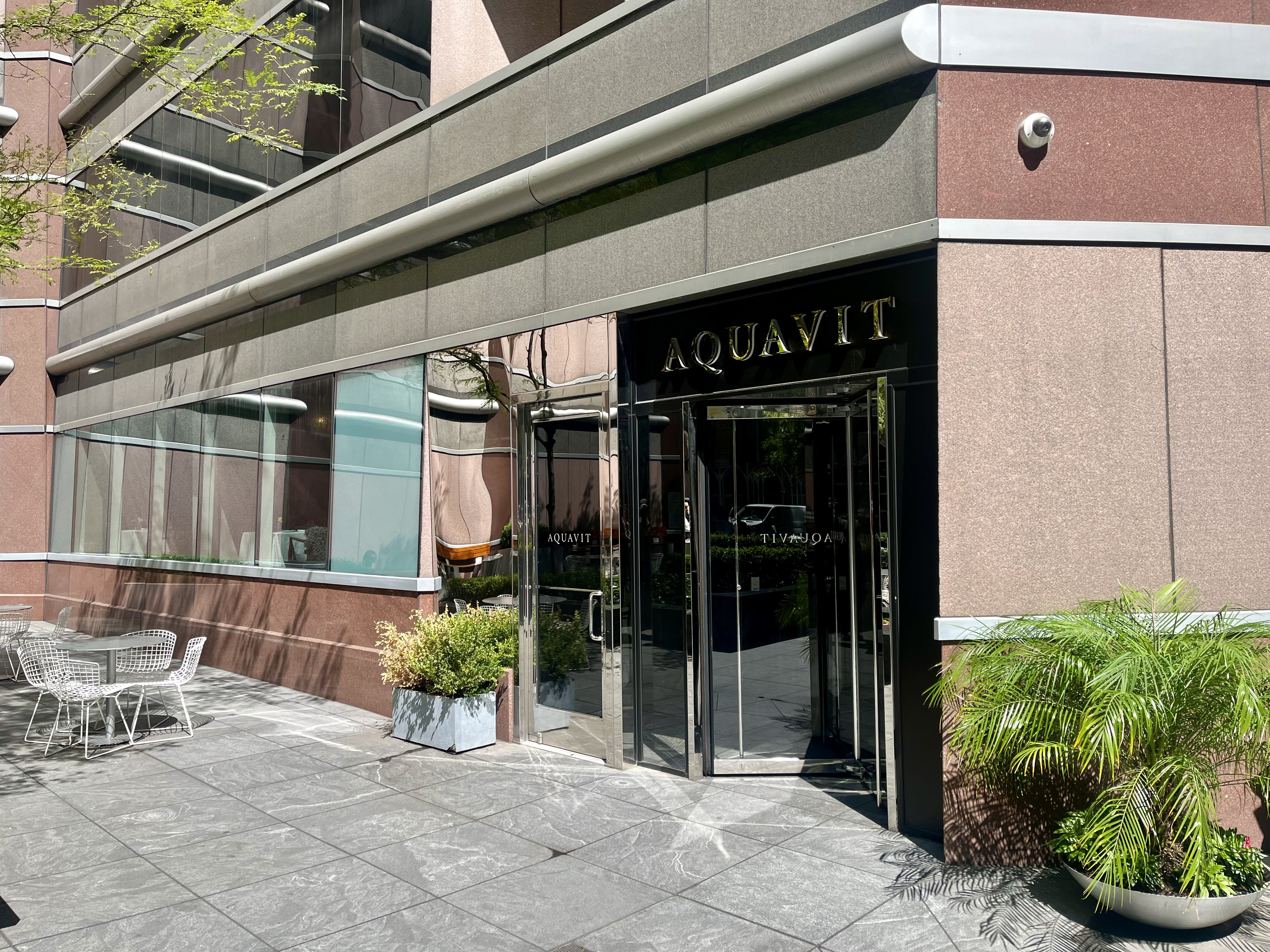
- The restaurant's exterior in 2024
- Interactive map of Aquavit

Restaurant information
- Established: 1987; 39 years ago
- Owner: Håkan Swahn
- Head chef: Emma Bengtsson
- Food type: Scandinavian
- Dress code: Smart casual
- Rating: (Michelin Guide)
- Location: 65 East 55th Street, New York City, New York, 10022
- Website: www.aquavit.org

Aquavit is a Scandinavian restaurant at 65 East 55th Street in Midtown Manhattan, New York City. In November 2016, an outpost was launched in London by Philip Hamilton.

== History ==
Aquavit was created and opened by Håkan Swahn in 1987 and was a pioneer in New York in creating two distinct dining rooms, a casual café with modern but rustic fare as well as a cutting-edge modern dining room. This was conceptually based on the Stockholm restaurant, Operakällaren, whose owner, Tore Wretman, was one of Aquavit’s original partners. With the arrival of Chef Marcus Samuelsson in 1995, Aquavit garnered greater culinary recognition.

After 17 years in one location (13 West 54th Street), Aquavit relocated in 2005 to new premises, giving the restaurant an entirely new look. Aquavit opened a second restaurant in Minneapolis, Minnesota in 1999, but it failed to take hold and ultimately closed in mid-2003.

Aquavit enjoyed a three-star rating from The New York Times from 1995 until 2010, and 2015 onward and was ranked by New York Magazine in 2006 as the 9th-best restaurant in New York.

In 2002 the cook book “Aquavit and the new Scandinavian Cuisine” was written by Marcus Samuelsson based on the food of the restaurant.

The Michelin-starred Aquavit outpost in Greater London, United Kingdom closed in 2023.

== Awards ==
The restaurant has received a number of awards and accolades, including:

- One star in the Michelin Guide in 2013–2014
- Two stars in the Michelin Guide in 2015–2023;
- Three-star rating by The New York Times in 2015
- AAA Five Diamond Award (2022–2025)
- Selected 9th-best restaurant in New York 2006 by New York Magazine
- Marcus Samuelsson voted Best Chef New York in 2003 by The James Beard Foundation
- Inducted in Restaurant Hall of Fame USA in 2000
- Receiving the Ivy Award
- Best Sunday Brunch New York Magazine

In 2013, Zagat gave it a food rating of 25.

== See also ==
- List of Michelin-starred restaurants in Greater London
- List of Michelin-starred restaurants in New York City
- List of Scandinavian restaurants
