= Town Lake Gazebo =

Historic gazebo by Lady Bird Lake in Austin, Texas

- U.S. National Register of Historic Places
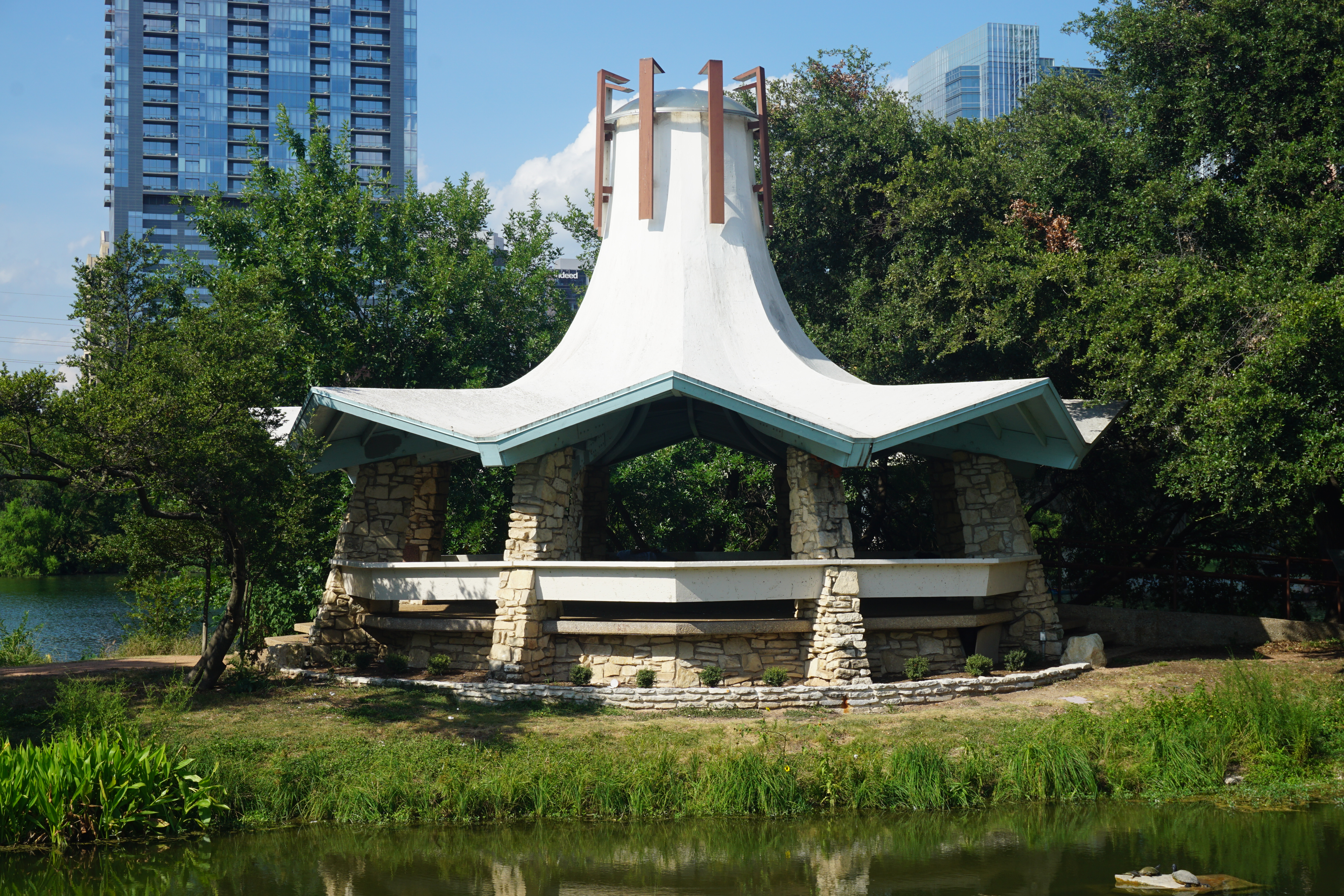
- Viewed from the south in 2019

- Location within Texas
- Location: 9307 Ann & Roy Butler Hike & Bike Trail; Austin, Texas
- Coordinates: 30.2624°N 97.7487°W
- Area: Less than 1 acre (0.40 ha)
- Built: August 1969
- Architect: J. Sterry Nill
- Architectural style: Modernist
- NRHP reference No.: 100004970
- Added to NRHP: February 7, 2020

The Town Lake Gazebo (also known as the Women in Construction Gazebo or Fannie Davis Town Lake Gazebo) is a historic gazebo on the south shore of Lady Bird Lake in Austin, Texas, beside Auditorium Shores. Built in 1969 to beautify the south shore of Lady Bird Lake, the gazebo was paid for by the National Association of Women in Construction and features eclectic architecture. The structure was listed on the National Register of Historic Places in 2020.

== History ==
In 1960 the completion of Longhorn Dam on the Colorado River created Lady Bird Lake (then known as Town Lake) on the south edge of downtown Austin, Texas. The next year the Austin City Council formed a Town Lake Study Committee to recommend plans for the development of public land on the shores of the new lake. In 1965 the Austin chapter of the National Association of Women in Construction approached the City with a proposal to contribute a civic structure to beautify the Town Lake shoreline. On November 9, 1965, City Council approved NAWIC's plan to build a public gazebo that would provide a scenic view of downtown Austin and of the lake from Auditorium Shores to the south.

In January 1966 the Austin chapter of NAWIC began raising funds for the project and revealed an early design with a mushroom-like dome meant to echo and complement the roof of the (now demolished) Palmer Auditorium. City leaders held a groundbreaking ceremony on July 1, 1968. The project cost an estimated $6,000 in cash (equivalent to $60,000 in 2025), and NAWIC persuaded local construction businesses and workers to make in-kind contributions valued around $30,000 (equivalent to $300,000 in 2025). Construction was repeatedly delayed because the work was provided by local builders and contractors on a pro bono basis. The gazebo was completed in August 1969, and the site was dedicated on June 8 of the following year at a ceremony including national NAWIC leaders and Austin Mayor Travis LaRue. It also set a precedent followed in 1978 when the Austin chapter of NAWIC helped to fund the restoration of the Austin Fire Drill Tower on the opposite shore of Town Lake.

In 1984 the gazebo received repairs and renovations, funded again by NAWIC, and the city officially renamed the structure the Fannie Davis Town Lake Gazebo in honor of one of the founders of NAWIC's Austin chapter. In 1992 the roof's oculus was covered with a transparent acrylic dome to keep out rain, and a wheelchair ramp was added in 1995. The most recent repairs and renovations were made in 2012. On February 7, 2020, the gazebo was added to the National Register of Historic Places in recognition of its eclectic architectural design and its significance as a piece of community-built civic infrastructure meant to beautify a public space. The City of Austin designated the gazebo a City of Austin Historic Landmark on February 27, 2025.

== Architecture ==
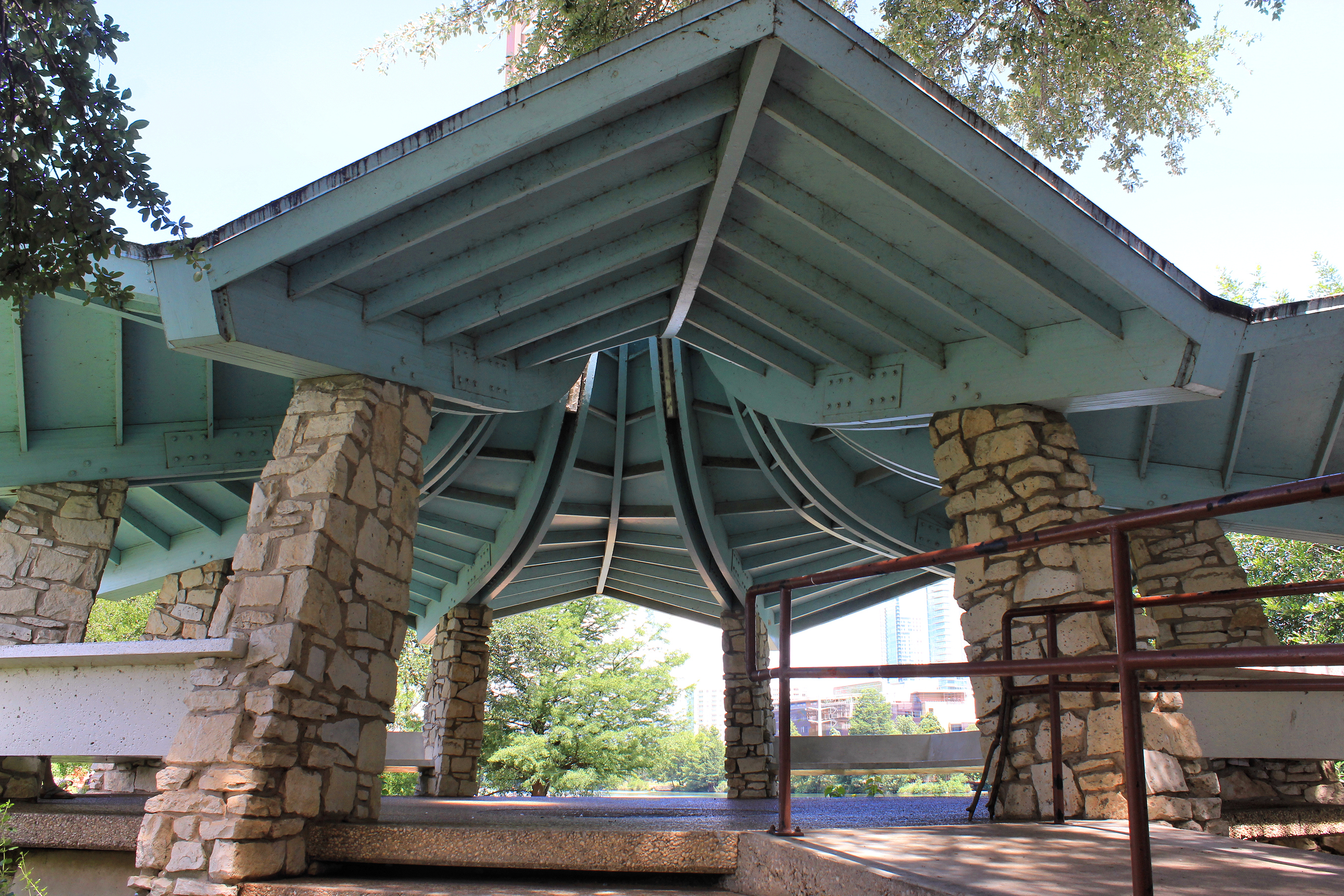
Interior view of the gazebo

The Town Lake Gazebo is an open-sided structure with a curving hyperbolic paraboloid roof supported by eight piers rising from a slightly elevated foundation. The reinforced concrete piers stand at the corners of an octagonal footprint and are faced with a stone veneer of rusticated limestone masonry. The columns angle slightly inward and taper toward the top, where they support curved rafters of glued laminated timber. The roof resembles an inverted funnel or morning glory flower, curving upward from a zig-zag lower edge to a central oculus at the top. The roof is made of folded plate plywood with a white roof coating on the exterior and light blue paint beneath. The interior has a pebble-finished concrete floor of around 900 square feet (80 m^{2}), with inward-facing precast concrete benches around the rim.

Early designs for the gazebo had it on a small island near the south shore of the lake, accessed by a footbridge, but it was ultimately built by the water's edge at Auditorium Shores. The gazebo was designed by architect J. Sterry Nill, the husband of NAWIC Austin chapter President Lori Nill. The structure's varied materials and contrasting stylistic elements make it difficult to assign a particular architectural style; its composition is modernist but eclectic, mixing elements of geometric Googie design with the rustic park architecture characteristic of outdoor public structures in Central Texas.

== See also ==
- National Register of Historic Places listings in Travis County, Texas
