= Austin Food & Wine Festival =

Food festival in Texas, United States

The Austin Food & Wine Festival was held for the first time in Austin, Texas, in 2012. It benefits the nonprofit Austin Food & Wine Alliance. Until 2011, the festival's predecessor has been the Texas Hill Country Food & Wine Festival.

== Festival ==
=== History ===
The Austin Food & Wine Festival was presented for the first time April 27–29, 2012, after the Texas Hill Country Wine and Food Festival, which had been held in Austin for 26 years, "transitioned" into the Austin Food & Wine Alliance as a nonprofit organization.

Headliners during the 2012 event, which was brought to Austin by Food & Wine magazine and C3 Presents, were celebrity chefs Masaharu Morimoto, Marcus Samuelsson, Michelle Bernstein, Gail Simmons and Tyson Cole. Music was by singer-songwriters Lucinda Williams and Mayer Hawthorne. There were 35 cooking demonstrations and wine and cocktail seminars. A tasting pavilion featured 80 wine, spirit and food exhibitors, with local and regional restaurants. Events were at Auditorium Shores and at Republic Square Park.

From November 6-8, 2026 the festival celebrated its 15th anniversary event.

=== Future ===
According to an announcement in November 2012, the chef and wine lineup for the 2013 Festival on April 26–28, 2013, includes Andrew Zimmern, Aaron Franklin, Paul Qui, Marcus Samuelsson, Adam Richman, Christina Tosi, Laura Sawicki and Jack Gilmore.

=== Partners ===
Partners for the festival include Tim Love, Tyson Cole, Jesse Herman and the C3 Presents organization, a concert promotion, event production and artist management company based in Austin.

== Alliance ==
The Austin Food and Wine Festival will benefit the nonprofit Austin Food & Wine Alliance, which is "dedicated to fostering awareness in the Central Texas culinary community through grants, educational programming and events." The Alliance will offer three grants totaling $20,000 to Central Texas "beverage artisans, producers, culinary professionals" or to people who "represent a culinary/food-focused non-profit." They are to be awarded on December 12, 2012, at the AT&T Executive Education and Conference Center at the McCombs School of Business in Austin.
