= Austin Public Health =

Health department in Texas, US

Department overview
- Jurisdiction: Austin, Texas
- Headquarters: 6800 Burleson Rd Building 310, Suite 295, Austin, TX 78744
- Department executive: Adrienne Sturrup, Director
- Website: www.austintexas.gov/department/health

Austin Public Health (Spanish: Salud Pública de Austin) is the official health department of the city of Austin, Texas, which operates programs to improve general health in the community.

== History ==
=== Background ===
Austin was the first municipality in Texas to include public health provisions in its incorporation act, approved in 1839 by the Congress of the Republic of Texas.

=== Accreditation and name change ===
Austin Public Health, then known as Austin/Travis County Health and Human Services Department, received accreditation from the national Public Health Accreditation Board in May 2016. The department adopted its current name that December.

== Leadership ==
- Adrienne Sturrup, Director
- Dr. Desmar Walkes, Medical Director and Health Authority
- Janet Pichette, Chief Epidemiologist
- Laura G. La Fuente, Assistant Director of Health Equity and Community Engagement
- Kymberley Maddox, Assistant Director of Administrative Support Services
- Donna Sundstrom, Assistant Director of Community Services
- Marcel Elizondo, Interim Assistant Director of Environmental Health Services
- Cassandra DeLeon, Assistant director of Disease Prevention and Health Promotion
- Jen Samp, Public Information and Marketing Manager

== Organization ==
Austin Public Health is composed of the following divisions which manage the listed services:

- Community Services
  - Women, Infants and Children program
  - Neighborhood centers
  - Family health unit
  - Day labor center
- Disease Prevention and Health Promotion
  - Chronic disease prevention and control
  - Communicable disease
  - Immunizations
  - Injury prevention
  - Refugee services
- Environmental and Health Services
  - Public health nuisances
  - Child care, foster care, and adoption housing
  - Food safety
  - Pool, spas, interactive water features & fountains
  - Mosquito and rodent control
- Epidemiology and Public Health Preparedness
  - Epidemiology and disease surveillance
  - Public health emergency preparedness
  - Vital records
- Health Equity and Community Engagement
  - Health equity initiative
  - Planning and evaluation
  - Social services
  - HIV resources administration
  - Community transformation (DSRIP) programs
