= Auditorium Shores =

Urban park in Austin, Texas, U.S.

Auditorium Shores at Town Lake Metropolitan Park
- Auditorium Shores
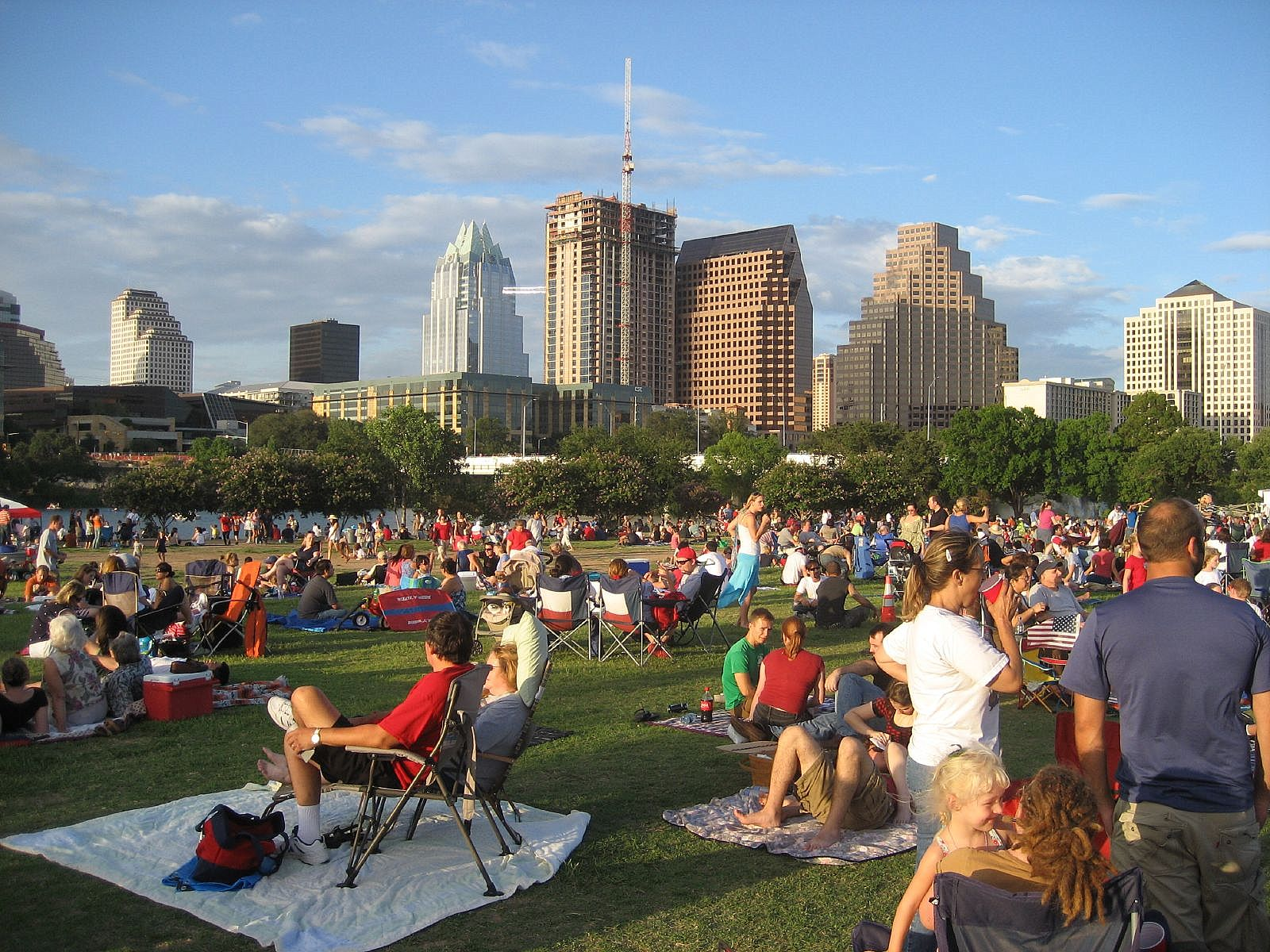
- Auditorium Shores during Independence Day in 2007
- Interactive map of Auditorium Shores at Town Lake Metropolitan Park
- Type: Public park
- Location: 800 W Riverside Dr; Austin, Texas 78704
- Coordinates: 30°15′41.76″N 97°45′14.4″W
- Area: 48.58 acres (19.66 ha)
- Created: 1959

Auditorium Shores is an urban park located in downtown Austin, Texas, within the larger Town Lake Park. Its name refers to its location between the former Palmer Auditorium and the shores of Lady Bird Lake. The park is known as the site of major music performances at South by Southwest and Fun Fun Fun Fest, as well as a number of other events.

== Location ==
Auditorium shores is located on the south shore of Lady Bird Lake, immediately west of South 1st Street. To its south are the Long Center and Palmer Events Center. The Town Lake Hike and Bike Trail passes through the park from west to east near the shore; one of the trail's major trailheads adjoins Auditorium Shores. The site includes a memorial statue of late Austin resident Stevie Ray Vaughan, who played a number of concerts at Auditorium Shores. The park is known for its large off-leash dog area by the water (though recent redevelopments have moved to reduce the space available for off-leash dogs) and its scenic view of the downtown Austin skyline. It is also the site of the Town Lake Gazebo, which sits by the shore at the park's northeast corner.

== Events ==
Auditorium Shores has long been a popular site for music performances, and is known today as a central site for several regional and national music festivals, such as Fun Fun Fun Fest and South by Southwest. It was also the site of the Austin Aqua Festival in the 1980s and '90s, and currently hosts some events for the Austin Food & Wine Festival. In 1999, Auditorium Shores hosted "King of the Hill Day", a public event held as part of the Big Stinkin' International Improv & Sketch Comedy Festival that included a free barbecue, lawn-mower races, and appearances by costumed likenesses of characters from King of the Hill. On May 25, 1987, the Gregg Allman performance at Auditorium Shores was recorded by the King Biscuit Flower Hour and broadcast at a later date.

== History ==
The park was opened in 1959 in conjunction with the completion of Palmer Auditorium. Auditorium Shores and the surrounding Town Lake Park received some improvements and renovations in conjunction with Palmer Auditorium's repurposing as the Long Center in 1999.

In 2013 C3 Presents, the company that operates the Austin City Limits Festival and the Austin Food & Wine Festival, announced that it would donate $3.5 million to fund renovations to the park, some of which would significantly reduce the space for off-leash dogs. The City Council's decision to make these changes created some controversy, largely over concerns that C3's large donation had allowed it to influence the council's decision to reduce the dog park.

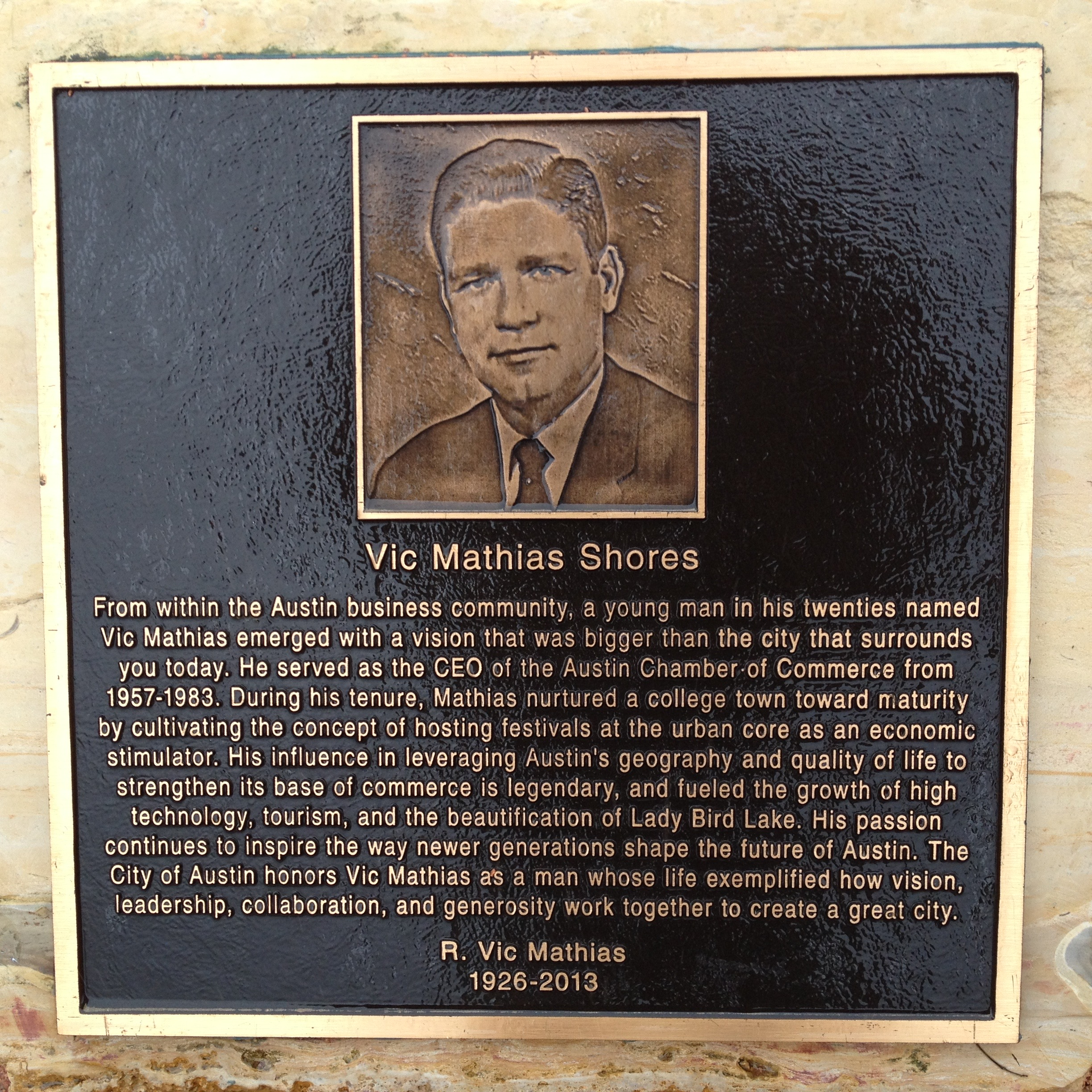
Plaque honoring Vic Mathias at the park's East Lawn

In 2015 the Austin City Council gave the East Lawn of the park the name "Vic Mathias Shores," in honor of Vic Mathias, a former Austin business leader who co-founded the Austin Aqua Festival.

== Funding difficulties ==
In November 1998, City of Austin voters authorized creation of the Town Lake Park Community Events Center Venue Project, funded by a tax on local car rentals to fund its construction. The project consisted of a new Palmer Events Center (PEC), development of a major metropolitan redevelopment on adjacent parkland, and a parking garage to serve both as well as the new Long Center for the Performing Arts. The parkland extended from Barton Springs Road to Lady Bird Lake and from South First Street to Lee Barton Drive, thus including Auditorium Shores Park. Under a Memorandum of Understanding, in Spring 1999, project stakeholders and nationally recognized professional planners and architects guided creation of a master plan for the project. In May–July, 1999, stakeholders and City Council accepted the master plan, along with a financing plan developed by Assistant City Manager Jim Smith, that would fund complete build-out of the finished project by 2007. The finance plan allowed construction funding for the PEC to exceed the City's bonding authority, and for park development to be completed in four phases on an accelerated schedule thanks to an inter-department line of credit of up to $6 million.

But in October 1999, staff presented to City Council the bond covenants contract governing the construction bond sale, the terms of which redefined the project and the financing authorized by voters and by Council. The bond covenants undermined the recently adopted Jim Smith finance plan by specifying a car rental tax funds dispersal "waterfall" such that covering any operations and maintenance (O&M) shortfall for the PEC would take complete priority over any park construction funding. The staff presentation of the covenants to City Council made no mention of rental tax dollars being redirected to O&M, and the covenants were adopted on consent without discussion. Jim Smith's August 2000 financial update to Council insisted that the park financing was on track and might even be accelerated, even though its underpinnings had been destroyed. Council remained uninformed of the waterfall until Spring 2002. The stakeholders who had brought the project successfully to the City and had been given a formal oversight role were not informed at all until mid-2003. Though the ballot language had only specified that the rental tax would fund construction, the bond covenants had redefined the ballot word "construction" to include operations and maintenance, and had reduced even the designation of park development to "any other legal purpose" under state law.

The financial impact of the waterfall scheme on the park project was devastating. Phase I of the park, the landscaping around the PEC, had been covered during the facility construction. Phase II, the development of what is now known as Butler Park, was delayed twice, for nearly three and a half years, resulting in a $4.43 million cost in lost park features and donations. Though allocated Phase II funding, along with a $480,000 donation from the Junior League of Austin that was declined by the City because of the delay, would have been adequate to construct Butler Park in 2002, by 2005 it was not. The waterfall guaranteed that all subsequent funding that the voters had authorized for park funding was being redirected to PEC operations and maintenance. Phases III and IV, covering the Auditorium Shores and lakefront area, were removed from the financial plan altogether, with staff citing insufficient funding.

The Convention Center Department enriched its employees personally with the windfall from the car rental tax redirection. The department had historically funded events center operations shortfalls from the City's hotel/motel occupancy tax, but the waterfall freed the bed tax revenue for other purposes. With much of their windfall, the department created a "Gainsharing Bonus Program" for their employees, which from 2001-2014 sent $7.2 million home as bonus pay, those benefiting most being the director and officers who put the waterfall in place and directed its cash flows. The bonuses were questionably justified for years, having been supported by performance reviews that Convention Center Department Director Bob Hodge falsified and for which he was indicted and fired. No other City department had ever had such a bonus pay program.

Project stakeholders pushed for correction of the structural financial problem caused by the waterfall. When the Gainsharing Bonus program was exposed by project stakeholders privately to City Council along with complaints about the waterfall scheme, the City quickly offered $7 million to "finish" the park. Though welcome, this offering failed to correct the structural issues with venue finance, and it was insufficient to realize the park as designed in the Master Plan or to meet the funding obligation under the Jim Smith plan.

Stakeholders also pressed the issue with City management. In Fall 2007, senior management pledged to stakeholders to formulate a plan to wean the Convention Center Department from the car rental tax. The City also initiated an update of the master plan in public workshops. When those workshops started to produce refined plans essentially consistent with the original master plan and that carried an estimated price tag of $22 million, the update process was abruptly halted.

When the management's promises came to nothing, stakeholders escalated their complaints. City Manager Marc Ott, confronted with the issues and with previous failure to deliver, responded not with a plan of action, but rather with a legal defense of the City's use of the rental tax money for PEC operations and maintenance.

=== Continued difficulties ===
In February 2011, the City declared that the $7 million allocated by the City's Chief Financial Officer for Phase III construction no longer existed, having been quietly spent almost entirely by the Convention Center Department. The Assistant City Manager over the venue project began maintaining that Auditorium Shores was not a part of the venue, overwhelming evidence to the contrary notwithstanding. City Management tried proposing that the remainder of park construction could be funded via the planned 2012 bond election. But since under state law ad valorem taxes would be ineligible for funding development within the Town Lake Park Venue District, and after receiving indications that the public, having already taxed themselves to fully pay for the park, might resist taxing themselves to pay for it again after the original funding was redirected, the idea was dropped.

Nevertheless, some progress on the park continued. A private donation of $3.5 million and a $1 million state grant matched by the City has funded some remedial infrastructure and ground improvements in Auditorium Shores and construction of a dog play area. In 2016, funding was allocated for construction of the Alliance Children's Garden, an exploratory play space within Butler Park, and for renovations to the Liz Carpenter Fountain that is a major attraction within the park. Completion of the garden is scheduled for April 2020. With that funding, the City will have met its obligations for funding Phase II of Town Lake Park, albeit 16 years late.

=== Consequences ===
To date, private donations park-wide have well exceeded the charitable component required in the original Jim Smith financial plan. But beyond the matching funds just mentioned, the City of Austin has failed to meet most of its obligation to fund Auditorium Shores redevelopment ($10.5 million in 1999 dollars). When aborted, planning efforts for that area had produced some new configurations that would realize the goal of making the park the "front porch" of the City. The cost of those plans have approximated in modern dollars the City's original obligations. But lacking that funding, the core of the park remains to be redeveloped.

The cost of delay has been steep. Adjusted for standard construction inflation measures and considering items removed from Butler Park on account of the delay, fulfilling the City's commitments under the Jim Smith financial plan will exceed $20 million. Still, the car rental tax revenue stream could allow recovery from all these shortfalls if spent as voters directed. From its inception in 1999, the car rental tax has generated nearly $47 million more than necessary to cover bond debt service, enough to have fully funded the complete park and the $6.8 million PEC construction overrun nearly twice over. The booming revenue stream from the City's hotel-motel occupancy taxes, the historical source for funding event center operations, could easily have covered PEC operations but has been protected by the City Manager from doing so. Original project stakeholders have reiterated to City Council their concern that the fiscal management of the project has prevented its fulfillment. Several generations of City Councils, including the 2019-2020 Council, have not challenged the City Manager on this point.

== See also ==
- Zilker Park
