= Marcus Samuelsson =

Ethiopian Swedish chef

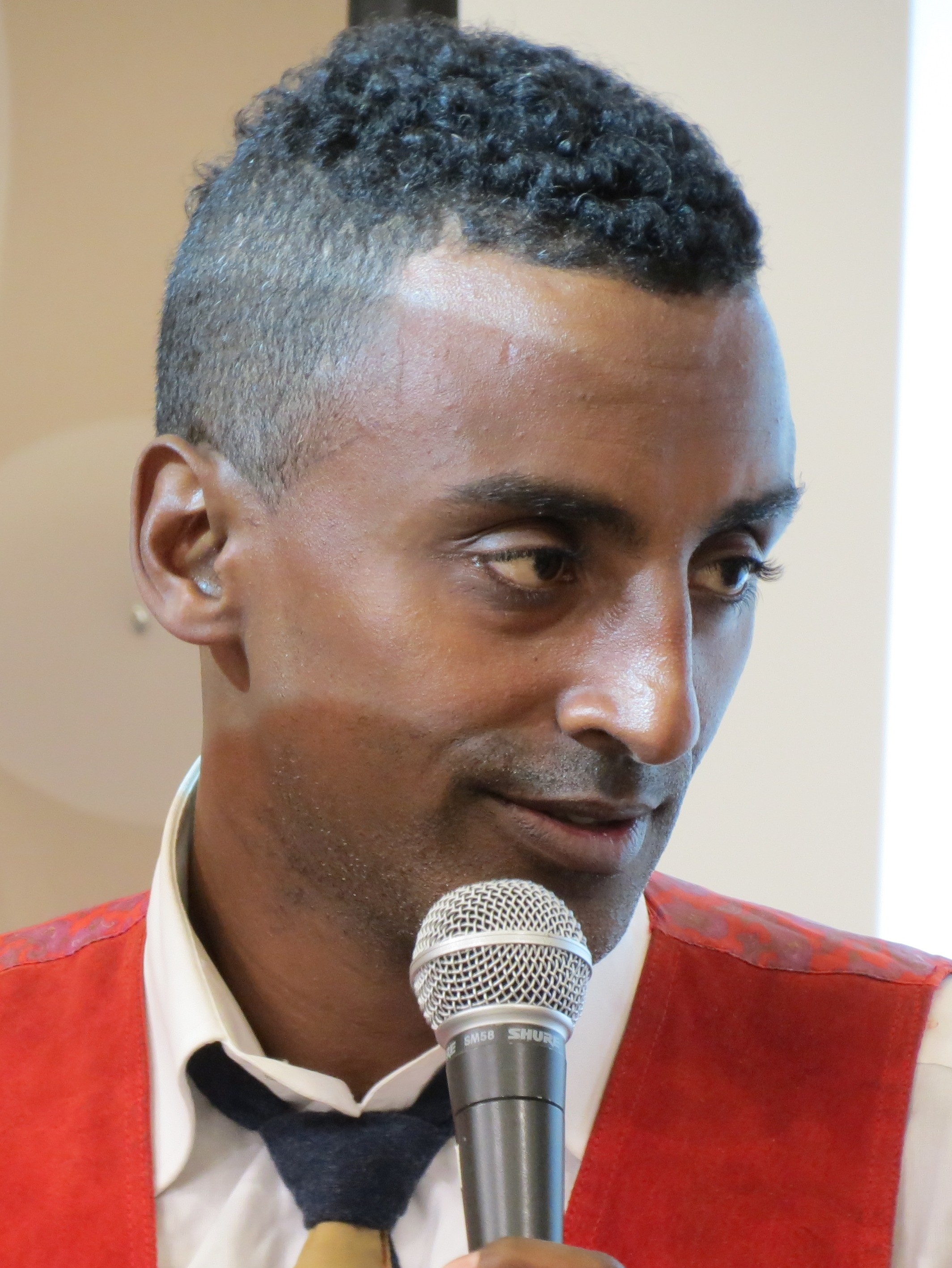
- Samuelsson at the 2012 Göteborg Book Fair
- Born: Kassahun Joar Tsegie ካሳሁን ጽጌ; 25 January 1971 (age 55); Ethiopian Empire
- Education: Culinary Institute; Gothenburg, Sweden
- Spouse: Maya Haile
- Children: 3 - 1 son, 2 daughters
- Culinary career
- Current restaurants
- Marcus B & P; Marc Burger; C-House; Street Bird; Ginny's; Red Rooster; Marcus Montreal; Swedish Supper Club
- Previous restaurants
- Aquavit; Riingo; SECOND; Red Rooster Shoreditch, London
- Television shows
- Inner Chef; Urban Cuisine; Top Chef Masters; Chopped; 24 Hour Restaurant Battle; The Taste; Celebrity Undercover Boss; No Passport Required; Guy's Grocery Games
- Awards
- Winner, International 2007 Winner, Writing and Literature 2013 Winner, Rising Star Chef of the Year 1999 Winner, Outstanding Personality/Host 2019 Winner, Who's Who of Food & Beverage in America 2016 Winner, Commercial/Sponsored Visual Media 2022 Winner, Best Chefs 2003 1999 James Beard Foundation award for "Rising Star Chef"; 2003 award for "Best Chef in New York City"
- Website: marcussamuelsson.com

Marcus Samuelsson (born Kassahun Joar Tsegie; Amharic: ካሳሁን ፅጌ; 25 January 1971) is an Ethiopian-born Swedish-American celebrity chef, restaurateur and television personality. He is the head chef of Red Rooster in Harlem, New York.

== Early life and education ==
Kassahun Joar Tsegie was born in the Ethiopian Empire. His biological father, Tsegie, is an Ethiopian Orthodox Tewahedo Church priest. His mother died in a tuberculosis epidemic when he was three years old. As detailed in Samuelsson's appearance on Anthony Bourdain: Parts Unknown he and his elder sister, Fantaye, were separated from their family during the turmoil of the Ethiopian Civil War that began in 1974. Subsequently, the siblings were adopted by Anne-Marie and Lennart Samuelsson, a homemaker and a geologist, respectively, who lived in Gothenburg, Sweden. The siblings' names were changed to Marcus and Linda Samuelsson. They also have an adopted sister, Anna Samuelsson. His biological father, Tsegie, the father of eight others (the chef's half-siblings), still resides in the Ethiopian village where Samuelsson was born.

After becoming interested in cooking through his maternal grandmother in Sweden, Samuelsson studied at the Culinary Institute in Göteborg (Gothenburg) where he was raised. He apprenticed in Switzerland and Austria then came to the United States in 1994 as an apprentice at Restaurant Aquavit.

== Career ==
At 24, Samuelsson became executive chef of Aquavit and soon afterwards became the youngest ever to receive a three-star restaurant review from The New York Times. In 2003, he was named "Best Chef: New York City" by the James Beard Foundation. The same year he started a second New York restaurant, Riingo, serving Japanese-influenced American food.

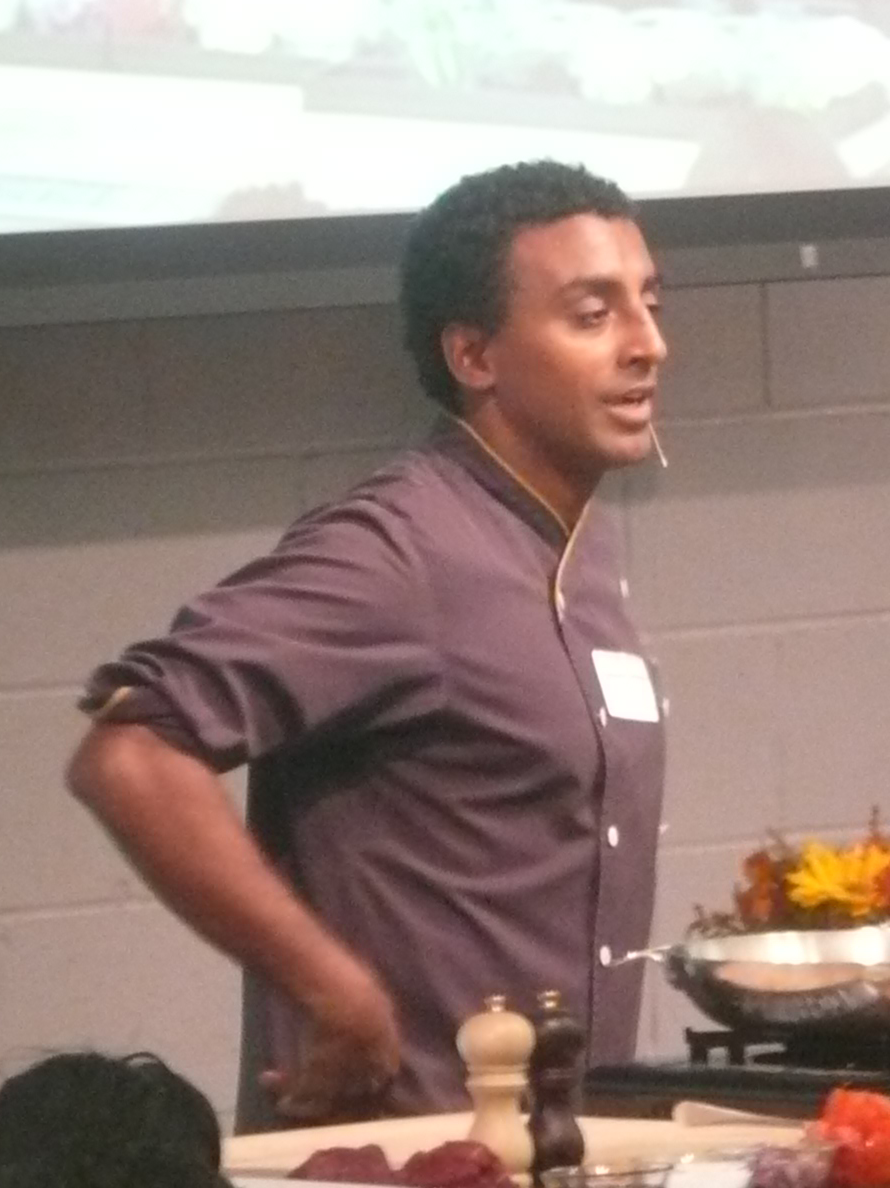
Marcus Samuelsson lecturing at Google in New York City (2007)

In addition to his recognition as a world-class chef, Samuelsson is a cookbook author with titles in both English and Swedish. His 2006 African-inspired cookbook The Soul of a New Cuisine received the prize "Best International Cookbook" by the James Beard Foundation. Other titles written by Samuelsson are Aquavit and the New Scandinavian Cuisine, En Smakresa ("A Journey of Flavour"), and Street Food.

Samuelsson is a Visiting Professor of International Culinary Science at the Umeå University School of Restaurant and Culinary Arts in Sweden. He had a television show, Inner Chef, which aired in 2005 on Discovery Home Channel and yet another program in 2008, Urban Cuisine on BET J (now Centric). He was a member of the Spitkicker artist collective in the early 2000s, which had strong hip-hop roots. His cooking combines international influences with traditional cuisines from Sweden to Japan and Africa.

On 24 November 2009, Samuelsson served as the guest chef for the first state dinner of the Barack Obama presidency. The dinner, in honor of Indian Prime Minister Manmohan Singh was served on the South Lawn and largely vegetarian. Samuelsson reportedly sought to combine sustainable and regional foods which reflect the best in American cuisine yet evoke the flavors of India. Harvesting fresh vegetables and herbs from the White House Garden, Samuelsson included red lentil soup, roasted potato dumplings, and green curry prawns on his menu. The tradition of guest chefs joining the White House chef for special events began during the Clinton administration.

Samuelsson is an advisor to The Institute of Culinary Education in New York City.

=== Restaurants ===
In December 2010, Samuelsson's first restaurant, Red Rooster, opened in Harlem.

In March 2011, Red Rooster hosted a fundraising dinner for the Democratic National Committee. President Obama attended the dinner. The US$30,800-per-plate (equivalent to $44,100 in 2025) event raised US$1.5 million (equivalent to $2 million in 2025).

In the fall of 2012, Samuelsson, together with Clarion Hotels, launched a restaurant concept called Kitchen & Table. The concept's first restaurant opened at Clarion Hotel Arlanda Airport, and from 2013 to 2014 it was held at all Clarion Hotels in Sweden and Norway.

In spring 2015, Samuelsson opened his second Harlem restaurant, Streetbird Rotisserie, a kitchenette with a menu inspired by cookouts focusing on fried and rotisserie chicken, and décor paying tribute to the hip-hop culture of Harlem. In 2015, Marcus partnered with the Hamilton Princess & Beach Club to open the restaurant Marcus' in the Bermuda hotel. The restaurant re-opened with a new menu and decor in March 2017. In late 2016, Samuelsson opened Marcus at MGM National Harbor in Oxon Hill, Md. and developed the room-service menu for the hotel. In November 2017 he opened a new restaurant, Marcus B&P on Halsey Street in Newark, New Jersey.

In spring 2019, Samuelsson announced the opening of Marcus at The Four Seasons Hotel in Montreal.

In fall 2023, Samuelsson opened a new restaurant, "Metropolis", inside the new Perelman Performing Arts Center (PACNYC) in downtown New York City, next to Ground Zero.

=== Media appearances ===
Samuelsson has been featured on television including on CNN, MSNBC's The Dylan Ratigan Show; he has been a judge on Guy's Grocery Games, Top Chef, Iron Chef USA, Iron Chef America, and Chopped making frequent guest appearances on Today. He previously hosted his own television shows, The Inner Chef and Urban Cuisine. He was also a judge on the TV One show My Momma Throws Down.

In early 2010, he competed alongside 21 world-renowned chefs on Bravo's television series Top Chef Masters. Samuelsson won the competition, earning $100,000 for UNICEF's grassroots effort The Tap Project. In 2011, he was a contestant on the fourth season of The Next Iron Chef competing against nine other chefs for the opportunity to be designated an "Iron Chef" and appear regularly on Iron Chef America. Samuelsson was eliminated in the fifth episode, finishing in sixth place.

After appearing consistently as a culinary judge on the Food Network show Chopped, Samuelsson competed in and won Chopped All Stars 2012: Judges Remix. He was awarded the grand prize of $50,000 for his charity, the Careers Through Culinary Arts Program. Samuelsson is a regular guest judge on Food Network shows Chopped, Chopped Junior, Beat Bobby Flay, Cooks vs. Cons, The Kitchen, and Star Plates.

On 28 June 2012, Samuelsson was the subject of an extensive interview on Fresh Air with Terry Gross on NPR.

In 2014, he made his debut as a judge on the second season of the American television series The Taste.

In 2015, he appeared in an episode of Anthony Bourdain: Parts Unknown with Ethiopia being the focus of that episode's visit.

Samuelsson appeared on 8 October 2016 in an episode of the radio show Wait Wait... Don't Tell Me!. He appeared on the Another Round podcast in June 2017.

In 2016, Samuelsson began making occasional appearances in videos produced for BuzzFeed's Tasty video series mostly providing food demonstrations as well as making a guest appearance in an episode of BuzzFeed's flagship food series Worth It in a segment filmed at Red Rooster where his fried chicken was declared series creator Steven Lim's personal "Worth It winner". In August 2018, Samuelsson officially joined Tasty as executive chef-in-residence.

In May 2017, Marcus Samuelsson appeared in the final episode of Undercover Boss to find and mentor new culinary talent.

Samuelsson appears as himself in the 2018 movie Scooby-Doo! and the Gourmet Ghost.

On 22 April 2019, Samuelsson appeared on Top Chef Canada Season 7, Episode 4 as a guest judge for a Nordic ingredients challenge.

On 13 October 2020, Samuelsson was introduced as the global brand advisor for Bon Appétit.

On 17 December 2022, Samuelson judged The Great Eyewitness News Holiday Cook-off.

=== No Passport Required ===
In July 2018, Samuelsson premiered a six-part series called No Passport Required on PBS. The series highlights and celebrates immigrant cultures and foods found in the United States. Samuelsson is both the host and executive producer of the series.

In 2019, PBS announced that the series would be renewed for a second six-episode season.

==== Episodes ====
Series	Episodes	Originally released	
Series	Episodes	First released	Last released
1	6	10 July 2018	14 August 2018
2	6	13 December 2019	17 February 2020

===== Season 1 (2018) =====
No. overall	No. in season	Title	Original release date	U.S. viewers (millions)
1	1	"Detroit"	10 July 2018	N/A
Chef Marcus explores the Middle Eastern community of Detroit.
2	2	"New Orleans"	1 July 2018	N/A
Chef Marcus discovers how Vietnamese residents have influenced the city in delicious ways.
3	3	"Chicago"	24 July 2018	N/A
Marcus visits the city's Mexican community to learn about its heritage and cuisine.
4	4	"Queens, NYC"	31 July 2018	N/A
Samuelsson goes inside the Indo-Guyanese community to explore its roots and cuisine.
5	5	"Miami"	7 August 2018	N/A
Chef Marcus explores the cuisine, culture and history of the city's Haitian community.
6	6	"D.C."	14 August 2018	N/A
Marcus Samuelsson dines, dances and dishes with the Ethiopian community in the nation's capital.

===== Season 2 (2019–20) =====
No. overall	No. in season	Title	Original release date	U.S. viewers (millions)
7	1	"Seattle"	13 December 2019	N/A
Chef Marcus explores the Filipino food and community in Seattle.
8	2	"Los Angeles"	20 January 2020	N/A
He explores Armenian food and community in Los Angeles, the largest Armenian community in the world outside of Armenia.
9	3	"Houston"	27 January 2020	N/A
Chef Marcus explores Nigerian food and community in Houston, Texas, the largest Nigerian community in the world outside of Nigeria.
10	4	"Philadelphia"	3 February 2020	N/A
Marcus Samuelsson heads to Philadelphia, where he meets new friends and old, and learns more about the city’s Italian food scene
11	5	"Las Vegas"	10 February 2020	N/A
Diverse Chinese food traditions in Las Vegas and chefs who are transforming their parents' cuisine.
12	6	"Boston"	17 February 2020	N/A
The Brazilian, Portuguese, and Cape Verdean communities in Boston and the South Coast communities of Fall River and New Bedford are explored.

== Books ==
Samuelsson has released cookbooks New American Table, The Soul of a New Cuisine, Marcus Off Duty, and The Red Rooster Cookbook.

In 2012, Samuelsson released Yes, Chef a memoir co-written with journalist Veronica Chambers about Samuelsson's early life and trajectory to becoming a chef. The book gained favorable reviews and won the James Beard Foundation award for Writing and Literature related to food.

After the success of Yes, Chef in 2015 Samuelsson published Make it Messy: My Perfectly Imperfect Life, aimed at young adults.

In 2020, Sameulsson released The Rise, a cookbook with Osayi Endolyn, Yewande Komolafe, Tamie Cook, and Angie Mosier. In interviews about the book, Samuelsson describes the book as a means to share the Black experience in food history.

== Personal life ==
Samuelsson is married to the model Gate (Maya) Haile. Their wedding was in Addis Ababa, Ethiopia. They live in Harlem. They have one son, Zion Mandela, and a daughter, Grace Ethiopia. Samuelsson also has an adult daughter; he supported her financially but did not otherwise participate in her upbringing. Samuelsson serves on the board at City Harvest and serves as co-chair of the board of directors for Careers Through Culinary Arts Program (C-CAP). He also has been a UNICEF ambassador since 2000, and he and his wife are the co-founders of the Three Goats Organization. Samuelsson is a keen football fan and an avid supporter of English Premier League club Arsenal F.C..

== Honors ==
- (Sweden) H. M. The King's Medal, 8th size, worn on a blue ribbon (6 June 2026)

== See also ==
- List of people from Harlem
