= The Secret Life of... (TV series) =

American television program focused on food

The Secret Life of... was a television show on the Food Network originally hosted by Jim O'Connor, then later by George Duran. It had a total of eight seasons, airing between 2003 and 2008.

The ellipsis in the title refers to the food item or style of food which is featured during the 30 minute program. Episode topics included: cookies, steak, comfort foods, coffee, tailgating and popcorn. The show combined history segments with recipe segments. The history segments highlight key events in a food's history, usually including where it originated. In the recipe segments, George travels to different parts of America to become an "assistant" in the kitchen of a store or restaurant which specializes in the item featured in the episode.

Actor Jim O'Connor hosted the show for the first several years of it being aired. During the O'Connor era, the show ended with the "Jim O'Connor Road Show" where Jim highlighted locations and festivals which celebrate food in unique ways.

On of April 23, 2007 (April 2 was the date announced in aired promos) George Duran took over hosting duties for the rest of the show's run. George Duran was formerly the host of Food Network's Ham on the Street.

The series was developed by Sara Hutchison and Kerry Lambert for Greystone Television. Kerry Lambert was the show runner for 7 of its 8 seasons. Writers and Directors on the series include Scott Burgin, Phil Brody, Artemis Fannin, and David Case, according to IMDb.
