= Magnus Nilsson (chef) =

Swedish chef

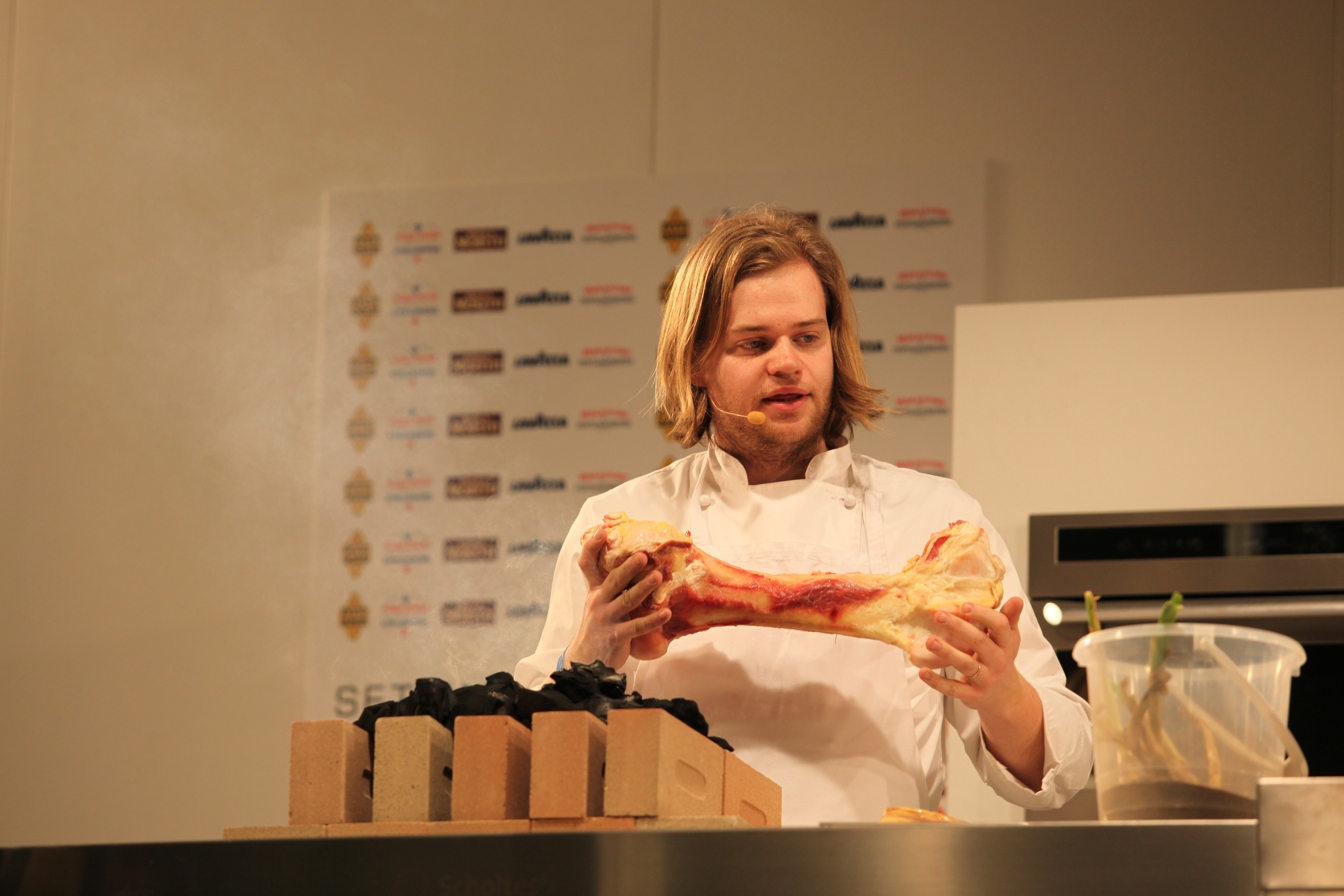
- Nilsson, at Identità Golose 2011
- Born: 28 November 1983 (age 42); Sundsvall, Sweden
- Culinary career
- Cooking style: New Nordic

Magnus Nilsson (born 28 November 1983) is a Swedish chef who was head chef at the restaurant Fäviken in Sweden until it closed in December 2019. He had previously worked at L'Astrance and L'Arpège in France, before moving onto Fäviken in 2008, which was ranked the 57th best restaurant in the world and won two Michelin stars in 2016.

== Career ==
Although a family story is told of Nilsson cooking his first meal at the age of three, his first culinary memory is of chopping cucumbers at his grandmother's farm. He had originally wanted to become a marine biologist, but instead attended a culinary school in Åre, Sweden.

He moved to Paris and began to work at the Michelin starred restaurant L'Arpège under Alain Passard. He worked there for a couple of weeks before being fired as he was finding it hard to understand the other chefs as his French wasn't as good as he initially thought it was. He joined the team at Pascal Barbot's L'Astrance and worked there for the next three years.

Afterwards he took a break from cooking, and decided to become a wine writer. He had become disillusioned with cooking after he returned to his homeland as he found it hard to source ingredients in Sweden that were as good as those in France, and he also felt that the dishes he was putting together were simply copies of those from Barbot. After he attended oenology school, he was recruited in 2008 to put together a wine cellar as a sommelier by the new owner of the Fäviken estate, some 600 kilometres (370 mi) north of Stockholm, near Åre where he had attended cooking school. He was originally under contract for three months, which was extended to a year when he began working at the restaurant. After failing to find a chef to work there, he returned to the kitchen himself and became head chef.

After initially ordering ingredients from around the world, the restaurant became known for using local produce. Nilsson grows and hunts much of the ingredients locally. Because of the local climate over the winter, efforts are made to preserve ingredients, Nilsson said "We say goodbye to fresh ingredients on the first of October, and then we don't see them again until April." Due to the techniques and sourcing of ingredients that Nilsson uses, comparisons have been made to René Redzepi of Noma. In 2010, Bruce Palling of The Wall Street Journal, included Nilsson in his list of the top ten young chefs in Europe.

In 2014, season 3 of PBS's The Mind of a Chef series featured chef Nilsson in episodes 9 through 16. Each episode showed a different aspect of the chef's interest in Nordic cuisine and traditions and his process in creating dishes for Fäviken. Episode 16, titled "Fäviken," gave viewers a behind-the-scenes look during a dinner service at the restaurant.

In 2015, Nilsson was one of six chefs featured on the first season of Netflix's original documentary program, Chef's Table.

In May 2019, Nilsson announced that he plans to stop working as of 14 December 2019 and focus on his family and his hobbies.

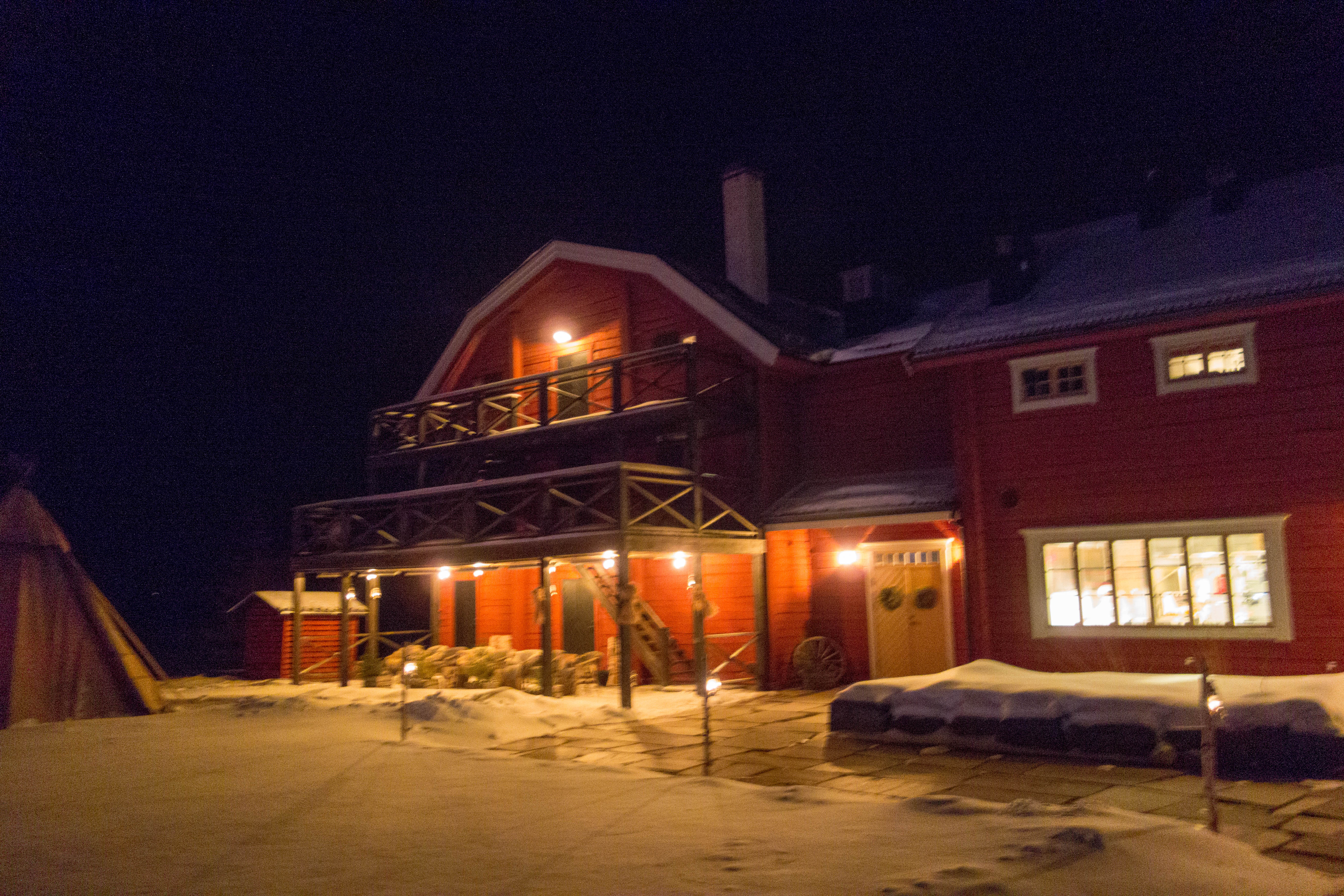
The Fäviken estate in Jämtland, Sweden

== Personal life ==
Nilsson, who lives in nearby Mörsil, likes to go hunting, particularly for black grouse. As of 2009, he owns a gun dog named Krut. He and his wife Tove have four children.

== Published works ==
- Nilsson, Magnus (2012). Fäviken. London: Phaidon. ISBN 978-0714864709.
- Nilsson, Magnus (2015). The Nordic Cookbook. London: Phaidon. ISBN 978-0714868721.
- Nilsson, Magnus (2016). Nordic: A Photographic Essay of Landscapes, Food and People. Phaidon.
- Nilsson, Magnus (2018). The Nordic Baking Book. London: Phaidon. ISBN 978-0714876849.
- Nilsson, Magnus (2020). Fäviken: 4015 Days, Beginning to End. London: Phaidon. ISBN 1838661255.
