= Marc Vidal (chef) =

American chef (born 1977)

- Born: 9 July 1977 (age 48); Barcelona, Spain
- Education: Escola de Restauracio i Hostelatge de Barcelona, (1996-1999)
- Culinary career
- Cooking style: Spanish
- Current restaurant(s): Boqueria, New York City (SoHo); Boqueria, New York City (Flatiron); Boqueria, Washington, D.C.
- Previous restaurant(s): Solea South Beach, Florida; Por Fin, Coral Gables, Florida, (2006-2009)
- Website: boquerianyc.com

Marc Vidal (born 9 July 1977) is a Spanish chef from Barcelona. He is the executive chef of Boqueria in New York City and Washington, D.C.

== Education and career ==
Vidal was born and raised in Barcelona, and worked in his family's restaurant. He pursued a culinary education at Escola de Restauracio i Hostelatge de Barcelona in 1996, receiving two degrees. Shortly after graduating, he began an internship at Can Gaig, a Michelin starred restaurant. He spent a year at Maison de la Catalogne in Paris. After returning to Barcelona, he worked as a pastry chef at the Windsor restaurant. He then went on to work at elBulli, L'Arpège and restaurant Alain Ducasse, acquiring experience under several notable European chefs including Alain Passard, Alain Ducasse and Ferran Adria.

Vidal left Paris, returning to Barcelona in 2002. He worked at restaurant Ot and two years later, became the executive chef of Visual in the Torre Catalunya hotel. Vidal moved to the U.S. and opened Por Fin restaurant in Coral Gables, Florida in December 2006. In 2009, he became executive chef at Solea at the W Hotel in South Beach.

=== Boqueria ===
In September 2010, Vidal became the executive chef for restaurateur Yann de Rochefort's tapas restaurant, Boqueria, in New York. Vidal replaced chef Seamus Mullen at Boqueria's locations in Flatiron and SoHo. Vidal opened a third Boqueria location on Dupont Circle in Washington, D.C. in March 2012. Boqueria is named after Mercat de la Boqueria, a popular food market in Vidal's home city of Barcelona.
