= Michael Anthony (chef) =

American chef

Michael Anthony (born 1968) is an American chef.

== Background and education ==
Anthony grew up in Cincinnati, Ohio, and graduated from Indiana University Bloomington with degrees in Business, French, and Japanese. He studied cooking at the École Supérieure de Cuisine Française - Ferrandi.

He has three daughters and currently lives in New York City.

== Professional career ==
Anthony began his culinary career under the guidance of Shizuyo Shima in Tokyo, Japan.

He moved to France in 1992 and attended cooking school at L'ecole Ferrandi, in Paris. Following that, he spent years training and working in several kitchens. Anthony returned to the United States, working first in the kitchen of Restaurant Daniel and then as the Chef de Cuisine at March Restaurant. Subsequently, he joined the team of Blue Hill as co-Chef of the Manhattan restaurant and later as the Executive Chef at Blue Hill Stone Barns.

In September 2006, Anthony took the position of executive chef at Gramercy Tavern. In 2011, he was named Chef-Partner of Gramercy Tavern.

In 2014, he was also named Executive Chef and Managing Director of Untitled and the Studio Cafe at the downtown Whitney Museum of American Art, overseeing operations, wine, food and beverage.

Anthony and Saveur founding editor Dorothy Kalins co-authored The Gramercy Tavern Cookbook (published by Clarkson Potter) and V is for Vegetable (published by Little, Brown and Company).

== Social activism ==
Anthony is a council member of City Harvest's Food Council and a supporter of the Garden Program at PS 41.

== Accolades ==
- "Best New Chefs" in Food & Wine magazine's chef category in 2002
- Three Stars from The New York Times for "Blue Hill at Stone Barns"
- Three Stars from The New York Times for "Gramercy Tavern" 2007
- "Best New Chef" in Time Out New York's New York City category in 2007
- Gramercy Tavern, Michelin Guide, One Star
- Three Stars from The New York Times for "Gramercy Tavern" 2016

=== James Beard Awards ===
Winner

- (2016) Vegetable Focused and Vegetarian (V Is for Vegetables: Inspired Recipes & Techniques for Home Cooks)
- (2015) Outstanding Chef (New York, New York)
- (2012) Best Chefs In America (New York, New York)
- (2008) Outstanding Restaurant (Gramercy Tavern)

Nominated

- (2015) Outstanding Chef (New York, New York)
- (2011) Best Chefs In America (New York, New York)
- (2010) Best Chefs In America (New York, New York)
- (2009) Best Chefs In America (New York, New York)
- (2008) Best Chefs In America (New York, New York)

== Bibliography ==
- The Gramercy Tavern Cookbook (2012), ISBN 0307888339
- V is for Vegetables: Inspired Recipes & Techniques for Home Cooks—from Artichokes to Zucchini (2015, Little, Brown and Company), ISBN 0316373354
