= Fumiko Kono =

Japanese personal and business chef (born 1969)

- Born: 狐野扶実子; 25 August 1969 (age 56); Tokyo, Japan
- Occupation: chef
- Years active: 1997–present
- Known for: Japanese-French fusion

Fumiko Kono (Japanese: 狐野扶実子 born 1969) is a Japanese personal and business chef who prepares fusion dishes of French and Japanese cuisine. Classically trained at Le Cordon Bleu in Paris, she has cooked for celebrities throughout the world, been the featured subject of documentaries, and has written her own cookbooks.

== Early life ==
Fumiko Kono was born on 25 August 1969 in Tokyo, Japan. As a child, Kono, who plays the cello wanted to become a musician, but she also gained an appreciation and love of food from her great-uncle, Tatsujiro. As her grandfather had died during World War II, her great-uncle filled his place in her life, teaching her about combining high-quality ingredients. He was an untrained cook, but had a refined palate and used fresh herbs to season his dishes, teaching Kono that flavor mixing was not arbitrary, but due to skill. She graduated in 1993 from Seijo University with diplomas in English literature and linguistics. (Note: News Store says that she graduated from the Department of English at the university's Faculty of Arts and Literature, not that she acquired two diplomas.) She moved to France that same year to begin studies on French civilization (Note: News Store says that she studied abroad with the intention of learning the French language.) and had plans to become a journalist. Without any prior knowledge of French, Kono rented a studio apartment on Rue Vieille-du-Temple, decided to remain in France and married a Japanese journalist, who was based in Paris. After being invited to dinner at L'Arpège, she discovered French cuisine and decided to enroll in classes at Le Cordon Bleu, graduating with honors in 1997.

== Career ==
Kono made her restaurant debut with chef Reine Sammut in 1997 and soon after went to work for Alain Passard as a kitchen assistant. Passard's philosophy was similar to her great-uncle's, in that he taught her that artistry must come from quality products. He taught her that colors, shapes, odors, and taste must be rigorously selected. She studied with him for three years, working her way up the ladder at his restaurant L'Arpège to become his second chef. She did not like being in charge of other employees and left after a few months to begin working as a personal chef. Taking on international clients, Kono traveled worldwide cooking for celebrities, like Dany Boon, Bernadette Chirac, Judith Godrèche and others. In 2004, she designed a menu with French chef Richard Pommiès for Laurent Taieb's restaurant "Le Kong", which features Japanese-French fusion cuisine. The following year, Frédéric Laffont produced a documentary about her as part of his series "Secrets de cuisine" which was broadcast on France 5. In 2005, Fauchon hired her as head chef of salty products and she revised several of their standards catering options, to create a lighter more international flair. She cooked risottos with Japanese rice, developed a lighter version of the house specialty Norwegian eggs and created a best-seller in the catering department, skewers of scallops with lemongrass.

Kono began publishing cookbooks in 2007 with her most noted publication being La Cuisine de Fumiko (2009). In 2009, she was recruited to teach at the Alain Ducasse chef's cooking school on Rue de Longchamp in Paris and the following year, Kono opened a bistro, "Benoit", in Tokyo making her permanent home in Japan. She continued to travel acting as a personal chef for private functions worldwide, wrote food editorials, a guide to Parisian restaurants, and participated in several Japanese cooking shows. Kono has served as a guest chef for the Galeries Lafayette in Paris and Maison Hermès of Tokyo. Since 2013, Kono has been one of the chefs creating food for Japan Airlines and in 2016, introduced a children's menu for the company. In 2014, she was asked by Ducasse to participate in an event held at the Palace of Versailles to celebrate French gastromony. Ducasse also offered Kono a six-month-long contract to serve as guest chef for the patio at his Plaza Athénée hotel in Paris. Kono's menu was so successful, two years later it was still served as part of the offerings of chef Mathieu Emeraud for the Garden Courtyard of Plaza Athénée.

== Selected works ==
- Kono, Fumiko (2007). Fumiko no yawarakana yubi: Ryōri no umareru fūkei (in Japanese). Tōkyō, Japan: Asahi Shuppansha. ISBN 978-4-255-00384-9.
- Kono, Fumiko; Gaudry, François-Régis (2009). La Cuisine de Fumiko (in French). Paris, France: Editions Albin Michel. ISBN 978-2-226-18768-0.
- Kono, Fumiko; Hall, Jean-Blaise (2010). Die fabelhaften Rezepte der Fumiko (in German). Munich, Germany: Collection Rolf Heyne. ISBN 978-3-899-10467-7.
- Kono, Fumiko (2011). Fumiko's Kitchen: kono fumiko no bisutoro ryōri (in Japanese). Tokyo, Japan: Purejidentosha. ISBN 978-4-833-45046-1.
- Fumiko, Kono (2014). Sekai shutchō ryōrinin (in Japanese). Tōkyō, Japan: Kadokawa. ISBN 978-4-041-10554-2.
