= Listed buildings in Jämtland County =

There are 95 listed buildings (Swedish: byggnadsminne) in Jämtland County.

== Berg Municipality ==
| Image | Name | Premise | Number of buildings | Year built | Architect | Coordinates | ID |
|---|---|---|---|---|---|---|---|
| | Ovikens prästgård | Ovikens prästbord 1:35, 1:1 | 2 | | | 62.99564°N 14.39382°E | 21000001537340 |
| | Skålans bensinstation | Skålan 1:46 | 2 | | | 62.64452°N 14.15496°E | 21300000008723 |
| | Svensåsen | Svensåsen 2:1 | 2 | | | 62.96960°N 14.41399°E | 21300000017112 |
| | Tomtangården | klövsjö 4:31 | 14 | | | 62.52392°N 14.18579°E | 21000001538203 |
| | Tunvågen | Tunvågen 5:1 | 2 | | | 62.90897°N 14.54902°E | 21300000015048 |
| | Västgården | Fäste 2:17 | 1 | | | 62.92947°N 14.49881°E | 21300000016323 |
| | Öst om ån (Hovermo gårdsmuseum) | Hovermo 1:29 | 14 | | | 62.88307°N 14.36082°E | 21300000008724 |

== Bräcke Municipality ==
| Image | Name | Premise | Number of buildings | Year built | Architect | Coordinates | ID |
|---|---|---|---|---|---|---|---|
| | Boddas bönhus | Bodsjö prästbord 1:8 | 1 | | | 62.83917°N 14.94976°E | 21300000008726 |
| | Dansbanan Granparken | Finnäs S:2 | 3 | | | 62.78433°N 14.96987°E | 21300000026527 |
| | Dubbelbod i Sidsjö | Sidsjö 3:13 | 2 | | | 62.72950°N 15.15849°E | 21300000008739 |
| | Härbre i Östansjö | Östansjö 3:10 | 1 | | | 63.01186°N 16.33017°E | 21300000008747 |
| | Härbre, lada Norrböle | Böle 2:3 | 3 | | | 62.90727°N 14.85260°E | 21300000008727 |
| | Ljungå kapell Begravningsplats | Ljungå 1:1 | 2 | | | 62.75986°N 16.30058°E | 21300000023382 |
| | Norgårn i Hållborgen (Antesgården) | Hållborgen 1:14 | 3 | | | 62.95775°N 14.99995°E | 21300000008748 |
| | Strömsågen i Sidsjö | Hunge 2:16 previously Sidsjö 3:30 | 1 | | | 62.73404°N 15.13247°E | 21300000008744 |
| | Tavnäs föreningshus | Tavnäs 1:21 | 1 | | | 62.97856°N 15.19999°E | 21300000008749 |
| | Öretjärndalen | Öretjärndalen 1:14 | 5 | | | 62.81565°N 15.57025°E | 21300000008745 |

== Härjedalen Municipality ==
| Image | Name | Premise | Number of buildings | Year built | Architect | Coordinates | ID |
|---|---|---|---|---|---|---|---|
| | Bod i Eggen | Eggarna 9:1 | 1 | | | 62.01407°N 14.30132°E | 21300000008774 |
| | Duvberg | Duvberg 4:18 | 12 | | | 62.10968°N 14.25967°E | 21300000008779 |
| | Halvars | Sunnanå 18:2, 20:2 | 12 | | | 61.84053°N 14.06711°E | 21300000008788 |
| | Halvars | Sunnanå 19:4 | none | | | | 21300000020052 |
| | Härbre (Fiskarstuga) i Älvros | Älvros kyrkby 5:8 | 1 | | | 62.08620°N 14.62144°E | 21300000008754 |
| | Härbre i Eggen | Eggarna 7:12 | 1 | | | 62.02016°N 14.30929°E | 21300000008770 |
| | Högen | Lillhärdals kyrkby 19:7 | 17 | | | 61.84961°N 14.06478°E | 21300000008796 |
| | Jo Jonsvallen | Älvros kyrkby 6:6 | 10 | | | 62.09154°N 14.59879°E | 21300000008763 |
| | Kvistabäckens flottled | Flor 14:11 | none | | | 62.10969°N 15.37325°E | 21300000008750 |
| | Lada i Herrö | Herrö 14:11 | 1 | | | 62.02017°N 14.20470°E | 21300000008764 |
| | Remsgården | Remmet 1:10 | 10 | | | 62.12516°N 14.16271°E | 21300000008757 |
| | Remsågen | Samfällighet inom Överberg 15:16 | 1 | | | 62.13793°N 14.17478°E | 21300000008767 |
| | Torpet Halla | Ängersjö 17:6 | none | | | 61.97952°N 14.82505°E | 21300000015786 |
| | Tröskloge i Eggen | Eggarna 7:3 | 1 | | | 62.01450°N 14.30608°E | 21300000008778 |
| | Vallgården | Överberg 39:6 | 9 | | | 62.12597°N 14.16059°E | 21300000008755 |
| | Vemhåns vadmalsstamp | Vemdalens kyrkby s:79 | 1 | | | 62.33608°N 13.97501°E | 21300000008751 |

== Krokom Municipality ==
| Image | Name | Premise | Number of buildings | Year built | Architect | Coordinates | ID |
|---|---|---|---|---|---|---|---|
| | Ede föreningshus | Offerdals prästbord 1:19 previously Prästbordet 1:19 | 1 | | | 63.46441°N 14.01338°E | 21300000008804 |
| | Fjällglim | Åkersjön 1:37 | 3 | | | 63.76881°N 14.06227°E | 21000001297203 |
| | Grafsgården | Kingsta 1:9 | 7 | | | 63.32815°N 14.30586°E | 21300000008809 |
| | Hissmofors folkets hus | Hägra 3:8 | 1 | | | 63.32775°N 14.47806°E | 21300000008798 |
| | Härbre i Föllinge | Föllinge-Nyland 3:6 | 1 | | | 63.67444°N 14.61141°E | 21300000008867 |
| | Kroksgård | Kroksgård 3:1 | 7 | | | 63.29742°N 14.45480°E | 21300000008797 |
| | Laxvikens bygdegård | Laxviken 2:25 | 4 | | | 63.80254°N 14.71859°E | 21000001469820 |
| | Myhrbodarna | Valsjön 1:2 | 14 | | | 64.08857°N 14.23447°E | 21300000008812 |
| | Per-Hansagården | Gunnarvattnet 1:68 previously Gunnarvattnet 1:52 | 2 | | | 64.12219°N 14.13241°E | 21300000008811 |
| | Önet (Ol-Jonsgården) | Offerdals-Önet 1:14 | 10 | | | 63.51552°N 13.89465°E | 21300000008803 |
| | Önet; Parstuga; Bakstuga | Offerdals-Önet 3:12 | 2 | | | 63.51361°N 13.89499°E | 21300000008802 |

== Ragunda Municipality ==
| Image | Name | Premise | Number of buildings | Year built | Architect | Coordinates | ID |
|---|---|---|---|---|---|---|---|
| | Aspnäset | Aspnäset 1:9 | 6 | | | 63.41328°N 15.58253°E | 21300000008884 |
| | Markusgården | Skyttmon 4:21 previously Skyttmon 7:1 | 3 | | | 63.41333°N 15.60525°E | 21300000008873 |
| | Ragunda tingshus | Näset 2:37 | 3 | | | 63.05754°N 16.41100°E | 21300000008870 |
| | Strånäset | Stugubyn 3:182 previously Stugubyn 3:32 | 6 | | | 63.16084°N 15.78645°E | 21300000008869 |

== Strömsund Municipality ==
| Image | Name | Premise | Number of buildings | Year built | Architect | Coordinates | ID |
|---|---|---|---|---|---|---|---|
| | Hoting 1:32 | Hoting 1:32 | 4 | | | 64.10646°N 16.19385°E | 21300000005847 |
| | Lövöns gamla kraftverk | Vågdalen 1:39, 1:112, 1:113 | 9 | | | 63.78801°N 15.72684°E | 21300000015292 |
| | Näsets såg i Rossön | Bodums-Näset | 2 | | | 63.91185°N 16.29886°E | 21000001470380 |
| | Trångåsen | Trångåsen 1:9 | 14 | | | 63.79823°N 15.92261°E | 21300000009602 |

== Åre Municipality ==
| Image | Name | Premise | Number of buildings | Year built | Architect | Coordinates | ID |
|---|---|---|---|---|---|---|---|
| | Enafors station | Handöl 6:4 | none | | | | 21300000016684 |
| | Enafors turisthotell | Handöl 1:34 | 1 | | | 63.28822°N 12.33932°E | 21300000008670 |
| | Engelska villan | Bodsjön 1:2 | 5 | | | 63.44591°N 12.68325°E | 21300000008415 |
| | Går'n på Tossön; Paulsenska huset | Svensta 1:5 | 4 | | | 63.34143°N 13.44956°E | 21300000008893 |
| | Huså herrgård | Huså 1:165 | 1 | | | 63.49109°N 13.12452°E | 21300000008923 |
| | Härbre; Kornlador i Mällbyn | Mällbyn 1:27 previously Mällbyn 1:3 | 3 | | | 63.30485°N 13.88739°E | 21300000008919 |
| | Kornlada | Mällbyn 2:3 | 1 | | | 63.30294°N 13.88464°E | 21300000008917 |
| | Låsböle ordenshus | Låsböle 2:8 | 2 | | | 63.13974°N 14.18889°E | 21300000008898 |
| | Läkarvillan | Mörviken 2:24, 2:26 | 2 | | | 63.40218°N 13.08542°E | 21300000009222 |
| | Medstugan | Medstugan 1:2 | 27 | | | 63.51991°N 12.40885°E | 21300000009012 |
| | Monäset | Gåje 3:17 | 7 | | | 63.19950°N 14.11797°E | 21300000009166 |
| | Månsgården | Månsåsen 1:26 previously Månsåsen 1:13 | 10 | | | 63.06290°N 14.33215°E | 21300000008922 |
| | Mårtenvillan (Hjälpprästens bostad i Totten) | Totten 2:47 previously Totten 2:8 | 2 | | | 63.40013°N 13.08369°E | 21300000009940 |
| | Norrgård | Norrgård 1:2 | 4 | | | 63.30361°N 13.87111°E | 21300000008915 |
| | Olandervillan i Vålådalen | Vallbo 1:17 | 1 | | | 63.14912°N 12.96752°E | 21000001631841 |
| | Rensjösätern | Gråssjölien 1:2 previously Gråssjölien 1:1 | 9 | | | 63.41708°N 12.21430°E | 21300000008683 |
| | Storliens station | Storlien 1:3, 1:5, 1:46, 1:47, 1:48, 1:195 | 14 | | | 63.31622°N 12.10003°E | 21300000009457 |
| | Tjärntorpet | Fäviken 1:1 | 9 | | | 63.41304°N 13.27194°E | 21300000009147 |
| | Ubyn | Ubyn 1:2 | 5 | | | 63.30145°N 13.89584°E | 21300000008914 |
| | Västgård | Västgård 1:1 | 1 | | | 63.47341°N 13.22243°E | 21300000008925 |
| | Åre bergbana | Mörviken 1:75, 2:97 | 3 | | | 63.40179°N 13.08181°E | 21000001469500 |
| | Åre station | Mörviken 2.102, 9:1, 9:2 | 7 | | | 63.39927°N 13.07562°E | 21300000010309 |

== Östersund Municipality ==
| Image | Name | Premise | Number of buildings | Year built | Architect | Coordinates | ID |
|---|---|---|---|---|---|---|---|
| | A 4, Norrlands artilleriregemente | Artilleristen 1 | 14 | | | 63.17626°N 14.64829°E | 21300000009191 |
| | Brunflo station med stationshus Ställverk | Brunflo-Änge 1:53 | 4 | | | 63.07590°N 14.83313°E | 21300000009266 |
| | Böröns kyrkbåthus | Börön 1:2, 8:2 | 1 | | | 62.95420°N 14.90880°E | 21300000009779 |
| | Collegiebostaden | Stocke 1:12 | 1 | | | 63.18599°N 14.50746°E | 21300000009247 |
| | Fjällandets badhus | Fjällandet 1:35 | 1 | | | 63.28376°N 15.24183°E | 21300000015753 |
| | Frösö kyrkskola | Valla 4:1 previously stg 1188 | 1 | | | 63.17827°N 14.52060°E | 21300000009234 |
| | Gamla biblioteket (Ahlbergshallen) | Biblioteket 1 | 1 | | | 63.17803°N 14.63989°E | 21300000009228 |
| | Gamla skolan (Västra skolan) | Contubernium 1 - 4 | 3 | | | 63.17754°N 14.63960°E | 21300000009226 |
| | Gamla Teatern Östersund | Logen 3 | 1 | | | 63.17501°N 14.64063°E | 21300000009224 |
| | Karolinerladan | Singsjölandet 1:8 | 1 | | | 63.09968°N 15.10547°E | 21300000009273 |
| | Lungre boningshus Ryttarhärbre | Lungre 1:2 | 2 | | | 63.22608°N 14.85698°E | 21300000009230 |
| | Lungre smedja Salpeterbod | Lungre 1:10 | 2 | | | 63.22834°N 14.85992°E | 21300000009229 |
| | Länsresidenset Östersund | Landshövdingen 1 | 1 | | | 63.17947°N 14.63284°E | 21300000009278 |
| | Mickelsgård | Valla 8:20 previously stg 1125 | 4 | | | 63.16627°N 14.53114°E | 21300000009249 |
| | Ol-Svens | Börön 4:1 | 18 | | | 62.95281°N 14.91541°E | 21300000009186 |
| | Optands krigsflygfält | Optand 12:1-2; Ope 9:1, 3:5, 1:6, 1:47, 2:12-13, 4:10-11, 10:1, 2:2, 3:12-13, 5:39 | 11 | | | 63.12672°N 14.79582°E | 21000001453020 |
| | Scolarebostaden | Stocke 1:8 | 1 | | | 63.18507°N 14.50530°E | 21300000009248 |
| | Sommarhagen | Valla 6:43 previously stg 1169 | 4 | | | 63.17182°N 14.52187°E | 21300000009246 |
| | Torvalla | Torvalla 3:34, 3:4 previously Torvalla 3:4 | 8 | | | 63.14168°N 14.72957°E | 21300000009269 |
| | Östersunds centralstation | Söder 1:16 | 1 | | | 63.17038°N 14.63805°E | 21300000009276 |
| | Östersunds rådhus | Lagboken 3 | 1 | | | 63.17762°N 14.64147°E | 21300000009172 |
| | Östersunds tennishall | Tennishallen 1 | 1 | | | 63.17975°N 14.65593°E | 21300000009173 |
| | Telehuset (Televerkets hus) Östersund | Postiljonen 6 | 1 | | | 63.17677°N 14.63824°E | 21300000009174 |
