= Pascal Barbot =

French chef

- Born: 7 June 1972 (age 54); Vichy, Allier, France
- Culinary career
- Cooking style: Haute cuisine
- Rating: Michelin stars (former)
- Current restaurant: L'Astrance (Paris)

Pascal Barbot (born 7 June 1972) is a French chef. His restaurant L'Astrance in Paris earned one Michelin star 2023, a year after the reopening of the restaurant at a new location, and has kept the star ever since. Previously L'Astrance had three stars from 2007 to 2018 before being demoted to two stars in 2019. In a 2013 review, food writer Elizabeth Auerbach declared that Barbot "belongs to the small but illustrious group of French chefs who have a truly international profile and are thus the ambassadors of modern French cuisine."

== Career ==
After his graduation from the hotel school of Vichy, Barbot began his cooking career at the Buron de Chaudefour in Chambon-sur-Lac, Puy-de-Dôme. He then went to Clermont-Ferrand and London at the restaurant Saveurs of Joël Antunes. In 1993, he did his national service in the Navy in New Caledonia, where he became the chef to the Pacific admiral.

From 1994 to 1998, he worked with Alain Passard in his restaurant L'Arpège in Paris. In 1996, the restaurant obtained a third star at the Michelin Guide.

After leaving L'Arpège, he travelled to Sydney for a few years before returning to Paris and partnering with Christophe Rohat, another former chef of L'Arpège, to open a new restaurant, L'Astrance. The restaurant obtained its first Michelin star after five months, and its third star in 2007. The 2019 edition of the Michelin guide demoted L'Astrance back to two stars. In 2020, Barbot and Rohat moved the restaurant to a larger building, which happened to be the old location of Jamin, the renowned restaurant by legendary chef Joël Robuchon. The restaurant was also listed for several years among The World's 50 Best Restaurants, including ranking 13th in 2011.

Barbot has trained many chefs, including Jacob Holmström, Magnus Nilsson, Adeline Grattard, Tatiana Levha, Agata Felluga and Manon Fleury.
