= Ultimate Cake Off =

Television series

- Presented by: Michael Schulson; George Duran
- Judges: Margaret Braun; Leigh Grode
- Country of origin: United States
- Original language: English
- No. of seasons: 2
- No. of episodes: 20

Production
- Producers: Sean Atkins, Robin Feinberg
- Running time: 48 minutes

Original release
- Network: TLC
- Release: August 3, 2009 – May 31, 2010

Related
- Cake Boss; Next Great Baker

Ultimate Cake Off is an American television series that aired on TLC. The show is based on professional cake artists that go "head-to-head" in constructing cakes over five feet tall with the assistance of a team of chefs, designers etc. for a money prize. Season one of the series, hosted by Michael Schulson, premiered on August 3, 2009. Season two, hosted by George Duran, premiered on February 1, 2010. Professional bakers Margaret Braun and Leigh Grode join the hosts as judges.

== Gameplay ==
Each competition involves three teams of bakers, in which they have 9 hours to make cakes for a particular client—all of them must meet minimums on height and food content. Each cake is judged for three criteria: client satisfaction, technical difficulty and aesthetic appeal. Each competition also has a taste test, in which four judges (Braun, Grode, the host and the client) taste a sample of the bakers' cakes; the winner of this round has the right to select the team that should sit out for thirty minutes. (Some episodes also feature a skills test, in which each baker decorates a small cake, also for the right to take a team out for thirty minutes). After time runs out, each team moves their cakes to the judging room, where the four judges deliberate on the qualities and faults of each cake. The cake with the most votes wins $10,000, plus display at the client's event.

== Notable contestants ==
Dana Herbert, a baker from Bear, Delaware, participated in a Season 1 competition for Legoland California; he did not win. In 2011, he would become the first champion of TLC's Next Great Baker, in which he would become an intern for Buddy Valastro at Carlo's Bake Shop.

== Episodes ==
=== Series overview ===
The color-coded kitchen set of Ultimate Cake Off

Season	Episodes	Season premiere	Season finale
1	8	August 3, 2009	October 19, 2009
2	12	February 1, 2010	April 26, 2010

=== Season 1 (2009) ===
No. overall	No. in season	Title	Winner	Original release date
1	1	"Shark Summer"	Tariq Hanna	August 3, 2009
Tariq Hanna, Richard Medina, and Ashley Vicos compete to create an aquarium themed cake for the Aquarium of the Pacific's Shark Summer Celebration, and the winner will also walk away with $10,000.
2	2	"Pirates"	Mike Elder	August 31, 2009
Bob Brougham, Susan Carberry, and Mike Elder compete to create a Pirate themed cake over five feet tall for the annual Pirate Invasion Fair in Long Beach.
3	3	"Square Dancing"	Courtney Clark	September 7, 2009
Norman R. Davis, Courtney Clark, and Clemence Gossett compete to create a cake for the 58th National Square Dancing Convention, and the winner will also walk away with $10,000.
4	4	"4th of July"	Pat Jacoby	September 14, 2009
Tariq Hanna, Pat Jacoby, and Carrie Biggers compete to create a cake that will be displayed at Ronald Reagan Presidential Library's Fourth of July Celebration, and the winner will also walk away with $10,000.
5	5	"Automobiles & Fashion"	Martha Hebert	September 28, 2009
Martha Hebert, Leslie Poyourow and Greg Marsh compete to create black and white car themed cakes for the Petersen Automotive Museum's 15th Anniversary celebration.
6	6	"Wedding Celebration"	Norman Davis	October 5, 2009
Norman Davis, Rebecca Sutterby and Mark Randazzo compete to create the wedding cake of every bride's dream.
7	7	"LEGOLAND"	Anne Heap	October 12, 2009
Dana Herbert, Kate Sullivan, and Anne Heap compete to create a Lego themed cake for Legoland California Resort's 10th Anniversary Celebration, and the winner will walk also away with $10,000.
8	8	"Circus Spectacular"	Ashley Vicos	October 19, 2009
Roland Winbeckler, Mary Moy-Hochstetler, and Ashley Vicos compete to create circus themed cakes for Ringling Bros. and Barnum and Bailey's Circus.

=== Season 2 (2010) ===
No. overall	No. in season	Title	Original release date
9	1	"Winter Wedding"	February 1, 2010
Mike Terry, Andrea Carusetta, and Charity George compete to create a bride's winter wonderland dream cake.
10	2	"Top Dogs"	February 8, 2010
Mike Elder, Wayne Steinkopf, and Christine Schnee compete to create an American Kennel Club dog themed cake that will be showcased at the American Kennel Club's prestigious Agility Invitational, and the winner will also walk away with $10,000.
11	3	"The Nutcracker Sweet"	February 15, 2010
John Auburn, Beryl Byrd, and Anna Echols compete to create a cake for Long Beach Ballet's annual performance of The Nutcracker, and whoever is chosen will have the honor of having their cake presented onstage and will win a $10,000 prize.
12	4	"Really Sweet 16"	February 22, 2010
Kathy Scott, Bob Brougham, and Beth Ayala compete to create a riverboat themed sweet 16 cake for a young girl's sweet 16 birthday party on the Scarlett Belle riverboat. Whoever makes the ultimate cake will also win $10,000.
13	5	"Griffith Observatory"	March 1, 2010
Colette Peters competes against previous champions Norman Davis and Anne Heap to make a cake for Griffith Observatory's 75th Anniversary.
14	6	"Vintage Hollywood Wedding"	March 8, 2010
Master Cake builders Jan Kish and Sharon Zambito take on returning champion Pat Jacoby to make a Hollywood themed wedding cake and to win $10,000.
15	7	"Monster Mash"	March 15, 2010
Returning champion Ashley Vicos takes on newcomers Christy Vega-Gluch and Mark Atwood to make a cake for Monster Jam and to win the $10,000 prize.
16	8	"Fairy Tale Wedding"	March 22, 2010
Martha Herbert a returning champ takes on newcomer Amelia Carbine and master cake artist Julie Bashore to win $10,000 and to have their cake chosen to be in a fairy tale themed wedding.
17	9	"Roller Derby!"	April 5, 2010
Three master cake artists compete against each for $10,000 and to have their cake featured at the opening to a Roller derby season opening event.
18	10	"Honoring the Bravest"	April 12, 2010
Three cake artists compete to make a cake that pays tribute to the Los Angeles Fire Department for their ceremony.
19	11	"Swimwear Fashion Show"	April 19, 2010
Returning champions Mike Elder, Ashley Vicos and Norman Davis compete against each to make a cake for a swimwear fashion show.
20	12	"Black-Tie Wedding"	April 26, 2010
Three newcomers compete each other to make a cake for a black-tie wedding.

=== Special (2010) ===
Title	Original release date
"Cake Boss: Ultimate Cake Boss"	May 31, 2010
In this special episode of Cake Boss, Buddy Valastro decides which of his brothers-in-law makes the best cake for the 100th anniversary of Carlo's Bakery. This is the first time that Cake Boss has done a crossover with Ultimate Cake Off.
