= Crash the Super Bowl =

Annual Online Commercial Competition

2009 Crash the Super Bowl Logo

The Crash the Super Bowl contest is an online commercial competition run by Frito-Lay. Consumers are invited to create their own Doritos ads and each year, at least one fan-made commercial is guaranteed to air during the Super Bowl. In later editions of the contest, Doritos offered bonus prizes ranging from $400,000 to $1,000,000. Eight editions of the Crash the Super Bowl commercial contest were held between 2006 and 2016 and, during that time, fans submitted more than 36,000 entries. The contest was revived in 2024.

== 2006–2007 contest ==
In the fall of 2006, Frito-Lay (with the help of their ad agency, Goodby, Silverstein & Partners, and led by their promotional agency, The Marketing Arm) launched the first installment of the Crash the Super Bowl contest. Consumers were tasked with creating 30 second commercials for Doritos products. In all, 1,065 consumer-made ads were submitted and displayed on the contest site, Crashthesuperbowl.com. From those entries, five ads were selected as finalists. The director of each selected ad received a cash prize of $10,000 and a trip for two to Detroit during Super Bowl XLI in February 2007. The five finalist ads were posted to the contest web site for a month-long public vote. The commercial that received the most votes, "Live the Flavor" aired during the 2007 Super Bowl. Though the five 2006–2007 finalists were flown to Detroit, they did not actually attend the Super Bowl. Instead, they watched the game from a private party near the stadium. In a move that has since become a Crash the Super Bowl tradition, no one, not even the finalists, knew which commercials would air before the game. "Live the Flavor" was the first consumer-generated ad to ever air during the Super Bowl and it was ranked the #4 best commercial of the game on the USA Today Ad Meter poll. Later in the game, Frito-Lay surprised the finalists by also airing a second Crash the Super Bowl ad, "Check Out Girl."

In December 2007, Time.com named "Live the Flavor" the 9th best commercial of the year. Frito-Lay's PR company, Ketchum Inc., won a Golden World Award from the International Public Relations Association for their work on the 2006–2007 Crash the Super Bowl contest. According to the IPRA, the competition led to a 12% increase in sales of Doritos in January, 2007 and nearly one million people visited the Crash The Super Bowl website to view the submissions and vote for the finalists. In the months following the Super Bowl, Frito-Lay chose to air all five commercials that had made the Crash the Super Bowl finals.

== 2007–2008 contest ==
In the Fall of 2007, Frito-Lay announced that they would once again run the Crash the Super Bowl contest. But instead of being a commercial contest, the 2007–2008 installment would give an aspiring musician the chance to "Crash" the Super Bowl and have their music heard by millions of viewers. The winner would also receive a record deal with Interscope Geffen A&M Records. The winner of the public vote was 22-year-old Kina Grannis and, during Super Bowl XLII, Frito-Lay purchased 60 seconds of commercial time to run a music video featuring Grannis performing part of her original song, "Message From Your Heart." Frito-Lay also chose to air one of the 2006–2007 Crash the Super Bowl finalist ads, "Mouse Trap", during the game.

Grannis' performance was seen by 100 million viewers and her song, "Message From Your Heart" briefly made the Top 30 on iTunes. However, Grannis' music video/commercial landed at the very bottom of USA Today's Super Bowl ad meter poll. The 2007 Crash the Super Bowl commercial that Doritos decided to air managed to rank #4 on the ad meter that year.

== 2008–2009 contest ==
Frito-Lay brought the commercial contest back in the fall of 2008 and challenged filmmakers to create the best commercial of Super Bowl XLIII. If a consumer-made Doritos commercial could score the #1 spot on the official USA Today Ad meter poll, Frito-Lay would pay the ad's creator a one million dollar bonus. 1,961 entries were submitted in the fall of 2008 and five finalists spots were selected in early January. Each finalist received a prize of $25,000 and a trip for two to the Super Bowl. The finalists watched the game from a private box in the stadium. The ad that won the public vote was "Free Doritos" by Joe and Dave Herbert of Batesville, IN. "Free Doritos" did score the #1 spot on the 2009 Ad Meter poll and the Herbert brothers won the million dollar bonus. Frito-Lay also decided to air a bonus Crash the Super Bowl ad, "The Power of the Crunch", later in the game.

== 2009–2010 contest ==
The third installment of the Crash the Super Bowl commercial contest was launched in the fall of 2009. In this version of the contest, fans were encouraged to "Take the Top 3" spots on the USA Today Ad meter poll. Bonus prizes of $1,000,000, $600,000 and $400,000 were offered if a filmmakers scored the number one, two or three spot on the poll. If three Crash the Super Bowl commercials swept the top three spots on the ad meter, each team would receive an additional bonus of one million dollars.

Six consumer-made ads were selected for the finals and each finalist received a prize of $25,000 plus a trip for two to the Super Bowl. Frito-Lay ultimately decided to air 4 of the 6 finalist commercials during Super Bowl XLIV. The Crash the Super Bowl spot, "UnderDog", was ranked the second best commercial on the USA Today ad Meter so the team that made that entry won a bonus of $600,000. Also of note in the 2009-2010 contest was the spot entitled "Snack Attack Samurai". Although ranking only 17th on the USA Today Ad Meter, it earned distinction as "the most viewed ad of all time" according to Nielsen ratings It held this record for one year until it was usurped by another Super Bowl ad.

== 2010–2011 contest ==
On September 15, 2010, Frito-Lay announced that Pepsi Max was joining Doritos for the 2010–2011 installment of the annual contest. Consumers could submit 30 second commercials for either product. Judges selected five Pepsi Max finalists and five Doritos finalists. Three commercials for each product then aired during the 2011 Super Bowl. The Doritos' commercial "Pug Attack" tied for first place on the USA Today Ad Meter poll and its creator received a one million dollar bonus from Frito-Lay. The Doritos Super Bowl ad "House Sitting" came in third on the Ad Meter poll and the creator of that spot won a bonus of $400,000.

== 2011–2012 contest ==
Frito-Lay received more than 6,100 submissions for the 2012 Crash the Super Bowl contest Two fan-made commercials won million dollar bonuses, "Man's Best Friend" and "Sling Baby." "Man's Best Friend" was ranked the number one ad of the game in the USA Today Ad Meter poll. Frito-Lay also offered a million dollar bonus to any Crash the Super Bowl ad that could win a second poll that was run by Facebook. Facebook voters ranked "Sling Baby" the best commercial of the game and the Sling Baby team won the bonus money.

== 2012–2013 contest ==
On September 18, 2012, Frito-Lay announced the 6th installment of the Crash the Super Bowl commercial contest. In addition to the regular prizes, the director of the commercial that scored the highest on the USA Today ad meter would win a job working with director Michael Bay on Transformers: Age of Extinction. On January 3, 2013, Doritos announced their list of the Top 5 finalists: "Goat 4 Sale" by Ben Callner of Atlanta, GA; "Road Chip" by Tyler Dixon of Los Angeles, CA; "Fashionista Daddy" by Mark Freiburger of Los Angeles, CA; "Express Checkout" by Sasha Shemirani of San Diego, CA; and "Fetch" by Joe Taranto of Los Angeles, CA. For the first time ever, the entire Crash the Super Bowl contest was moved from Crashthesuperbowl.com and run on Facebook as a contest app. According to Frito-Lay, more than 3,500 entries were submitted in the fall of 2012. "Fashionista Daddy" and "Goat 4 Sale" both aired during the Super Bowl but neither ad was ranked the #1, #2, or #3 commercial of the game on the USA Today's public ad meter. "Fashionista Daddy" ranked the highest, so its director, Mark Freiburger, was the winner of the Transformers 4 job.

== 2013–2014 contest ==
In 2013, Frito-Lay announced that, for the first time, the Crash the Super Bowl contest would be accepting international entries. Anyone who lived in a country where Doritos are sold could participate. Instead of awarding bonus prizes, Frito-Lay promised to air the commercial that won an online vote and pay the creator a one million dollar grand prize.

The 2014 finalists were “Time Machine” by Ryan Andersen of Scottsdale, Arizona; “Office Thief” by Chris Capel of Valencia, California; “The Cowboy Kid” by Amber Gill of Ladera Ranch, California; “Breakroom Ostrich” by Eric Haviv of Atlanta, Georgia; and “Finger Cleaner” by Thomas Noakes of Sydney, Australia.

"Office Thief" starred Deadwood actor Larry Cedar and Steve Olson.

The two fan-made ads that aired during the 2014 Super Bowl were "The Cowboy Kid" and "Time Machine." The next day, Frito-Lay announced that "Time Machine" had received the most votes during the Pre-Super Bowl voting which meant that "Time Machine" was the contest's grand prize winner.

== 2014–2015 contest ==
In early September 2014, Frito-Lay announced the return of the Crash the Super Bowl contest. In the 2014-2015 installment, judges would pick 10 finalists and one grand prize winner would win one million dollars and a year-long "dream job" working for Universal Studios.

According to Frito-Lay, almost 4,900 entries were submitted to the 2014-2015 installment of the Crash the Super Bowl contest. The finalists selected by the judges were “Doritos Angler” by James Bedford (UK); “Baby's First Word” by Travis Braun (USA); “Selfish Sneezers” by Devon Ferguson (Canada); “The Lemonade Stand” by David Horowitz (USA); “Trouble in the Back Seat” by Jason Johnson (USA); “Mis-Spelling Bee” by Brian Kleinschmidt (USA); “What Could Go Wrong?” by Alex Pepper (USA); “Doritos Manchild” by Armand de Saint-Salvy (Australia); “When Pigs Fly” by Graham Talbot (Canada); and “Middle Seat” by Scott Zabielski (USA).

The winner was "Middle Seat" by Scott Zabielski.

== 2015–2016 contest ==
On September 9, 2015, Frito-Lay announced that the 2016 Crash the Super Bowl contest would be the final edition of the contest. As this was the final Crash The Super Bowl competition, the judges chose two commercials to be aired. The grand prize winner was "Doritos Dogs" by Jacob Chase.

== 2024–2025 contest ==
Doritos revived the contest for the 2025 Super Bowl.
