= École Supérieure de Cuisine Française - Ferrandi =

École Supérieure de Cuisine Française (ESCF - Higher School of French Cuisine at Ferrandi) is a professional training school located in central Paris. Established by The Paris Chamber of Commerce and Industry (CCIP), the school is part of École Grégoire-Ferrandi and specializes in training students for work in hospitality management and French cuisine.

In 2005 the school founded Atelier Pierre Hermé, a workshop class focusing on techniques and creations of French pastry chef Pierre Hermé.

== History ==
The Ferrandi School, as it was originally named, was founded by the Paris Chamber of Commerce and Industry in 1932 as the organization's first "Atelier École" to offer professional training in the food services. In 1983 the school established the École Supérieure de Cuisine Française program. In 1997 the Ferrandi School and another CCIP school called the Grégoire School, which specializes in craftsmanship and interior design, were incorporated to form École Grégoire Ferrandi.

== Notable alumni ==
- Joël Cesari - Michelin starred chef at La Chaumière
- George Duran - Television personality, host of "Ultimate Cake Off"
- Didier Elena - Two Michelin starred chef at Les Crayères, Essex House
- Adeline Grattard - Michelin starred chef/owner of Yam'Tcha
- Jacques Lameloise (fr) - Knight of the Legion of Honor and chef/owner of Lameloise, holds three Michelin stars
- William Ledeuil - Chef at Ze Kitchen Galerie, holds one Michelin star.
- Lachlan MacKinnon Patterson - 2008 James Beard award winner, celebrity competitor on Top Chef:Masters
- Claire Saffitz - Contributing Food Editor at Bon Appétit Magazine, star of popular series "Gourmet Makes" on the Bon Appétit YouTube channel
- Matthieu Viannay (fr) - Two Michelin starred chef at La Mère Brazier
