= Tariq Hanna =

Chef

- Culinary career
- Cooking style: pastry
- Previous restaurant(s): Sucré The Northville Gourmet

Tariq Hanna was Executive Pastry Chef and partner of the Sucré dessert restaurant in New Orleans, Louisiana.

== Biography ==
He was born and raised in Nigeria, and after attending boarding school in England, Hanna moved to the United States to attend Lawrence Technological University in Detroit, Michigan. Hanna enrolled himself in culinary school at Oakland Community College. His first job in the restaurant industry was working the sandwich board at a deli in Southfield, Michigan named Sol's Deli. While searching for jobs in hot food, Hanna dabbled in pastries on the side.

In 1993, Hanna opened his own family-operated pastry and catering shop, The Northville Gourmet, at the age of 24. After six years of self-employment, Hanna was offered a position as the first casino pastry chef in Detroit. In December 1999, MotorCity Casino opened in Detroit. It was here that Hanna immersed himself in pastry, from taking and teaching classes to performing in competitions on a local and national level.

During his tenure at MotorCity, Hanna participated in several cooking competitions on the Food Network, including the National Bread and Pastry Championship, Chocolate Fantasy Competition, Cereal Bridges and Gingerbread Mansions Competition. In 2004, he was named the first Central Region Pastry Chef of the Year, and Runner-up National Pastry Chef of the Year by the American Culinary Federation.

After seven years at MotorCity Casino, Hanna joined with New Orleans native restaurateur Joel Dondis to develop Dondis' vision of the Sucré restaurant. Hanna was named Pastry Chef of the Year in 2007 by New Orleans Magazine. Hanna was also a finalist for Chef Magazine's 2008 Chef of the Year, and was named best pastry chef in both the 2008 and 2009 New Orleans City Business Culinary Connoisseurs issues.

He also competed on TLC's Ultimate Cake Off episode 1 ("Shark Summer") and episode 4 ("Fourth of July"); and the Food Network Challenge ("Incredible Edible Mansions").

In 2018, Hanna sold his shares of Sucré and left the company after sexual misconduct allegations. Sucré closed suddenly on June 17, 2019.
