= Adeline Grattard =

French chef

- Born: 8 February 1978 (age 48); Dijon, France
- Education: École Supérieure de Cuisine Française (ESCF) - Ferrandi
- Spouse: Chi Wah Chan
- Culinary career
- Cooking style: French; Cantonese; Fusion
- Rating(s): Michelin Star, Yam'Tcha
- Current restaurant: Yam'Tcha
- Previous restaurant: L'Astrance

Adeline Grattard is the head chef of the Michelin-starred restaurant Yam'Tcha in Paris.

Grattard was born on 8 February 1978 in Dijon, France. She was trained at the School of French Cuisine at Ferrandi and worked under Pascal Barbot at L'Astrance.

Grattard's husband, Chi Wah Chan, was born in Hong Kong, and they moved from Paris to Hong Kong for two years, where Grattard worked alongside Chinese chefs and explored the culinary scene. They returned to Paris and together opened Yam'Tcha in the Les Halles neighborhood in 2009. The name Yam'Tcha is a reference to the Cantonese phrase "Yum cha" for eating a meal with tea, and tea service by Chan is part of the prix fixe meal at the restaurant. Yam'Tcha received many positive reviews in its first year and was awarded one star in the 2010 Michelin Guide.

Grattard was featured on an episode of the Netflix series Chef's Table: France in 2016.
