= Sucré =

Dessert boutique in New Orleans, Louisiana

Sucré (also known as Sucré Dessert Boutique) is a dessert boutique based in New Orleans, Louisiana, and was founded in April 2007 by Joel Dondis.

== Naming ==
Sucré is the French word for "sugared". The bakery was formerly known as "Dessert Boutique" or "A Sweet Boutique". Boutique is the French word for "shop". In English, the term boutique typically refers to fashion-oriented stores.

== Location ==
The original Sucré store can be found on Magazine Street in the Garden District of New Orleans. They also distribute their products throughout the United States via their website, which serves as an online storefront for their stores.

== History ==
Sucré was originally owned by Joel Dondis, a New Orleans restaurateur and former sous-chef for Emeril Lagasse. Dondis and pastry chef Tariq Hanna co-founded the shop.

Sucré, New Orleans' first dessert-only restaurant, opened in 2007. Sucré served plated desserts with custom garnishes, as well as confections including flavor-infused marshmallows, artisan chocolate bars, candied almonds, sipping chocolates, and freshly spun gelato and sundaes.

Hanna sold his Sucré shares and left the firm in 2018, formally stepping down as a consequence of sexual harassment claims. Joel Dondis took over as sole proprietor of Sucré Dessert Boutique. Sucré was closed on June 17, 2019, due to a bankruptcy and liquidation filing.

Employees learned of the news when Joel Dondis summoned them to a parking lot and informed them that they no longer had a job. They were given the responsibility of disposing of the sweets.

The business, now under new ownership by Ayesha Motwani, reopened in 2020 with a predominantly female team at its original location.
