= École Grégoire-Ferrandi =

Professional training school in Paris

Coordinates: 48°50′51″N 2°19′32″E

École Grégoire-Ferrandi is one of France's leading professional training schools located in the 6th arrondissement of Paris in a 25000 sq. m. site. Its culinary school is called École Supérieure de Cuisine Française (ESCF).

== Areas of training ==
The school offers three areas of training and specializations within each area:

- culinary arts: cooking and service, catering, bakery and pastry
- restaurant management
- craftsmanship and interior design

There are 1500 students and 2000 professionals in continuous education with a success rate of over 90% for job placement six months after graduation.

== History ==
- 1932: The Paris Chamber of Commerce and Industry established the first "Atelier Ecole" offering professional training in foodservice. Over the next fifty years, the training program grew steadily and the Ferrandi School earned a reputation for excellence.
- 1950: The leather program of the Paris Chamber of Commerce located to Rue de l'Abbé Grégoire, in the heart of Paris's famous Latin Quarter.
- 1958: The Ferrandi School also moved to the Latin quarter, next to the Grégoire School.
- 1983: The Ferrandi School created the Ecole Supérieure de Cuisine Française program to provide the highest level of culinary training and associated management skills in France.
- 1997: The Grégoire and the Ferrandi schools merged to form L'Ecole Grégoire-Ferrandi.

== Notable alumni ==
- Claire Saffitz, from Ecole Supérieure de Cuisine Française
- Eunji Lee, named North America's Best Pastry Chef
