= Ketchum Inc. =

American public relations firm

- Type: Subsidiary
- Industry: Public relations and advertising
- Founded: 1923; 103 years ago Pittsburgh, Pennsylvania, U.S.
- Founder: George Ketchum
- Headquarters: New York City, U.S.
- Key people: Tamara Norman (US CEO) Jo-ann Robertson (CEO of Global Markets) Mike Doyle (former president and CEO)
- Parent: Omnicom Group
- Website: ketchum.com

Ketchum Inc. is a global public relations firm, offering marketing, branding, and corporate communications services in the corporate, healthcare, food and beverage, and technology industries. George Ketchum founded the firm as a Pittsburgh-based advertising company in 1923. It later evolved to include a public relations practice. The firm is headquartered in New York City, with auxiliary offices and affiliates in North America, EMEA, Asia Pacific, and Latin America. The agency has been owned by Omnicom Group since 1996.

On February 10, 2026, Omnicom Public Relations Group announced that Ketchum and Golin would merge to form Golin Ketchum, a combined global brand communications agency. Matt Neale, formerly Global CEO of Golin, was named CEO of the combined entity; Tamara Norman, formerly Ketchum U.S. CEO, was named Global President. Both legacy brand identities are retained during the 2026 integration phase.

== History ==
The agency that would become Ketchum was founded as Ketchum and MacLeod in Pittsburgh on May 22, 1923. The agency's name was changed to Ketchum, MacLeod & Grove in 1924. It was led by brothers George and Carlton Ketchum, and Norman McLeod and Robert Grove, whom the brothers met at University of Pittsburgh in the 1910s. The agency's early work focused on advertising, publicity, and fundraising.

In 1934 the agency established a public relations department. The department's first assignment was a campaign for Natural Gas Companies, People's Natural Gas, and other local natural gas companies. The agency received national attention in 1951 when it orchestrated a sponsorship for client Westinghouse of the first nationally televised NCAA football game. As the firm's billings grew in the late 1950s, it opened offices in New York City and Washington, D.C. It acquired west coast-based agency Botsford Constantine & McCarty, forming Botsford-Ketchum in 1969.

George Ketchum died in September 1975. The agency changed its name to Ketchum Communications Inc. in 1981. Its major divisions became known as Ketchum Advertising, Ketchum Public Relations, and Ketchum Directory Advertising. Ketchum Public Relations moved its headquarters to New York from Pittsburgh in 1982.

The agency won its first global account (with FedEx) and its first pan-European account (with Whirlpool) in 1994. In 1996, Ketchum handled the Torch relay for the Atlanta Olympics.

In 2016, Ketchum created "Cultivate", a new branch to help companies and organizations in organic food markets.

In November 2017, Ketchum announced that then Partner and President Barri Rafferty would assume the role of president and chief executive officer, effective January 1, 2018. Rafferty is the first woman to lead a top five global public relations firm.

== Mergers and acquisitions ==
Omnicom Group acquired Ketchum in 1996. At the time, Ketchum was the 25th-largest American agency. In 1998, Ketchum merged with British consumer agency Life PR. Ketchum sold Ketchum Advertising in 1999; the "Ketchum" name has referred solely to the PR practice since that time.

In the 2000s, Ketchum acquired several firms and opened others, including the acquisition of New York management consulting firm Stromberg Consulting in 2001, the launching of influencer marketing and community building firm Emanate in 2006, and the acquisitions of clinical trial patient recruitment agency MMG in 2008, Moscow-based Maslov PR in 2010, Indian agency Sampark PR in 2011, Capstrat in North Carolina in 2012, and German lifestyle and social media PR agency Brandzeichen in 2013. Ketchum took a majority stake in Newscan's China operations in 2011, expanded Ketchum Sports & Entertainment practice into Brazil in 2012, and acquired ICON International Communications in Singapore in 2013. In the US, Ketchum partnered with luxury and lifestyle agency Harrison & Shriftman in 2011, and launched music marketing service Ketchum Sounds in 2012.

Ketchum merged with Düsseldorf-based Pleon in one of the industry's largest mergers in 2009, and later merged with South Korea-based firm InComm Brodeur in 2013.

In February 2026, Omnicom Public Relations announced a restructuring of its portfolio, and as part of the changes, Ketchum and Golin, an agency owned by Interpublic Group (IPG), merged to form a combined global brand communications agency. The restructuring also included the integration of Porter Novelli into FleishmanHillard. According to Omnicom Public Relations, the changes were designed to create a more integrated communications organization while maintaining continuity for existing clients.

== Major work ==
Ketchum's major clients include MasterCard, Chase, IBM, IKEA, Philips, and Pfizer.

In 1985, Ketchum launched the Acura line of cars for American Honda Motor Company. Ketchum also worked on the rebranding of Orville Redenbacher's popcorn in the 1990s to appeal to a younger demographic, developed Doritos' 2006 crowdsourced "Crash the Super Bowl" contest, which won a Golden World Award from the International Public Relations Association, and created a campaign for Delta Air Lines during US Airways' 2008 bid to take over the airline after it had filed Chapter 11 bankruptcy. US Airways later dropped the bid and the campaign won a Silver Anvil. The agency has also worked with Kodak in 2010, the Committee to Preserve Olympic Wrestling (CPOW)'s campaign to keep wrestling in the Olympic program, and Wendy's on the launch of the Pretzel Bacon Cheeseburger in 2013, for which they were nominated as a 2014 Shorty Award finalist.

In 2011, Ketchum faced backlash for a promotion for ConAgra, in which the agency hosted a dinner for food bloggers that was billed as serving food prepared by George Duran, but diners were served ConAgra frozen foods instead. Ketchum filmed each dinner and hoped to use footage of diners' reactions for promotional purposes. However, many bloggers felt tricked by the switch. Ketchum apologized and ConAgra offered reimbursement for any incurred expense to the attendees.

=== Crisis management ===
Ketchum has a team of approximately 50 crisis management executives in the US and offers a suite of related services, including Mobile RepProtect, University RepProtect for higher education, Cyber RepProtect for data security, and Game Plan for sports teams and brands.

In 2011, Pennsylvania State University hired Ketchum to handle crisis communications following the Jerry Sandusky scandal in 2011. Ketchum worked with Malaysia Airlines during the search for and response to missing plane MH370 in 2014. The agency also provided crisis counseling to Anthem Blue Cross Blue Shield in 2015 during the largest data breach in the US insurance industry's history.

=== American government work ===
Ketchum has fulfilled multiple contracts for the United States government, including for the Department of Education, Department of Health & Human Services, the Internal Revenue Service, and the US Army. In 2015 the agency worked with the Library of Congress to provide support for the National Book Festival. In 2004, Ketchum was accused of "covert propaganda" for a series of news stories for HHS that used actors playing journalists reporting on drug benefits without informing viewers of the government connection, for which it was found to be in violation of a federal propaganda ban by the Government Accountability Office. In 2005, the Ketchum received similarly critical coverage after the Education Department directed the agency to pay for coverage that praised President Bush's No Child Left Behind Act. The final investigation by the FCC did not find Ketchum to be at fault, but it did issue a citation for Armstrong Williams, who was paid by Ketchum to promote the NCLB Act, and fined two broadcasting companies.

=== Russian government work ===
In 2006, Dmitry Peskov, Vladimir Putin's press attaché, hired Ketchum to work on the 32nd G8 summit held in Saint Petersburg, to improve Russia's reputation in the West after its state-controlled energy company Gazprom cut off natural gas supplies to Ukraine.

From 2006 to 2015, Ketchum represented the Russian Federation in the US and Europe for events including the G20 Summit, World Economic Forum, and 2014 Sochi Olympics, media and op-ed outreach. In 2013, Ketchum pitched an op-ed from Russian president Vladimir Putin on the Syrian Civil War to The New York Times. According to The Holmes Report, the assignment "attracted plenty of mainstream media scrutiny in the US, most of it negative" due to the countries' political relationship. In January 2015, Politico magazine reported that Ketchum had received more than $60 million from the Kremlin for their work from 2006 to 2014. The contract between the Russian and Ketchum ended in March 2015.

=== Awards ===
In 1985 Ketchum New York was a finalist in the Caples direct marketing awards for their pro bono work assisting Central Park and the Central Park Conservancy. As of 2016, Ketchum has won more Silver Anvils from the Public Relations Society of America than any other agency. Its campaigns have been awarded "Campaign of the Year" by PRWeek five times, and Ketchum was the 2002 and 2012 PRWeek Agency of the Year. Ketchum London was named Agency of the Decade by U.K.’s CorpComms magazine in 2015.

== Corporate overview ==
Ketchum is owned by Omnicom Group and is part of the company's Diversified Agency Services network's Omnicom Public Relations Group. The agency's subsidiaries include Access Brand Communications, Emanate, and Capstrat.

=== Locations and employees ===
Ketchum's headquarters are located in New York City. The agency has more than 130 offices and affiliates in over 70 countries. As of 2016, Ketchum has approximately 2,500 employees.

In 2016, Ketchum announced the formation of a global leadership council comprising 20 senior leaders. The GLC replaced and significantly expanded Ketchum's Executive Committee.

Ketchum was led by President and CEO Mike Doyle for 30 years, ending in 2025.

Other leadership roles include President of North America and U.S. CEO Tamara Norman, CEO of global markets Jo-ann Robertson, and Global Chief Financial & Operating Officer Alan Banner.

=== Company culture ===
Ketchum developed a program called MindFire for college students to respond to client challenges with creative solutions in order to earn prizes and networking opportunities.
