= Ham on the Street =

- Starring: George Duran
- Narrated by: George Duran
- Country of origin: United States
- Original language: English
- No. of episodes: 26

Production
- Running time: 30 minutes

Original release
- Network: Food Network
- Release: January 11 – November 15, 2006

Ham on the Street was a cooking show hosted by George Duran on the Food Network in 2006. George adds comedy to cooking as he explores each show's topic in the strangest possible ways. For example, during the show on breakfast, George tested to see if an ostrich egg could be cooked sunny-side up. He rarely is on a set, and he does most of the show on the streets of Norwalk, Connecticut, New York City, and Miami Beach, Florida, as well as in diners, restaurants and malls.
