= Michael Schulson =

American celebrity chef and restaurateur

- Education: Culinary Institute of America
- Culinary career
- Current restaurants: Monkitail; Pearl & Mary; Harp & Crown; Double Knot; Independence Beer Garden; Sampan; Graffiti Bar; Izakaya; Osteria; Giuseppe & Sons; Bar Lesieur
- Television show(s): Ultimate Cake Off, The Today Show, The Martha Stewart Show, Live with Regis and Kelly, The View (talk show), Rachael Ray (talk show), and The Tyra Banks Show.
- Website: https://michaelschulson.com/

Michael Schulson is an American celebrity chef and restaurateur. He has founded the Schulson Collective of restaurants involving Japanese gastropub Izakaya, the Double Knot Restaurant, the Graffiti Bar, the Independence Beer Garden, Sampan, Harp & Crown, Giuseppe & Sons and other prominent restaurants.

== Early career and education ==
Schulson graduated from the Culinary Institute of America. He later worked as chef in several restaurants including the New York's Peacock Alley (restaurant), Park Avenue Café, Le Bec-Fin, and Susanna Foo.

== Career ==
In 2008, Schulson opened his first restaurant named Izakaya (a "Japanese pub" in Atlantic City's Borgata Hotel Casino & Spa). In 2009, Schulson opened a second restaurant named Sampan (a contemporary Asian restaurant and bar). Sampan was subsequently named one of Bon Appetit's "Top Six places to Taste Asian Fusion," and Schulson was named one of Esquire's "Chefs to Watch". In the same year he founded Graffiti Bar.

In 2014, Schulson founded the Independence Beer Garden, a 20,000 square-foot open-air drinking and dining establishment. Schulson later opened the Harp & Crown restaurant located in Philadelphia's Rittenhouse Square. The Harp & Crown was named one of the "most beautiful restaurants of 2016" by Eater National.

In 2016, Schulson founded the Double Knot restaurant in Philadelphia. The restaurant received numerous awards including "three bells" from The Philadelphia Inquirer, three stars and the title of "2016 Best New Restaurant" from Philadelphia magazine and was named one of the "15 biggest restaurant openings of 2016" by Zagat.

In 2017, Schulson founded the restaurant Monkitail in Hollywood. Schulson also currently serves as chef-partner at Izakaya at Borgata in Atlantic City. He also operates the airport dining concepts Sky Asian Bistro (in Philadelphia International) and Deep Blue (at JFK International).

== Television ==
Michael Schulson starred in two Television series, TLC's Ultimate Cake Off and Style Network’s Pantry Raid. He has also appeared as a guest on The Today Show, Bobby Flay, The Martha Stewart Show, Live with Regis and Kelly, The View (talk show), Rachael Ray (talk show), and The Tyra Banks Show.

== See also ==
- Ultimate Cake Off
