= Fäviken =

Restaurant located in Järpen, Sweden

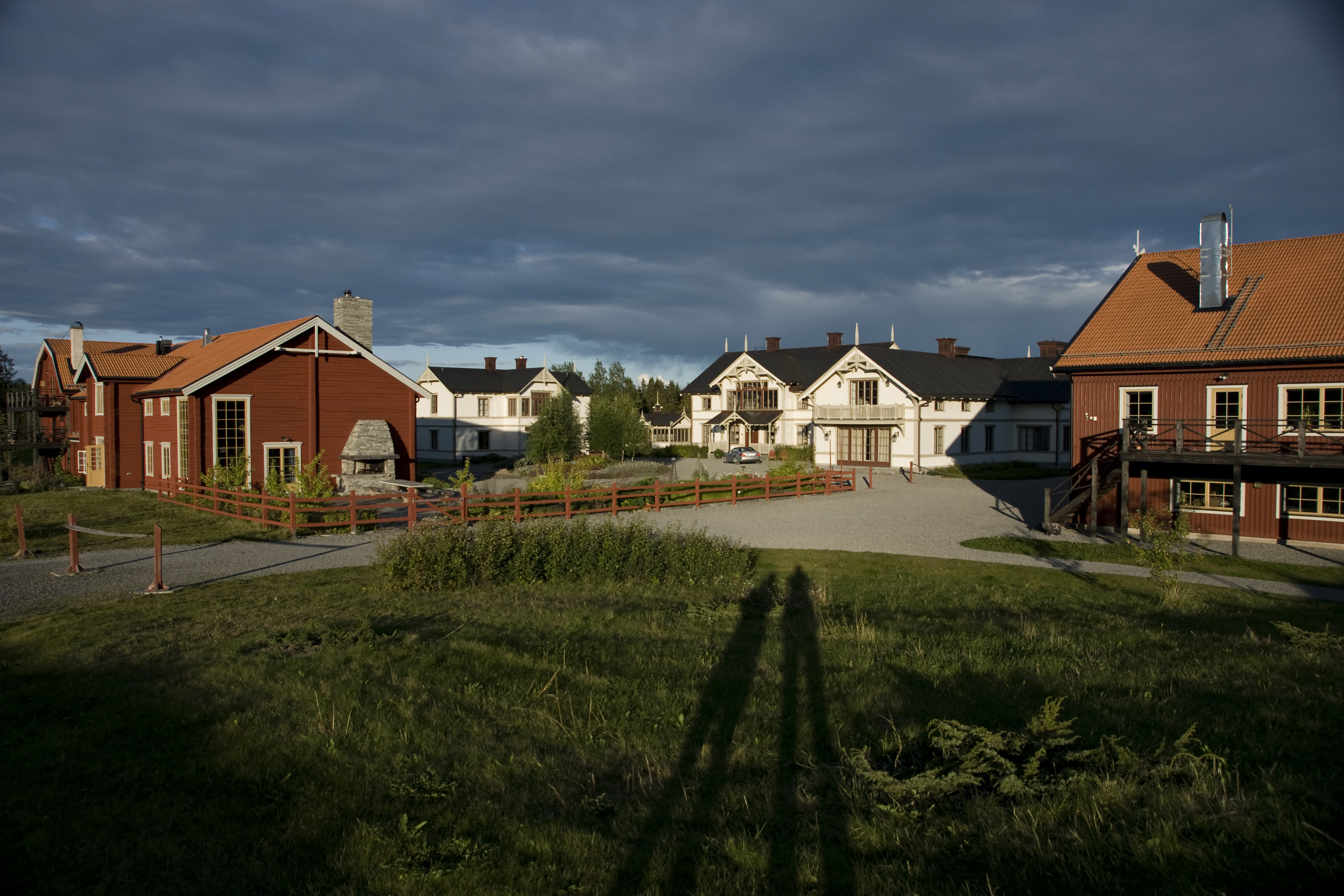
- The exterior of the Fäviken estate

- Fäviken's location in Sweden

Restaurant information
- Head chef: Magnus Nilsson
- Food type: New Nordic
- Location: Fäviken Egendom, Järpen, 83005, Sweden
- Coordinates: 63.435256°N 13.293039°E
- Seating capacity: 24
- Website: www.faviken.com

Fäviken was a restaurant located in Åre Municipality, Jämtland, Sweden. It was run by chef Magnus Nilsson between 2008 and 2019. The food served at the restaurant was localised to the estates around the restaurant, with only a handful of exceptions. Fäviken was placed in The World's 50 Best Restaurants in 2012, and named as one of the top ten restaurants in the world by the Zagat guide in 2013. The restaurant closed December 14, 2019, because Nilsson wanted to move on to other projects.

== Description ==
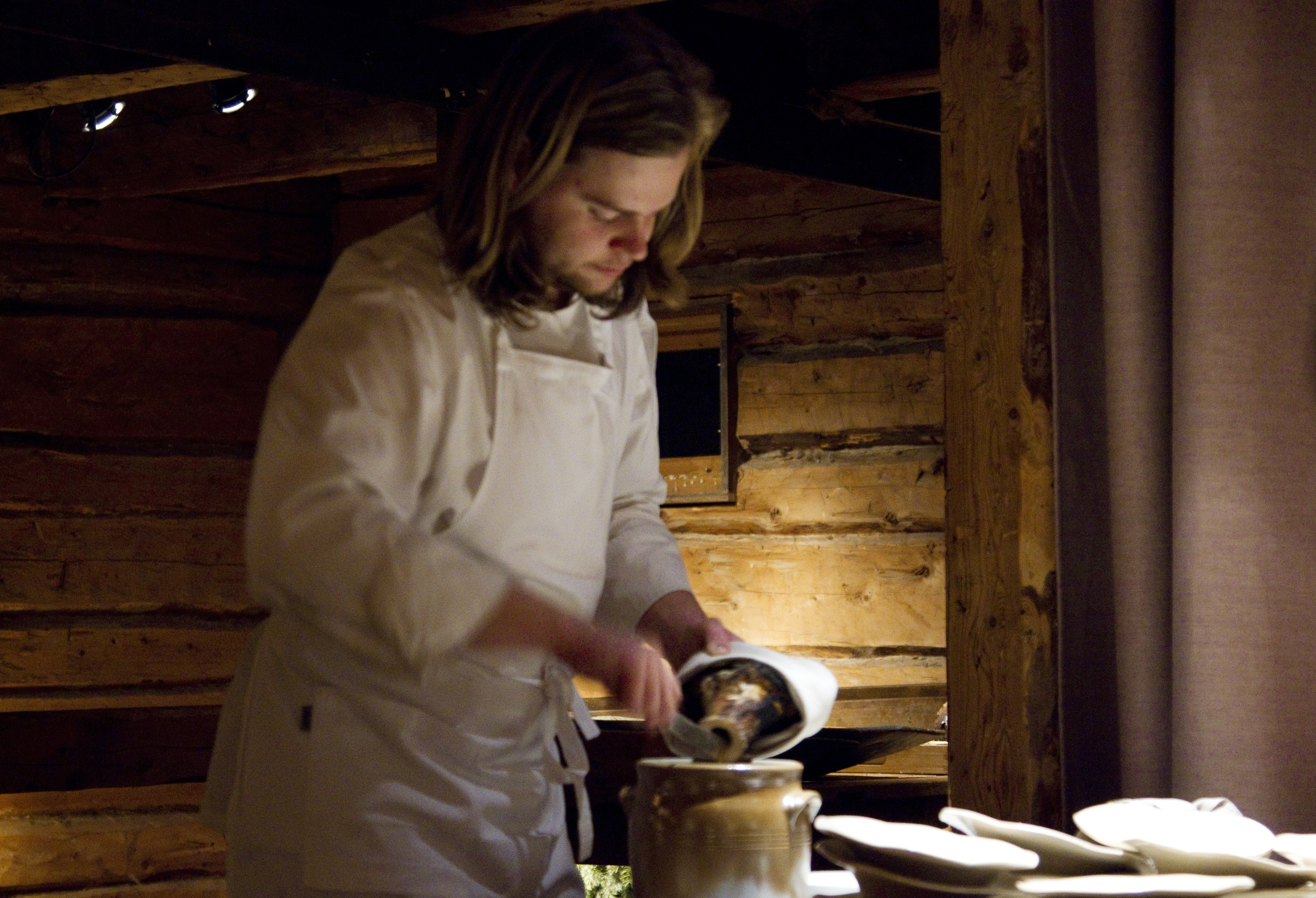
Chef Magnus Nilsson at Fäviken

The restaurant was located on the 19th century Fäviken Egendom estate, which consists of 20,000 acres of farmland, and is located around 750 kilometres (470 mi) north of Stockholm, and 25 kilometres (16 mi) by road from the Åre ski resort. The current owners purchased the property in 2003, and hired chef turned sommelier Magnus Nilsson in 2008 to oversee the wine cellars. He moved into the kitchen after being unable to find someone else to do so and became head chef. Nilsson described its former operation as a "moose fondue restaurant".

The restaurant had 16 seats, that included a communal table. Breakfast was only served to customers who stay overnight in one of the six rooms. There were three chefs at the restaurant, including Nilsson, and a total of seven staff overall including the gardener who were shared with the estate.

Nilsson released a cookbook named after the restaurant on 1 October 2012. The foreword was supplied by food writer Mattias Kroon.

=== Menu ===
The cuisine served at Fäviken were influenced by Nordic cuisine, and used local ingredients that came from either the estate or very close nearby. The exceptions to this localisation of the cuisine are sugar, salt, and alcoholic vinegar. Fish were caught by the chef himself in a local pond, with the dishes changing depending on what were caught. Nilsson has explained that he does not believe that New Nordic cuisine exists, but instead the catch-all description allows individual Scandinavian restaurants to create their own styles of food. Diners at Fäviken were typically served fourteen courses in addition to appetisers.

The dishes on the menu included warm marrowbone which is extracted from a cow's shinbone using a two-man saw in the middle of the dining room itself. That dish in particular is accompanied by diced cubes of raw beef heart, shaved carrot and green sage salt. Other theatrical dishes include an ice cream maker which Nilsson purposely does not maintain: "I deliberately don't take care of my ice cream maker so it will make a lot of eeer-awww, eeeeh-errrkk sounds" he explained.

Vegetables were sometimes stored for up to eight months in a root store before being used.

== Reception ==
Adam Sachs of Bon Appétit magazine described Fäviken as "the world's most daring restaurant".

Fäviken was named 34th in The World's 50 Best Restaurants in 2012, the first time it had appeared on the list. Chef René Redzepi, of the 1st place restaurant Noma, said "if I had a chance to go anywhere in the world right now, I would go to Fäviken." Fäviken was named to the top ten restaurants in the world by the Zagat guide in 2013. In 2016, Fäviken was awarded two stars by Guide Michelin.

A reviewer for the British newspaper The Independent wrote that "Dinner at Faviken is never anything less than interesting, even if there are elements (potatoes cooked in decomposed autumn leaves) that are more pretentious than flavourful." Another reviewer for the Daily Telegraph wrote "Faviken's peerless confluence of improbable setting, unique dishes and the castaway romance of a chef who left the world behind only for it follow him elevated our dinner into "most memorable meal ever" territory."

In 2014, season 3 of PBS's The Mind of a Chef series featured chef Nilsson in episodes 9 through 16. Each episode showed a different aspect of the chef's interest in Nordic cuisine and traditions and his process in creating dishes for Fäviken. Episode 16, titled "Fäviken," gave viewers a behind the scene look during a dinner service at the restaurant.

Fäviken and chef Magnus Nilsson were also featured in episode six of the first season of Netflix's Chef's Table series in 2015.
