= Margaret Braun =

American baker

Margaret Braun (born 1962) is a prominent New York City baker. She has funded architecture and art tours in Europe through bakery work, and this visual education is apparent in her innovative cakes. Braun's cakes have been lauded in a long list of American magazines, television programs, and in a 2001 book. She has consulted on and cooked for the movie the Great Wonderful. Oprah Winfrey is a notable celebrity fan. Some of Braun's more well-known designs and their artistic inspirations include:

- Afternoon With Frederick- inspired by the Sanssouci palace at Potsdam
- Akbar's Cake- based on Mughal dynasty designs
- Baroque in Patent Leather- inspired by a pair of platform shoes and the decorative elements of the Rococo style
- Cakewalk Through Barcelona- inspired by the architecture of Antoni Gaudí
- Decal Recall- inspired by 1970s rubber decals
- One Thousand Explosions- based on the Space Age design style of the 1950s United States
- Purple Makes the Best Winding Robe- inspired by a Byzantine mosaic at the San Vitale church in Ravenna
