= Arpège (restaurant) =

Coordinates: 48.8557°N 2.3170°E

- Interactive map of Arpège

Restaurant information
- Food type: Haute cuisine
- Rating: (Michelin Guide)
- Location: Paris, France

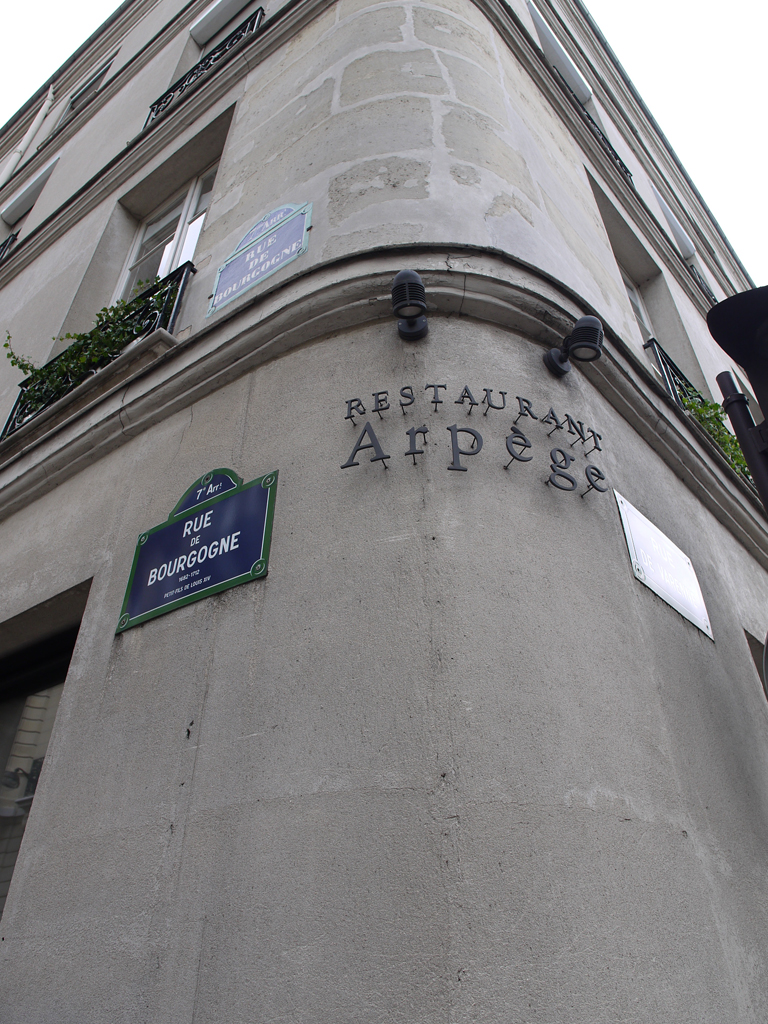
Restaurant sign of Arpège, May 2013

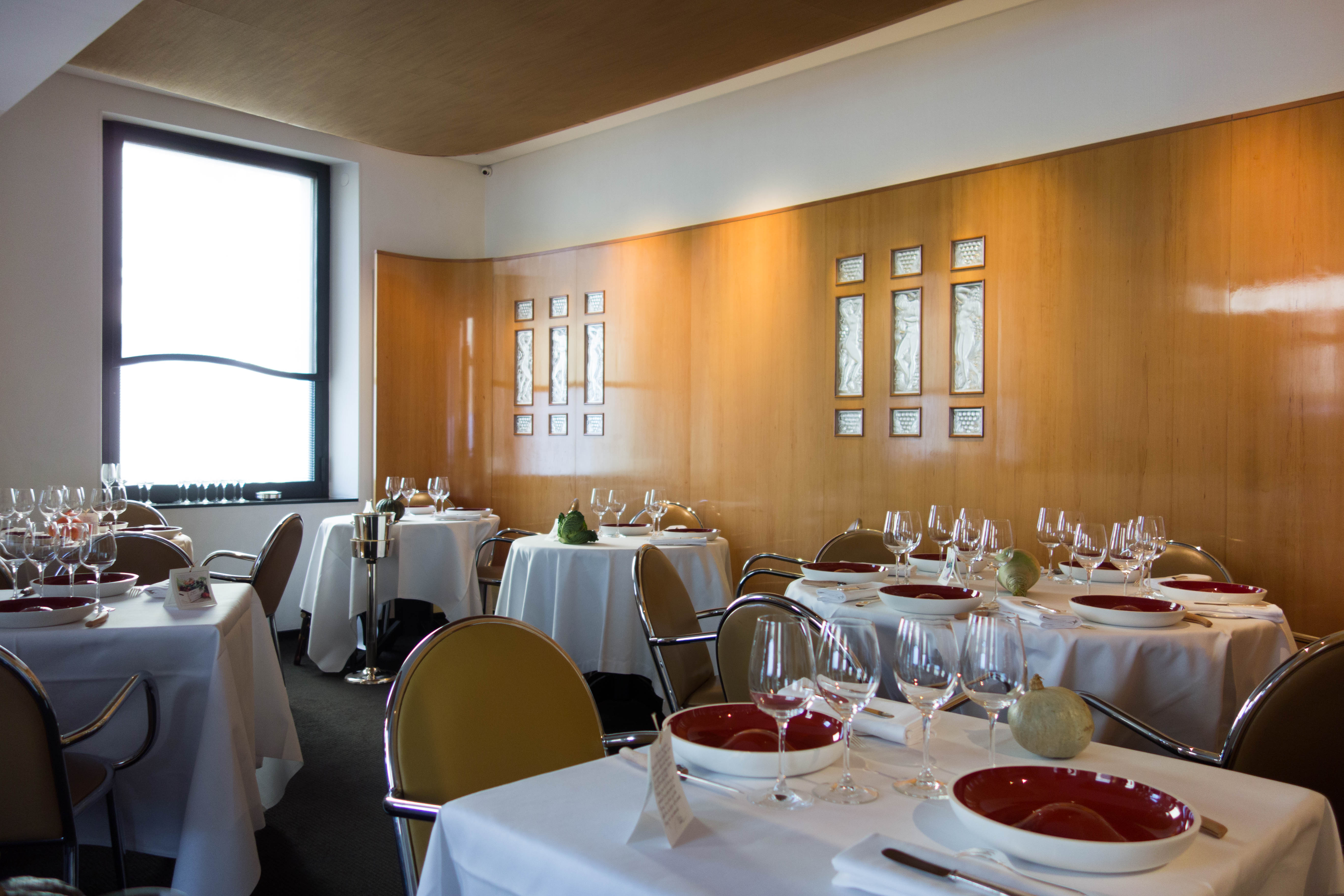
Interior view of Arpège, January 2016

Arpège (French pronunciation: [aʁpɛʒ], Arpeggio) is a 3 Michelin-star French restaurant in Paris. The chef is Alain Passard. It was previously known as L'Archestrate by Alain Senderens. Passard bought the restaurant from Senderens in 1986.

Arpège is noted for being suitable for vegetarian and vegan dining.

== Reviews and accolades ==
It earned one star in the Michelin Guide in its first year, and earned two soon thereafter. It earned three Michelin stars in 1996, which it has maintained since.

It was voted the 8th best restaurant in the world, in The World's 50 Best Restaurants in 2018.

== In popular culture ==
Two of its chefs have been challengers on Iron Chef, the popular cooking competition show on Fuji TV in Japan. Passard represented France in the 1997 Iron Chef World Cup in Kyoto and beat American Patrick Clark with homard lobster as the theme in the Western semifinal before tying Iron Chef Japanese Komei Nakamura in the final with foie gras as the theme. Passard then faced Iron Chef French Hiroyuki Sakai as the final challenger with long gang chicken as the theme in a battle to determine the world's best chef, with Sakai winning narrowly.

Tetsuya Shimada, a Japanese chef who worked at Arpège from 1987 until his return to Japan in 1992 as the restaurant's seafood specialist after Passard recognized his skills, also faced Sakai in an earlier battle, which Sakai won with black truffles as the theme.

== See also ==
- List of Michelin-starred restaurants in Paris
- Marc Vidal
