= George Duran =

American chef and entertainer (born (born 1975)

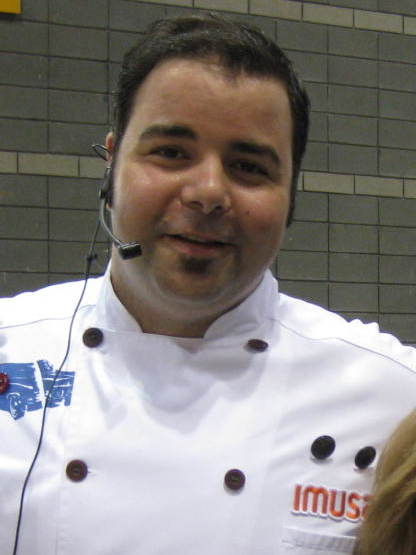
- Duran in 2012
- Born: George Kevork Guldalian; January 13, 1975 (age 51); Caracas, Venezuela
- Education: New York University; École Supérieure de Cuisine Française (ESCF) - Ferrandi
- Culinary career
- Television show(s): Pop Cuisine The Secret Life Of... Ham on the Street Ultimate Cake Off Chocolate Wars

George Kevork Guldalian (Armenian: Գևորգ Գուլդալյան; born January 13, 1975) is an American chef and entertainer who is currently a spokesman in commercials for Hunt's tomatoes. He also became host of TLC's Ultimate Cake Off in its second season.

== Biography ==
Duran was born George Kevork Guldalian in Caracas, Venezuela, to parents of Armenian descent originating from Lebanon. They later immigrated to the United States where they became naturalized Americans. Duran attended New York University, majoring in Communications Studies. It was there where he began to pursue his interests of television and radio production. Hosting the HYE Time radio show on WNYU, he won an award for Best Radio Talk Show at the National Association of College Broadcasters in 1996.

Duran continued in radio, working as an on-air personality for comedy segments at WPLJ in New York. He moved on to WABC radio in 1999 where he produced and performed more comedy sketches.

In 2000, Duran moved into television, working in production on the MTV show House of Style. From there he moved to the Latin music television station HTV in Miami.

In 2002 he moved to Paris and pursue his other interest – food. Duran attended culinary school at the École Supérieure de Cuisine Française (ESCF) - Ferrandi (English: Higher School of French Cuisine, Ferrandi Group). While there, he hosted the television show Pop Cuisine on French culinary network Cuisine TV, which was nominated for a 7 d’Or (French Emmy) award for Best Cable Show, and the winner of a 2003 Silver Grape Gastronomic Award. He also wrote culinary pieces for the French edition of FHM magazine.

In 2006, Duran hosted the cooking show Ham on the Street on the Food Network. He also took over hosting duties from Jim O'Connor for the Food Network show The Secret Life Of....

Duran published his first cookbook, Take This Dish and Twist It, in the fall of 2008.

In 2010, Duran was the host of television show Chocolate Wars featured on the TLC Channel.

Duran's culinary interests lie in French, Armenian, and South American cuisines. He is fluent in English, Spanish, French, and Armenian. He currently resides in New York.

== Promotions ==
Duran is part of cookware company IMUSA's Chef Program, participating with the brand by creating exclusive recipes, webisodes, instructional videos and demos. His Hispanic roots are expressed with featured recipes such as "Pumpkin Pie Tamales" and Chorizo Lentil Stew.

In August 2011, Duran was employed by the Ketchum public relations firm in order to promote processed food products from ConAgra, hosting guests which included food bloggers at fictitious West Village Restaurant Sotto Terra, without informing them of the nature of the meal until after the fact.
