= Alain Passard =

French chef

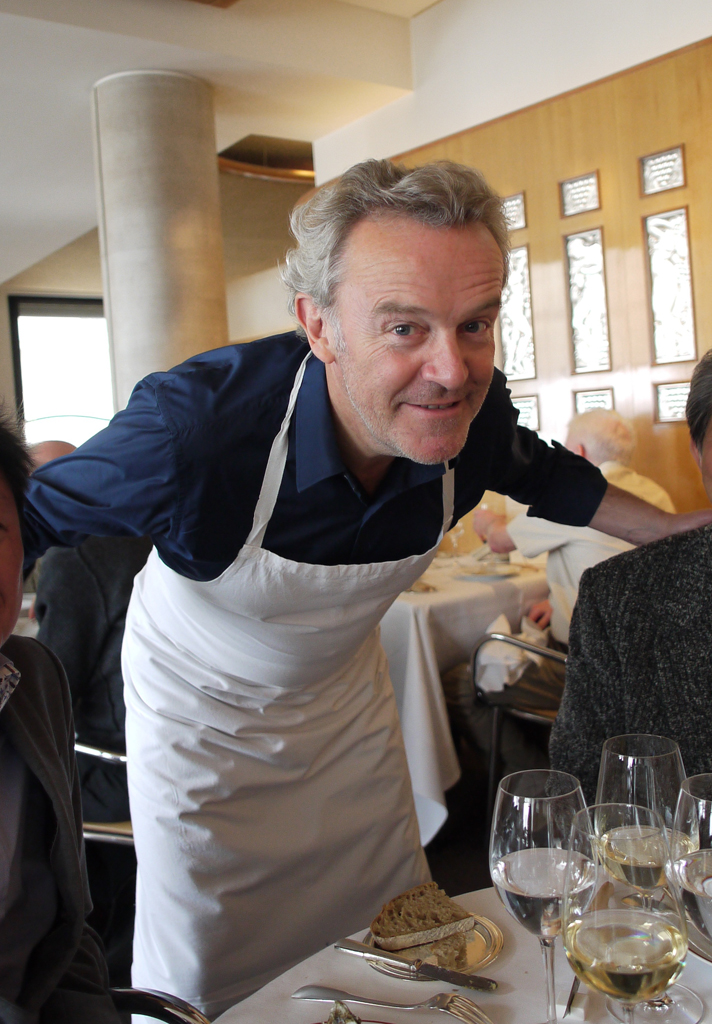
- Alain Passard in 2013
- Born: 4 August 1956 (age 70); La Guerche-de-Bretagne, France
- Culinary career
- Cooking style: Haute cuisine
- Rating
- Michelin stars
- Current restaurant
- L'Arpège
- Previous restaurants
- Le Lion d'Or; La Chaumière
- Website: alain-passard.com

Alain Passard (French pronunciation: [alɛ̃ pasaʁ]; born 4 August 1956 at La Guerche-de-Bretagne, France) is a French chef and owner of the three Michelin star restaurant L'Arpège in Paris.

The son of musicians, Passard plays the saxophone.

== History and mentors ==
Alain Passard began his career at Le Lion d'Or in Liffré from 1971 to 1975 under the Michelin-starred Breton Chef Michel Kéréver. There, he was exposed to the fundamentals of classic cuisine. The following year, from 1975 to 1976, Passard entered La Chaumière under triple Michelin Star-holder Gaston Boyer, a culinary classicist. In 1977, Passard worked as a member of a small kitchen team at L'Archestrate, led by Alain Senderens. In 1980, at Le Duc d'Enghien at the Enghien Casino, Passard received two Michelin stars at the age of 26. At the Carlton of Brussels in 1984, he also received two Michelin stars.

== Influence on culinary culture ==
Chef David Kinch of the Los Gatos, California restaurant Manresa cites Passard as "the chef who has most inspired me" in his 2013 cookbook. "He is the only chef I've ever met that I can unequivocally call a true artist". He also inspired Japanese chef Fumiko Kono, training her to become a chef and teaching that colors, shapes, odors, and taste must be rigorously selected so that artistry can emerge from the quality of the product.

L'Arpege has also produced a number of chefs and maitre d's significant to French gastronomy:

- Chef Pascal Barbot and Maitre d' Christophe Rohat of L'Astrance restaurant
- Chef David Toutain
- Chef Gunther Hubrechson (now in Singapore)
- Owner Laurent Lapaire of Agape restaurants

== L'Arpège ==
Passard purchased L'Archestrate, located on the corner of rue de Varenne and rue de Bourgogne, from his mentor, Alain Senderens, in 1986.

He renamed it L'Arpège, in tribute to his love for music, and gave it an Art Deco style interior. It earned one star in the Michelin Guide in its first year, and a second soon thereafter. It earned three Michelin stars by 1996, which it has maintained since. In 2010, he was awarded a "pépite" during the Globes de Cristal ceremony, in honor of his involvement in the fostering of French culture.

== Vegetable farming ==
In 2001, Passard had grown uninspired by cooking meat, and introduced for the first time in a three-star restaurant, at least in France, menus that would put vegetables at the centre of the plate, effectively banning meat from his restaurant. He later reintroduced meat and fish, but in smaller portions.

Passard has been planning his menu based on the seasons, sourcing natural and organically grown products from artisans and farmers, including his own: Passard's desire to work with quality products led him to create three "kitchen gardens". The first took root in 2002 in the soil of Sarthe, the second in 2005 in Eure and the third in 2008 in Manche, three Départements of Western France. Three gardens in three different terroirs, giving the respective vegetables a soil-suffused signature: sand in Sarthe for carrots, asparagus and leeks; clay in Eure for celeriac and cabbage, and lastly, alluvia in Manche for aromatic herbs.

The farms produce 40 tons annually of organic produce. Animal traction is employed for plowing and harvesting. It is the only restaurant to self-manage its vegetable, herb and red and black fruit production. Twelve gardeners work the trio's combined six hectares (15 acres), where donkeys, mares, cows, hens and goats also maintain residence.

== Art and AI ==
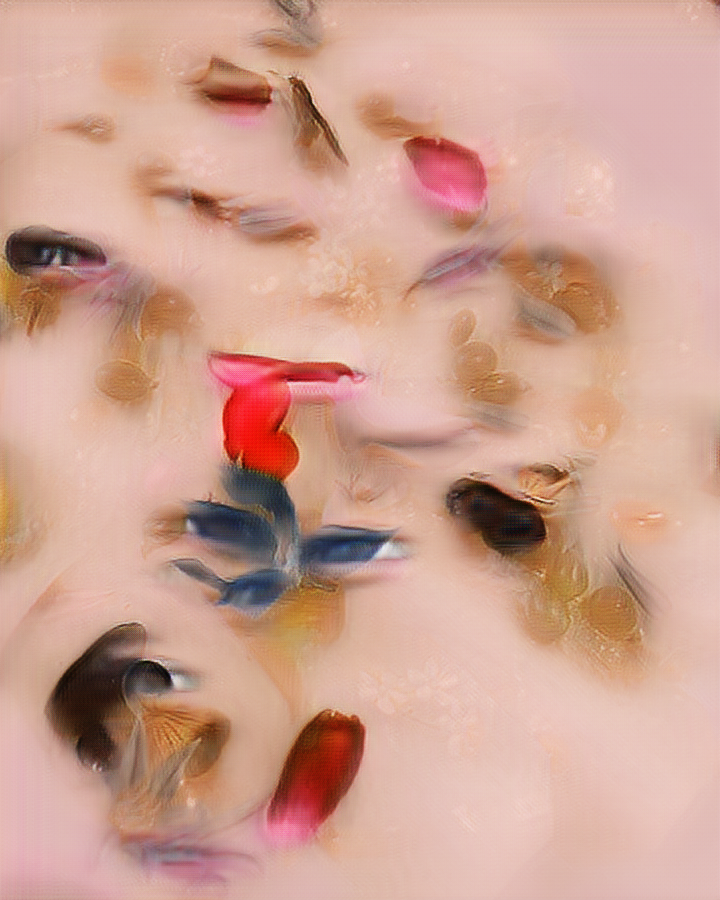
Emily Spratt, Thomas Fan, with Alain Passard. Gastronomic Algorithm, Plate 6p130fa2ffptl, New York, 2019.

Passard is also a prolific visual artist working in the medium of collage, amongst other media. In recognition of the unique visual qualities of his plates together with his collages, Passard collaborated with art historian Emily L. Spratt to create a gastronomic algorithm that uses artificial intelligence to explore the relationship between sight and taste, and the interaction of all of the senses with the primary sense of vision, in the act of creativity itself. Together they produced machine-generated images of collages in the style of Passard based on the photographs of the Michelin plates, and also experimented with portraiture in an attempt to produce an artwork inspired by the Renaissance painter Giuseppe Arcimboldo.

The results of the collaboration were revealed at the Global Forum on AI for Humanity, which was hosted by President Emmanuel Macron at the Institute de France, in the exhibition "Au-delà du Terroir, Beyond AI Art" on 28–30 October 2019. Passard is the first chef to use AI to explore the visual qualities of his plates with an art historian and computer scientist.

== Bibliography ==
- The art of cooking with vegetables by Alain Passard, Frances Lincoln, 2012.
- En cuisine avec Alain Passard, Christophe Blain, Gallimard, 2011.
