= Maria Menounos =

American and Greek TV host (born 1978)

- Μαρία Μενούνος
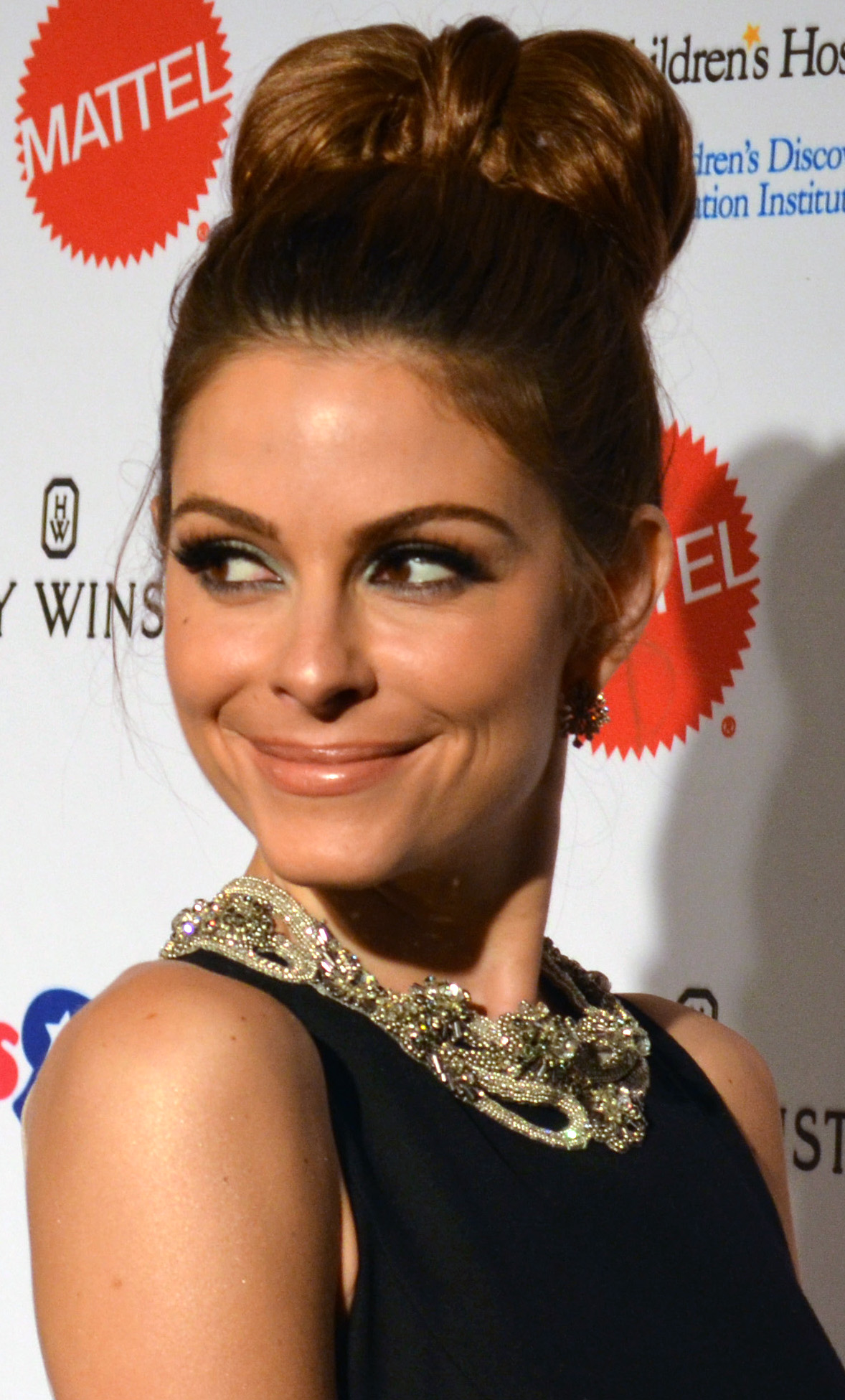
- Menounos in 2014
- Born: June 8, 1978 (age 48); Medford, Massachusetts, U.S.
- Citizenship: U.S.; Greece
- Education: Emerson College
- Occupations: TV host; pro wrestler; podcaster
- Years active: 1996–present
- Spouse: Keven Undergaro (m. 2017)
- Children: 1

Maria Menounos (/məˈnuːnoʊs/ mə-NOO-nohss; Greek: Μαρία Μενούνος [maˈri.a meˈnunos]; born June 8, 1978) is an American and Greek television host, podcaster, and former professional wrestler. She has hosted Extra and E! News; she was a TV correspondent for Today, Access Hollywood, and co-hosted the Eurovision Song Contest 2006 in Athens. Menounos co-created and is currently the CEO of the online podcast series network AfterBuzz TV. She is currently signed to WWE, where she has served as an ambassador since 2013, having even competed in some tag team events as a pro since 2009. She hosted the podcast Conversations with Maria Menounos. Menounos also co-hosted the Miss Universe 2023 pageant.

== Early life ==
Menounos was born to Greek immigrants on June 8, 1978, in Medford, Massachusetts. Her father, Konstantinos "Kostas" Menounos, is from Akovos, and her mother, Stavroula "Litsa" (née Kapernekas; 1954–2021), was from Kalamata. Menounos later worked as a janitor in the nightclub The Channel with her parents. She has a younger brother. She graduated from Medford High School in 1996.

In 1995, Menounos began to compete in beauty pageants. The following year, she won the title of Miss Massachusetts Teen USA and competed at Miss Teen USA—where she placed in the top 15, receiving an honorary mention during the preliminary competition. Menounos placed 13th in the preliminaries. She competed for the title of Miss Massachusetts USA 2000 and was the first runner-up.

Menounos attended Emerson College, participating there in the organization Emerson Independent Video; she graduated in 2000.

== Career ==
=== Film, television, and radio ===
During her senior year at Emerson, Menounos worked as a reporter for Channel One News. For her 10-minute segments, she traveled to El Salvador to report on the January 2001 and February 2001 earthquakes, interviewed NATO aircrew members aboard an E-3 AWACS plane during the military alliance's Operation Eagle Assist, and interviewed President George W. Bush.

Entertainment Tonight hired Menounos as a correspondent in 2002; she reported on movies, music, and fashion. She left the program in 2005 to focus on her acting career, although she joined rival program Access Hollywood that fall as a correspondent.

She went on to co-host a few episodes of the Today show in the late summer and fall of 2006 as well as in April 2007. In 2003, she appeared on the November 30 episode of Punk'd as one of many celebrities caught in the awkward and embarrassing "Red Carpet Interviews".

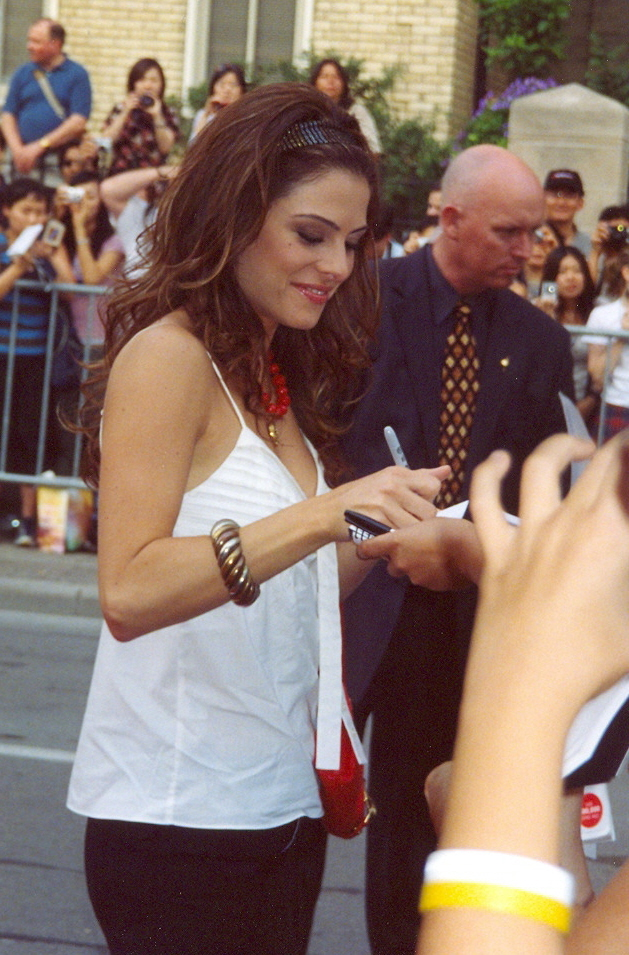
Menounos signing autographs in 2005

In 2004, Menounos appeared in an episode of the UPN series One on One as Glenda, an eccentric, self-proclaimed "Fairy Godmother to the Stars". In the summer of 2005, she appeared in the comic book film Fantastic Four playing a nurse romanced by the Human Torch (Chris Evans). Her likeness and voice was featured in the 2005 Electronic Arts video game James Bond 007: From Russia with Love as Eva Adara, Red Grant's henchwoman, which stars Sean Connery as James Bond. She is a spokesperson for Pantene hair products. Menounos presented the 2006 Eurovision Song Contest (along with Greek singer Sakis Rouvas) which took place in Athens. She directed Longtime Listener, starring Wilmer Valderrama. The film was an official selection of the Tribeca Film Festival 2006. She acted in and produced Adventures of Serial Buddies, which is credited with being the first serial killer buddy comedy.

At the age of 17, Menounos produced In the Land of Merry Misfits, an independent film fairy tale. The 35 mm feature film was produced by Menounos while attending Emerson College with director Keven Undergaro, then head writer for MTV's Singled Out. The negative of the film was stolen and the film was never completed but her work on the film, and the film's director, helped her land her reporting job at Channel One News and at MTV (ET on MTV). In 2005, she personally funded the recovery and restoration of the film, which was narrated by John Waters and starred an eclectic group in the Waters vein—including former WWE champion Bob Backlund, actress Josie Davis from the TV show Charles in Charge, and B-movie icon Randal Malone. The film premiered at the 2007 Tribeca Film Festival.

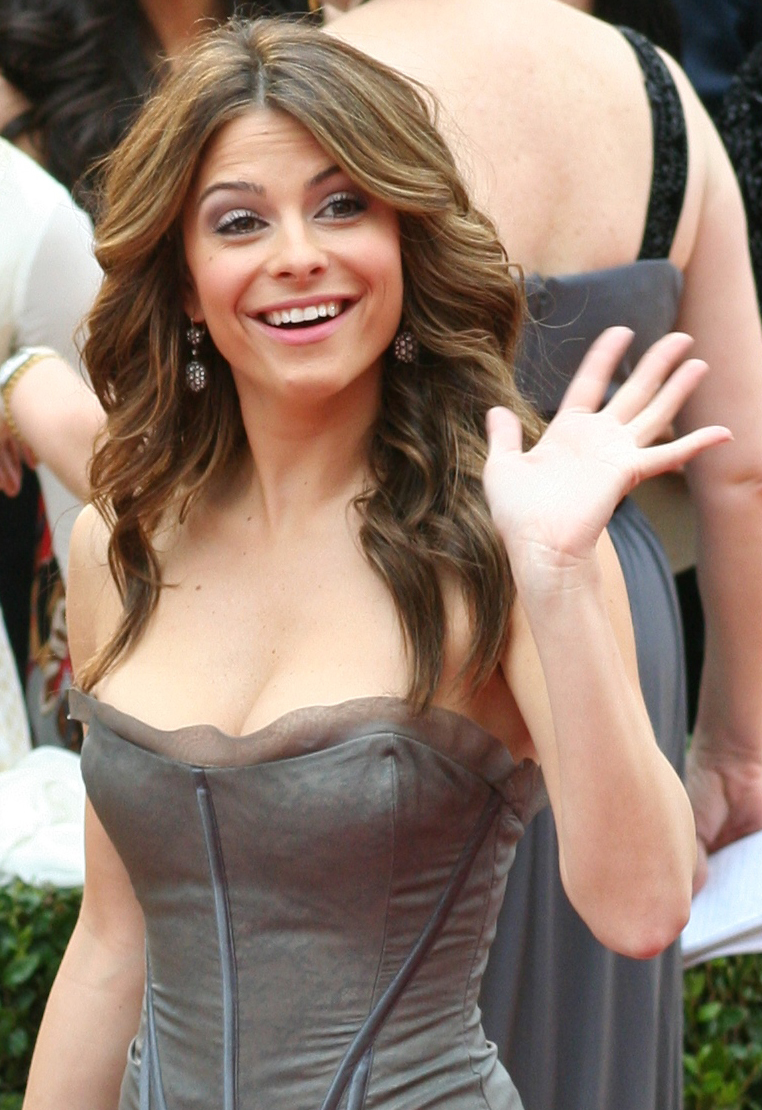
Menounos in February 2009

Menounos also maintains AfterBuzzTV, an online entertainment network she founded with Undergaro, for which she was named the 2014 CES Entertainment Matters Ambassador. As an actress, she had recurring roles on the CBS-TV program Without a Trace and as Jules in the second season of The CW's One Tree Hill (during its run on The WB). Menounos also appeared on the Scrubs episode "My Extra Mile", which aired in May 2006 where she is attracted to John Dorian because she likes his hair. In 2006, she appeared in the music video for "A Public Affair" by Jessica Simpson. On April 27, 2007, Menounos starred in Kickin' It Old Skool. In 2007, she continued in her run as international spokesperson doing print and television commercials for Pantene hair products as well as print ads for New York & Company. From December 17 to 20, 2007, she hosted the reality game show miniseries Clash of the Choirs.

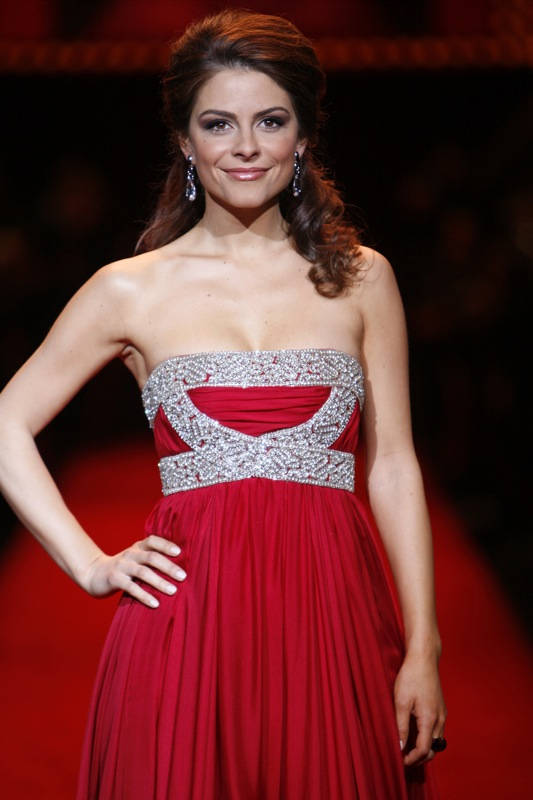
Menounos at The Heart Truth Fashion Show 2008

In 2008, she became the host of Hollywood Green on the Planet Green network. In 2008, she had a role in the movie Tropic Thunder, and in the same year became the first (and to date the only) journalist to interview the entire Obama family as a whole. She also reported for NBC Nightly News.

In May 2008, Menounos played in the AVP Cuervo Gold Crown Huntington Beach Open but was eliminated in the qualifying round. On July 13, 2008, she played in the celebrity softball game at Yankee Stadium in New York. In November 2008, when Richard Belzer fell ill, she filled in as host for the North Shore Animal League's Dogcatemy Celebrity Gala, which is held at NYC's Capitale. From 2009 to 2012, she hosted various reunion specials of MTV's The Real World and The Challenge. She appeared on the 2008 Knight Rider series episode "Fly by Knight", which aired on February 11, 2009; she played a DEA agent who is in charge of investigating a plane crash.

On August 4, 2011, it was announced that she would join Warner Bros.'s Extra, where she co-hosted the show with Mario Lopez. She also had on-air duties at Dr. Drew's Lifechangers, with plans to develop new projects. For her work on Extra, Menounos won a Daytime Emmy Award for Outstanding Entertainment News Program. She was a contestant on the 14th season of Dancing with the Stars partnering with Derek Hough. The couple was eliminated on May 15, 2012 placing fourth in the competition. In May 2013, Menounos began a new interview series called Conversations with Maria Menounos; Zoe Saldaña was her first guest. On February 6 2012, Menounos did a show in only a New York giants bikini after losing a bet on the Patriots she placed with her fellow host Lopez. After the Giants won Super Bowl XLVI, Menounos honored her word and wore nothing but a bikini on their next on air appearance.

On March 18, 2014, Menounos' reality TV series Chasing Maria Menounos premiered on the Oxygen Network.

In May 2014, after three years of hosting Extra, Menounos left the show signing a multi-year contract with E! Entertainment to host and produce several programs. In July 2015, The Hollywood Reporter announced that she would replace Giuliana Rancic as the co-anchor of E! News. In July 2017, Menounos stepped down due to an ongoing battle with a brain tumor.

In 2015, it was announced that Menounos would host a daily, one-hour radio show on SiriusXM called Conversations with Maria on Stars 109. The same year, Menounos was named the host of National CineMedia's pre-show program FirstLook shown in movie theaters, and has been the host of their pre-show program Noovie since its launch in 2017.

In 2020, GSTV announced a partnership to air short-form videos called Better Together with Maria Menounos on GSTV-affiliated gas pump video screens in more than 28,000 locations. The brief videos feature Menounos providing tips for physical and emotional health, relationship advice, and other wellness-based information.

In June 2021, Menounos hosted the reunion show for season one of The Challenge: All Stars, a special-limited series of the MTV reality-competition series The Challenge, alongside Nate Burleson. In December 2021, Menounos hosted the reunion show for the 37th season of the main series of The Challenge, titled The Challenge: Spies, Lies & Allies.

In 2025, Menounos worked with Taye Diggs in the Lifetime short film I'll Be Home for Margarita Day which was presented by Chili's.

=== Professional wrestling ===
World Wrestling Entertainment/WWE (2009–2019) Menounos is a long-time WWE fan and has made several appearances with WWE. Her first appearance was on October 12, 2009; Menounos joined Nancy O'Dell and guest hosted WWE Raw. She made her in-ring debut that night in a six diva tag team match with Gail Kim and Kelly Kelly against Alicia Fox, Beth Phoenix, and Rosa Mendes; Menounos' team was victorious; a highlight was Menounos slapping the much larger-stature Phoenix.

On December 11, 2011, at WWE Tribute to the Troops, Menounos returned and teamed with Alicia Fox, Eve Torres, and Kelly Kelly to defeat the team of The Bella Twins (Brie and Nikki) and The Divas of Doom (Phoenix and Natalya). Menounos got the win for her team by pinning Phoenix.

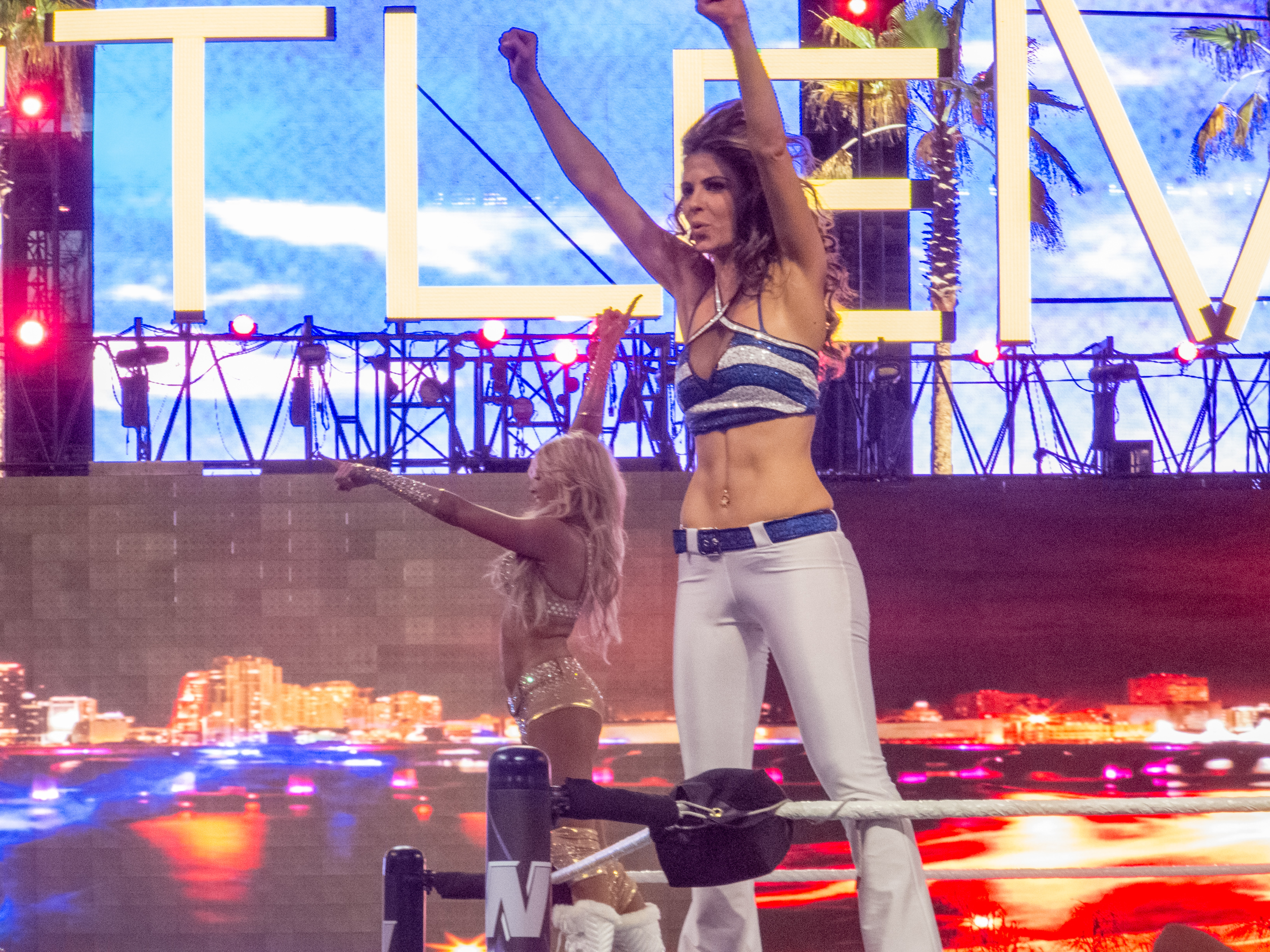
Menounos (front) celebrating her victory at WrestleMania XXVIII along with tag-team partner Kelly Kelly in April 2012

Menounos continued her feud with WWE Divas Champion Phoenix after Phoenix and Eve Torres interrupted an interview segment with Kelly Kelly on Extra. This led to a tag team match at WrestleMania XXVIII with Menounos teaming with Kelly Kelly to take on Phoenix and Torres. Despite suffering two cracked ribs during practice for Dancing with the Stars before the match, Menounos and Kelly were successful in defeating Phoenix and Torres on April 1, 2012, at WrestleMania, with Menounos pinning Phoenix for the win.

On April 6, 2013, at Madison Square Garden, Menounos inducted Bob Backlund into the WWE Hall of Fame. On August 18, 2013, at SummerSlam Axxess, she teamed with Natalya defeating Brie Bella and Eva Marie.

On August 17, 2014, Menounos was seen at the SummerSlam pay-per-view, appearing in the crowd and later in a backstage segment with Stephanie McMahon, who accepted Menounos's challenge for the ALS Ice Bucket Challenge. Menounos was actually nominated by McMahon's father and chairman of WWE, Vince McMahon.

She has hosted the WWE Hall of Fame red carpet pre-show for six years in a row (2014-2019). She also appeared during the event as a guest backstage interviewer for WrestleMania 31, WrestleMania 32 and WrestleMania 33. In 2016, Menounos appeared in one episode of the WWE Network's Swerved and was a backstage interviewer for SummerSlam. On January 28, 2018, she was the special guest ring announcer for the first-ever women's Royal Rumble match at the Royal Rumble.

== Charity work ==
In a 2008 NBC interview, Menounos shared she has been involved in charity work since age 13 and has always wanted to be able to help many causes in the charity world.

Menounos founded the charity "Take Action Hollywood!" after her trip to South Africa, where she reported on the effects of the AIDS crisis there. She created the Cosmo Girl Cup, a national, annual competition and award given to the group of teens who do the most in their communities to affect for positive social change. Menounos presented at the Earth Day Network's Climate Rally in Washington, DC on April 25, 2010. in 2012 Menounos took part in Red Cross's and AMC joint effort to raise awareness for donating blood.

== Heal Squad ==
In 2017, Menounos started Heal Squad, a daily podcast focusing on healing inspired from her own battles surviving a brain tumor, pancreatic cancer, developing diabetes, infertility, and caregiving for her mother during her own fight with a brain tumor.

== Personal life ==
In 2012, Menounos posed nude for the May issue of Allure magazine. In the same year, Menounos told Howard Stern that she had previously been sexually abused by two doctors during medical examinations.

In April 2017, she had surgery to remove a meningioma, an intracranial tumor which was benign. In January 2023, she was diagnosed with stage II pancreatic cancer and underwent surgery. The cancer was found on a whole body MRI screening, after being missed earlier on a hospital-ordered CT test.

Menounos married Keven Undergaro in Times Square during the 2017 New Year's festivities in a ceremony officiated by Steve Harvey and then again in a 2018 Greek Orthodox wedding in her father's village of Akovos, Greece. On February 7, 2023, Menounos and her husband announced they were having a baby with the aid of a surrogate.

Menounos announced her dual citizenship between the United States and Greece on May 19, 2023.

== Accolades ==
She was Spike TV's 2005 "Cyber Vixen of the Year", and the 2010 Madden NFL Pro-AM MVP. In 2014 Extra, which she co-hosts, won the Daytime Emmy award for Outstanding Entertainment News Program.

On September 15, 2026, Maria was awarded the CineHealth Lifetime Achievement Award for her public health advocacy, sharing her personal health journeys which include navigating her own brain tumor and pancreatic cancer diagnoses, and hosting the Heal Squad podcast to help others self advocate.

== Books ==
- The Everygirl's Guide to Life (2001), ISBN 978-0061870781
- The Everygirl's Guide to Diet and Fitness (2014), ISBN 978-0804177139
- The Everygirl's Guide to Cooking (2016), ISBN 978-0804177146
- Better Together (2021)

== Filmography ==
=== Films ===
Year	Title	Role	Notes
2005	Fantastic Four	Nurse	
2006	Fwiends.com	Gladys	Short film
2007	Kickin' It Old Skool	Jennifer	
2007	In the Land of Merry Misfits	Risandra	Voice role
2008	Tropic Thunder	Herself	Cameo appearance
2011	Adventures of Serial Buddies	Katelyn	
2012	The Elders	Producer	Producer
2013	Paranormal Movie	Dr. Luni	
2015	Entourage	Herself	

=== Television ===
Year	Title	Role	Notes
2000	Channel One News	Herself	Host
2002–2005	Entertainment Tonight	Herself	Correspondent
2002	Sabrina, the Teenage Witch	Reporter #1	Episode: "Free Sabrina"
2003	Without a Trace	Chris Sanders	Episode: "Trip Box"
2003	Punk'd	Herself	1 episode
2004	One on One	Glenda	Episode: "We'll Take Manhattan"
2004–2005	One Tree Hill	Emily "Jules" Chambers	10 episodes
2005–2011	Access Hollywood	Herself	Correspondent
2006	Eurovision Song Contest	Herself	Co-host
2006	Scrubs	Tamara	Episode: "My Extra Mile"
2006	Entourage	Herself	Episode: "Aquamom"; cameo appearance
2007	Clash of the Choirs	Herself/host	
2009	Knight Rider	DEA Agent Jessie Renning	Episode: "Fly by Knight"
2009–2011; 2021–2025	The Challenge	Herself	Host of Reunion episodes for select seasons
2009–2012	The Real World	Herself	Host of Reunion episodes for select seasons
2009	WWE Raw	Co-Host/Herself	Special
2010	Entourage	Herself	Episode: "Buzzed"; cameo appearance
2011–2014	Extra	Herself/host	
2011	Funny or Die Presents	Talk Show Host	"Paco Dances" segment
2012	Sesame Street	Herself	Episode: "The All of Our Senses Club"; cameo appearance
2012	Dancing with the Stars	Herself	Season 14 contestant
2012	WrestleMania XXVIII	Herself	Wrestled with Kelly Kelly to face Beth Phoenix and Eve
2012	Louie	Entertainment news anchor	Episode: "Late Show: Part 2 & 3"
2012–2013	The High Fructose Adventures of Annoying Orange	Herself	Guest appearance
2013	WWE Hall of Fame	Herself	Inducted Bob Backlund
2013	The Eric Andre Show	Herself	Episode: "Maria Menounos; Eric Balfour"
2013	Hell's Kitchen	Herself	Episode: "7 Chefs Compete Part 2"; Chef's table guest in the blue kitchen
2013	The Mindy Project	Herself	2 episodes
2013–2014	Nashville	Herself	2 episodes
2013–2017	Live from E!	Herself	Co-host
2014	Chasing Maria Menounos	Herself	
2014–present	Bar Rescue	Herself	Recon Spy; 6 episodes
2014	WWE Hall of Fame	Herself	Co-Host of the Red Carpet Pre-Show on the WWE Network
2014	Ridiculousness	Herself	Guest
2014	Untold	Herself	Host
2014	Botched	Herself	Host of the two-part reunion episode
2015	The Celebrity Apprentice 7	Herself	Guest donor for Team Infinity on Episode 1
2015	Sharknado 3: Oh Hell No!	C.J. Sorkin	Television film
2015	WrestleMania 31	Herself	Guest backstage interviewer
2015	Total Divas	Herself	1 episode
2015–2017	E! News	Herself	Anchor
2016	Cupcake Wars	Herself	Celebrity baker
2016	Have You Been Paying Attention?	Herself	Guest quiz master
2017	Total Bellas	Herself	Episode: "Bella-Mania"
2018	Royal Rumble	Herself	Guest ring announcer
2019	Ryan's Mystery Playdate	Reporter	Episode: "Ryan's Camera Ready Playdate/Ryan's Rattlin' Playdate"
2020	The Boys	Herself	Episode: "Nothing Like It in the World"
2021	Celebrity Wheel of Fortune	Herself	Episode: "Constance Zimmer, Maria Menounos, and Yvette Nicole Brown"
2021	The Challenge: All Stars	Herself	Reunion show host
2021	The Holiday Fix-Up	Jenny	Television film
2022	The Pentaverate	Herself	6 episodes
2022	The Holiday Dating Guide	Abigale Slater	Television film
2023	Miss Universe 2023	Herself	Final Show Co-Host
2024	Christmas at Plumhill Manor	Margot Stone	Television film
2025	I'll Be Home for Margarita Day	Liz	Television short

=== Video games ===
Year	Title	Voice Role	Notes
2005	James Bond 007: From Russia with Love	Eva Adara	Also Likeness

Preceded by Erika Ewald	Miss Massachusetts Teen USA; 1996	Succeeded by Jessica Gregory
Preceded by (Ukraine) Maria Efrosinina & Pavlo Shylko	Eurovision Song Contest presenter (with Sakis Rouvas); 2006	Succeeded by (Finland) Mikko Leppilampi & Jaana Pelkonen
