= Conversations with Maria Menounos =

- Genre: TV/Talk show
- Language: English

Production
- Production: Executive Producer: Maria Menounos; Executive Producer: Keven Undergaro; Phil Svitek – Executive Producer; Ian Keiser – Producer; Pat Lambert – Associate Producer
- Length: Approx. 1 Hour

Technical specifications
- Audio format: MP3

Publication
- Original release: May 13, 2013; Creators: Keven Undergaro & Maria Menounos
- Updates: Daily

Conversations with Maria Menounos is an interview series featuring Maria Menounos.

Conversations with Maria Menounos is produced by Menounos' own production company Underman/ Omegagirl Productions along with husband Keven Undergaro and AfterBuzz TV Executive Producer Phil Svitek.

== Background ==
Following the success of AfterBuzz TV, Menounos and producer Undergaro decided to create an interview series with celebrities. Undergaro states,

"I listened to an interview with Dick Cavett on Alec Baldwin's podcast, and in the interview Dick stated that there was a time when the networks needed tapes to record on so they would reuse a lot of his tapes which had interviews with major celebrities of the time. All those great interviews are now lost. Maria and I felt with so many celebrities in today's era, their stories needed to be captured and preserved for decades to come."

== Programming ==
Episodes of Conversations with Maria Menounos are pre-recorded and then released through the show's website, iTunes and YouTube. Each episode features a guest from the entertainment industry with a strong following or social influence. Each interview lasts typically between 45 minutes to an hour and half. Additional content for the web series includes behind the scenes moments with Menounos and her guests.

Segments from the episodes are often featured on both Extra and ExtraTV.com.

== Reception ==
The first episode, featuring Zoe Saldaña, became the #1 podcast on iTunes.

== Special guests ==
- Zoe Saldaña appeared on Monday, May 13, 2013. Saldaña discussed the death of her father, starting her own family, freezing her eggs and the controversy surrounding her film portrayal of Nina Simone.
- Perez Hilton appeared on Tuesday, July 9, 2013. He discussed fatherhood, looking for love, thoughts of suicide, his parents' trying to "cure" his homosexuality and this generation's future Hollywood legends. In the interview Perez reflected on his early career while working for STAR magazine, saying "I became depressed, like severely depressed, and that was the first time I'd ever experienced depression in my life to the point of having suicidal thoughts, daily. Like today I'm going to slit my wrists, today I'm going to jump off my building."
- Barbara Eden, the star of I Dream of Jeannie star Barbara Eden discussed her co-star Larry Hagman, the cold shoulder she received from Ann Sothern to Katharine Hepburn to Lauren Bacall and the sexual advances she received from Elvis Presley, Warren Beatty, and Desi Arnaz. Eden openly about her longtime standin Evie Moriarty (also a stand in for Marilyn Monroe) and what Evie told her about Marilyn's troubles and her last days.
- Vin Diesel discussed the deal that almost prevented him from making "Riddick" and the powerful influence that Facebook and social media has had on his career.
- Avril Lavigne appeared on September 24, 2013. She discussed her current album, her marriage to Chad Kroeger, a potential acting career and her peers and rivals in the music industry.
- Rob Lowe appeared on November 1, 2013. He discussed his role in National Geographic's "Killing Kennedy". He also discussed his role of Dr. Jack Startz in "Behind the Candelabra". Lowe also discussed running a movie studio and writing books, as well as him mentioning his desire to portray Elvis Presley.
