= 49th Street Elementary School shooting =

1984 school shooting in Los Angeles

- Location: 49th Street Elementary School, Los Angeles, California, US
- Date: February 24, 1984; 2:23 p.m. – 2:39 p.m. (PST)
- Weapons: AR-15–style rifle; 12-gauge Stoeger shotgun; 12-gauge Winchester shotgun
- Deaths: 3 (including the perpetrator)
- Injuries: 12
- Perpetrator: Tyrone Mitchell

On February 24, 1984, a school shooting took place at the 49th Street Elementary School in Los Angeles, United States. Ten-year-old student Shala Eubanks and 24-year-old passerby Carlos Lopez were killed and twelve others were wounded before the perpetrator, 28-year-old Tyrone Mitchell, killed himself.

The shooting led to debate regarding the mental health treatment system of Los Angeles, through which expansions were made to the LAPD Mental Evaluation Unit.

== Incident ==
At 2:23 p.m. on Friday, February 24, 1984, about 100 students from the 49th Street Elementary School had just emerged from their classrooms and onto the school's playground when Mitchell opened fire from the second-story bay window of his house located across the street. Police in a squad car heard shots ring out and reported the incident immediately. Mitchell shot 39 rounds from an AR-15 rifle and 18 rounds from two shotguns down into the crowd of students. Several children fell from their wounds in the schoolyard, while most escaped running back into the school. There they were taken to the library on the building's opposite side and waited while their parents were telephoned to pick them up.

Children who remained outside hid behind trees, garbage cans, and any other available cover. Some of the children were screaming and crying. Seven ambulances were dispatched to the scene. A team of paramedics rescued several children while Mitchell continued to fire from his window. Los Angeles Fire Department paramedic Jack Frye and his partner drove directly onto the schoolyard and pulled children into their ambulance. "We pulled the kids, injured or not, into the ambulance. We just wanted to get them safe. We didn't know what could happen," Frye stated later. Some of the injured students were flown out by police helicopter. When the barrage had ceased minutes later, the school was evacuated and Mitchell's house was surrounded by police.

During the ensuing siege, Hill arrived and asked police to allow her to enter the house to try to talk with Mitchell. Authorities refused her pleas, fearing she would be taken hostage. The Los Angeles Police Department's SWAT team arrived and evacuated houses adjacent to Mitchell's. The siege ended when a four-man SWAT team stormed the house shortly after 6 p.m. Police fired at least 16 canisters of tear gas into the house before the SWAT team entered. Mitchell was found laying face up on the floor of his second-story bedroom, dressed in camouflage pants, a khaki shirt, and jungle-style combat boots, with an empty knife scabbard attached to his belt. He had killed himself with a single wound to the head from a 12 gauge double-barreled shotgun. No one else was found in the house.

=== Casualties ===
At the time of the incident, Mitchell had injured 14 people, mostly children. Most were treated at local hospitals. One of the first children to fall under the attack was 10-year-old Shala Eubanks. A schoolyard supervisor, Albert Jones, 50, made several attempts to reach her, but every time he approached, he was fired upon and forced to take cover. Eubanks was carried into a classroom by two LAPD officers. Two paramedics tried to save her, but she died on the classroom floor.

By late Friday night, three other casualties were in guarded but stable condition, another was in good condition, and the rest had been released from hospitals after treatment of minor injuries. Carlos Lopez, 24, who had been jogging past the school when the shooting began, suffered gunshot wounds to the abdomen and underwent surgery at Martin Luther King Jr. Hospital, where most of his pancreas and spleen were removed. Lopez was listed in "guarded" condition for eight weeks until it worsened and he died on April 13.

== Victims ==
=== Killed ===
- Shala Eubanks, 10, shot, died within hours
- Carlos Lopez, 24, born and raised in Nayarit, Mexico, moved to Los Angeles when he was 16 performing work at a factory. Passerby, suffered gunshot wounds to the abdomen, pancreas and spleen, underwent surgery at Martin Luther King Jr. Hospital, died on April 13, 1984

=== Injured ===
- Anna Gonzales, 8, shot in the intestine, one kidney destroyed, underwent several hours of surgery at Martin Luther King Jr. Hospital
- Stephen Gomez, 9, wounded when gunfire ricocheted from the pavement, striking him in the right side of his abdomen, chest and leg, did not require surgery, treated at Martin Luther King Jr. Hospital
- Iran Macias, 10, admitted in good condition to Orthopaedic Hospital
- Albert Jones, 50, schoolyard supervisor, shotgun pellet wounds and other minor wounds, treated and released from Orthopaedic Hospital
- Latreece Williams, 11, shotgun pellet wounds and other minor wounds, treated and released from Orthopaedic Hospital
- Alicia Pena, 10, shotgun pellet wounds and other minor wounds, treated and released from Orthopaedic Hospital
- Mayra Cruz, 10, shotgun pellet wounds and other minor wounds, treated and released from Orthopaedic Hospital
- Jose Prado, 12, shotgun pellet wounds and other minor wounds, treated and released from Orthopaedic Hospital
- Mario Hernandez, 9, minor wounds
- Eloisa Cruz, 10, minor wounds
- Jose Gavino, 11, minor wounds
- Victoriano Ulloa, 11, minor wounds

== Perpetrator ==
Tyrone Mitchell

Tyrone Mitchell was born in October 17th 1955 to Lee Charles (1931–1978) and Annie Lee Mitchell (1930–1978) in Montgomery County, Alabama. He grew up in South Central Los Angeles and graduated Jefferson High School. Mitchell and his family were members of the Peoples Temple led by Jim Jones. In 1977, Mitchell's parents and siblings followed Jones to the Temple's Jonestown settlement in Guyana, leaving Mitchell behind in Los Angeles; both parents, four sisters and a brother perished in the mass murder-suicide that took place at Jonestown on November 18, 1978. According to Mitchell's fiancée, 29-year-old fellow Temple member Mary Lou Hill, he suffered a nervous breakdown as a result of the deaths of his family. He had a criminal record and was noted for abusing alcohol and PCP.

Mitchell was a student at California State University, Long Beach, for several years, where he attended a variety of classes. He did not hold a job. Hill, his fiancée, worked as a preschool teacher. Mitchell wanted to marry Hill right away, but she wanted to wait until their financial situation improved.

Hill said that Mitchell kept a "high-powered rifle" in his house and, by 1984, occasionally fired it at the sky. According to neighbors, in February 1984 he regularly fired at airliners passing overhead, which were landing at Los Angeles International Airport. These incidents were not reported to police out of fear. In an incident on February 11, one of Mitchell's uncles reported to police that Mitchell had pointed a machine gun at him. No weapon was confiscated, no arrest was made, and the matter was turned over to the city attorney.

== Aftermath ==
A funeral service for Shala Eubanks was held at 11 a.m. on Wednesday, February 29, at Roger Williams Baptist Church. Over a thousand people attended the ceremony, including Los Angeles school superintendent Harry Handler and members of the school board; school principal Charles Jackson, and almost 100 teachers and students. The funeral of Carlos Lopez was held on Saturday, April 21. Nearly 100 friends and relatives throughout the Los Angeles area, most of them factory workers like Lopez, gathered at Park Lawn Cemetery in the City of Commerce.

After the shooting, the LAPD convened a board of inquiry, with representatives from the city and county's Fire, Mental Health, and Health Services departments and advocacy groups for the mentally ill to study whether Mitchell's violent outburst might have been predicted or prevented. In 1991, California passed a law that mandated a 15-day (later 10-day) waiting period for the sale of rifles and shotguns and a background check on the buyer of the weapon.

=== Motive ===
Mitchell's motive remains unclear. According to his uncle, Mitchell had been in the house all day on the day of the shooting. Early reports assumed that his actions were linked to the deaths of his immediate family at Jonestown. A toxicological study of Mitchell's body fluids postmortem by the Los Angeles County coroner found no PCP or other illegal drugs, and only a small amount of alcohol, .03%, less than a third of the legal limit.

== See also ==
- List of school shootings in the United States by death toll
