= Untold (TV series) =

- Also known as: Untold with Maria Menounos
- Genre: News
- Presented by: Maria Menounos
- Music by: Justin Crosby
- Country of origin: United States
- Original language: English
- No. of seasons: 1
- No. of episodes: 6

Production
- Executive producer: Elisa M. Rothstein
- Producers: Victoria Coloruno-Caretto; Brian Walmsley
- Cinematography: Brad Serreno
- Editors: Brian James Crewe; Neal W. Ferraro; Najib Tabri

Original release
- Network: E!
- Release: July 17 – December 18, 2014

Untold (also Untold with Maria Menounos) is a news program, hosted by Maria Menounos, that premiered on E! at 8:00 PM Eastern/7:00 PM Central on July 17, 2014. Its format focused on deeper investigations.

Menounos described the show's concept to TheWrap as "a pop culture version of Dateline." It was also pitched as "a sixty minute news magazine show that will cover a wide range of current issues, social media phenomena, and top news events" to Inquisitr. Menounos' production company, Underman/Omegagirl, signed a first-look pact with E! network at part of her production deal.

Untold was filmed on location and used footage shot on "iPhone video, GoPro, FlipCam, and XD-Cam" footage. A segment called "The Pop Culture Minute" featured social media stars from YouTube and Vine. "The Untold Moment" was an interview segment with Hollywood celebrities.

== Episodes ==
No.	Title	Original release date	Prod. code
1	"The Relentless Pursuit of Perfection; the Royal Fishbowl; Shark Happens!"	17 July 2014	1–01
Maria Menounos, and plastic surgeons Dr. Paul Nassif and Dr. Terry Dubrow, examine how social media and selfies motivate people to undergo plastic surgery. Menounos then reports on how Prince William and Kate Middleton are modernizing the British royal family's approach to media and publicity. Finally, Menounos looks at the popularity of shark films in America, including Jaws and Sharknado.
2	"Rag to Reality; Star Stalkers; EDM-Pire"	28 August 2014	1–02
Menounos reports on how reality television stars turn 15 minutes of fame into enduring brands. The LAPD Threat Management Unit and stalkers that target celebrities are profiled. The popularity and future of electronic dance music are highlighted.
3	"Hollywood Heroin; Instafame"	18 September 2014	1–03
Menounos investigates the rise of heroin addiction in Hollywood and how it led to the death of stars such as Cory Monteith, Philip Seymour Hoffman, and Peaches Geldof. She also speaks with Mackenzie Phillips about addiction. Menounos is joined by Dr. Drew Pinsky to talk about addicts' struggle to recover and remain clean.
4	"Transgender Frontier; Depression in Hollywood"	30 October 2014	1–04
Transgender civil rights issues are highlighted, and trans stars Laverne Cox and Candis Cayne work to promote greater acceptance. Menounos presents a report about Hollywood stars dealing with depression and addiction
5	"There Goes Honey Boo Boo; from Scandal to Now; Zoe Saldana: Unstoppable 1"	20 November 2014	1–05
Here Comes Honey Boo Boo is profiled, having ended its run earlier in 2014. Zoe Saldaña is interviewed about staying fit, starring in Guardians of the Galaxy, pregnancy, and her current state of mind. She also talks about the need for greater gender equality in Hollywood concerning action movies, nudity on film, and parenthood.
6	"Child Stars: Then & Now; Inside YouTube; Psychic Hollywood"	18 December 2014	1–06
Menounos interviews Dustin Diamond and Blake McIver about the challenges child actors face as adults. She also pays a visit to YouTube's studios in Playa Vista, Los Angeles. Hollywood psychic Char Margolis, astrologer David Palmer, and pet psychic Sonia Fitzpatrick are interviewed about working for famous clients.
