= LAPD Threat Management Unit =

Anti-harassment unit of the Los Angeles Police Department

The Threat Management Unit (TMU) is the threat management unit of the Los Angeles Police Department (LAPD), tasked with investigating harassment and stalking, especially against celebrities and officials. The TMU was formed in 1990 after the murder of actress Rebecca Schaeffer. Over the years the TMU has been visited and emulated by law enforcement agencies and security companies across the United States and the world.

In April 2008, the LAPD TMU teamed up to co-deploy with the LAPD Mental Evaluation Unit (MEU) because stalking suspects often suffer from some form of mental instability, and workplace violence suspects experience some form of mental health crisis when they make threats and when they are engaging in acts of violence. The MEU Systemwide Mental Assessment Response Team (SMART) accompanies TMU on all of its calls involving stalkers and workplace violence. Both the TMU and MEU comprise the Crisis Response Support Section (CRSS).

The primary mission of the LAPD, TMU is to ensure the safety and well-being of members of the diverse communities of the City of Los Angeles by investigating and managing aggravated cases, both criminal and non-criminal, wherein individuals have demonstrated an abnormal fixation / obsession and have generated a long-term pattern of unsolicited acts of visitation, telephonic and/or written correspondence in a threatening manner toward a specific person.

The TMU is responsibilities include the following:

- Investigate aggravated criminal and at times non-criminal, cases of stalking and other threat cases on a citywide basis.
- Investigate threats directed to the city's elected officials. As a result of this responsibility, each TMU detective has an established liaison with the staff of specific City elected officials.
- Investigate aggravated workplace violence cases involving City departments and employees.
- Staff the city's Threat Assessment Team, which manages workplace violence cases perceived to present an immediate danger to City employees.
- Provide training and research that enables all department employees to become better informed and prepared to handle stalking cases.

The TMU maintains liaison with:

- LAPD Division Major Assault Crimes Coordinators.
- LAPD Central Division Unit Station #01 - 251 East 6th Street - Los Angeles, California 90014.
- LAPD Central Traffic Division Unit Station #24
- Los Angeles City Attorney's Office.
- Los Angeles County Sheriff's Department
- Los Angeles County Office of District Attorney
- United States Secret Service.
- Federal Bureau of Investigation.
- California Highway Patrol.
- Members of the entertainment industry.

Cases handled by the TMU are almost exclusively incident driven. It manages reporting of workplace violence (WPV) and threats to public officials that can often be attributed to many different variables such as environmental issues, recent political or newsworthy events, and increased awareness through training. Because stalking is a very complicated and severe crime to investigate and manage on a long-term basis, the investigations assumed by the TMU enhances the investigation and probability of arrest of the suspect and ensures that the victim's needs will be provided for while minimising the city's exposure to civil liability.

In conjunction with the Association of Threat Assessment Professionals (ATAP) the TMU plans, coordinates, staffs and co-hosts the Annual Threat Management Conference; a five-day international conference dedicated to furthering the science of threat assessment. Information on this annual event may be obtained by logging on to the Association of Threat Assessment Professionals web site.

== See also ==
- Fixated Threat Assessment Centre
