= Threat assessment and management =

Risk analysis technique

Threat assessment and management (TAM) is the practice of determining the credibility, probability, and seriousness of a potential threat and, as in 'management', working with potential perpetrators to reduce the probability of completion of a violent act. Threat assessment is distinct from violence risk assessment, which assesses a person's general capacity and tendency for violence. Instead, threat assessment aims to interrupt people on a pathway to commit "predatory or instrumental violence, the type of behavior associated with targeted attacks," according to J. Reid Meloy, PhD, co-editor of the International Handbook of Threat Assessment. "Predatory and affective violence are largely distinctive modes of violence."

Threat assessments are commonly conducted by government agencies such as the US Federal Bureau of Investigation (FBI) and educational organizations such as universities and public schools. US Federal data says for the 2023-2024 school year eighty-five percent of public schools have behavioral threat assessment teams or similar.

Many U.S. states require schools have threat assessments including Florida, Kentucky, Maryland, Ohio, Pennsylvania, Rhode Island, Texas, Virginia, and Washington state, according to a 2023 EdWeek article citing Everytown, an organization that advocates for firearm safety.

According to the United States FBI, "targeted violence" is severe, but rare.

== History ==
The Los Angeles Police Department (LAPD) created the first "Threat Management Unit", the LAPD Threat Management Unit, founded by retired LAPD captain Robert Martin, in 1990 after the murder of actress Rebecca Schaeffer.

In the wake of the Virginia Tech shooting, Virginia was the first US State to mandate that its colleges and universities, "implement policies and procedures for the prevention of violence on campus, including assessment and intervention with individuals whose behavior poses a threat to the safety of the campus community."

Since then, threat assessment and management teams have been adopted by many city, county, state and federal law enforcement agencies, including agencies from Canada, Australia, the United Kingdom, Europe, Asia, Hong Kong and South America; as well as private security consultants all seeking to implement a form of threat assessment and management team for contracted national and foreign jurisdictions.

== Step-by-step process ==
According to the United States FBI, threat assessment and management (TAM) has three key steps:

1. Identification: Bystanders notice signs such as odd or threatening communications, actual acts of violence, or suicidality. Then these observations are reported to a threat assessment team. (For various reasons such as mistrust of the system or fear of revenge, a bystander may choose not to make a report.)
2. Analysis, especially avoiding profiling and common biases such as overestimating the role of mental illness. The "totality of circumstances" should be considered using human expert judgment. Common motives for mass violence should be discerned.
3. Management, with consideration that prevention is easier than prediction. Violence prevention and support for the person should be balanced. Interventions should focus on promoting well-being and enhancing dignity.

== Best practices ==
Calhoun and Weston (2015) outline the path to violence, types of perpetrators ("hunters" and "howlers" in contrast), and guidelines for managing perpetrators. The Comprehensive School Threat Assessment Guidelines are evidence-based guidelines previously recognized by the US National Registry of Evidence-based Programs and Practices (while NREPP was still operating).

A California case that challenged the practice of threat assessments was the Taft Union case covered in the Psychology Today article "Threat Assessment Team Negligence: The Taft Union Case." This article outlines steps to avoid negligence in threat assessments based on a school shooting where in 2013 a student Brian O. came to first period with a shotgun that he fired and left a chest wound for one student and a near miss for another before Brian surrendered. He was criminally convicted and sentenced to 27 years in prison.

=== Civil damages for negligent practice ===
The ensuing California Court of Appeals civil court case found in 2022 that there was 54 percent negligence with the threat assessment and management team and awarded $3.8 million for the plaintiff, Bowe Cleveland, who was shot in the chest.

== Controversy ==
=== Assessment bias, inconsistency, and debated effectiveness ===
There is evidence that Black and Hispanic students are disproportionately determined to be threats. Students with disabilities are also disproportionately labeled as threats.

Expert threat assessors can disagree substantially on whether a threat is implied given particular evidence. According to the National Disability Rights Network, there is no universal, practical definition of threat assessment and, in many ways, the practice threatens the rights of students. In states mandating threat assessment capacity at schools, they do not always "require a specific model of threat assessment, and some do little to monitor compliance."

Editors for the New Yorker and Mother Jones disagree on whether threat assessments prevent mass shootings.

The ACLU of Vermont asserts a lack of evidence supporting threat assessment's ability to predict violence.

=== Lack of resources to support students ===
"School leaders say they lack the resources to effectively support students who are identified through the threat assessment process."

=== Stigmatization and exclusion ===
There have been more incidents covered by the media where bias may have effected students lives when they were determined to be threats as shown in cbs8.com articles about the long-term stigma of falsely being determined a threat and a twelve-year-old being arrested and subsequently charged with a felony regarding his Snapchat message in San Diego, California.

As covered by the 2016 Oregonian/OregonLive article "Targeted: A Family and the Quest to Stop the Next School Shooter," a sixteen-year-old boy on the autism spectrum eventually dropped out of school after being selected for a threat assessment. The family allowed the reporter full access to their experience of not being able to get information from the district and their son feeling singled out and criminalized. The "threat" was eventually determined to be a misunderstanding.

=== Violations of civil rights ===
The ACLU of Vermont finds 'serious risk' to the due process and privacy rights of students referred for threat assessment. Further, they list several alternative policies to increase school safety.

== Professional organizations ==
The Association of Threat Assessment Professionals (ATAP) is a multidisciplinary, non-profit professional association that supports education and research about threat assessment and management. They offer a "Certified Threat Manager" certificate.

Threat assessment is a component of the Higher Education Case Management Association's (HECMA) professional interests.

Pinkerton detective agency offers threat assessment and management services.

== See also ==
- Obligatory Dangerousness Criterion
- Private investigator
