= Keven Undergaro =

American film director

- Born: November 18, 1967 (age 58); Medford, Massachusetts, U.S.
- Education: Saint Anselm College
- Occupations: CEO of AfterBuzz TV; Podcaster; Producer; Director; Screenwriter
- Spouse: Maria Menounos (m. 2017)
- Children: 1

Keven Undergaro (born November 18, 1967) is an American writer and film producer. He is the creator of online broadcast network AfterBuzz TV.

== Early life ==
Undergaro was born into a working-class family in Medford, Massachusetts. His interests as a youth included video games, comic books, movies, and television. He was a fan of the Adam West series Batman and converted the family El Camino into his own personal Batmobile. He also made in-costume appearances as Batman and scaled a 50-foot roof in college as a stunt.

Undergaro is a graduate of Saint Anselm College, where he majored in history. He worked as a carnival worker on the east coast in the summer to afford trips to Los Angeles, where he worked as a television writer in the winter. He eventually became head writer of MTV's Singled Out.

After working for MTV, Undergaro decided to make an independent film, which left him bankrupt and homeless. Through that film, he met 17-year-old Maria Menounos.

== Career ==
Undergaro created and produced AfterBuzz TV, an online broadcast network that specialized in after-show podcasts. He has also created Black Hollywood Live, The Popcorn Talk Network, and Book Circle Online.

Undergaro co-created and works as executive producer, along with Julianne Hough and Maria Menounos, on the ABC series #DanceBattle America.

As for film, Undergaro wrote and directed indie comedy Adventures of Serial Buddies, and served as producer on the acclaimed Netflix hit This Isn't Funny. He also produced the documentaries The Elders and Losing Lebron.

Undergaro works as executive producer for SiriusXM's Conversations with Maria.

Since 2016, he has hosted and executive produced The Tomorrow Show with Keven Undergaro.

== Personal life ==
Undergaro has been in a relationship with Maria Menounos since April 1998. He proposed to her on March 9, 2016, on The Howard Stern Show. They were married on December 31, 2017, in Times Square; the ceremony was officiated by Steve Harvey and broadcast live during his New Year's Eve special on FOX. and then again in a 2018 Greek Orthodox wedding in Menounos' father's village of Akovos, Greece. On February 7, 2023, Undergaro and his wife announced they were having a baby with the aid of a surrogate.
