= Stampede Wrestling Women's Pacific Championship =

Professional wrestling women's championship

Stampede Women's Pacific Championship
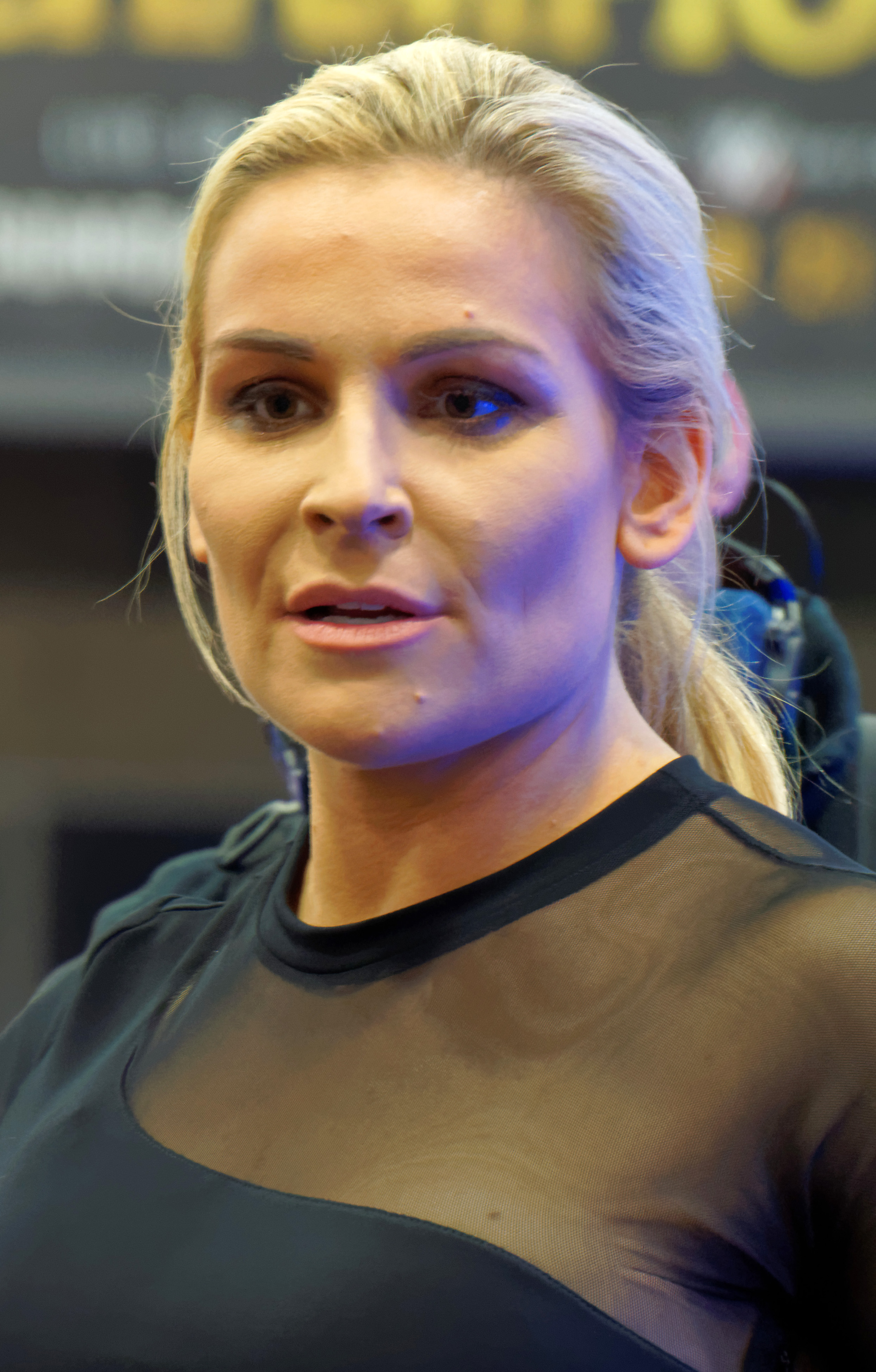
- Nattie Neidhart, inaugural and only two time champion

Details
- Promotion: Stampede Wrestling
- Date established: June 17, 2005
- Date retired: April 26, 2008
Statistics
- First champion(s): Nattie Neidhart
- Final champion(s): Belle Lovits
- Longest reign: Nattie Neidhart (133 days)
- Shortest reign: Dusty Adonis (39 days)

The Stampede Women's Pacific Championship is the major title for female wrestlers in the Canadian professional wrestling promotion Stampede Wrestling.

As it was a professional wrestling championship, the championship was not won not by actual competition, but by a scripted ending to a match determined by the bookers and match makers. (Note: Hornbaker (2016) p. 550: "Professional wrestling is a sport in which match finishes are predetermined. Thus, win–loss records are not indicative of a wrestler's genuine success based on their legitimate abilities – but on now much, or how little they were pushed by promoters") On occasion the promotion declares a championship vacant, which means there is no champion at that point in time. This can either be due to a storyline, (Note: Duncan & Will (2000) p. 271, Chapter: Texas: NWA American Tag Team Title [World Class, Adkisson] "Championship held up and rematch ordered because of the interference of manager Gary Hart") or real life issues such as a champion suffering an injury being unable to defend the championship, (Note: Duncan & Will (2000) p. 20, Chapter: (United States: 19th Century & widely defended titles – NWA, WWF, AWA, IW, ECW, NWA) NWA/WCW TV Title "Rhodes stripped on 85/10/19 for not defending the belt after having his leg broken by Ric Flair and Ole & Arn Anderson") or leaving the company. (Note: Duncan & Will (2000) p. 201, Chapter: (Memphis, Nashville) Memphis: USWA Tag Team Title "Vacant on 93/01/18 when Spike leaves the USWA.")

== Title history ==
Key
No.	Overall reign number
Reign	Reign number for the specific champion
Days	Number of days held

No.	Champion	Championship change			Reign statistics		Notes	Ref.
No.	Champion	Date	Event	Location	Reign	Days	Notes	Ref.
1	Nattie Neidhart	June 17, 2005	Stampede show	Calgary, AB	1	133	Defeated Anna Marie, Belle Lovitz and Ma Myers in a four-way match to become the first champion.	
2	Dusty Adonis	October 28, 2005	Stampede show	Calgary, AB	1	49	Adonis is a male wrestler.	
3	Nattie Neidhart	December 16, 2005	Stampede show	Calgary, AB	2	(Note: The exact date Neidhart lost the championship has not been documented, putting her title reign at between 26 and 93 days.)	This was a three-way match, also involving Belle Lovitz.	
4	Dusty Adonis	February 10, 2006	Stampede show	N/A	2	(Note: The exact date Adonis won the championship has not been documented, putting his title reign at between 1 day and 68 days.)		
5	Belle Lovitz	March 10, 2006	Stampede show	Calgary, AB	1	(Note: The exact date the championship was abandoned has not been documented, putting the title reign at between 753 and 782 days.)	This was a three-way match, also involving Madison.	
—		April 26, 2008	—	—			Title became inactive when the promotion closed.	
