= Natalya Neidhart =

Canadian-American professional wrestler (born 1982)

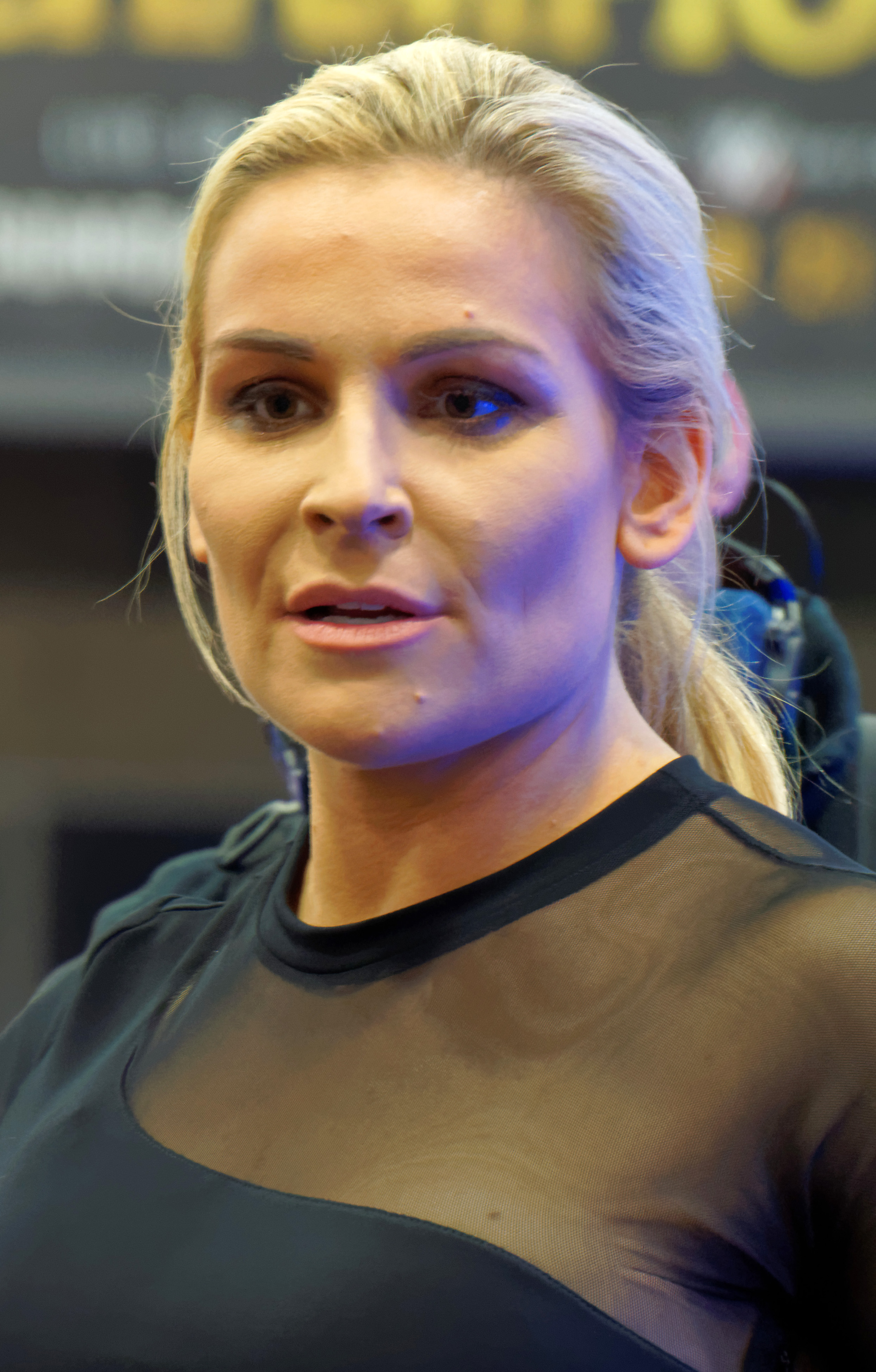
- Natalya in 2016

Personal information
- Born: Natalie Katherine Neidhart; May 27, 1982 (age 44) Calgary, Alberta, Canada
- Spouse: Tyson Kidd (m. 2013)
- Parent: Jim Neidhart (father)
- Relatives: Bret Hart (uncle); Owen Hart (uncle)
- Family: Hart

Professional wrestling career
- Ring name(s): Nadia Hart; Natalya; Natalya Neidhart; Nattie Neidhart; Natalie Neidhart; Nattie
- Billed height: 5 ft 5 in (165 cm)
- Billed weight: 135 lb (61 kg)
- Billed from: Calgary, Alberta, Canada
- Trained by: Bruce Hart; Clive Lewellin; Ross Hart; Tokyo Joe; Tyson Kidd
- Debut: 2000

Natalie Katherine Neidhart-Wilson (née Neidhart; born May 27, 1982) is a Canadian professional wrestler. She is signed to WWE, under the ring name Nattie. She also wrestles on the independent circuit – predominantly for Game Changer Wrestling (GCW) during their Bloodsport events – under her real name (stylized as Nattie Neidhart). She is a two-time women's champion, having won the WWE Divas Championship and WWE SmackDown Women's Championship once each. She is also a former one-time WWE Women's Tag Team Champion (with Tamina).

A third generation wrestler, Neidhart is a member of the Hart wrestling family through her mother, and is also the daughter of Hart Foundation member and Hall of Famer Jim Neidhart. She trained in the Hart family Dungeon under the tutelage of her uncles Ross and Bruce Hart. From 2000 to 2001, she worked for the Matrats promotion, before debuting for Stampede Wrestling in 2003. In 2004 and 2005, she wrestled abroad in England and Japan. She became the inaugural Stampede Women's Pacific Champion in 2005, and won the SuperGirls Championship the following year.

In 2007, Neidhart signed with WWE and spent time in Deep South Wrestling (DSW), Ohio Valley Wrestling (OVW), and Florida Championship Wrestling (FCW) developmental territories. While in FCW, she managed her cousin, Harry Smith, and her husband, T.J. Wilson. She debuted on the main roster in 2008, allying herself with Victoria. The following year, she and Wilson were joined by Smith to form The Hart Dynasty. In 2010, Neidhart won the Divas Championship. In 2017, she became the SmackDown Women's Champion after defeating Naomi at SummerSlam. She is the first woman in WWE history to hold both the Divas Championship and the SmackDown Women's Championship.

From 2013 to 2019, Neidhart appeared in the reality television series Total Divas, the sole consistent main cast member across all nine seasons. She has set six records as recognized by the Guinness Book of World Records for female WWE wrestlers – most pay-per-view appearances, most matches, most wins, most Raw matches, most SmackDown matches, and most WrestleMania matches. Neidhart is the longest-tenured female WWE wrestler, actively wrestling with the company since 2007.

== Early life ==
Natalie Katherine Neidhart was born on May 27, 1982, in Calgary, Alberta, Canada. Neidhart is the daughter of wrestler Jim "The Anvil" Neidhart and Elizabeth "Ellie" Hart, a daughter of Stu Hart, making Neidhart a third generation wrestler. She has two sisters; her older sister, Jennifer, is a gourmet chef and caterer, and Kristen (nicknamed "Muffy") is her younger sister. She is of Greek descent through a maternal great-grandmother. Neidhart cites her grandfather, Stu, and her uncle, Bret, as her inspirations, both in and out of the ring. As a member of the Hart wrestling family, she is a cousin to Harry Smith, Teddy, Matt, and Mike Hart, who are all also professional wrestlers. She is close friends with Harry Smith, and the two lived together for a short time as children while their fathers were wrestling as a team, The Hart Foundation.

Neidhart attended Vincent Massey Junior High School and Bishop Carroll High School, from which she graduated in 2000. Neidhart is trained in Jiu-Jitsu and amateur wrestling, and also participated in dance and gymnastics. She briefly worked as a saleswoman for Kirby vacuums when she was eighteen.

Neidhart received formal professional wrestling training in the Hart family "Dungeon" from her uncles Ross and Bruce Hart, becoming the first and only woman to do so. In addition to her professional wrestling career, Neidhart has received training in amateur wrestling and mixed martial arts.

== Professional wrestling career ==
=== Training and early career (2000–2007) ===
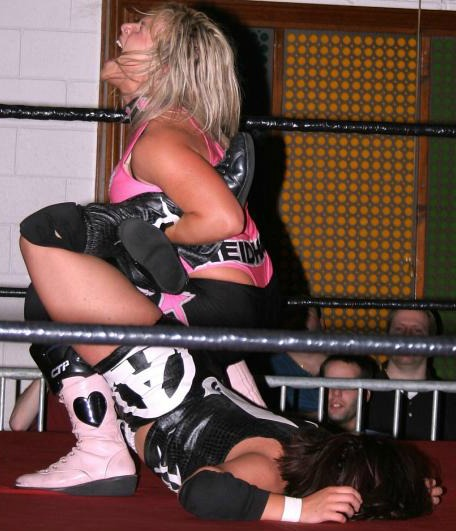
Neidhart during her early wrestling days, performing the Sharpshooter in 2006.

In late 2000 through 2001, she served as the host and ring announcer of the Eric Bischoff led youth-promotion MatRats.

In 2003, she began working for the Hart Family's own promotion, Stampede Wrestling under the name Nattie Neidhart, beginning a long time feud with Belle Lovitz. The pair wrestled each other repeatedly, including a match for the Prairie Wrestling Alliance, where Neidhart teamed with her father, Jim "The Anvil" Neidhart, against Lovitz and Apocalypse. In 2004, however, Neidhart and Lovitz formed a tag team, wrestling several intergender matches against The Meyers Brothers as well as against Anna and Ma Myers.

In mid-2004, she began accepting bookings for a tour in England, and in March 2005, started on a two-month tour of Japan where she used the name Nadia Hart. When she returned to Canada she promptly turned into a villainous character, labeling herself "Nasty Nattie". On June 17, 2005, she defeated Anna Marie, Lovitz, and Ma Myers in a four-way match to become the first Stampede Women's Pacific Champion, though she later vacated the championship. In November 2005, Neidhart damaged her cruciate ligament while wrestling in Japan, and underwent surgery in early 2006. She was sidelined for six months while she recovered.

On October 8, 2006, Neidhart won the SuperGirls Championship from Lisa Moretti at a Big Time Wrestling show held by NWA: Extreme Canadian Championship Wrestling in Newark, California. She held the championship for 19 days, before losing it to Nikki Matthews on October 27 in Surrey, British Columbia. Also in October 2006, she debuted in the all-female promotion, Shimmer Women Athletes. She lost to Sara Del Rey at the tapings of Volume 7, but defeated "The Portuguese Princess" Ariel at the Volume 8 tapings.

The following month she competed in the tournament to determine Great Canadian Wrestling's inaugural W.I.L.D. Champion, and defeated Danyah and Aurora en route to the final, where she lost to Sirelda. She had her last match for Stampede Wrestling on January 26, 2007, after she had signed with World Wrestling Entertainment (WWE), defeating Veronika Vice. During the show, she also delivered a speech thanking the fans for their support.

=== WWE ===
==== Developmental territories (2007–2008) ====
On January 5, 2007, Neidhart signed a contract with WWE. Upon signing she was assigned to their developmental territory Deep South Wrestling for the first half of the year, competing against wrestlers including Krissy Vaine and Angel Williams. She was briefly transferred to Florida Championship Wrestling when it opened in June, and then moved to Ohio Valley Wrestling (OVW), debuting in a dark match at the television tapings on July 18, 2007, where she won a battle royal. She debuted the next week as a member of the Next Generation Hart Foundation, accompanying her cousins Teddy Hart and Harry Smith for tag team matches. In September, she and the rest of the Hart Foundation were moved back to FCW. Initially, Neidhart formed an alliance with Victoria Crawford to take on The Bella Twins (Nikki and Brie Bella), but in 2008, the pair began competing against one another, either in singles matches or in tag team matches with various partners. She continued to make appearances in FCW in late 2008, after debuting on SmackDown, and managed TJ Wilson and DH Smith (Harry Smith) to the FCW Florida Tag Team Championship on October 30.

==== Alliance with Victoria (2008–2009) ====
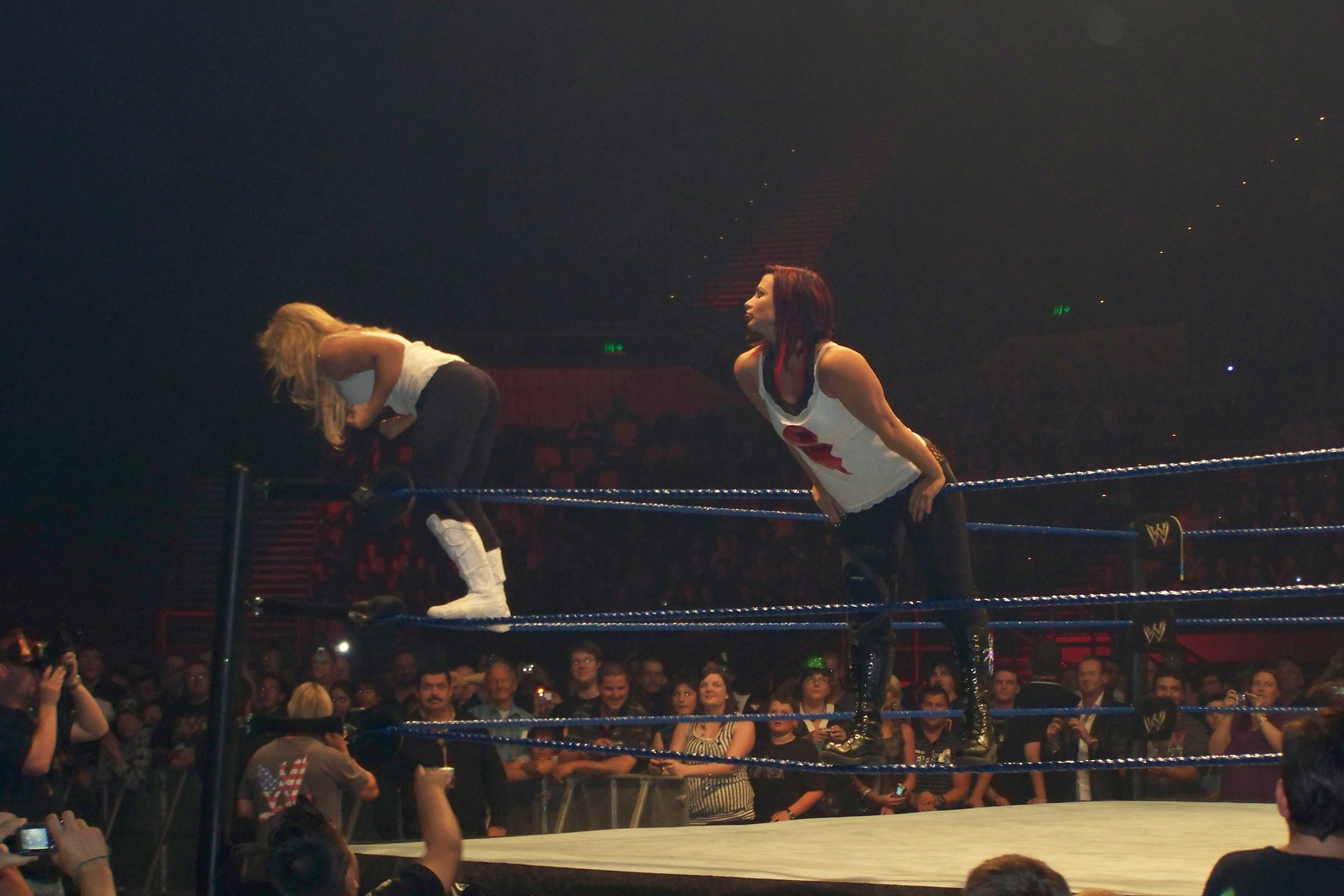
Natalya (left) along with Victoria (on ropes) during a house show in 2008

On the April 4 episode of SmackDown she made her main roster debut, as a villainous character, when she came out of the crowd to aid Victoria in an attack against McCool and Cherry, forming an alliance with her in the process. On the April 11, 2008, episode of SmackDown!, she introduced herself as the daughter of Jim Neidhart under the name Natalya Neidhart, accompanying Victoria to her match against Michelle McCool. Two weeks later on SmackDown she made her televised in-ring debut, under the shortened ring name Natalya, defeating Cherry with her uncle's submission move the "sharpshooter". At the Backlash pay–per–view on April 27 Natalya teamed up with Victoria, Beth Phoenix, Jillian Hall, Layla and Melina to defeat Mickie James, Maria Kanellis, Ashley, Michelle McCool, Cherry and Kelly Kelly in a 12-Diva tag team match. On the May 2 episode of SmackDown, Victoria and Natalya defeated McCool and Cherry. On the June 6 episode of SmackDown, SmackDown General Manager Vickie Guerrero introduced the Divas Championship, and that same night the Divas competed in a Golden Dreams match to qualify for the championship match at The Great American Bash. Natalya won and advanced to the Bash, but lost the Championship match to Michelle McCool.

Natalya and Victoria started a feud with the debuting Brie Bella, after Victoria lost to her on the August 29 episode of SmackDown. On the September 26 episode of SmackDown, Victoria and Natalya lost to Maria and Brie. On the October 31 episode of SmackDown, Natalya teamed up with Victoria and Maryse during a Divas Halloween costume tag team match in a losing effort to Michelle McCool, Maria and Brie. On the November 7 episode of SmackDown, Natalya accompanied Victoria to her match against Brie, where she was once again defeated. Post-match, Brie ran under the ring to escape from Natalya and Victoria, but they both reached under the ring for her, pulling her and Nicole out. The twins then attacked them and celebrated afterward. On the November 21 episode of SmackDown, Victoria teamed up with Natalya in a losing effort to The Bella Twins. At Survivor Series (2008), Natalya competed in a 5-on-5 Survivor Series elimination match a part of Team Smackdown where her team lost to Team Raw. On the November 28 episode of SmackDown, Victoria teamed up with Natalya and Maryse to defeat the Bella Twins and Michelle McCool, before the feud ended. Followed this, her association with Victoria also ended after she retired from the company on the January 16, 2009, episode of SmackDown. at Armageddon (2008), Natalya, Jillian Hall, Victoria and Maryse lost to Maria, Kelly Kelly, Mickie James, and Michelle McCool in an Eight-Diva Santa's Little Helper tag team match.

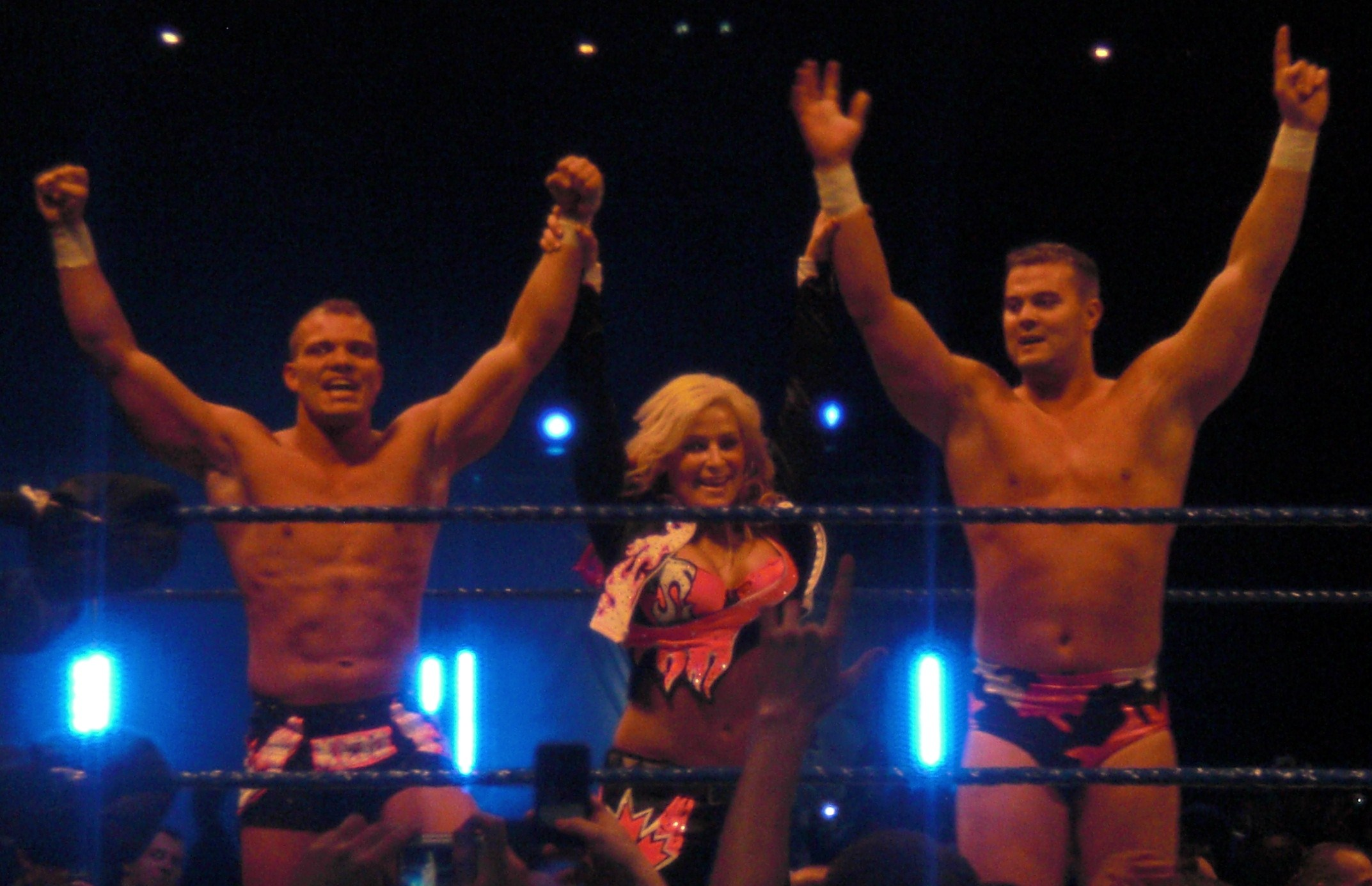
Natalya (center) along the other members of The Hart Dynasty, Tyson Kidd (left) and David Hart Smith in 2010

==== The Hart Dynasty (2009–2010) ====
While still a member of the SmackDown brand, she made her debut for the ECW brand, via the talent exchange agreement, on February 10, 2009, managing her real life boyfriend Tyson Kidd (TJ Wilson). In her ECW in-ring debut, on the March 3 episode, Natalya defeated Alicia Fox. On April 5, Neidhart made her WrestleMania debut, competing in a Divas battle royal at WrestleMania XXV, but the match was won by Santina Marella. On April 15 Natalya was made an official member of the ECW brand, when she was drafted there as part of the 2009 Supplemental Draft. On the May 13 episode of ECW, Kidd and Natalya were joined by her real-life cousin David Hart Smith, forming The Hart Dynasty, although it was originally called The Hart Trilogy.

On June 29, 2009, Natalya was traded back to SmackDown along with the other members of The Hart Dynasty. Natalya's first match back for the brand was in a six-person mixed tag team match on the July 17 episode, when The Hart Dynasty defeated Cryme Tyme (JTG and Shad Gaspard) and Eve Torres. Natalya, Kidd, and Smith went on to feud with Torres and Cryme Tyme, with Natalya also facing Torres in singles matches and tag team matches involving other Divas. Natalya was on the winning team when the SmackDown Divas defeated the Raw Divas at the Bragging Rights pay-per-view in October. On December 4, Natalya lost in a triple threat match to determine to number one contender for the WWE Women's Championship after she was pinned by Mickie James. The match also involved Beth Phoenix.

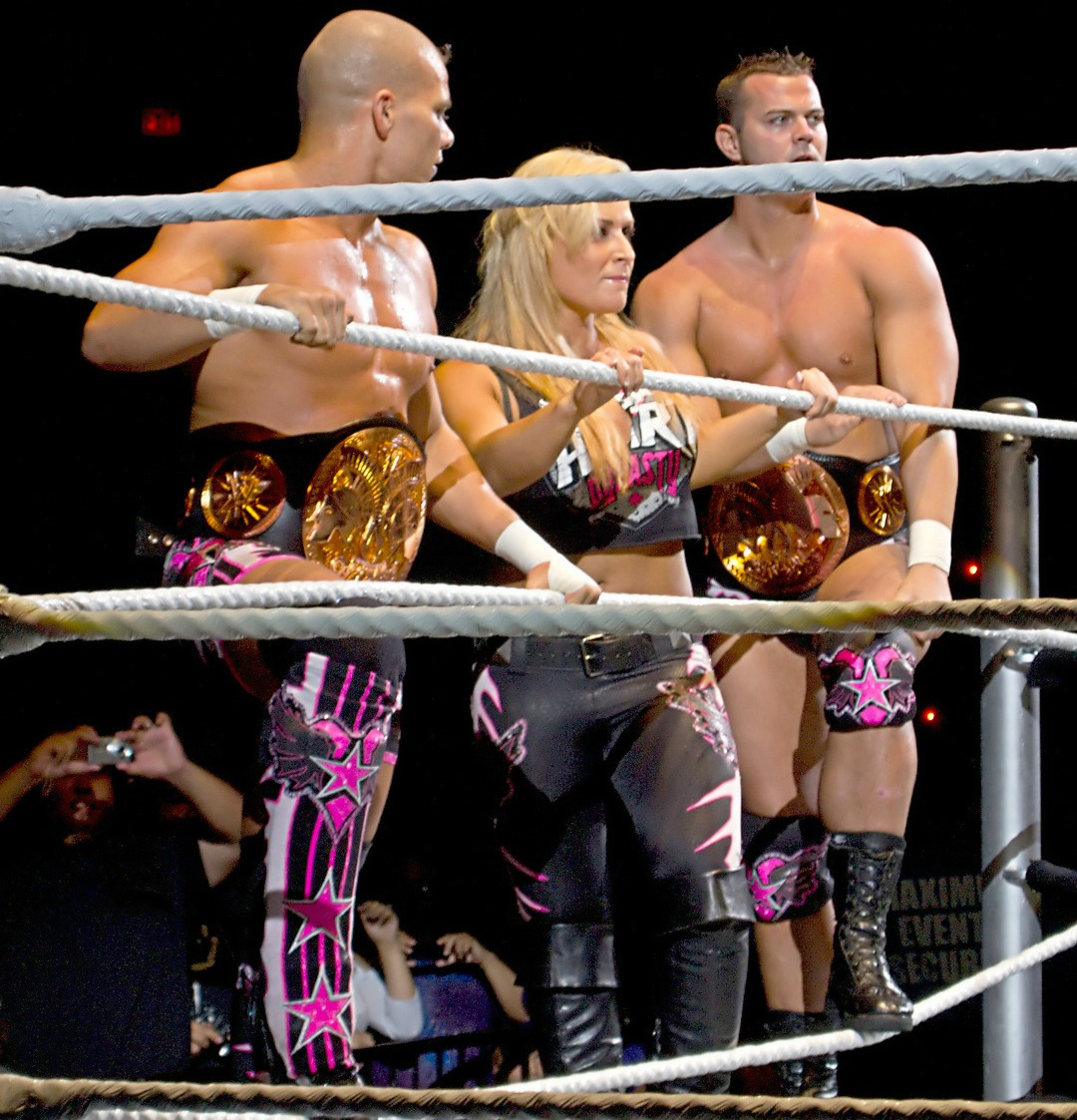
Natalya (center) along the other members of The Hart Dynasty, Tyson Kidd (left) and David Hart Smith in 2010

Natalya, along with the other Hart Dynasty members, appeared at WrestleMania XXVI, helping her uncle Bret Hart during his match against Vince McMahon, turning them into faces as a result. On April 26, The Hart Dynasty won the Unified WWE Tag Team Championship from The Miz and The Big Show. The following day, as part of the 2010 WWE Supplemental Draft, Natalya was drafted to the Raw brand, along with Kidd and Smith. On the May 24, 2010, episode of Raw, all three members of The Hart Dynasty were attacked by The Usos (Jimmy and Jey Uso) and Tamina, who were making their debuts. This provoked a feud between the trios, with The Hart Dynasty attacking The Usos and Tamina the following week in retaliation. At the Fatal 4-Way pay-per-view in June, Natalya and The Hart Dynasty defeated Tamina and The Uso brothers in a six-person mixed tag team match, when Natalya pinned Tamina following a discus clothesline. At the next pay-per-view, Money in the Bank, Natalya helped The Hart Dynasty to retain the championship against The Usos by stopping Tamina from interfering in the match, ending the feud. In September, at Night of Champions, The Hart Dynasty lost the Tag Team Championship in a Tag Team Turmoil match. After a failed attempt to regain the championship, in which Kidd was pushed off balance during their double-team Hart Attack move, Kidd and Smith began to have a falling out with one another.

This culminated on the November 15 episode of Raw, when Kidd refused to tag in and attacked Smith during a match for the WWE Tag Team Championship against The Nexus (Justin Gabriel and Heath Slater), resulting in Kidd became a heel once again. Smith defeated Kidd in a singles match on the November 25 episode of WWE Superstars. Afterward, Smith offered to shake Kidd's hand, but Kidd refused and instead slapped him across the face. On the following episode of Raw, Kidd defeated Smith in a rematch, with this officially ending the alliance as a team.

==== Divas Champion (2010–2011) ====
Natalya started her singles competition run, on the September 27 episode of Raw, when she won a battle royal to become the number one contender to the WWE Unified Divas Championship, and began feuding with self-professed co-Divas Champions Lay-Cool (Michelle McCool and Layla). At the Hell in a Cell pay-per-view on October 3, she defeated Michelle McCool via disqualification in a match for the championship, which meant that McCool retained the championship. She received another championship match three weeks later at the Bragging Rights pay-per-view, where she lost to Layla after McCool interfered. On November 1, she once again became number one contender to the Unified Divas Championship after defeating McCool in a non-title match.

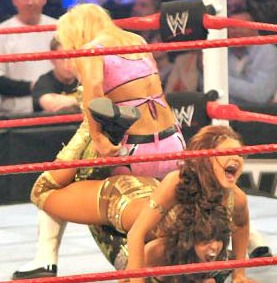
Natalya applying a double sharpshooter on Eve Torres and Layla at the 2011 Royal Rumble event

At the Survivor Series pay-per-view on November 21, Natalya defeated McCool and Layla in a two-on-one handicap match to win the WWE Divas Championship for the first time. After the match she was attacked by Lay-Cool until Beth Phoenix came to her aid, with the pair forming an alliance. At the TLC: Tables, Ladders & Chairs pay-per-view in December, Natalya and Phoenix defeated Lay-Cool in the first Diva's Tag Team Tables match in WWE history. Natalya was scheduled to defend her championship against Lay-Cool in a two-on-one handicap match at the Royal Rumble, but the match was changed to a fatal four-way, also involving Eve. Eve went on to pin Layla and become the new Divas Champion ending Natalya's reign at 70 days.

On April 2, Natalya, alongside the entire roster of WWE Divas, inducted Sunny into the Hall of Fame. On April 26, Natalya was drafted back to the SmackDown brand as part of the 2011 supplemental draft. In her return match for the brand, she unsuccessfully challenged Brie Bella for the Divas Championship. In May, Natalya began acting as the on-screen mentor to The Chickbusters of AJ and Kaitlyn, giving them advice and managing them during their matches. Natalya, AJ, and Kaitlyn feuded with Alicia Fox, Tamina, and Rosa Mendes throughout 2011.

==== The Divas of Doom (2011–2012) ====
On the August 1, 2011, episode of Raw, she competed in a battle royal to determinate the number one contender to Kelly Kelly's Divas Championship at SummerSlam, which was won by Beth Phoenix. Post-match, she turned villainous by attacking Kelly, and stating "[her] days as the perky, cute, blonde little bimbo were officially over", four days later on SmackDown, Natalya defeated AJ before turning on her protégé, attacking her and declaring war on the "perky little princesses" that comprised the rest of the Divas division. As part of the storyline, she aligned herself with Phoenix, and the pair dubbed themselves "The Divas of Doom", defeating The Chickbusters the following week. Throughout September, The Divas of Doom feuded with The Chickbusters on SmackDown, while feuding with Kelly Kelly and Eve Torres on Raw.

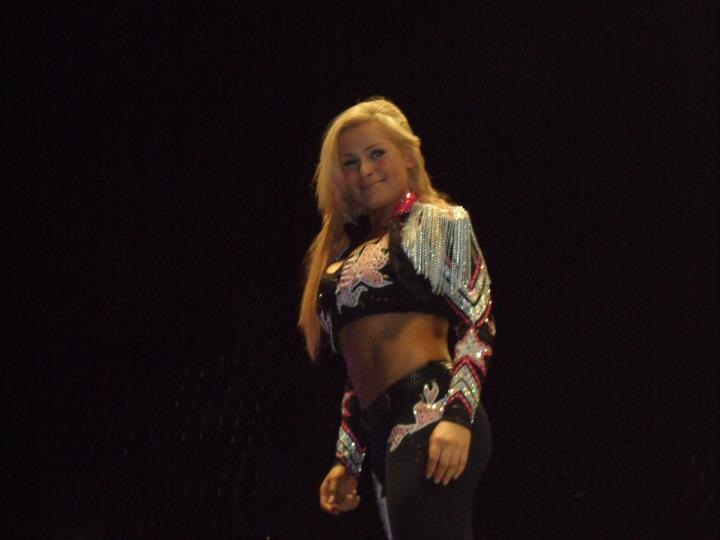
Natalya during a house show in 2011

Natalya accompanied Phoenix to her Divas Championship match at the SummerSlam pay-per-view against Kelly Kelly, who was accompanied by Eve Torres, but she failed to win the match. On the September 19 episode of Raw, the Divas of Doom lost a tag team match to Kelly and Torres after Eve pinned Natalya for the win. On the September 26 episode of Raw, Phoenix pinned Kelly Kelly in a tag team match and granted her a new match for Kelly's WWE Divas Championship. Four days later on SmackDown, Natalya lost a match to Kelly. Post-match, Phoenix jumped into the ring and delivered a 'Glam Slam' on Kelly, then Natalya applied and debuted their new submission manoeuvre the 'Pin-Up Strong'. Phoenix received her title match against Kelly on October 2 at Hell in a Cell, which she won, with Natalya's help, to become a one–time WWE Divas Champion. Phoenix successfully defended her title against Eve Torres, on two different occasions, at Vengeance, on October 23, in which Natalya was banned from ringside after she and Phoenix had attacked Torres and Kelly at backstage, and at Survivor Series, on November 20, during a Divas lumberjack match.

Through November, the Divas of Doom started a winning streak over "The Chickbusters" (AJ and Kaitlyn), after defeating them in both tag team and singles matches, with Kaitlyn beginning to display villainous traits, due to her being upset at AJ over the defeats. On the December 6 SmackDown tapings, the Divas of Doom defeated The Chickbusters once again. Post match, Kaitlyn solidified her heel turn after joining the Divas of Doom, however the segment was cut from the broadcast and not recognized by WWE.

In early 2012, Natalya was characterized as being notable for smelly flatulence; this character development was heavily panned by critics.

On January 29, at Royal Rumble, the Divas of Doom competed in an eight-woman tag team match alongside the Bella Twins, and defeated the team of Eve Torres, Kelly Kelly, Alicia Fox, and Tamina. The next night on Raw, Phoenix successfully defended her Divas Championship against Eve. At the Elimination Chamber pay-per-view, Phoenix successfully defended her championship against Tamina, in a point where her association with Phoenix started splitting up, and on the March 22 episode of Superstars, Phoenix teamed with Eve Torres against Natalya and Tamina, in a losing effort, with this effectively ensuring the ending for the team.

==== NXT and Total Divas storylines (2012–2014) ====
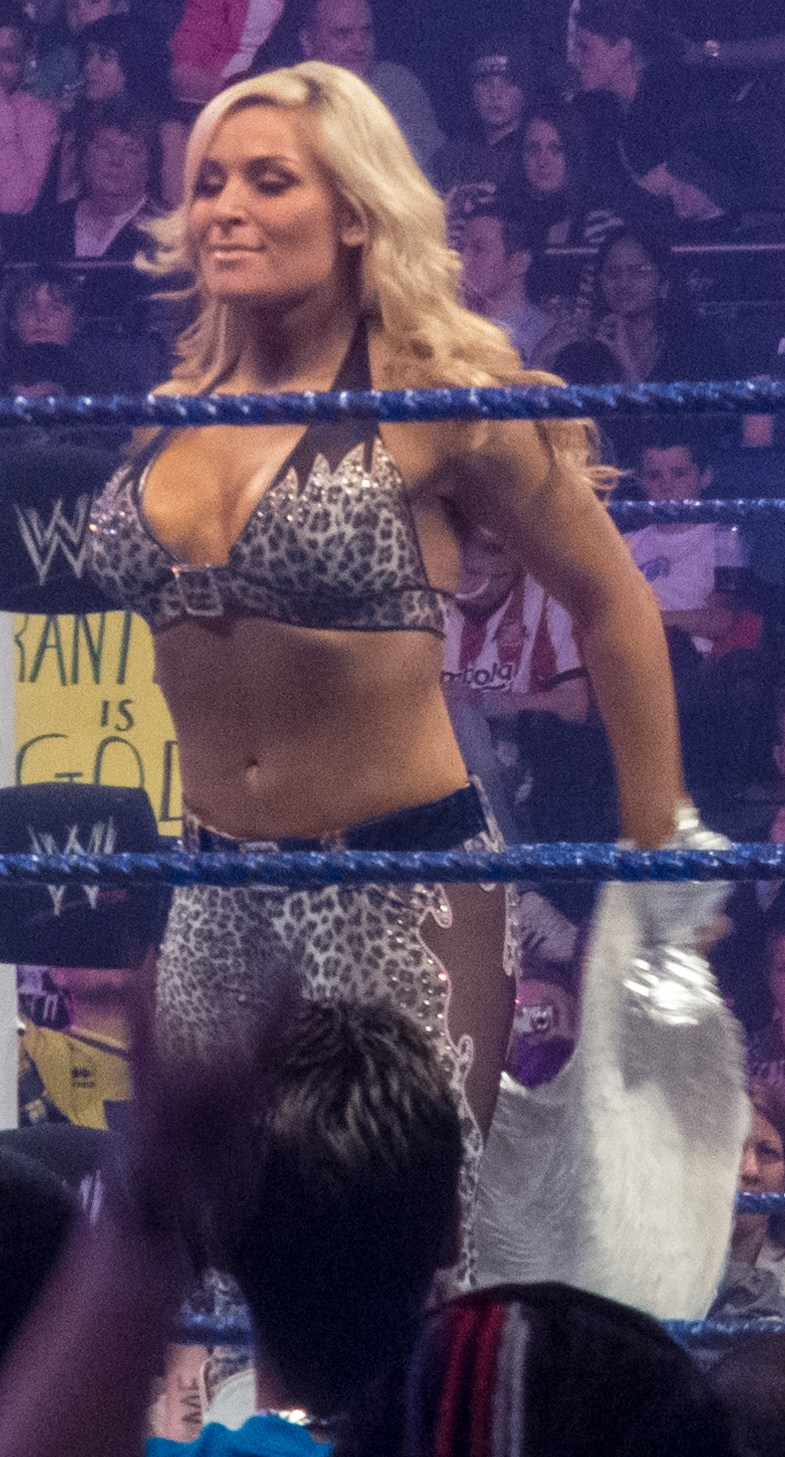
Natalya before a match on SmackDown in April 2012

Beginning in April, while on NXT Redemption, Natalya became allied with former Hart Dynasty partner Tyson Kidd again, and started feuding with former protégé Kaitlyn when she felt Kaitlyn was paying Kidd too much attention. The pair faced off in both singles and tag team competition throughout mid-2012, including being on opposite sides of a six-Diva tag team match at Money in the Bank, which Natalya's team lost. Their feud ended on August 31, when Natalya lost to Kaitlyn in a singles match on SmackDown. In November, Natalya began an on-screen relationship with The Great Khali. The following month, Natalya saved Hornswoggle from an attack by Rosa Mendes, thus turning face in the process. This led to a feud with Natalya, Khali, and Hornswoggle facing off against Mendes and her allies, Primo and Epico in mixed tag team matches in early 2013. On the March 27 episode of NXT, Natalya lost a Divas Championship match to champion Kaitlyn.

Upon the debut of the Total Divas reality television program in July 2013, Natalya began feuding with fellow co–stars on the show, The Bella Twins. Natalya and Brie Bella went on to trade victories in singles matches on Raw and at SummerSlam. The cast of Total Divas then transitioned into a feud with AJ Lee, the WWE Divas Champion, who ridiculed the cast and the show. This resulted in a four-way match at Night of Champions in September, where AJ successfully retained the title against Natalya, Brie, and Naomi. Simultaneously, Natalya continued appearing alongside long–time ally The Great Khali, and the two began a feud with Fandango and the debúting Summer Rae, which led to a mixed tag team match at the Hell in a Cell pay–per–view, which Natalya and Khali lost. After forcing AJ to submit on the November 1 episode of SmackDown during a tag team match, Natalya unsuccessfully challenged AJ for the Divas Championship on WWE Main Event two weeks later. At Survivor Series, the cast of Total Divas faced off with a team led by AJ and Natalya and Nikki Bella were the sole survivors in the match. In December, Natalya unsuccessfully challenged Paige for the NXT Women's Championship. After pinning AJ again in a tag team match on Raw, Natalya was named number one contender to the WWE Divas Championship, but failed to capture the title at Tables, Ladders and Chairs.

On April 6, 2014, Natalya competed at WrestleMania XXX in the 14–Diva "Vickie Guerrero Invitational match" for the WWE Divas Championship, which was won by the defending champion AJ Lee. In May, Natalya was entered into a tournament to determine the new NXT Women's Champion. She defeated Layla and Sasha Banks en route to the final at NXT TakeOver, in which she lost to Charlotte. Throughout September, Natalya started acting as the on-screen mentor for Rosa Mendes, starting a feud against "The Slayers" (Summer Rae and Layla). They faced off against them during the Main Event and Smackdown shows, losing both tag matches due to miscommunication as a team. Additionally they also faced off against AJ Lee and Paige on the September 8, episode of Raw, once again in a losing effort. On the September 29, episode of Raw, Natalya and Tyson Kidd accompanied Mendes to her match against Layla, in which she was defeated, followed this her association with Mendes quietly disbanded. On November 23, Natalya took part of Alicia Fox's team at Survivor Series, which was victorious in a clean sweep.

==== Managing Tyson Kidd and Cesaro (2014–2015) ====
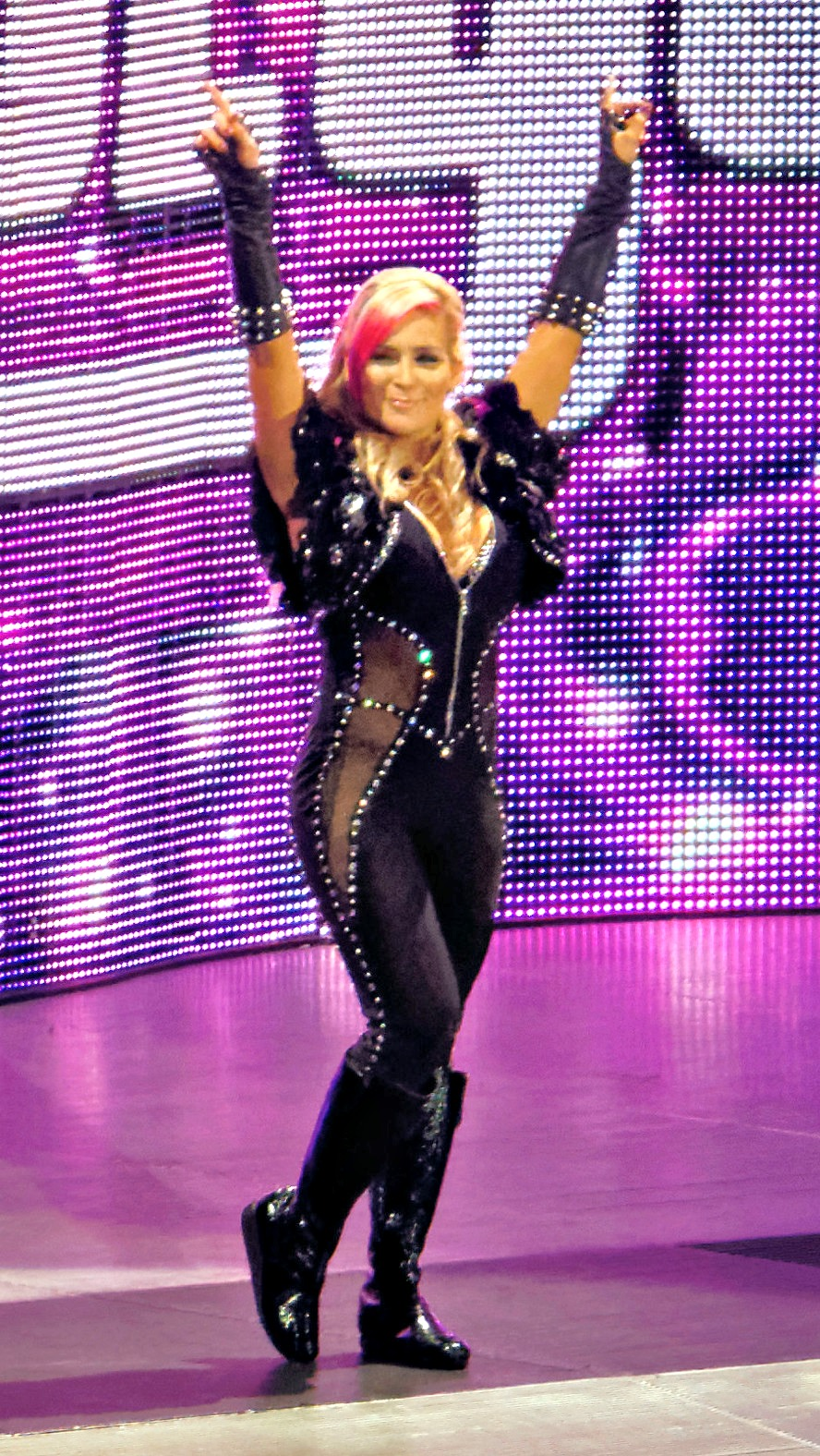
Natalya before a match on Raw in March 2015

In mid–2014, Natalya entered a storyline with her real–life husband Tyson Kidd, in which their relationship was openly acknowledged on-screen. She regularly accompanied Kidd to the ring, where he often used her as a distraction to win his matches. The storyline would continue followed Total Divas footage, in which Kidd transitioned into a disrespectful angle against Natalya, this part of the storyline was done in order to use the marriage problems they both had.

On the January 5, 2015, episode of Raw, after Natalya defeated WWE Divas Champion Nikki Bella in a non–title match, Brie and Nikki would attack Natalya, with Paige making the save. This led to a tag team match at Royal Rumble between the two teams, with The Bella Twins picking up the win. Through February, Natalya and Kidd started a brief feud against Naomi and Jimmy Uso, facing off during an intergender tag team match on the February 16, episode of Raw, which Natalya and Kidd lost. When Kidd allied himself with Cesaro, Natalya began managing the team and was by their side in February, when they won the WWE Tag Team Championship's at Fastlane. The following night on Raw, Natalya helped the duo retain the titles against The Usos, turning heel in the process. On the February 26 episode of Smackdown, the villainous Natalya defeated Naomi in a singles match, before the feud ended. On March 28, Natalya inducted Alundra Blayze into the WWE Hall of Fame. On March 29, she accompanied Kidd and Cesaro during the WrestleMania 31 kick-off show, in which they successfully retained the Tag Team Championships.

Natalya lasted the rest of the year competing in various matches, including a number one contender's battle royal for Nikki Bella's Divas Championship, on the April 13 episode of Raw, which was won by Paige. On the April 9 episode of Smackdown, Natalya defeated Alicia Fox. Post-match, she and Fox were attacked by the special guest referee for the match Cameron, which would lead to a triple–threat match the following week, with Cameron coming out victorious. During a dark match on the June 1 episode of Raw, Kidd had suffered a severe neck/spinal injury after receiving Samoa Joe's 'Muscle buster' finishing maneuver. Several weeks later, Kidd stated that he would be out of action for over a year, with Natalya taken off television for the very first time in order to care for Kidd.

==== Women's Revolution (2015–2016) ====
After a three-month absence from television, Natalya returned on the September 21, 2015, episode of Raw, as a face, confronting the villainous Paige over her actions during Charlotte's WWE Divas Championship celebration. Later that evening, she was defeated by Naomi in a singles match. After multiple confrontations between the two, Natalya would defeat Paige on the October 5 episode of Raw. Three days later, on SmackDown, Natalya teamed with Becky Lynch and Charlotte the three defeated Team Bella (Alicia Fox, Brie Bella, and Nikki Bella). On the October 15 episode of Smackdown, while Paige saved Charlotte and Becky from an attack by Team Bella, Natalya, after a backstage altercation with Paige, would be attacked. In the end of October, Natalya started a feud with Team B.A.D. (Naomi, Tamina and Sasha Banks), after the three distracted her during her match with Paige, and attacked her, but Natalya went on to gain revenge over the team by defeating Naomi and Tamina in two singles matches before the feud quietly ended.

In January 2016, Natalya revealed that she had been working through a broken ankle, which was mistaken for a simple sprain and after two months of inactivity, she made her official return during a live event on January 3. Few weeks later, Natalya returned to WWE television, on the January 18 episode of Raw, where she defeated Brie Bella, with her former rival Paige in her corner. Upon her return, Natalya started competing in various singles and tag team matches, ending on both winning and losing sides. On March 12, at Roadblock, Natalya unsuccessfully challenged Charlotte for the Divas Championship.

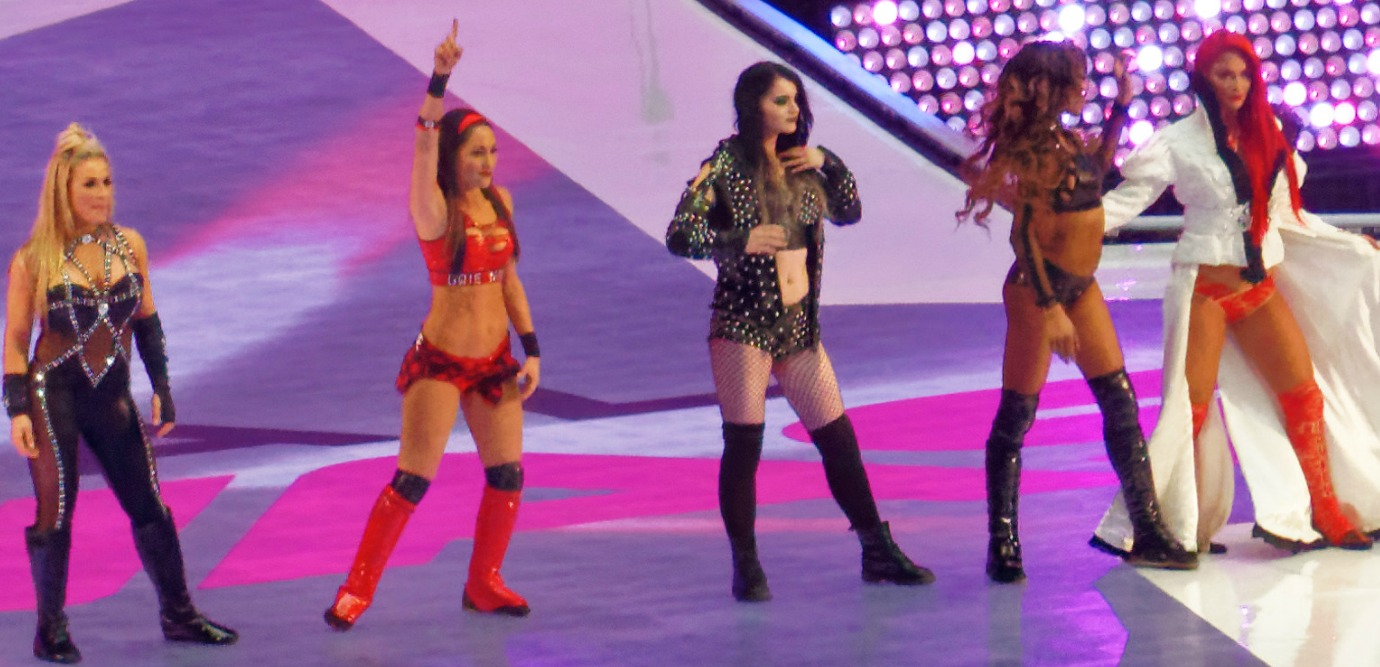
Natalya (far left) performing her entrance with her Total Divas co-stars at WrestleMania 32 in April 2016

On the March 22 episode of Main Event, alongside Alicia Fox she accompanied Paige to her match against Naomi, accompanied by Tamina and Lana. Later in the match, she and Fox were viciously attacked by Summer Rae and a returning Emma, distracting Paige as they aligned themselves with Lana and Team B.A.D. The following week, she along with Brie Bella and Alicia Fox accompanied Paige to her match against Emma on the March 28 episode of Raw, where she was defeated after Lana attacked Paige. Post-match, she along her allies were attacked by Emma, Summer Rae, Lana, Tamina and Naomi, before they were saved by a returning Eva Marie. As a result, Natalya's Total Divas team (also including Brie, Alicia Fox, Eva Marie and Paige) faced the newly dubbed team B.A.D. & Blonde (Naomi, Tamina, Lana, Emma, and Summer Rae) in a 10-Diva tag team match at WrestleMania 32's pre-show. Natalya's team won after Naomi submitted to Brie Bella. After confronting Charlotte during her championship celebration the following night, she challenged Charlotte to a championship match on the April 11 episode of Raw, in which she was unsuccessful in capturing the WWE Women's Championship. On the April 18 episode of Raw, Natalya confronted Charlotte during an interview and revealed that Shane McMahon had booked them in a rematch for the Women's Championship at Payback and that her uncle Bret Hart will be at her corner. At the event, she was defeated after match referee Charles Robinson, ended the match as Charlotte held her in the Sharpshooter submission hold, Natalya's signature finishing move, even though she had not submitted making reference to the infamous "shoot screwjob" the Montreal Screwjob. After the match, both Natalya and Hart applied their finishing maneuver the "Sharpshooter" on Charlotte and Ric Flair. The following month at the Extreme Rules pay-per-view, she was once again defeated by Charlotte in a submission match in which Ric Flair was banned from ringside, however, she was helped by Dana Brooke while dressed as Flair allowing Charlotte to get the victory.

On June 19 at Money In The Bank, Natalya teamed with Becky Lynch in a losing effort against Charlotte and Dana Brooke. After the match, Natalya attacked Becky, turning into a villainess for the first time since 2012. Followed by multiple continuous attacks between both girls, Natalya defeated Becky in a match at Battleground.

==== SmackDown Women's Champion (2016–2018) ====
On July 19, Natalya was drafted to SmackDown as part of the 2016 WWE draft. She made her first appearance for the brand on the July 26 episode of SmackDown, losing against Becky Lynch. On the August 9 episode of SmackDown, Natalya competed in a losing effort against Carmella. The following week, Natalya teamed with Alexa Bliss in a losing effort against the team of Carmella, and Becky Lynch, after a distraction provided by Eva Marie and Naomi. At SummerSlam, Natalya teamed with Alexa Bliss and the returning Nikki Bella (who replaced the suspended Eva Marie) against Naomi, Lynch, and Carmella in a six-woman tag team match. Nikki Bella pinned Carmella to score the victory for Natalya's team. At Backlash, Natalya competed in a six-pack elimination challenge to determine the inaugural SmackDown Women's Champion and was eliminated by Nikki Bella.

On the October 25 episode of SmackDown, Natalya lost against Nikki Bella in a match to determine the captain of the SmackDown women's team at the Survivor Series pay-per-view. However, after Nikki had been attacked backstage before the match, Natalya replaced Nikki but led her team to defeat. At the TLC pay-per-view, Carmella accused Natalya of having been Nikki's attacker at Survivor Series; Natalya denied this for weeks before attacking Carmella on the December 20 episode of SmackDown and admitting to having attacked Nikki, revealing her pent-up jealousy of Bella's success over the years. Natalya and Nikki were set to compete in a match on the January 10, 2017, episode of SmackDown, but the match never officially started due a brawl between the two, where referees came in to break them up. At the Royal Rumble pay-per-view on January 29, Natalya competed in a six-woman tag team match alongside Alexa Bliss and Mickie James against Nikki, Naomi, and Becky Lynch, where her team was defeated after Naomi pinned Bliss. On February 12 at the Elimination Chamber pay-per-view, Natalya faced Nikki in singles competition, which ended in a double count-out. The feud culminated in a Falls Count Anywhere match on the February 21 episode of SmackDown, in which Natalya was victorious after an interference from Maryse. On June 18 at Money in the Bank, Natalya competed in the inaugural women's Money in the Bank ladder match, which was won by Carmella following an interference by James Ellsworth.

On July 23, Natalya defeated Flair, Lynch, Tamina, and Lana in a five-way elimination match at Battleground, earning an opportunity to face Naomi for the SmackDown Women's Championship at SummerSlam on August 20. At the event, Natalya defeated Naomi to capture the SmackDown Women's Championship. With this victory, Natalya became the first woman to hold both the Divas Championship and the SmackDown Women's Championship. On the September 12 episode of SmackDown, Natalya made her first successful title defense in a rematch against Naomi. At Hell in a Cell on October 8, Natalya defended her championship against Charlotte Flair, which resulted into a disqualification loss after she attacked Flair with a chair. On November 14 episode of SmackDown, she dropped the title to Charlotte, losing by submission, and thereby ending her reign at 86 days. Natalya then competed at Survivor Series along with Becky Lynch, Tamina Snuka, Naomi and Carmella as a part of Team Smackdown against Team Raw in a losing effort. Natalya received her Smackdown Women's Championship rematch at Clash of Champions, but was unsuccessful against Flair in a lumberjack match.

At the 2018 Royal Rumble, Natalya participated in the first Women's Royal Rumble Match; she entered at number 18 but was eliminated by Trish Stratus. At Fastlane, Carmella and Natalya defeated Naomi and Becky Lynch after Carmella pinned Becky.

==== Alliance with Ronda Rousey (2018–2019) ====
On the April 16, 2018, episode of Raw, Natalya was once again drafted to Raw and became a fan favorite for the first time since June 2016. In her first match, she defeated Mandy Rose, but after the match, both Rose and Sonya Deville attacked her before Ronda Rousey made the save. Shortly after that scene, Natalya was placed in a storyline with Rousey as she was revealed to be her training partner and friend. In June, Natalya competed in the Money in the Bank ladder match for the third time in her career, however, at the event, the match was ultimately won by Alexa Bliss. Throughout the following months, Natalya continued to compete in various singles and tag team matches and also worked as a manager for both Nia Jax and Ronda Rousey in some of their matches against Alexa Bliss to avoid Mickie James' interference.

In October, Natalya joined forces with Sasha Banks and Bayley against The Riott Squad (Sarah Logan, Liv Morgan and Ruby Riott) which led to a six–woman tag team match at the first ever all women's pay–per–view, Evolution, where Natalya, Banks and Bayley were victorious. Shortly after the event, Natalya continued her feud with Ruby Riott after the latter broke the "glasses" of Natalya's recently deceased father. During that time, both women were announced as the final members of Team Raw for the interbrand women's traditional five–on–five tag team elimination match, however, they were eventually removed from the match as they brawled just before Survivor Series started. On the December 3 episode of Raw, in what was supposed to be a tag team match pitting Natalya and Ronda Rousey against Nia Jax and Tamina, The Riott Squad attacked Natalya and put her through a table while Jax and Tamina cornered Rousey to prevent her from helping. This led to a tables match between Ruby Riott and Natalya at the TLC: Tables, Ladders & Chairs event, where Natalya gained revenge and defeated Riott after powerbombing her from the top rope through a table. On the December 24 episode of Raw, after she won an eight-woman gauntlet match to become the number one contender a week prior, Natalya faced Rousey for her Raw Women's Championship, however, she was unsuccessful in winning the match and the title. On January 27, 2019, at the 2019 Royal Rumble, Natalya entered the second women's Royal Rumble match at number 2, lasting 56:01 (surpassing Sasha Banks' previous record set in 2018), and eliminated Liv Morgan and Sarah Logan, before she was eliminated by Nia Jax.

==== Women's Tag Team Champion (2019–2021) ====
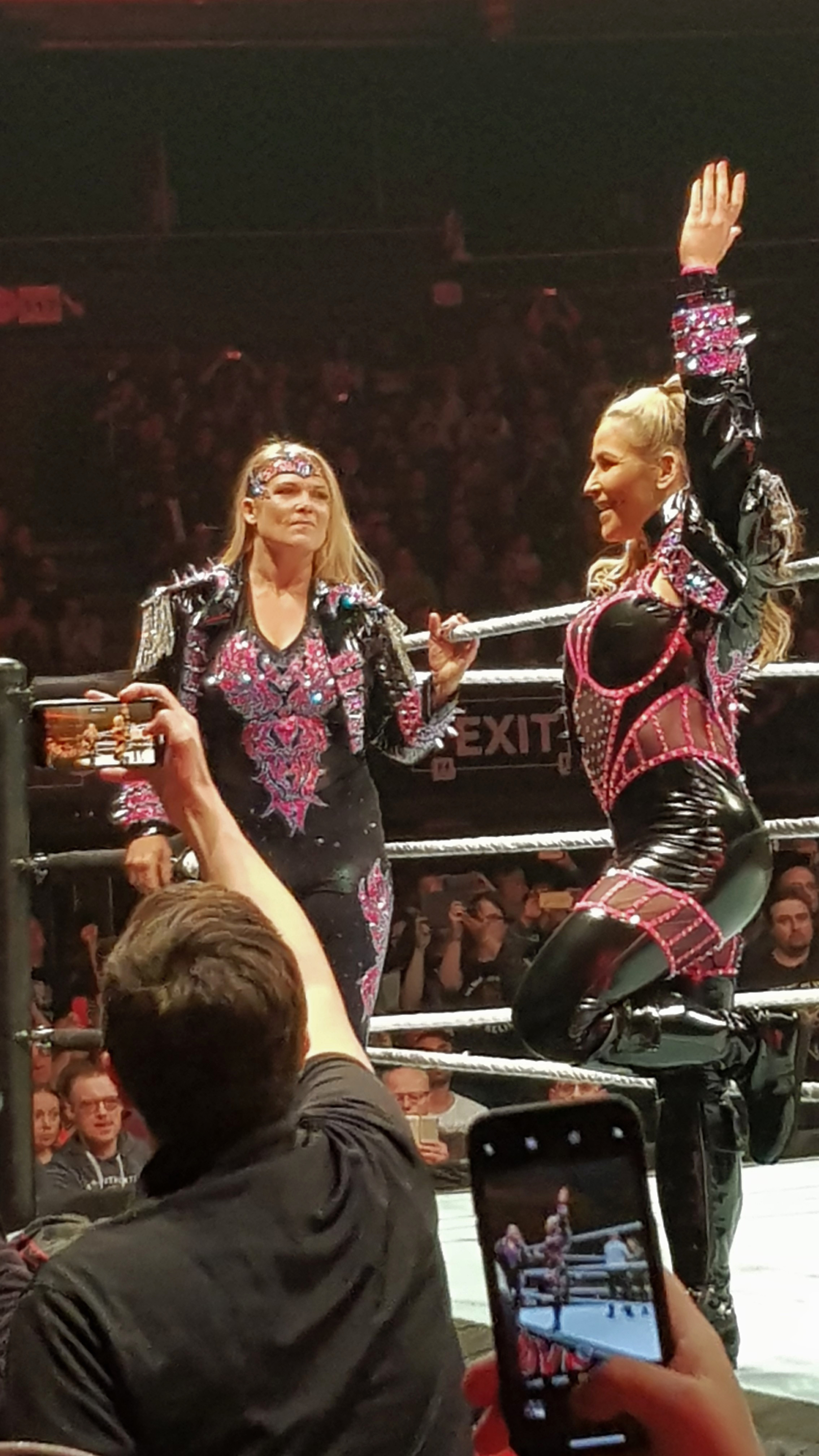
Natalya and Beth Phoenix at a live event in 2019

At Fastlane, Natalya reunited her team with Beth Phoenix, known as The Divas of Doom, after the two were attacked by Nia Jax and Tamina. The Divas of Doom took part of a fatal four-way tag team match for the WWE Women's Tag Team Championship at WrestleMania 35 on April 7, however, the match was won by The IIconics (Billie Kay and Peyton Royce).

In May, Natalya competed in the Money in the Bank ladder match at the namesake pay–per–view, where she was unsuccessful in winning the match. In June, Natalya and Alexa Bliss were supposed to compete in a late addition match at the Super Show-Down pay–per–view in Jeddah, Saudi Arabia, however, the match was rejected by the Saudi Arabian government just before the show started due to the suppression of women's rights. On July 15's edition of Raw, Natalya won a fatal four-way elimination match to become the #1 contender for Becky Lynch's Raw Women's Championship. At SummerSlam, Natalya was unsuccessful in winning the Raw Women's title from Lynch in a Submission match. On the Raw after SummerSlam, Natalya revealed that she suffered a storyline dislocated elbow and came out wearing a cast, when she was then subjected to a brutal assault from the returning Sasha Banks, whom Natalya considered a friend. Natalya was defeated by Banks on August 26 edition of Raw. Natalya later began feuding with Lacey Evans, exchanging victories and losses, before defeating her in a last woman standing match. The pair later took on the Kabuki Warriors in a losing effort. Natalya defeated Evans again at Crown Jewel, which was the first ever women's match to take place in Saudi Arabia. On the second night of WrestleMania 36 on April 5, 2020, she lost to Liv Morgan in the pre-show.

On the June 15 episode of Raw, Natalya and Liv Morgan lost to The IIconics. Afterward, Natalya began turning heel by ripping on Morgan and claiming that she had been given no respect, with Lana venting her frustrations to Natalya afterward. On the June 22 episode of Raw, Natalya turned heel for the first time since 2018, when she solidified her alliance with Lana and defeated Morgan by submission. On the October 12 episode of Raw, Natalya would end her alliance with Lana after the duo were defeated by Mandy Rose and Dana Brooke. The same night, Natalya competed in a battle royal for a Raw Women's Championship opportunity where she would survive to the final two before being eliminated by winner Lana.

As part of the 2020 Draft in October, Natalya was drafted to the SmackDown brand. In January 2021, Natalya formed an alliance with Tamina while putting the women's tag team division on notice. On the January 30 episode of WWE Backstage, the two allies were forced to face each other in a match to determine who would be the number 30 entrant at the Royal Rumble, in which Natalya won, earning her spot. Natalya and Tamina won a Tag Team Turmoil Match on the first night of WrestleMania 37 for an opportunity to face Nia Jax and Shayna Baszler for the WWE Women's Tag Team Championship on the second night. However, they failed to win the titles. On the May 14 episode of SmackDown, she and Tamina would defeat Baszler and Jax to win the WWE Women's Tag Team Championship. On the September 20 episode of Raw, they lost the titles to Nikki A.S.H. and Rhea Ripley.

As part of the 2021 Draft, Tamina was drafted to the Raw brand while Natalya remained on the SmackDown brand, ending the team. In October, Natalya entered the Queen's Crown tournament, where she lost to Doudrop in the first round.

==== Various feuds and alliances (2022–2025) ====
She participated in the Royal Rumble match at the namesake event on January 29, 2022, entering at No. 24 and eliminating Tamina and Summer Rae, but was eliminated by Bianca Belair. In March, Natalya formed an alliance with Shayna Baszler, challenging for the WWE Women's Tag Team Championship; this led to a fatal four-way tag team match for the titles on the second night of WrestleMania 38, which was won by Sasha Banks and Naomi. On the June 3 episode of SmackDown, Natalya won a six-pack challenge for the opportunity to face Ronda Rousey for the SmackDown Women's Championship at Money in the Bank, but failed to win the title.

During a backstage segment on the October 28 episode of SmackDown, Natalya was attacked by Shayna Baszler who aligned with Ronda Rousey, effectively ending their alliance. As of result, Natalya turned face for the first time since 2020. On the same night, at a SmackDown taping ahead of Crown Jewel, Natalya suffered a storyline nasal injury during a post-match attack conducted by Shayna Baszler at the instruction of Ronda Rousey. This was done to cover Natalya's real life nasal surgery, in which she would need three months to recover. She returned during the 2023 Royal Rumble match as the 11th entrant, being eliminated along with Baszler by Damage CTRL (Bayley, Dakota Kai, Iyo Sky). On February 5, 2023, Natalya won a fatal four-way match on SmackDown against Baszler, Zelina Vega, and Shotzi to qualify for the women's Elimination Chamber match, where the winner would be given a Raw Women's Championship match against Bianca Belair at WrestleMania 39. On February 18, after starting the match and eliminating Liv Morgan by technical submission with the help of eventual winner Asuka, Natalya was eliminated by Carmella, becoming the third woman in the match to be eliminated overall. On March 25, 2023, Natalya teamed with Shotzi to qualify for the Women's WrestleMania Showcase fatal four-way tag team match at WrestleMania 39. The match took place on the second night, in which Rousey and Baszler were victorious after Rousey forced Shotzi to tap out with an arm bar.

As part of the 2023 WWE Draft, Natalya was drafted to the Raw brand. On the May 8 episode of Raw, Natalya stepped up to SmackDown Women's Champion Rhea Ripley but Ripley would make her way out of the ring before things got physical. At Night of Champions, Natalya unsuccessfully challenged Ripley for the SmackDown Women's Championship in a squash match that lasted 70 seconds. On the June 8 episode of Raw, Natalya faced Zoey Stark to qualify for the women's Money in the Bank ladder match, but was defeated. On the June 19 episode of Raw, Natalya was originally scheduled in a rematch against Ripley, however the match never began as Ripley attacked Natalya before the bell rang. On the July 3 episode of Raw, Natalya once again unsuccessfully challenged Ripley in a rematch for the Women's World Championship, with the match being well received. Since then, Natalya has also begun regularly appearing on WWE Main Event defeating the likes of Xia Li, Tegan Nox, and Nikki Cross. On September 6, it was announced that Natalya would once again challenge Ripley for the Women's World Championship at Superstar Spectacle, Natalya was defeated at the event. On the September 18 episode of Raw, Natalya unsuccessfully challenged Becky Lynch for the NXT Women's Championship. Over the following weeks, Natalya formed an alliance with Tegan Nox. On November 20 episode of Raw, Natalya and Nox won a fatal 4-way tag team match to receive a WWE Women's Tag Team Championship opportunity. On the November 27 episode of Raw, the duo unsuccessfully challenged Chelsea Green and Piper Niven for the titles.

On January 27, 2024, at the 2024 Royal Rumble, Natalya entered the women's Royal Rumble match at number 1, and lasted 20:57. During the match, she attempted to eliminate her tag team partner Tegan Nox before being eliminated by Nox herself. In March 2024, Natalya would start making appearances on the NXT brand and would form an alliance with Karmen Petrovic. On the April 9 episode of NXT, Natalya unsuccessfully challenged Roxanne Perez for the NXT Women's Championship, after interference from Lola Vice. On week 2 of Spring Breakin', Natalya was defeated by Vice in an NXT Underground match. Natalya participated in the 2024 Queen of the Ring tournament, where she was defeated by Iyo Sky in the first round.

On September 9 episode of Raw, Natalya made her comeback after a three-months hiatus to team up with Lyra Valkyria and Zelina Vega, defeating Pure Fusion Collective (Shayna Baszler, Sonya Deville and Zoey Stark). At the Royal Rumble on February 1, 2025, Natalya entered the women's Royal Rumble match as the 18th entrant, before being eliminated by Liv Morgan. In March, Natalya began mentoring Maxxine Dupri, eventually forming a team with her called The Dungeon Dolls. The duo would team together on the April 11 episode of Smackdown, where they entered a tag team gauntlet match for a WWE Women's Tag Team Championship match at WrestleMania 41 but were unsuccessful. On July 9, Natalya appeared on WWE's developmental brand WWE Evolve, challenging Kali Armstrong for the Evolve Women's Championship, where Armstrong retained her title after pinning Natalya with the "Kali Connection". On July 25, Natalya made her debut for WWE's sister promotion Lucha Libre AAA Worldwide (AAA) during the Alianzas event, teaming with Lola Vice, defeating Faby Apache & Lady Shani and Dalys & Chik Tormenta in a three-way tag team match. On August 18, Natalya challenged Becky Lynch for the WWE Women's Intercontinental Championship on WWE Raw, where Lynch retained her title.

==== "The Lowkey Legend" (2026–present) ====
On the January 19, 2026 episode of Raw, Natalya turned heel for the first time since 2022 after assisting Lynch defeat Maxxine Dupri for the Women's Intercontinental Championship and then attacking Dupri after the match. She subsequently adopted her "Lowkey Legend" persona that she uses in her non-WWE appearances and returned to her ring name Nattie in the 2026 Royal Rumble on January 31, 2026, where she entered the namesake match at No. 13 and was eliminated by eventual winner Liv Morgan.

In June 2026, Natalya began appearing in NXT as the leader of an all-female faction consisting of Karmen Petrovic, Layla Diggs and Nikkita Lyons while she began a feud with Jaida Parker, defeating Parker on June 16 episode of NXT. Parker defeated Nattie in a street fight match on the July 21 episode of NXT after Thea Hail threw the towel on behalf of Nattie, who was trapped in a sharpshooter. At NXT Heatwave on August 30, Nattie lost to Parker in a rubber match, with Petrovic abandoning Nattie's faction for Los Perros del Mal, thus ending their feud.

=== Independent circuit (2025–present) ===
Whilst still signed to WWE, Neidhart, billed once again under her pre-WWE name Nattie Neidhart, was announced as a member of the cast of the thirteenth edition of Josh Barnett's Bloodsport, held by Game Changer Wrestling during WrestleMania 41 weekend. She defeated Miyu Yamashita before being involved in a brawl with NWA World Women's Champion Kenzie Paige. This led to a match for the championship at NWA's Crockett Cup 2025, where she was defeated. On June 28, Neidhart made her Reality of Wrestling debut, headlining the promotion's first all-women's event, Hart and Soul, defeating Promise Braxton via submission. On August 1, during SummerSlam weekend, she returned to GCW for Josh Barnett's Bloodsport XIV, where she defeated Masha Slamovich.

Neidhart made her television debut for NWA Powerrr on September 26, 2026, defeating both Kenzie and Kylie Paige in a triple threat match.

== Other media ==
Natalya appeared alongside Paige, Brie Bella and the Chrisley family on the 88th Academy Awards edition of E! Countdown to the Red Carpet in February 2016.

Natalya has appeared in sixteen video games as a playable character. She made her in-game debut in WWE SmackDown vs. Raw 2010 and appears in WWE SmackDown vs. Raw 2011, WWE '12, WWE '13 (DLC), WWE 2K14, WWE 2K15, WWE 2K16, WWE 2K17, WWE 2K18, WWE 2K19, WWE 2K20, WWE 2K Battlegrounds, WWE 2K22, WWE 2K23, WWE 2K24, WWE 2K25 and WWE 2K26. She has appeared in five WWE mobile games: WWE SuperCard, WWE Champions, WWE Mayhem, WWE Universe, and WWE TapMania.

=== Filmography ===
Year	Title	Role	Notes
2013–2019	Total Divas	Herself	Main cast (seasons 1–9)
2014	Chasing Maria Menounos	Herself	Guest: 1 episode
2015	WWE Breaking Ground	Herself	Episode: "Countdown"
2015	WWE Tough Enough	Herself	Guest (season 6)
2016	E! Countdown to the Red Carpet	Herself	88th Academy Awards
2016	Hollywood Medium	Herself	Guest: 1 episode
2017–2019	Total Bellas	Herself	Guest (seasons 2–4): 5 episodes
2018	Carpool Karaoke: The Series	Herself	Guest: 1 episode
2018	Rachael Ray	Herself	Guest: 1 episode
2020	A Little Late with Lilly Singh	Herself	Guest: 1 episode
2020	Fight Like a Girl	Herself	Episode: "Natalya and Annie"
2020	25 Words or Less	Herself	Guest: 3 episodes
2021–2023	Biography: WWE Legends	Herself	4 episodes
2022	WWE Evil	Herself	Guest: 2 episodes
2022	MasterChef Junior	Herself	Guest: 1 episode
2022–2023	WWE Rivals	Herself	4 episodes
2023	Nikki Bella Says I Do	Herself	Episode: Pole Dancing With the Stars
2023	Wheel of Fortune	Herself	Celebrity Contestant Partner: 2 Episodes
2023	WWE's Most Wanted Treasures	Herself	Guest: 1 episode
2023	Celebrity Family Feud	Herself	Guest: 1 episode

=== Bibliography ===
- The Last Hart Beating: From the Dungeon to WWE (BenBella Books, 2025, Hardcover) ISBN 1-63774-787-X, ISBN 978-1637747872

== Personal life ==
Neidhart has known TJ Wilson since she was 12 years old, and they began dating in November 2001. The couple married on June 26, 2013. Their wedding was featured on the first season of Total Divas. She also owns a home in Calgary. On October 1, 2016, Neidhart had her two front teeth knocked out during a house show match in Las Vegas, Nevada.

Beginning in October 2017, Neidhart has been writing a weekly column which appears in the Calgary Sun and Edmonton Sun, detailing her life and career.

In an October 23, 2019, interview with fansite WrestleZone, Natalya confirmed her voluntary childlessness, stating, "I’ve never wanted to have kids. I was very close to my parents, I’m very close to my sisters, I even have a very maternal instinct in the locker room with the girls that I work with. But I don’t want my own kids… I don’t think anyone should be a parent unless they really are fully committed to it."

== Championships and accomplishments ==
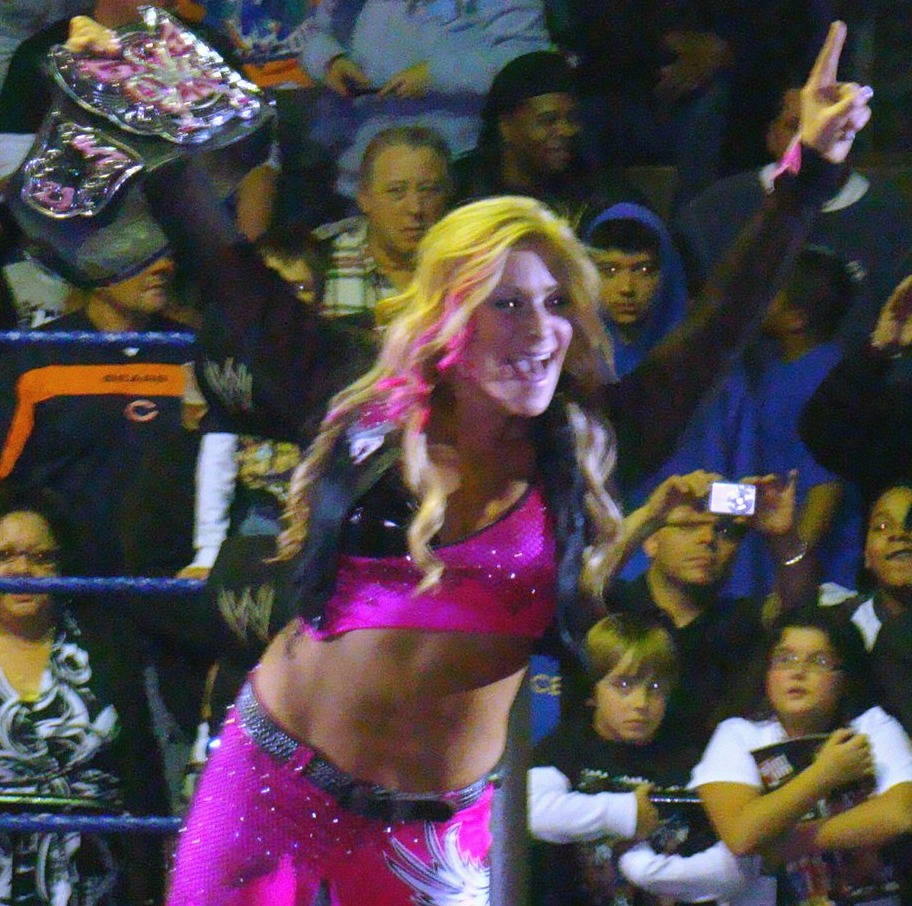
Natalya is a former one-time WWE Divas Champion...

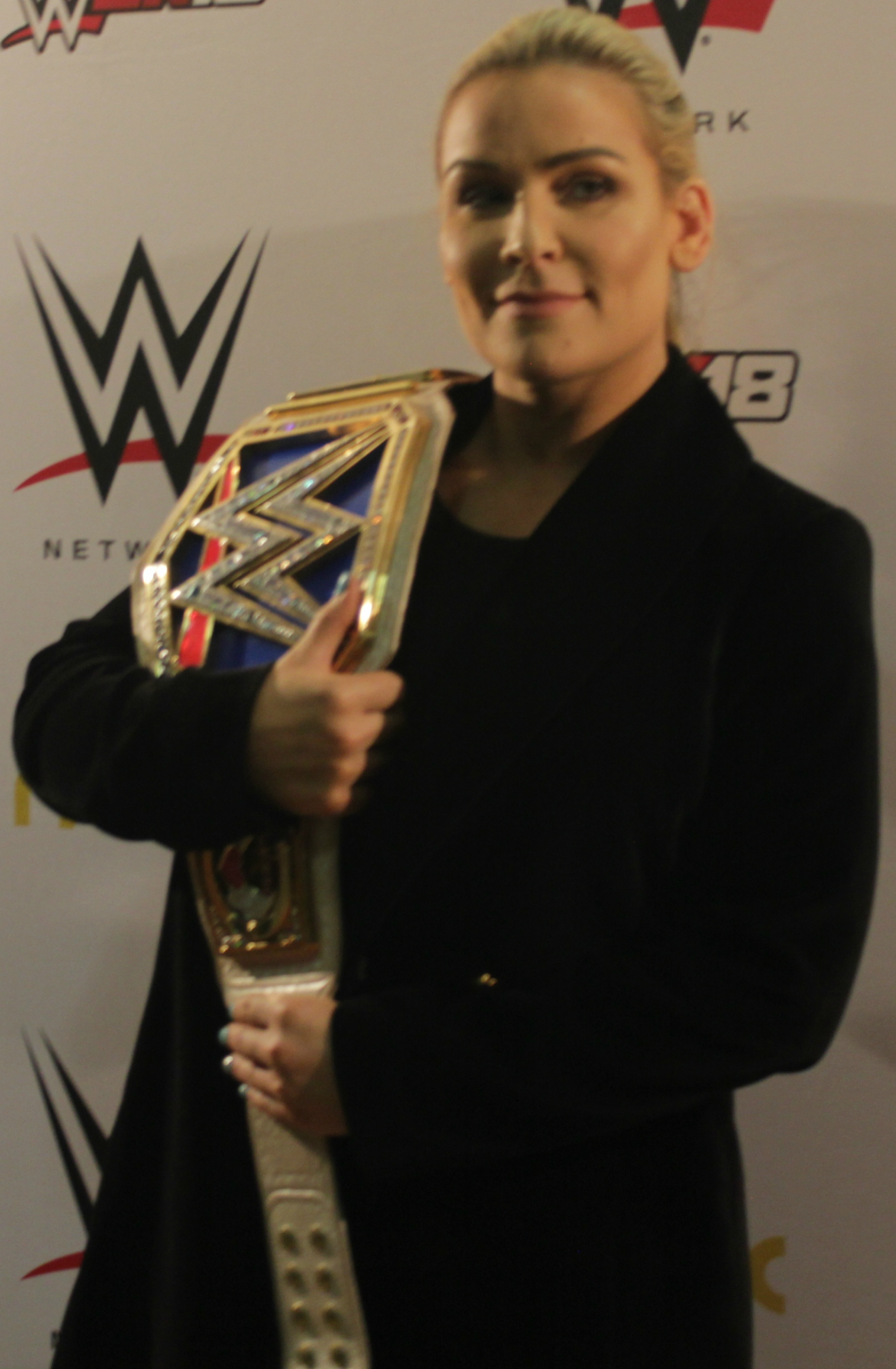
...and a former one-time SmackDown Women's Champion, making her a two-time women's world champion in WWE.

- Cauliflower Alley Club
  - Lou Thesz Award (2025) (first woman to receive that award)
- Canadian Pro-Wrestling Hall of Fame
  - Class of 2023
- Canadian Wrestling Hall of Fame
  - Individually
  - With the Hart family
- Guinness Book of World Records
  - Most appearances on pay-per-view for a female WWE wrestler - 75
  - Most matches for a female WWE wrestler - 1514
  - Most wins by a female WWE wrestler - 663
  - Most submission wins of any man or woman in WWE
- NWA: Extreme Canadian Championship Wrestling
  - ECCW Women's Championship (1 time)
- Pro Wrestling Illustrated
  - Ranked No. 4 of the top 50 female wrestlers in the PWI Female 50 in 2011
  - Ranked No. 66 of the top 150 female wrestlers in the PWI Women's 150 in 2021
  - Ranked No. 28 of the top 50 Tag Teams in the PWI Tag Team 50 in 2021 – with Tamina
- Rolling Stone
  - Overdue Title Run of the Year (2017)
- Sports Illustrated
  - Ranked No. 11 in the top 30 female wrestlers in 2018
- Stampede Wrestling
  - Stampede Women's Pacific Championship (2 times)
  - Women's Wrestler of the Year (2005)
- Wrestling Observer Newsletter
  - Worst Worked Match of the Year (2013) with Brie Bella, Cameron, Eva Marie, JoJo, Naomi, and Nikki Bella vs. AJ Lee, Aksana, Alicia Fox, Kaitlyn, Rosa Mendes, Summer Rae, and Tamina Snuka on November 24
- WWE
  - WWE Divas Championship (1 time)
  - WWE SmackDown Women's Championship (1 time)
  - WWE Women's Tag Team Championship (1 time) – with Tamina
  - WWE Women's Speed Championship #1 Contender Tournament (November 27, 2024–January 8, 2025)
- Wheel of Fortune
  - Wheel of Fortune WWE Week Tournament
- Women's Wrestling Hall of Fame
  - Susan Tex Green Award (2025)
