= Chasing Maria Menounos =

2014 American reality television series

- Genre: Reality
- Starring: Maria Menounos; Keven Undergaro; Costas Menounos; Litsa Menounos; Joe Gear
- Country of origin: United States
- Original language: English
- No. of seasons: 1
- No. of episodes: 10

Production
- Executive producers: Angie Day; Banks Tarver; Ken Druckerman; Keven Undergaro; Maria Menounos
- Camera setup: Multiple-camera
- Running time: 22 minutes
- Production companies: Left/Right Productions; Underman/Omegagirl Productions

Original release
- Network: Oxygen
- Release: March 18 – May 20, 2014

Chasing Maria Menounos is an American reality television series that debuted March 18, 2014, on Oxygen. The show follows the lives of Maria Menounos and long-time boyfriend Keven, who have been living together unmarried for over 15 years with Maria's parents, Costas and Litsa, and Keven's lifetime best friend from Boston, Joe Gear. The show chronicles Menounos's career in the entertainment industry and family matters. These include living with traditional Greek immigrant parents that insist she marry and have children, and working her jobs such as managing an online broadcast network, AfterBuzz TV, with boyfriend Keven.

== Cast ==
- Maria Menounos
- Keven Undergaro
- Costas Menounos
- Litsa Menounos
- Joe Gear

== Episodes ==
No.	Title	Original release date
1	"Tick, Tock, Biological Clock"	March 18, 2014
2	"Mother-in-Law Knows Best"	March 25, 2014
3	"A Nice Greek Boy"	April 1, 2014
4	"Back to My Roots"	April 8, 2014
5	"Over Budget and Underspermed"	April 15, 2014
6	"Party Pooper"	April 22, 2014
7	"Does Maria Not Like Me?"	April 29, 2014
8	"Family Smackdown"	May 6, 2014
9	"Costas Down"	May 13, 2014
10	"It's Good To Be Greek"	May 20, 2014
