= AfterBuzz TV =

Pop culture website and podcast

Presentation
- Genre: TV/talk show
- Language: English
- Updates: Daily
- Length: Approx. 1 Hour

Production
- Production: Stephen Lemieux – executive producer; Jonathan Moulton – producer; Ryan Nilsen - producer; Steph Sabraw – producer; Briana Phipps - scheduling coordinator; Jeff Graham - event and guest coordinator

AfterBuzz TV is an online news website created by Maria Menounos and produced by Keven Undergaro that specializes in pop culture content related to several television series including Game of Thrones, Big Brother, The Flash, Real Housewives, and Grey's Anatomy. They also produced aftershow podcasts related to the same TV shows. It launched in 2012.

On each of AfterBuzz’s TV after-show, a mix of celebrities, personalities, and industry professionals break down that night's episode, take calls from fans, and interview guests. The network produces over 100 hours of content per week. They also produce "Spotlight On", an in-depth, long-form interview series with stars and showrunners.

As of July 10, 2020, the network announced a hiatus of further podcasts due to the COVID-19 pandemic. There has been no announcement on its website or social media about when or if podcasts will resume.

== History ==
Producer Keven Undergaro and Maria Menounos created the AfterBuzz TV network to discuss their favorite show, AMC's Breaking Bad, and create a space for fans to interact. In November 2013, AfterBuzzTV celebrated its 5,000th episode milestone. The network was one of the first adopters to provide their content directly on SoundCloud. It produced over 150 hours of content per week. Their Big Brother podcast was the No. 1 rated podcast on iTunes for that series. Their roster of hosts included over 400 people. They worked with "Stone Cold" Steve Austin.
