= LAPD Mental Evaluation Unit =

Mental health unit of the Los Angeles Police Department

The Mental Evaluation Unit (MEU), including the Systemwide Mental Assessment Response Team (SMART), is the police crisis intervention team of the Los Angeles Police Department (LAPD), working with people suspected of having a mental illness. The MEU seeks to de-escalate situations where mentally-ill suspects are believed be involved.

Further insight relative to the MEU can be found within the following governmental publications:

- A Guide to Implementing Police-Based Diversion Programs for People with Mental Illness, by Melissa Reuland, Police Executive Research Forum – 2004
- Enhancing Success of Police-Based Diversion Programs for People with Mental Illness, by Melissa Reuland and Jason Cheney, Police Executive Research Forum – May 2005
- Department of Justice, Bureau of Justice Assistance, Improving Responses to People with Mental Illnesses, Strategies for Effective Law Enforcement Training 2008.
- Department of Justice, Bureau of Justice Assistance, Improving Responses to People with Mental Illnesses, The Essential Elements of a Specialized Law Enforcement–Based Program, 2008.
- Department of Justice, Bureau of Justice Assistance, Law Enforcement Responses to People with Mental Illness, A Guide to Research-Informed Policy and Practice, 2009.
- Department of Justice, Bureau of Justice Assistance, Improving Responses to People with Mental Illnesses, Tailoring Law Enforcement Initiatives to Individual Jurisdictions, 2010.
- Consent Decree Mental illness Reports.
