= Bar Rescue season 6 =

Bar Rescue
- Season 6
- Promotional poster for Season 6
- No. of episodes: 47

Release
- Original network: Paramount Network
- Original release: March 11, 2018 – September 29, 2019

Season chronology
- ← Previous; Season 5 Next → Season 7

The sixth season of the American reality series Bar Rescue premiered on March 11, 2018, and ended on September 29, 2019, on Paramount Network (formerly Spike). Like prior seasons, season 6 was also split into multiple parts.

== Experts ==
- Jon Taffer – Host/Star/Bar Consultant

=== Culinary ===
- Vic Vegas
- Anthony Lamas
- Jason Santos
- Tiffany Derry
- Michael Ferraro
- Ryan Scott
- Aaron McCargo Jr.
- Kevin Bludso
- Frank Pinello

=== Mixology ===
- Lisamarie Joyce
- Jacob Forth
- Rob Floyd
- Mia Mastroianni
- Shawn Ford
- Phil Wills
- Charity Johnston
- Emily DeLicce
- Ashley Clark
- Derrick Turner
- Brian Van Flandern
- Alex Goode
- Amy Koffsky
- Tommy Palmer

=== Additional experts ===
- Jillian Schmitz – Dance expert
- Renae Lemmens – Adult entertainment expert
- Oscar Sidia – Clinical professional counselor

== Episodes ==
Note: 10 episodes from this season were produced for season 5, but were left over for unspecified reasons, as these episodes were "burned off". Evidently, the graphics package from the previous season is a clear indicator, as well as the introduction phases in the beginning of those episodes.

No. overall	No. in season	Title	Bar name	Location	Original release date	Prod. code	Viewers (millions)
150	1	"Put It on Cody's Tab"	Game Time Sports Grille	Arlington, Tennessee	March 11, 2018	601	0.77
The son of a berating father struggles to deal with his behavior and a disgusting kitchen. New Name: The Legacy Bar & Grille
151	2	"Close, But No Cigar"	Havana Mix Cigar	Memphis, Tennessee	March 18, 2018	602	0.63
A cigar man's attempt at opening a bar gets off to a rocky start after he hires his inexperienced son to run the business. New Name: Robusto by Havana Mix (modernized version of old name)
152	3	"Weird Science"	Paladino's	Tarzana, California	March 25, 2018	530	0.61
Jon helps two cancer scientists bring the scientific method into running a bar. New Name: Theory – A Vintage Parlor Bar (Note: This bar has been closed.)
153	4	"Ground Control to Major Jon"	King's Duck Inn	Merritt Island, Florida	April 1, 2018	528	0.62
Located miles from the Cape Canaveral, the feud between the owner and her daughter blasts off the success of the bar following the death of the owner's father. New Name: KDI (modernized version of old name)
154	5	"Mississippi Rears"	Joe's Thirsty Lizard Bar & Grill	Horn Lake, Mississippi	April 8, 2018	603	0.59
Jon catches a dirty little secret inside a Navy vet's bar when the surveillance footage reveal the cook taking a shower in the kitchen. At the same time, the vet's friend and unqualified manager's inconsistencies in running a bar have caused a downward spiral which in turn is causing the owner's money to keep going down every month. New Name: The Iron Horse
155	6	"Back to the Bar: Don't Call it a Comeback"	N/A	N/A	April 15, 2018	368	0.55
Jon checks in with the owners of the Comeback and Lona's City Limits to find out whether their old habits are getting the way of their success. He also talks with Sal, the owner of the since-closed Dimples, to find out about his latest plans.
156	7	"Pole Without a Purpose"	Club Platinum	Las Vegas, Nevada	April 22, 2018	523	0.78
Jon goes for the big gamble as he heads to Vegas to rescue a gentlemen's club. New Name: N/A (Note: This bar kept its original name.)
157	8	"An Ode to the Cap'n"	Cap'n Odie's Lounge	Atlantic Beach, Florida	April 29, 2018	610	0.77
After the original owner's death, his daughter tries to save the bar from sinking the ship. New Name: N/A
158	9	"Crazy Little Thing Called Selman"	Copper Rocket Pub	Maitland, Florida	May 6, 2018	533	0.78
Salmonella poisoning invades the famous Copper Rocket while Jon tries to get the owner under control before the rocket explodes. New Name: N/A (Note: This bar has been sold.)
159	10	"Caving In"	The Cave Sports Bar	Anaheim, California	May 13, 2018	529	0.67
The son of hardworking immigrants is driving his late father's neighborhood bar into the ground with a poorly planned renovation and bad over-serving problems. New Name: N/A
160	11	"Back to the Bar: Blue in the Frog Face"	N/A	N/A	May 20, 2018	367	0.53
Jon checks in with the owners of MoonRunners Saloon, Blue Frog 22, George & Dragon, and Mac & Chester's SRO, bars that have been hampered by family disagreements. He also gets an update from Spirits on Bourbon.
161	12	"Down and Out in Las Vegas"	Barley Pop's Bar & Grill	Las Vegas, Nevada	June 3, 2018	522	0.94
An owner struggles with two tragedies which have caused him to drink heavily. At the same time, his fiancee tries to get him to kick the habit but has a hard time dealing with her own anxiety. New Name: The Valley Saloon (Note: This bar reverted to its original name following the rescue.)
162	13	"Back to the Bar: The Power of Bacon and Beer"	N/A	N/A	June 10, 2018	370	0.58
Jon revisits Cirivello's and Bacon Bar, then looks back at some of his and the audience's favorite moments from previous rescues.
163	14	"Father Knows Best"	No Name Saloon	Edgewater, Florida	June 17, 2018	535	0.76
Jon visits a rowdy biker bar where the owner refuses to trust his daughter's managerial skills. New Name: N/A
164	15	"Phishing for Answers"	Phish Heads	Lake City, Florida	June 24, 2018	607	0.84
A Florida couple's bar is in need of serious help after years of their son's mismanagement. Jon brings in his big guns (mixologist Mia Mastroianni and culinary expert Aaron McCargo Jr.) to help this bar bounce back. New Name: Phish Tales (modernized version of old name)
165	16	"Not Cleared for Takeoff"	The Airliner	Lincoln Heights, Los Angeles, California	July 1, 2018	526	0.79
A storied L.A. music venue has fallen into disrepair and the owner doesn't seem to care. It's up to Jon to revive this owner's passion for his own business. Note: For the recon, Jon brought in the band American Authors who also performed at the grand re-opening. New Name: N/A
166	17	"Back to the Bar: Tough Love"	N/A	N/A	July 8, 2018	361	0.52
Jon revisits Badlands Country Nightclub and La Luz Ultralounge, couple-owned bars that have been impacted by rocky relationships.
167	18	"Fish Out of Blue Water"	Blue Water	Jacksonville Beach, Florida	July 15, 2018	609	0.79
The owner is an industrious immigrant with a history of business successes, but he may have bitten off more than he can chew after buying the Blue Water, especially with his hands-off managerial approach. Note: For the recon, Jon brings in rapper Lil' Jon and his team. Lil' Jon's team performs the recon itself while he watches from outside with Jon. New Name: Sydney – An Australian Beach Club
168	19	"Operation: Puerto Rico"	El K'rajo, Centro Comunal Piñones-Loíza and Bienvenidos A Loíza	Loíza, Puerto Rico	July 22, 2018	606	0.82
Jon heads to Loíza, Puerto Rico to rescue a bar devastated by Hurricane Maria. What starts out as a bar rescue turns into a community rescue and the biggest rescue Jon has ever done as he works to help a community devastated by a natural disaster and struggling to recover. Along with rescuing the bar, Jon repairs the local community center and its playground, baseball field and basketball court, all devastated by the hurricane. Jon's team comes to include Dallas Mavericks owner and Shark Tank star Mark Cuban, Mavericks star J.J. Barea, actor Luis Guzmán, entrepreneur Bethenny Frankel, and musician/former baseball player Bernie Williams. Furthermore, Jon personally gives the owners $12,000 to settle their mortgage after learning they are in danger of losing their home. Note: The beginning and ending narrations are done by Jon himself and instead of an update being given of the bar's status at the end where he speaks to the audience about the disaster and how to help. New Name: N/A
169	20	"Life, Liberty, and the Pursuit of Fatballs"	Fatballs	Jacksonville, Florida	July 29, 2018	608	0.67
This bar and grill's unappetizing name is just the first of many problems, but the major one for Jon to overcome is getting the belligerent owner to accept responsibility. New Name: The Bayou
170	21	"The Unwanted Saloon"	The Wanted Saloon	Dickson, Tennessee	August 5, 2018	604	0.83
A remote location is just the first of the problems and challenges Jon must overcome to rescue The Wanted Saloon. Note: During the stress test, Taffer places an acoustic guitar on the wall nearest the bar. Every time the owner/staff made a mistake, Jon would cut a string on the guitar. If all the strings were cut, the stress test ended and Jon Taffer would go home. New Name: The Dickson
171	22	"Back to the Bar: The Tradewinds of Change"	N/A	N/A	August 12, 2018	369	0.56
Jon revisits the Tradewinds and 22 Klicks Bar & Grill to see if their employees are still working together or returning to their old ways.
172	23	"Star Lite, Star Not So Brite"	Britestar Tavern	Glendora, California	August 19, 2018	527	0.78
Nostalgia drives a successful bar owner to buy the establishment he patronized when he was young, but paying more attention to his primary business is causing the second bar to slide into chaos ... unless Jon can stop it. New Name: N/A
173	24	"There Will Be Family Blood"	Island Bar & Grill	Blue Island, Illinois	August 26, 2018	517	0.71
A novice owner opens a bar to support his sister, who suffered severe brain damage in a car accident, but when he staffs the bar with inexperienced family members and the business becomes a money pit, Jon and his experts are called in. Note: Unlike the previous episodes, this is the first episode where the experts watched the recon instead of Jon. This was also the final appearance of Aaron McCargo Jr. as one of Jon's chef experts. New Name: Island Lounge (modernized version of old name)
174	25	"The Lights Came Back in Puerto Rico"	Shibō	San Juan, Puerto Rico	March 3, 2019	614	0.48
Asian fusion restaurant Shibō was a huge success before Hurricane Maria hit Puerto Rico. Can Jon help a brother and sister who are over their heads in damages and bring back one of the lights of Puerto Rico? New Name: N/A
175	26	"Dalia's Inferno"	Country Nights	San Antonio, Texas	March 10, 2019	619	0.48
Jon has more than his work cut out for him when he tries to help a bar owner whose life-of-the-party personality has set the standard for indulgent on-the-job drinking and unprofessional practices. New Name: Madame Dalia's Country Bar
176	27	"Don't Cry for Me Jon Taffer"	RJ's Replay	Tucson, Arizona	March 17, 2019	615	0.67
RJ's Replay is full of potential, but failing due to poor management. Jon must not only save the bar, but also repair the owner's relationship with his wife and parents. Note: For recon, Jon brought in Aleah and Donna from Season 3 rescued bar Chilleen's on 17 (formerly Kid Chillleen's Bad Ass BBQ). This is also the second time he brought in bartender Ashley Clark from Roc Nightclub as a mixology expert. New Name: The Frozen Cactus Ice Bar & Fire Grill
177	28	"Owner on the Run"	The Original Hideout	Tucson, Arizona	March 24, 2019	616	0.60
Jon attempts to rescue The Original Hideout, despite owner Ramiro's $300,000 debt and brother Raoul, who's overwhelmed by his managerial duties, walking out. New Name: N/A
178	29	"Twerking 9 to 5"	Crossroads Grille	Antioch, Tennessee	March 31, 2019	605	0.70
A twerking, drinking, fighting staff threatens Ashley and Robert Gaddy's once-thriving bar and leaving their future in serious doubt ... unless Jon can straighten both staff and management out. New Name: Gaddy Shack
179	30	"Back to School"	UNLV College of Hospitality	Las Vegas, Nevada	April 7, 2019	613	0.53
Jon puts the future of the service industry to the test when, as a favor to the school's dean, he and his experts help the school's culinary and mixology students prepare for a VIP cocktail party. But when rebuilding the venue proves more difficult than expected, Jon may have run out of time. Note: In this case, Jon did not actually perform a bar rescue but instead helped the UNLV College of Hospitality students.
180	31	"Tanked and Toasty"	The Recovery Room Bar	San Antonio, Texas	April 14, 2019	620	0.57
It's time for Jon to shut the party down when he finds a bar and marriage both crippled by the actions of its party-hungry owner. Note: Jon watched the recon with Shut it Down Podcast hosts Jim Search and Max Cohen. Jon also performs his own recon after becoming disgusted with what he sees. New Name: The Base Line
181	32	"Miles from Success"	Kiva Lounge and Bar	San Marcos, Texas	April 21, 2019	618	0.58
Two burnout rockers have lost $200,000 just two years into owning their bar. Now Jon has to make them face the music and grow up before their lights turn off for good. New Name: The Morgue
182	33	"Un-Civil War"	Eliphino	Las Vegas, Nevada	April 28, 2019	612	0.64
A Las Vegas dive bar with an unused kitchen struggles at the hands of an owner who either can't or won't ask for help and who makes more enemies than friends. Jon Taffer could be his greatest friend and rescue his business... or his worst nightmare if the owner doesn't change his ways. Note: Jon watched the recon with former manager Casey. New Name: Shattered
183	34	"LIV'n on a Prayer"	LIV Bar and Restaurant	Las Vegas, Nevada	May 5, 2019	611	0.62
LIV owner Michelle can't figure out what her business is in order to survive in highly competitive Las Vegas, especially with a server who's more interested in making huge tips than doing her job properly. Can Jon help steer Michelle in the right direction for success? Note: "LIV" stands for "54" in Roman numerals. New Name: The Halo Nightclub
184	35	"Big Trouble in Little China Grove"	The China Grove Trading Post	China Grove, Texas	May 12, 2019	617	0.67
When the owners of a country bar, a couple on the brink of retirement, can't stop enabling their belligerent daughter, Jon must get them to face facts. New Name: The Tipsy Bull
185	36	"Pie Hard"	Gil & Rick's Sports Bar and Pizzeria	Largo, Florida	May 19, 2019	621	0.67
Two long-time postal employees' failing pizza bar is on the brink of closing its doors for good unless Jon Taffer can find a way to rescue both the bar and their friendship. New Name: Sauced
186	37	"Driving Miss Tara"	New England's Ale House Grille	Palm Harbor, Florida	June 2, 2019	623	0.59
After being left by her husband, Tara, a newly-single mother, hires a general manager to not only help her save a failing bar but also to fill the void in her personal life....which may prove to be more harmful to the business than helpful. Note: Jon arrives alone and watches the recon with owner Tara. In addition, he brings in three players from the Tampa Bay Buccaneers to act as recon spies: nose tackle Beau Allen, tight end Cameron Brate, and guard Ali Marpet. New Name: Das Brauhaus & Cafe
187	38	"All Blaze, No Glory"	Thunderbolt Bar & Grill	Pleasant Valley, Missouri	July 14, 2019	628	0.59
Jenny McCarthy joins Jon to help the Thunderbolt Bar & Grill owner, an inexperienced man with poor leadership skills whose only ally is threatening to withdraw her services. Note: As of this episode, this was the final appearance of Lisamarie Joyce as one of Jon's mixologists as she publicly protested his comments regarding the hospitality industry during the Covid-19 pandemic in 2021. New Name: Thunderbird KSC Tavern
188	39	"Reckless Roundhouse"	Whiskey Girl Saloon	Fort Worth, Texas	July 21, 2019	624	0.67
To save the Whiskey Girl Saloon in the historic Fort Worth Stockyards, Jon must get an inexperienced co-owner to abandon his hard-partying alter ego, Rick Roundhouse. New Name: The Stampede Saloon
189	40	"John and Bert Bought a Bar"	Harbor Point Club & Grill	Richardson, Texas	July 28, 2019	626	0.59
Jon tries to fix the negligent behavior at Harbor Point Club & Grill in Richardson, Texas, where owners drink the profits away and the staff struggles to get one order right. Note: As Jon suspected that he might be getting played, he pretended to cancel the rescue in favor of another bar in order to test the owners' reactions and honesty. After seeing how genuinely distraught the owners were by the news, Jon realized that it was real and helped them out. New Name: JB Taco
190	41	"Green Walls and Donkey Balls"	Drunken Donkey Bar & Grill	Lewisville, Texas	August 4, 2019	625	0.76
Two best friends are acting more like jackasses than owners and find themselves on the verge of losing their dream. New Name: Butcher & Brew Pub
191	42	"Doreen's Dilemma"	Buffalo City Bar & Grille	St Petersburg, Florida	August 11, 2019	622	0.64
In his first-ever emergency rescue, Jon uses his last resort to help the overwhelmed and grieving owner of Buffalo City Bar & Grille save her father's legacy. Note: For recon, Jon brought in Sam Roberts and Jim Norton. Additionally, while the bar in this episode was later sold, it was done with Jon's help. New Name: BCBG (modernized version of old name) (Note: This bar was sold during the rescue.)
192	43	"Stix and Stones May Break Your Bar"	Stix & Stones Bar and Grill	Sugar Creek, Missouri	August 25, 2019	627	0.57
After a decade of success, a drag racing bar owner is seeing his profits go up in smoke. Note: For recon, Jon brought in two Kansas City Chiefs players: offensive tackle Mitchell Schwartz and guard Andrew Wylie. New Name: Pit Stop Bar & BBQ
193	44	"So We Meet Again, Mr. Taffer"	Edge of Town	Blue Springs, Missouri	September 8, 2019	629	0.57
In the previous Back to the Bar episode, Mark and Ozzie from the former Badlands Country Night Club (formerly known as Long Shots Sports Bar & Grill in Season 3) opened up Vertigo and were planning to get married. Years later, they call in Taffer once again when the staff starts drinking away their success at their new bar Ozzie currently runs while Mark was busy with Vertigo. While the original bar Jon rescued had failed, it was due to their landlord not renewing their lease and not for a failure on Mark and Ozzie's part. While helping the two, Jon states that the rescue is personal for him as he wants them to be able to get married and doesn't typically rescue the same people twice. New Name: Water's Edge Bar & Grill (modernized version of old name)
194	45	"The Sound of Falling Music"	Wildfire Bistro	Aurora, Colorado	September 15, 2019	631	0.50
Note: Jon brought in Ami from the Season 3 rescued bar Solids & Stripes (formerly known as Zanzbar) to do recon. New Name: The Prime Bar
195	46	"Saving GI Jodi"	G.I. Jodi's Bar and Grill	Littleton, Colorado	September 22, 2019	630	0.51
New Name: Malloy's Bar and Grill
196	47	"Get Off Your Ass!"	The Fifth	Bountiful, Utah	September 29, 2019	632	0.45
New Name: N/A
