= Bar Rescue season 10 =

Bar Rescue
- Season 10
- No. of episodes: 12

Release
- Original network: Paramount Network
- Original release: February 22 – May 3, 2026

Season chronology
- ← Previous; Season 9

The tenth season of the American reality series Bar Rescue premiered on February 22, 2026, and ended on May 3, 2026, on Paramount Network.

This is the first season since season 8 not to have any guest hosts.

== Experts ==
=== Hospitality ===
- Jon Taffer – Host/Star/Bar Consultant

=== Culinary ===
- Nick Liberato
- Chris Oh
- Kevin Bludso
- Anthony Lamas
- Tatiana Rosana
- Rob Cervoni
- Brad Miller
- Vic Vegas
- Mika Leon

=== Mixology ===
- Alli Torres
- Jennifer Yim
- Diana Small
- Nick Ortega
- Derrick Turner
- Rob Floyd
- Tassia Lacerda
- Rebecca Dowda
- Daniel Ponsky
- Natasha Mesa

== Episodes ==
No. overall	No. in season	Title	Bar name	Location	Guest host	Original release date	Prod. code	Viewers (millions)
290	1	"Sitting Down on the Job"	Main Street Hideaway	Ashland City, Tennessee	N/A	February 22, 2026	1010	0.24
New Name: Kiki's: A Chicago Bar & Grill
291	2	"One Man Brand"	Bar 44	Marietta, Georgia	N/A	February 22, 2026	1006	0.24
New Name: Apex Social
292	3	"When Dreams Hit the Sidewalk"	Game Room & Social Club	Orlando, Florida	N/A	March 1, 2026	1003	0.22
This episode marked the return of Nick Liberato as one of Jon's chef experts; he last appeared in season 4. New Name: The Cask: A Whiskey Bar
293	4	"Alley Cat-astrophe"	Alley Cat Dive Bar	Bowling Green, Kentucky	N/A	March 8, 2026	1012	0.31
New Name: Chase's Garage Bar & Kitchen
294	5	"A Palette of Problems"	The Blu Rose Art Bistro	Douglasville, Georgia	N/A	March 15, 2026	1007	0.26
For recon, Jon brought in Mercedes Varnado and Kevin Undergaro. New Name: Blu Rose Art Bar: Southern Kitchen & Cocktails
295	6	"Don't Leave it to Happenchance"	Happenchance Social Lounge	Nolensville, Tennessee	N/A	March 22, 2026	1011	0.20
Chris Kirkpatrick joins Taffer to watch the recon. New Name: The Regal Room
296	7	"Flush the Slush"	Hurricane Creek Saloon	Melbourne, Florida	N/A	March 29, 2026	1004	0.19
New Name: Neon Rodeo
297	8	"Crust Issues"	Urban Pie	Atlanta, Georgia	N/A	April 5, 2026	1005	0.21
New Name: N/A
298	9	"615 Reasons to Fail"	615 District	Murfreesboro, Tennessee	N/A	April 12, 2026	1009	0.26
New Name: Southern Still: Tennessee Bar & Grill
299	10	"Broken Chains of Command"	VFW Post 8093	DeBary, Florida	N/A	April 19, 2026	1002	N/A
New Name: N/A
300	11	"Hair of the Big Dog"	Big Dog Saloon	Mt. Dora, Florida	N/A	April 26, 2026	1001	N/A
New Name: N/A
301	12	"Havana Rough Time"	Havana Haven Lounge	Powder Springs, Georgia	N/A	May 3, 2026	1008	N/A
New Name: Bimini Bay Island Bar & Grill
