= Bar Rescue season 4 =

Bar Rescue
- Season 4
- Promotional poster for Season 4
- No. of episodes: 58

Release
- Original network: Spike
- Original release: October 5, 2014 – July 31, 2016

Season chronology
- ← Previous; Season 3 Next → Season 5

The fourth season of the American reality show Bar Rescue premiered on Spike on October 5, 2014, at 9/8c except for the third half of the season which aired in the 10/9c time slot. It concluded on July 31, 2016, with a total of 58 episodes. Like the third season, season 4 was also split into multiple parts. It was the longest season of Bar Rescue, having been on the air for nearly two years until season 8.

== Experts ==
- Jon Taffer – Host/Star/Bar Consultant/Recon Spy
- Nicole Taffer – Host's Wife/Marketing/Recon Spy

=== Culinary ===
- Aaron McCargo
- Josh Capon
- Vic "Vic Vegas" Moea
- Nick Liberato
- Gavan Murphy
- Crystal "Chef Pink" DeLongpré
- Jamika Pessoa
- Kevin Bludso
- Tiffany Derry
- Penny Davidi
- Ryan Scott
- Keith Breedlove
- Brendan Collins
- Mike Ferraro

=== Mixology ===
- Phil Wills
- Russell Davis
- Kate Gerwin
- Mia Mastroianni
- Raul Faria
- Gerry Graham
- Lisamarie Joyce
- Kyle Mercado
- Jason Bran
- Neil Witte
- Daniel Ponsky

=== Additional experts ===
- Jessie Barnes – Hospitality
- Renae Lemmens – Entertainment
- Jeff Haywood Sr. – Construction Manager

== Production ==
On May 9, 2013, Spike TV renewed Bar Rescue for a fourth season with additional episodes announced by Spike.

== Episodes ==
No. overall	No. in season	Title	Bar name	Location	Original release date	Prod. code	Viewers (millions)
61	1	"Bug Bite"	Artful Dodger	Huntington, New York	October 5, 2014 (Note: This episode premiered on the Spike app as a sneak preview before its actual airing.)	340	1.03
Jon must teach owners how to promote their business and update their décor and standards, when their fledgling nightclub becomes a hazard due to the owners misguided decision to adopt an 18 and over policy, bringing unruly teens, and a bar so dirty it attracts fruit flies and mosquitoes. New Name: P's & Q's Auto Body (Note: This bar has closed.)
62	2	"Thugs with Mugs"	Undisputed Sports Bar & Grill	Yonkers, New York	October 12, 2014	401	1.17
Rowdy customers at a New York sports bar attack Taffer's crew when they discover they are being served cheap booze at premium prices, prompting Jon to teach the importance of serving quality drinks and maintaining crowd control, but first must contend with an owner whose constant drinking and refusal to take any responsibility for his actions drives his staff to the breaking point. Note: The original airing featured Jon telling the customers that the owners ripped them off for pouring cheap drinks in liquor bottles which caused a fight to breakout after one owner fights with a customer. After this episode aired, the replay version edits this portion out. New Name: SOYO
63	3	"Schmuck Dynasty"	Rhythm & Brews	Staten Island, New York	October 19, 2014	402	1.21
A Staten Island bar that is overrun by a biker gang who are cooking their own food and getting their drinks, due to the owner's inability to stand up to them. Jon must help the owners build the courage to take back their bar and return to their glory days. New Name: 5th & Vine
64	4	"El Moronte!!"	Laguna Lounge	Jersey City, New Jersey	October 26, 2014	403	1.27
Jon must deflate the ego of a passionate Puerto Rican bar owner whose constant berating, boisterous personality, and focusing more on DJing, is not just turning the staff against him, but his own sons as well. New Name: Tres Cuartos (Note: Tres Cuartos modernized their old name and rebranded the bar as Laguna Shots following the rescue.)
65	5	"Anything You Can Yell, I Can Yell Louder"	Jack's Ale House	Sunnyside, New York	November 2, 2014	404	1.32
Jon tries to calm the sparks between three loud-mouthed firefighting brothers struggling to keep their Queens bar afloat, who are more concerned about who gets the last word rather than manage things such as quality control and holding the staff accountable. Note: For the recon, Jon brought in the co-owners of The Bungalow Bar (re-branded as The Bungalow Bar & Restaurant), featured in season 3, episode 24. New Name: Jack's Fire Dept. (modernized version of old name)
66	6	"To Protect and to (Over) Serve"	Lickety Split	Philadelphia, Pennsylvania	November 9, 2014	405	1.06
Jon tries to straighten out a former Philly detective who now owns a bar, and hits the bottle hard after years on the force. Note: The owner's daughter joins Jon to watch the recon and provide inside information on the bar. This is the second episode where the epilogue states that a bar went through another change after Jon's visit (The first was Swanky Bubbles in season 1). This led to the removal of Alleged Bar & Pizza. New Name: 2nd State Lounge/Alleged Bar & Pizza (Note: 2nd State Lounge/Alleged Bar & Pizza was originally two bars but the owner got rid of Alleged Bar & Pizza after the rescue.)
67	7	"A Dash of Bitters"	Plush	Glenside, Pennsylvania	November 16, 2014	406	1.19
Jon uses the help of an owner's ex-wife/former manager to help turn a bar around, due to the owner's bitter attitude and constant tendency to blame her with all the problems. Note: The owner's ex watches the recon with Jon. New Name: Osteria Calabria (Note: Osteria Calabria modernized the name, becoming known as The OC.)
68	8	"Swinging from the Rafters"	Dirty Rooster	Antioch, Illinois	November 23, 2014	407	0.96
Owners Rob and Steve have set up an ambitious bar financed by friend and co-owner Scott. However, Rob has become drunk and disorderly, giving away his liquor and engaging in wild behavior while Scott and Steve do nothing to take control. The recon team is challenged to see how many drinks they can get from Rob for only $5. Posing as a birthday group, they receive numerous shots and walk out without paying a cent. Appalled by Rob's behavior, Jon refuses to enter and sends in his experts to inform Rob of the news. The owners fight with each other and Rob rambles deliriously as he goes to bed. In the stress test, Jon removes Rob and puts him in the kitchen to sober up, while Scott and Steve run the bar. Rob manages to keep is act together and handles the kitchen well, but Scott and Steve have no experience in running the bar and struggle to cope. As a trick, Jon brings in a potential investor who offers to buy out the business. Only Rob outright refuses, which gains Jon's trust. Jon also helps by getting Rob to go to counseling for his drinking habits. After remodeling the bar to a country lodge theme, Rob takes pride in running the bar and succeeds in relaunching the business. Note: While watching the recon, Jon sends his experts to inform the owner he isn't coming to the bar that night. New Name: Lake Marie Lodge (Note: In "Back to the Bar: Meathead-to-Head", Lake Marie Lodge combined the old name and new names, becoming known as Dirty Rooster presents Lake Marie Lodge.)
69	9	"Spoiled Brat Party"	Y-Not III	Milwaukee, Wisconsin	December 7, 2014	408	1.02
The family is a successful bar family, with father Tony and daughter Monica successfully running their own establishments. Son Nick, however, struggles with his own bar, Y-Not III. During recon, he is shown to be disinterested and drinks with the patrons, while the bar has a culture of giving away free drinks. The experts are baffled by the small inventory, especially the lack of Smirnoff vodka, which prompts them to focus on creating cocktails using the drink. Nick shows an appalling amount of bartender skills during training. Jon demotes Nick for the stress test, telling him that he has to earn his way up from being back of the bar, to bartender and to managing. Nick is unable to fulfill the basic duties of fetching ice and cleaning glasses, causing the bar to fall behind. When Nick finally gets promoted to the bar, he is unable to remember the recipes and fumbles the service. Jon is impressed with Nick's cousin, Angelica, who is single-handedly covering the bar. Nick agrees to step away from running the bar and hands over the keys to Angelica. With the stress off of his shoulders, Nick is able to run the front of the bar successfully in the re-opening. Note: Jon brings in the owner's sister, who also runs a bar, to watch the recon and help her brother. New Name: Nick's House
70	10	"Irish Eyes Aren't Smiling"	Packy's Pub	Milwaukee, Wisconsin	December 14, 2014	409	1.03
Jon must help an Irish bar owner, who acts more like an employee and is withholding employee paychecks to keep the business afloat to reignite his spirit plan before the staff quits for good. New Name: Campbell's Irish Pub
71	11	"Second Base, Third Strike"	Second Base	Orange, California	February 8, 2015 (Note: This episode premiered online, on the Spike app and on-demand prior to its airing.)	417	0.87
Jon returns to Second Base (formerly Extremes Bar and Grill, as seen in the second season episode "Bikini Bust") after it goes under for a second time. The bar has fallen into neglect and appears to be in worse condition than when Jon first rescued it. Many of the staff have left and the bartenders have dropped their uniforms to return to bikinis. Jon suspects that manager Gary was at fault for letting the standards slip, but discovers that it is in fact owner Terry who has become disconnected. Terry blames the number of sports bars that have opened and taken their customers, but is slow to reveal that he diverted all the profits from Second Base to his new bar. Jon is furious that Terry has neglected to invest anything back into Second Base. While Jon decides to help the staff improve their skills for their futures, Terry remains uncooperative. Jon proposes a complete rebuild of the bar to remove its tainted reputation, but on the condition that Terry invests his own money. He refuses, and Jon walks out. Note: This is the third episode where the owner watches the recon with Jon. The recon was done by Sarah Colonna and the bar's previous expert Joseph Brooke. Originally going to be the first re-rescue, after the owner refused to put $30,000 of his own money (at the request as a show of commitment to the business) into the concept Jon was originally going to plan (a near-$100,000 renovation), Jon called the owner a slime bucket and walked out. However, Jon will help the bartenders and the manager find new jobs because he still believes in them, but not the owner. New Name: N/A (Note: This bar was not re-rescued.)
72	12	"Crayons & Anger Lines"	Underground Wonder Bar	Chicago, Illinois	February 15, 2015	411	1.14
Jon enforces tough love when a live music bar owner is more concerned with the spirit of wonderment than appealing to her trendy Chicago community. Note: For the recon, Jon brought in the owners from The Blue Frog 22 (re-branded as The Local), featured in the sixth episode of season 1. New Name: \'clear bär\ (Note: This bar reverted to its original following the rescue.)
73	13	"Beach Rats"	Toucans Oceanside Bar & Grill	Hollywood, Florida	February 22, 2015	412	1.20
Jon visits a failing beachfront bar with a rodent problem and is brought to tears upon discovering what the owners have endured. Note: The recon for this episode was done by Jon and his experts. This is the first time he did the recon of a bar. New Name: Bonny and Read's
74	14	"All Twerk & No Pay"	Heat Restaurant & Lounge	Hollywood, Florida	March 1, 2015	413	1.22
Out-of-control bartenders are too busy dancing on the bar to pour drinks and drive away women, and Jon must get the husband and wife owners and general manager to regain control of their staff and put an end to the staff's partying ways. New Name: Ele
75	15	"Bromancing the Stone"	Sandbar Sports Grill	Coconut Grove, Florida	March 8, 2015	414	1.11
Jon visits an outdated college sports bar with an owner who is more interested in managing his fantasy football team than running a business and must get the owner's partner to take control. Note: For the recon, Jon brought in Y-100 DJs Nick and Mack. New Name: The Hot Rock
76	16	"Storming the Castle"	Friar Tucks	Pomona, California	March 15, 2015	415	1.16
A castle-shaped bar with an owner who has anger management issues and is pushing staff to their breaking point, unless Jon can get him to curb his temper. Note: Jon brought in comedian Doug Stanhope to watch the recon with him. This bar appeared in episode twenty four of this season where it served as the location for both the stress test and training for Upland bar The Palace. New Name: Stein Haus Brau & Brats
77	17	"Lagers and Liars"	The Los Angeles Brewing Company	Los Angeles, California	March 22, 2015	416	1.34
Richard owns the family-run Los Angeles Brewing Company who, despite its name, does not brew its own beer. In fact, despite advertising as having 100 beers on tap, most of the lines are out of service and only a handful of beers are served. Jon Taffer sends in two recon teams to see the contrasting service. Jon is recognized and served immediately, but is frustrated by the lack of beers. Maria becomes sick from contaminated beer, while Jon investigates the kitchen after being disgusted with the frozen chicken wings. Meanwhile, the second recon team waits nearly half an hour to be served, and leaves after biting into raw hamburgers. The post-service interview reveals that Richard is not interested in the bar and is financing it through his own glass business, while his nephew Israel is passionate about taking over. Further investigation reveals that the kitchen and draft system haven't been cleaned for months. The stress test is shut down after several minutes when the taps lose pressure and run out of carbon dioxide. Jon introduces the most expensive overhaul by turning the bar into a brewery with in-house craft beers. Richard hands over the bar to Israel. Note: The recon was done by Jon, Maria Menounos and @midnight co-creators Jon Zimelis and Jason Nadler. New Name: LA Brew. Co (modernized version of old name)
78	18	"Loose Lips Loose Tips"	The Holding Company	San Francisco, California	March 29, 2015	419	0.98
Jon must turn the luck of four Irish sisters whose constant bickering and lack of management has caused their San Francisco bar to take a downturn. Note: Director of San Francisco Ent. Commission Jocelyn Kane and Senior Construction Manager Jeff Haywood watched the recon with Jon. New Name: Patriot House
79	19	"Back to the Bar: Hot-Headed Owners"	N/A	N/A	April 5, 2015	993	1.05
Jon revisits Zanzbar, Pat's Cocktails, MoonRunners Saloon, and Piratz Tavern to see if their hot-headed owners continued to fail or succeed without him.
80	20	"Mandala Down"	Mandala Lounge	San Mateo, California	April 12, 2015	418	1.18
Jon butts heads with a self-proclaimed nightlife expert who is troubled by mounting debt, an inflated ego, a chauvinistic attitude towards women, and poor design choices. New Name: 38th Floor
81	21	"Sticky Situation"	Park 77	San Francisco, California	June 21, 2015 (Note: This episode debuted on Amazon Prime, the Spike app and on-demand prior to its airing.)	420	1.08
A family-owned bar faces shutdown due to a son's excessive drinking and resulting bad management, which leads to a sticky and unclean bar, a staff with no leadership, and questionable decision making. Jon must determine if the son can clean up his act and lead the bar, or if his family should take him off management. Note: As of this episode, this was the final appearance of Russell Davis as one of Jon's mixologists as he was never brought back for the remainder of the series as of season 9. New Name: The Lister
82	22	"Take Me Out to the Bar Game"	The Bullpen Bar	Sparks, Nevada	June 28, 2015	421	1.40
Jon must help retired professional baseball player turned bar owner Dan Serafini be a leader when he allows his staff to be over intoxicated and give away all his profits. New Name: Oak Tavern
83	23	"Emergency Exit"	Murphy's Law Irish Pub	Reno, Nevada	July 5, 2015	422	1.26
Jon tries to navigate a turbulent partnership between an ex-pilot, his ex-girlfriend and the other partner, whose relationship is affecting the business of the bar due to the owner's inability to move on with his relationship with his ex, who does nothing and takes advantage of him. New Name: Money Bar
84	24	"It's Always Sunny in Portland"	Six Point Inn	Portland, Oregon	July 12, 2015	425	1.20
Jon tries to help fix a Portland bar with an owner and his step-daughter who don't work together, and criticize each other and the staff, while also dealing with a very stubborn chef. Note: The stepfather watched the recon with Jon. New Name: Over Easy Bar & Breakfast
85	25	"Brokedown Palace"	The Palace	Upland, California	July 19, 2015	423	1.21
Alexander Siddig and Iddo Goldberg help Jon rescue a Moroccan bar with an identity crisis due to conflicting interior and exterior designs. The problems worsen when he discovers a staff untrained in Moroccan cuisine and proper bartender methods and a chef who does not follow sanitary procedures. Note: This episode premiered an hour early as the lead-in for the Spike miniseries Tut which featured Siddig and Goldberg who both acted as recon spies while wearing an earpiece that was given to them by Jon so that he can talk to them. Due to the extensive redesign work needed, the stress test and the training both took place at Friar Tucks (re-branded as Stein Haus Brau & Brats, featured in the sixteenth episode). New Name: Menara
86	26	"Ants with Wings, Bro!"	Tonic Lounge	Portland, Oregon	July 26, 2015	424	1.08
Jon helps a failing Portland music venue that has an ant infestation, a staff that has no mixology experience and an owner who is more interested in the music than managing his bar. New Name: Panic Room Bar (Note: Panic Room Bar changed its name to The Raven.)
87	27	"Back to the Bar: Stubborn Owners"	N/A	N/A	August 2, 2015	991	1.22
Jon revisits Sorties Tavern, O'Face Bar, Canyon Inn, and Spirits on Bourbon to see if their stubborn owners continued to fail or succeed without him.
88	28	"Put a Cork in It"	Brix Wine Bar	Sunset Beach, California	August 9, 2015	430	1.10
One eccentric wine bar owner is too occupied to notice his business is withering on the vine. Note: For the recon, Jon brought in Maria Menounos and Keven Undergaro who both wore ear pieces which allows Jon to talk to them. New Name: Pacific Coast Wine Bar
89	29	"Too Many Managers, Not Enough Man"	Pro's Sports Bar	Country Club Hills, Illinois	August 16, 2015	410	1.04
Jon battles a management-heavy staff that disrespects their owner at a suburban Chicago sports bar with their attitudes and constant arguing, not helped by the owner's overbearing management style. Note: For the recon, Jon brought in Dan & Dave from Barstool Sports. New Name: BR Steak
90	30	"Jon Ain't Afraid of No Ghost"	Myerz PourHouse	El Cajon, California	August 23, 2015	427	1.08
In order to save a haunted bar with a cursed past, Jon is forced to stir up a different type of spirit than he is used to. Note: For the recon, Jon brought in Matt Mira from The Nerdist Podcast and Jordan Morris from Jordan, Jesse, Go!. A medium was brought in to help the staff deal with the haunted element. New Name: The Study
91	31	"Back to the Bar: Delusional Owners"	N/A	N/A	August 30, 2015	992	1.14
Jon revisits Dimples, Taza Nightclub, 22 Klicks Bar & Grill, and Metal & Lace to see if their delusional owners continued to fail or succeed without him.
92	32	"Til Debt Do Us Part"	Caribe Night Club	San Diego, California	October 4, 2015	429	0.81
A womanizing and ignorant owner and his enraged wife struggle with their run-down Caribbean bar. Jon tries to turn the bar around before the business hits the rocks and the owner's wife bails for good, but first must get the owner to recognize his problems, which is easier said than done. Note: This episode debuted in the show's new 10/9c slot. For the recon, Jon brought in AfterBuzz TV host Ashley Daniels and Pulsar 107.3 DJ Mario Alberto. The owner's wife also joins Jon to watch the recon. In a Back to the Bar special, it was shown that the bar continues to thrive and has even expanded. In the special, video of a surprise visit by one of Jon's experts is shown where she determines the place really is doing good. The owner and his wife's marriage is shown to be doing far better and he admits that Jon really got through to him about his behavior. New Name: La Luz Ultra Lounge
93	33	"Shamrocks and Shenanigans"	Molly Malone's	Ramona, California	October 11, 2015	426	0.73
Jon attempts to fix an Irish bar, with an owner who would rather drink and party than manage his bar with bartenders who constantly bicker due to no management, which irks his girlfriend to no end. New Name: Way Point Saloon
94	34	"Blowing Royal Smoke"	Royal Oaks	Youngstown, Ohio	October 18, 2015	431	0.89
Feuding brothers' obnoxious behavior drives away customers at the oldest bar and BBQ joint in Youngstown, Ohio. Jon tries to put the fire back in their bellies before the business goes up in smoke, and they destroy a great legacy. Note: Jon watched the recon with Youngstown mayor John McNally. His recon spies also get so disgusted that they walk out of the bar during the recon. New Name: N/A (Note: This bar kept its original name.)
95	35	"Sour Lemons and Bitter Business"	Martini Brothers Burger Bar	Youngstown, Ohio	October 25, 2015	432	0.85
A landlord and partner, who would rather paint fruit in the name of art than save his failing Ohio burger bar, clashes with bitter owners. Jon must determine whether the owner has the heart to run his bar or if he should get out of the partnership. New Name: The Federal
96	36	"Ripper's Rookie House"	Ripper's Rock House	Akron, Ohio	November 1, 2015	433	0.71
Former Judas Priest frontman turned bar owner Tim "Ripper" Owens calls on Jon to amp up his struggling live music venue when his employees treat it more like a jam session than a business. Note: Owens joins Jon to watch the recon, making this episode the first where Jon watched the recon with the co-owner. Shawn Ford, who was a bar patron at the end of this episode, would then become one of Jon's mixologists starting with the episode "Land of the Beer and Home of the Misbehaved". New Name: Tim Owens' Traveler's Tavern
97	37	"Big Sister's Watching"	Filling Station Pub	San Diego, California	November 8, 2015	428	0.86
Jon has a big face-off against a distrustful owner of a military-themed bar, who is disrespectful towards her staff and spends more time spying and scapegoating them than training them. Note: For the recon, Jon brought in Mike Costa & Dave Palet from Xtra 1360 Fox Sports San Diego. This is the first episode Jon dealt with a Hong Kong Cantonese owner. This was also the final appearance of Chef expert Nick Liberato until season 10. New Name: Off Base Bar
98	38	"Vulgar Vixens"	The Hooch	Dearborn Heights, Michigan	November 15, 2015	434	1.04
Jon confronts a foul-mouthed owner in a failing Michigan bar with a confusing theme, whose vulgarity and rudeness drives away female customers and degrades her staff. New Name: Proving Ground
99	39	"Unnecessary Toughness"	The Arena	Ann Arbor, Michigan	November 22, 2015	435	0.86
Jon is forced to deal with the hot-headed owner of a college alumni bar whose fiery temper and rude behavior keeps his staff on edge and patrons away. Note: Mike Flore, the owner of the Arena, was sentenced to up to five years in prison in July 2016 for failing to pay ten years worth of sales taxes totaling up to over $700,000, thus resulting in the closure of the bar. New Name: N/A
100	40	"Boss Lady Blues"	Jazz Katz	Southfield, Michigan	December 6, 2015	436	0.82
Jon helps a former psychologist who now runs a Detroit jazz club, but her interfering family undermines her leadership and allows her staff to be lazy and complacent. Note: For the recon, Jon brought in Grammy and Emmy award winning Jazz bassist Robert Hurst. New Name: Back Beat
101	41	"Bare Rescue"	Chix on Dix	Detroit, Michigan	December 13, 2015	437	1.03
Jon helps a failing Detroit strip club with a violate work environment, a staff without standards, and a manager who struggles to run the business. New Name: Power Strip
102	42	"Back to the Bar: No Laughing Matter"	N/A	N/A	December 20, 2015	260	0.85
In a special "Back to the Bar" that was taped in front of a live audience, Jon revisits Jack's Fire Department to see if the McGowan brothers have cooled off their fiery relationship. He also revisits Chilleen's on 17 to see if the owners have improved with service and not drinking behind the bar, then takes on an angry stand-up comedy club owner from Stand Up Scottsdale.
103	43	"Hard Heads and Softballs"	Mac & Chester's SRO	Anoka, Minnesota	March 6, 2016	438	0.89
Jon settles the score between two feuding bar owners, with one refusing to even enter his bar because of his partner's outrageous behavior and hard-drinking friends, despite his marriage being on the line. Note: This episode is billed as the show's 100th episode, despite it being seemingly the 98th in production order and 103rd in airing order. There was also a hidden "running gag" throughout the episode when the owners Todd and then Scott later in the episode will leave the bar in their respective vehicles. Elise was the only owner to not leave the bar. New Name: Boulder Lodge
104	44	"Dragon Lady"	Van Goghz	St. Louis Missouri	March 13, 2016	441	1.10
Jon attempts to help an inexperienced martini bar owner whose apathetic and combative attitude has resulted in her bar to hit sub-standard conditions and numerous face-offs with her staff, including a fed-up chef in the kitchen. Note: As of this episode, this was the final appearance of Chef Pink. New Name: Crafted.
105	45	"Paradise Lost"	Dale 1891	Tampa, Florida	March 20, 2016	444	0.96
An owner's son faces Jon's fury, when he discovers that the son has been mismanaging his family's bar and embezzling money from his father and fellow business partner. Now Jon must figure out if the son can get his act together or if his father should let go from the business. Note: For the recon, Jon and his experts used the Villagio Cinemas which is located next door to the bar and has the same owners. As such, the team used one of the cinema's movie screens rather than watching it on a computer in Jon's vehicle. When the losses per month are reported as usual during the start of the episode, it is reported as only $5,000 a month. Jon later learns that that number represents only the rent that isn't being paid and isn't an accurate figure and has two of the owners spend the night figuring it out, leading to Jon discovering that the managing partner has been charging all sorts of personal expenses to the bar something that is fraud and embezzlement. Jon states that the bank statement he is shown in this instance is the most incriminating set of information against a manager he has ever seen. New Name: Cayman Cove
106	46	"Back to the Bar: Meathead-to-Head"	N/A	N/A	March 27, 2016	261	0.88
Jon revisits the Dirty Rooster and ruffles the feathers of owner Rob, then revisits the End Zone to mediate a muscle-bound dispute between two rival bar owners.
107	47	"Land of the Beer and Home of the Misbehaved"	O’Kelleys Irish Pub	St. Louis, Missouri	April 3, 2016	442	0.99
After a downtown expansion, a successful St. Louis restaurant owner could lose everything as her out-of-control nephew and unqualified manager run her sports bar into the ground, unless Jon can get them in line. Note: For the recon, Jon brought in defensive end Chris Long of the St. Louis Rams, who had moved back to Los Angeles by the time the episode aired, and Barstool Sports blogger Dan Katz. This is also the fourth episode where the owner watched the recon with Jon. Andrea Ervin, the owner of O'Kelley's, is also the owner of Mama Campisi's, which was featured on Restaurant: Impossible in 2013. New Name: Pastimes on 4th
108	48	"Getting Freaki at the Tiki"	Freaki Tiki	Clearwater, Florida	April 10, 2016	446	1.18
Jon's discovers severe owner neglect at a rundown tiki bar when he discovers a used condom, major sewage problems and owners more interested in partying. Note: For the recon, Jon brings in the former owners of Piratz Tavern and their daughter, featured in the season two premiere and "Back to the Bar: Hot Head Owners". The Bar Rescue editors missed it on the closing screen, the bar doesn't want more "cost-umers", they want to attract customers back in. New name: Frankie T's (Note: Frankie T's modernized the name, becoming known as Frankie T's Dive Bar.)
109	49	"Back to the Bar: Empty Pockets"	N/A	N/A	April 17, 2016	262	0.86
Jon revisits MT Bottle to see if they still have empty pockets. It is revealed in this episode that the bar tweaked their name to "MT Bottles & Cans", bartender Nikki (known for flashing a customer during the initial recon) appeared and revealed she no longer works there and has left for a higher paying warehouse job. Also, the bar lost their liquor license again as the county ruled the bar was outside their jurisdiction (by only about 300 feet). Jon encourages viewers to sign a petition to have the ruling overturned. The former owners of Piratz Tavern appear once again and appear to make amends with Jon and the bar is now closed. However, they reveal plans to open a new bar in Orlando called "Bar Refuge". Jon then has Chef Pink and Sal from Over Easy Bar & Breakfast compete in a gravy grudge match, which Sal loses but refuses to accept defeat. Finally, Jon revisits Underground Wonder Bar and learns that owner Lonie has changed the bar's name back but has kept the rest of the changes that Jon made.
110	50	"How to Train the Dragon"	George & Dragon	Phoenix, Arizona	April 24, 2016	448	0.85
After the tragic loss of his mother, the owner of this British pub has coped poorly by drinking away profits and gambling his way to ruin with weekly poker tournaments. Now his brother calls upon Jon to help him clean up his act. New Name: N/A
111	51	"Demolition Man"	Grinders	Santa Clarita, California	May 1, 2016	440	1.07
The city threatens to shut down a bar after the owner unsafely renovates without a permit. Jon attempts to school the clueless rookie owner and bring the construction disaster up to code before the city intervenes. New Name: The Cajun Belle (Note: This bar has been sold.)
112	52	"Back to the Bar: The Luck of the Irish"	N/A	N/A	May 8, 2016	263	0.63
Jon revisits Bungalow Bar to reveal his most successful rescue ever, tests the luck of Campbell's Irish Pub after his rescue, and revisits the Lister. Campbell's has been profiting well with the owner and manager working well together. However, Jon shows what really happened with the Lister, when the owner's assistant general manager promise to keep his word to stay sober but mixing the renovations that Jon made.
113	53	"We're Gonna Need a Bigger Boat"	The Bridge Lounge	Tarpon Springs, Florida	May 15, 2016	445	1.07
Jon helps a grieving family rescue their late father's fisherman themed bar following the BP oil disaster and the father's passing, while also dealing with his family's feuding with their business partner, who has taken advantage of the brother's grief and offered nothing but poor ideas. Note: Jon watched the recon with PGA Tour golfer John Daly who's engaged to the bar's co-owner. In addition, he also brought in 93.3 FLZ DJs Brody & Rose to act as recon spies. New Name: N/A
114	54	"Danny Sits on His Fanny"	Cirivello's Bar	Long Beach, California	May 22, 2016	449	0.89
After convincing his friends to invest their life savings, a novice bar owner transformed a community staple into a bottomless money pit and does nothing to fix it. Now Jon must get the investors to step up and take control before they lose their money for good. Note: As of this episode, this was the final appearance of Chef expert Brendan Collins. New Name: Aging Room at Cirivello's (modernized version of old name)
115	55	"Gone in a Flash"	City Bistro	St. Louis, Missouri	July 10, 2016	443	0.99
A manager turned bar owner struggles to keep her business floating due to her drunk and promiscuous staff's out of control behavior and their reputation that keeps patrons out. Now it's up to Jon to help clean up this bar's reputation and help the owner become more assertive in her business. New Name: The Beechwood
116	56	"Momster's Ball" (Note: Breastaurant Rescue was the episode's original title.)	Baseline Sports Bar	Tempe, Arizona	July 17, 2016	447	0.92
An owner relies on her attractive daughters and spaghetti wrestling events to lure customers inside, but mounting debt and a family feud threaten the future. Jon must find a more profitable marketing plan and mend the fence with the owner's family if he is to save this bar. Note: For the recon, Jon brought in Brandy Beavers from Stand Up Scottsdale! (featured in season 3, episode 10). Jon also arrived at the wrong bar originally because there was another bar with the same name in the area. During the stress test, Jon set up a challenge for the staff to make a $1,000 profit. After the staff only made $990, Jon chipped in the last $10 himself to ensure they met the challenge. New Name: Brick and Barley
117	57	"Drunk on Punk"	Black Light District Rock & Roll Lounge	Long Beach, California	July 24, 2016	450	1.07
Jon is forced to make a tough decision on rescuing a bar when its resistant owner refuses to give up his punk rock obsession in favor of more profiting-making choices. Note: For the recon, Jon brought in The Vandals bassist Joe Escalante, in addition to actress Sarah Colonna and her fiancée and Seattle Seahawks punter, Jon Ryan. Due to the owner's complete resistance to change and delusion that he knew better than Jon, this became the third bar Jon has refused to help; the first two being O'Face Bar and the re-rescue of Second Base. Also, this is the first Bar Rescue that featured cocktails not available because an owner refused to allow them at his establishment. New Name: N/A (Note: This bar was not rescued.)
118	58	"Raising Arizona"	The Gallopin' Goose	Coolidge, Arizona	July 31, 2016	439	1.03
An owner's illicit affair produces a child, and destroys both his marriage and the reputation of his bar. Now it's up to Jon to help him deal with his past demons and start a clean slate. Note: Jon watched the recon with the owner's wife. New Name: N/A
