= Bar Rescue season 7 =

Bar Rescue
- Season 7
- Promotional poster for Season 7
- No. of episodes: 16

Release
- Original network: Paramount Network
- Original release: March 1 – September 13, 2020

Season chronology
- ← Previous; Season 6 Next → Season 8

The seventh season of the American reality series Bar Rescue premiered on March 1, 2020, and ended on September 13, 2020, on Paramount Network.

== Experts ==
- Jon Taffer – Host/Star/Bar Consultant

=== Culinary ===
- Jason Santos
- Tiffany Derry
- Kevin Bludso
- Vic Vegas
- Anthony Lamas
- Ryan Scott

=== Mixology ===
- Mia Mastroianni
- Ashley Clark
- Derrick Turner
- Alex Goode
- Amy Koffsky
- Tommy Palmer
- Rob Floyd

=== Additional experts ===
- Jillian Schmitz – dance expert

== Episodes ==
No. overall	No. in season	Title	Bar name	Location	Original release date	Prod. code	Viewers (millions)
197	1	"Sactown Going Down"	SacTown Sports Bar & Grill	Sacramento, California	March 1, 2020	710	0.61
For recon, Jon brought in rapper and singer T-Pain. New Name: Brannan Manor
198	2	"Gutterball!"	Lucky 66 Bowl	Albuquerque, New Mexico	March 8, 2020	705	0.62
Jon is called in to rescue a bowling alley and bar run by a Vietnam veteran whose bad attitude drove away his own beloved granddaughter. Jon helps to put the family back together while saving the business. In addition, before he leaves, Jon gives the owner $10,000 of his own money to help cover payroll and expenses until the profits come in, something that Jon has only ever done once before in his entire life. New Name: The Great 66 Entertainment Center
199	3	"Breaking Brandon"	Linda Lou's Time For Two	Layton, Utah	March 15, 2020	702	0.58
New Name: Purser's Bar
200	4	"Still Bill"	The Union	Midvale, Utah	March 22, 2020	703	0.57
New Name: The Midway
201	5	"Saving Post 6216"	VFW Post 6216	Albuquerque, New Mexico	March 29, 2020	706	0.57
New Name: N/A
202	6	"Life's a Beach"	The Sandbar Brewery & Grill	Albuquerque, New Mexico	April 5, 2020	704	0.62
New Name: Playa Island Bar
203	7	"Taken for Granted"	The Grant Bar & Lounge	Tracy, California	April 12, 2020	707	0.65
New Name: Leia's Restaurant, Lounge & Nightclub
204	8	"Come Home to Roost"	The Broadway Club	Tooele, Utah	April 19, 2020	701	0.61
New Name: The Roost Bar
205	9	"Beast Rescue"	Rob Ben's Restaurant & Lounge	Emeryville, California	April 26, 2020	709	0.74
New Name: N/A
206	10	"Raging Turkey"	Kalaveraz Cocina-Cantina	Escondido, California	May 3, 2020	712	0.64
New Name: Sierra Madre Cantina
207	11	"In the Rough"	Pepe's Mexican Restaurant & Cantina	Canyon Lake, California	May 17, 2020	713	0.56
New Name: Par Bar
208	12	"Bottoms Up, Going Down"	Bottoms Up Bar & Grill	Stanton, California	May 31, 2020	715	0.56
Note: For recon, Jon brought in Maria Menounos and Keven Undergaro New Name: N/A
209	13	"A Silver Dollar Saved Is a Silver Dollar Earned"	Silver Dollar	Chula Vista, California	June 7, 2020	711	0.51
New Name: N/A
210	14	"Fear and Molding on Pineapple Hill"	Pineapple Hill Grill	Tustin, California	June 14, 2020	714	0.57
New Name: Renz Social House
211	15	"The Gaslamp Redemption"	Jolt'n Joe's	San Diego, California	September 6, 2020	708	0.46
New Name: The Gaslamp Social
212	16	"The Mother of All Failures"	Armadillo Grill	Phoenix, Arizona	September 13, 2020	716	0.46
New Name: Brenda's Inferno
