= Bar Rescue season 9 =

Bar Rescue
- Season 9
- Promotional poster for Season 9
- No. of episodes: 40

Release
- Original network: Paramount Network
- Original release: February 25, 2024 – June 29, 2025

Season chronology
- ← Previous; Season 8 Next → Season 10

The ninth season of the American reality series Bar Rescue premiered on February 25, 2024, and ended on June 29, 2025, on Paramount Network. Like other prior seasons, season nine was also split into multiple parts.

This is the only season to feature an expert filling in for Jon Taffer in some rescues.

== Experts ==
=== Hospitality ===
- Jon Taffer – Host/Star/Bar Consultant
- Phil Wills – Guest Host/Mixologist/Bar Consultant
- Ashish Alfred – Guest Host/Chef
- Dustin Drai – Guest Host/Consultant
- Spike Mendelsohn – Guest Host/Chef
- Jason Santos – Guest Host/Chef

=== Restaurateur ===
- Danny Trejo – Guest Host/Actor

=== Culinary ===
- Tatiana Rosana
- Jennifer Murphy
- Michael Ferraro
- Vic Vegas
- Anthony Lamas
- Chris Oh
- Brad Miller
- Tony Gemignani
- Kevin Bludso

=== Mixology ===
- Tassia Lacerda
- Rob Floyd
- Mia Mastroianni
- Moses Laboy
- Troy Clarke
- Nick Ortega
- Rebecca Dowda
- Carlos Ruiz
- Derrick Turner
- Diana Small
- Alli Torres
- Daniel Ponsky

== Episodes ==
No. overall	No. in season	Title	Bar name	Location	Guest host	Original release date	Prod. code	Viewers (millions)
250	1	"Deadliest Kitchen"	Skip & Jan's Sports Bar	Gilbert, Arizona	N/A	February 25, 2024	906	0.24
Note: For recon, Jon brought in Arizona Coyotes announcers Matt McConnell and Tyson Nash. New Name: Natalie's
251	2	"Wildkats Wild Collapse"	Wildkat Records Bar & Grill	Jacksonville, Florida	N/A	March 3, 2024	911	0.34
At the conclusion of the episode, there is a dedication to the late Jared March, producer of MTV's The Challenge, which was then accompanied by his message followed by a link to The Jmared Foundation. Note: For recon, Jon brought in Tracey McKay (DJ Doctor Doom) and Kevin Bodie. New Name: Bay Street Sports Grill
252	3	"Jason's Last Call"	Hogwash Saloon	Fountain Hills, Arizona	N/A	March 3, 2024	909	0.35
New Name: Skybox Ultra Lounge
253	4	"A Drunk, a Fruitfly, and a KnightWalk Into a Bar"	The Thirsty Ox	Oxnard, California	Phil Wills	March 17, 2024	904	0.28
Note: The recon was done by Maria Menounos and Keven Undergaro who both attended the grand re-opening of Thirsty Ox's new bar. New Name: Foxy Ox (modernized version of old name) (Note: This bar reverted to its original following the rescue.)
254	5	"Low Five Dive"	High 5 Grille	Tucson, Arizona	N/A	March 24, 2024	910	0.40
Note: On January 25, 2024, a local news article stated that this bar had closed right before this episode even aired. The bar closed on January 3, 2 months after filming as this episode was filmed around November of last year. New Name: Cinco (Note: This bar has closed.)
255	6	"Missing the Marc"	Arnold's	St. Augustine, Florida	Ashish Alfred	March 31, 2024	913	0.37
New Name: N/A (Note: This bar kept its original name.)
256	7	"My Brother's Barkeeper"	Finesse Lounge	Banning, California	N/A	April 7, 2024	902	0.25
New Name: '47 Social
257	8	"A Perla in the Rough"	La Perla Sports Cantina	Glendale, Arizona	Dustin Drai	April 14, 2024	907	0.24
New Name: La Perla Sports Club (modernized version of old name)
258	9	"Losing the Playoffs"	Playoffs Sports Lounge	Palm Desert, California	N/A	April 21, 2024	901	0.32
New Name: N/A
259	10	"Friends Without Benefits"	Epic Lounge	Downey, California	Phil Wills	April 28, 2024	905	0.29
New Name: Epic Live/Epic Bites (modernized version of old name)
260	11	"Boca Re-Tune"	One11 Boca Raton	Boca Raton, Florida	N/A	May 5, 2024	917	0.31
New Name: Boca Luna Luxe Lounge
261	12	"CSI: Los Cocos"	Los Cocos	Port St. Lucie, Florida	Ashish Alfred	May 12, 2024	916	0.26
New Name: Three Tides
262	13	"From Camo to Cocktail"	VFW Post 1689	Jacksonville, Florida	N/A	May 19, 2024	912	0.30
New Name: N/A
263	14	"Thank You for (Not) Smoking"	Gerri’s Sports Pub	Margate, Florida	N/A	June 2, 2024	919	0.35
New Name: Jerzy's Pub
264	15	"Inland Tavern, Underwater"	Inland Tavern	San Marcos, California	Phil Wills	June 9, 2024	903	0.34
New Name: Shores Bar + Kitchen
265	16	"Dancing Dreams Dashed"	Cielo Lounge	Port St. Lucie, Florida	N/A	June 16, 2024	915	0.42
New Name: Don Marcos Cantina
266	17	"Mis-Steaks Were Made"	Tumbleweed Grill & Bar	Apache Junction, Arizona	Dustin Drai	June 23, 2024	908	0.36
New Name: Gold Rush Saloon
267	18	"Feels Bad at Philgoods"	Dr. Philgoods Sports Bar	Pompano Beach, Florida	N/A	June 30, 2024	918	0.29
New Name: Dr. Philgoods Laboratory Bar and Grill
268	19	"Long Island Mess"	Uncle Albert's Pub	Houston, Texas	Danny Trejo & Phil Wills	July 14, 2024	924	0.28
New Name: Big W Cattle Co
269	20	"Lost in the Sauce"	Nico's	Kingwood, Texas	N/A	July 21, 2024	920	N/A
New Name: Kingwood Neapolitan Kitchen & Bar
270	21	"Till the Wagon Wheels Fall Off"	The Wagon Wheel	Cleveland, Texas	Danny Trejo & Phil Wills	July 28, 2024	923	0.26
New Name: The Pour Station High Octane Cocktails & Food
271	22	"Midtown Slump"	Coaches Pub	Houston, Texas	N/A	August 4, 2024	921	0.24
New Name: Midtown Pub Steak & Sports
272	23	"Jimmy Meet World"	Interlude II: Bar & Grill	Kenosha, Wisconsin	N/A	February 23, 2025	936	0.29
New Name: N/A
273	24	"Lights Out in the Harbor"	Harbor Lights	Sheboygan, Wisconsin	Spike Mendelsohn	March 2, 2025	938	0.29
New Name: N/A
274	25	"Rock Bottom at Top Shelf"	Top Shelf Sports Bar & Grille	Fond du Lac, Wisconsin	Donnie Wahlberg	March 9, 2025	939	0.33
Note: Donnie Wahlberg joins Jon for recon. New Name: Blue Line Tavern
275	26	"Pete's Ruined Tavern"	Pete's Cutting Board Reuben Tavern & Grill	Chesterfield, Michigan	Jason Santos	March 16, 2025	926	0.25
New Name: Pete's Butcher Block Bar (modernized version of old name)
276	27	"I'm a F'n Bar Guy! I'm a F'n Bar Girl!"	Daq Shack	Milwaukee, Wisconsin	N/A	March 23, 2025	937	0.24
Note: This episode wasn't advertised to air that week, "Tropical Storm" was originally scheduled to be in place of this, as clips were advertised on Bar Rescue's and Jon Taffer's Instagram pages. for unknown reasons, that episode was pulled at the last minute in favor of this one. New Name: Royal Street MKE
277	28	"Backroads to Ruin"	Backroads Bar & Grill	Holly, Michigan	Phil Wills	March 30, 2025	927	0.23
New Name: Taylor's Tavern Bar & Kitchen
278	29	"Oh Brother, Where Art Thou?"	Brothers on Main	St. Clair, Missouri	Jason Santos	April 6, 2025	932	0.28
New Name: Blue Velvet Cocktail Lounge & Kitchen
279	30	"Honey, I Bought a Bar!"	Bar 8	Houston, Texas	N/A	April 13, 2025	922	0.25
New Name: Legacy Bar
280	31	"The Airliner is Grounded"	The Airliner Bar & Grill	East Alton, Illinois	Spike Mendelsohn	April 20, 2025	934	0.23
Note: This episode marks the return of Daniel Ponsky as one of Jon's mixologists. Ponsky was last seen in Season 5. New Name: The Airliner Neighborhood Diner & Bar (modernized version of old name)
281	32	"Calendar's Crisis"	Calendar's Pizzeria	Macclenny, Florida	Danny Trejo	April 27, 2025	914	0.29
New Name: Terri's Italian Kitchen & Bar
282	33	"On the 3:10 to Failure"	CJ's Pub & Grill	Smithton, Illinois	N/A	May 4, 2025	931	0.19
Note: Jon did recon alongside Reed Low and Cam Janssen. New Name: Smithton Station Classic Kitchen & Cocktails
283	34	"Out of the Frying Pan, Into the Fireplace"	The Fireplace	St. Louis, Missouri	Spike Mendelsohn	May 11, 2025	935	0.23
New Name: The Fireplace Bar & Kitchen (modernized version of old name)
284	35	"Bad Times at Goodtime"	Jon's Goodtime Bar & Grill	Inkster, Michigan	Phil Wills	May 18, 2025	925	0.25
New Name: Brothers Smokehouse Bar & BBQ
285	36	"Tropical Storm"	Tropic	Milwaukee, Wisconsin	N/A	June 1, 2025	940	0.20
Note: NBA player Bobby Portis joins Jon to watch the recon while the former's brother and mentor acted as recon spies. New Name: Montego Bay Beach Club
286	37	"Murky Waters at Swamp Tales"	Swamp Tales Bar & Restaurant	Carlyle, Illinois	Jason Santos	June 8, 2025	933	0.30
New Name: Swamp Town Cajun Kitchen & Cocktails
287	38	"The World Famous Raw Chicken Wings"	Pat & Dandy's Sports Bar & Grill	Toledo, Ohio	Phil Wills	June 15, 2025	929	0.25
New Name: Pat & Dandy's Sports (Central) Bar & Grill (modernized version of old name)
288	39	"Third Time's the Charm"	Club 21	Goodells, Michigan	Dustin Drai	June 22, 2025	928	N/A
New Name: Rix Ranch Bar & Grill
289	40	"Slotzy's Last Shotzy"	Slotzy's Gaming Bar & Grill	Worden, Illinois	N/A	June 29, 2025	930	0.18
Note: Kat Timpf joined Taffer for recon. Taffer previously appeared on Gutfeld! with her. New Name: Vitale's Hideaway
