= Bar Rescue season 5 =

Bar Rescue
- Season 5
- Promotional poster for Season 5
- No. of episodes: 31

Release
- Original network: Spike
- Original release: August 7, 2016 – September 17, 2017

Season chronology
- ← Previous; Season 4 Next → Season 6

The fifth season of the American reality series Bar Rescue aired on Spike on August 7, 2016, and ended on September 17, 2017, with a total of 31 episodes. The first three episodes aired at 9/8c, before moving to 10/9c for the remainder of the season. As with previous seasons, season 5 was also split into multiple parts.

== Experts ==
- Jon Taffer – Host/Star/Bar Consultant
- Samantha "Sam" Taffer – Host's Daughter/Mixologist/Recon Spy

=== Culinary ===
- Ryan Scott
- Aaron McCargo
- Jason Santos
- Vic Vegas
- Tiffany Derry
- Michael Ferraro
- Sean Olnowich

=== Mixology ===
- Lisamarie Joyce
- Shawn Ford
- Rob Floyd
- Phil Wills
- David Vaughn
- Mia Mastroianni
- Daniel Ponsky
- Ashley Clark
- Derrick Turner

== Production ==
In May 2015, Taffer confirmed on his Facebook that a fifth season was in the works. On July 27, 2016, Spike greenlit the fifth season along with a late-night talk show pilot from Taffer. Season 5 also featured ten new Back to the Bar episodes with never-before-seen footage of the experts visiting the previously rescued bars in addition to Taffer revisiting past confrontations with the memorable owners he faced during his visit.

== Episodes ==
No. overall	No. in season	Title	Bar name	Location	Original release date	Prod. code	Viewers (millions)
119	1	"The Perks of Being a Wallpaper"	Champagne's Cafe	Las Vegas, Nevada	August 7, 2016	502	0.90
A classic dive bar with mob ties in Las Vegas is about to close its doors because of an owner who's busy being a nice guy rather than a wise guy, and allowing his employees to do whatever they want. Note: This episode features commentary from former Hole-in-the-Wall gang leader Frank Cullotta who occasionally visits the bar. He also appeared during the grand re-opening. New Name: Champagne's (modernized version of old name)
120	2	"Wheels of Misfortune"	The Wheel House Bar	Hemet, California	August 14, 2016	504	1.01
Jon helps a hometown hero of a desert town rescue his roller rink bar from his unruly staff and management that displays pushover authority. Note: For the recon, Jon brought in AfterBuzz TV founder Keven Undergaro. New Name: Derby's Bar & Grill
121	3	"12 Beers a Slave/Whipped Into Shape"	City Bar	Las Vegas, Nevada	August 21, 2016	501	1.01
After gambling his life savings on a run down Las Vegas bar, a desperate owner tries out a fetish night to whip up new business. Note: Jon watched the recon with the owner of the bar. New Name: The Bradley (Note: This bar has closed.)
122	4	"Antisocial Media"	Celebrities Sports Grill	Yucaipa, California	September 18, 2016	503	0.78
Celebrities is run by brothers Max and Ryke. Both were contractors working for the Department of Defense and were deployed overseas, with Ryke being severely wounded by a grenade. Max opened the bar, but developed a hostile, antagonistic reputation with the local community over social media due to controversy over a homeless veterans fund he started. Jon sends in a group of patrons who were publicly attacked by Max over social media, and Max's hostile attitude turns the crowd against him, with Max defiantly refusing to acknowledge his mistakes. Jon begins a process of conflict resolution, giving Max the opportunity to apologise to his staff. Community members are then invited the following night, voting to support Max after good service and a positive attitude change. The re-branded and renovated bar opens to a good reception from the locals. Six weeks later, Max organises a grand opening, announcing that he is donating the $20,000 fund money to the Semper Fi Fund for veterans. New Name: The Victory Bar & Restaurant
123	5	"How to Train Your Goldfish"	YNot Sports Pub & Grub	Everett, Washington	September 25, 2016	506	0.68
A staffing crisis hits a sports pub before the stress test, leaving the owners without any employees. Now Jon must determine if he can salvage the night or make a risky decision. Note: Due to the need to hire a new staff (the old bartenders were fired and the old chef quit in protest), Jon doesn't hold a stress test but rather an audition to determine who will make up the new staff. Jon calls it their first ever Bartending Audition. New Name: The Forbidden Pub (Note: This bar reverted to its original name following the rescue.)
124	6	"Win, Lose or Brawl"	Russell City Grill & Sports Bar	Hayward, California	October 2, 2016	508	0.76
Jon tries to corral an out-of-control staff and the owner's freeloading friends, and a violent physical fight threatens the bar's rescue potential. New Name: Fogline Bar & Grill
125	7	"Listen Y'all It's Sabotage"	Schafer's Bar & Grill	Sumner, Washington	October 9, 2016	505	0.59
New bar owners accuse their manager (and the bar's former owner) of sabotaging their business to try to steal it back. With no clear proof, Jon uses a stress test to determine who's right and who's wrong. Note: This episode is currently not available on Paramount+ or any streaming services. New Name: R. Lee's
126	8	"Gettin' Jigger With It"	Sam Jordan's Bar	San Francisco, California	October 16, 2016	509	0.69
A historical landmark bar, divided in profits and responsibility, pits brother and sister against one another Note: This is the second episode where Jon sends his expert to check on the bar. New Name: N/A (Note: This bar kept its original name.)
127	9	"Chase Lounge"	The Tradewinds	Cotati, California	October 23, 2016	507	0.74
A lazy stepson fails to succeed in his new role as bar manager, and his car dealer father can run the bar. New Name: N/A
128	10	"Zero Drunk Thirty"	Brickhouse Bar & Grill	Colorado Springs, Colorado	October 30, 2016	511	0.64
A military hero on the verge of being redeployed needs his own rescue before he drinks away his profits and angers his girlfriend past the point of no return. New Name: Garrison Tavern
129	11	"Ice, Mice, Baby"	Fort One Bar & Lounge	San Francisco, California	November 6, 2016	510	0.69
A spoiled owner was gifted a nightclub by his father, but the profits aren't coming in for this mice-infested tourist bar. Note: Before revealing the re-branded bar, Jon invites one of its bartenders, Ashley Clark, to assist him on a future rescue, commenting that she is one of the most talented individuals he has ever met. New Name: The Roc Bar & Nightclub
130	12	"Punk as a Drunk"	Triple Nickel Tavern	Colorado Springs, Colorado	November 13, 2016	512	0.64
A former punk rocker is overwhelmed with tragedy, and his constant roughhousing with the employees draws Jon's ire. New Name: N/A
131	13	"Back to the Bar: Drunky McDrunkerton Returns"	N/A	N/A	November 20, 2016	264	0.59
Jon confronts some of the most memorable bar owners in the show's history to find out how they have fared since their rescues. Guests include leopard-print loving sisters Betsy and Stephanie from Handlebar Cafe, plate-throwing Ami from Zanzbar, Gipsy's Janet Jackson-playing bartender Brandon, and The Brixton's combative owner Tim.
132	14	"Don't Tell Mom the Bar is Dead"	St8 Pub	Englewood, Colorado	February 19, 2017	513	0.75
An abrasive owner takes advantage of his mom's generosity to take over a craft beer bar from his landlord. New Name: Downstairs Bar + Kitchen
133	15	"I Know What You Did Last Summit"	Summit House Grill And Tap	Lakewood, Colorado	February 26, 2017	514	0.78
An absentee owner threatens his marriage by drinking away his financial sorrows and flirting with the female patrons. Notes: Jon watched the recon with the owner's wife. Jon also couldn't change the outside or the name due to city ordinances. New Name: N/A
134	16	"Struck Out at the Dugout"	The Dugout	Chicago, Illinois	March 5, 2017	516	0.81
A lackluster landlord falls into the sports bar business when a previous tenant refuses to pay rent on a World Series winning Chicago Cubs hangout. Note: Jon became so disgusted with the owner's bullheaded attitude that he did not hold a grand re-opening for the remodeled bar. No sales figures were available following the rescue. Several bartenders quit immediately after the owner showed up drunk and uninvited to the unveiling, but two of them subsequently returned. In addition, this is the second Bar Rescue episode that did not debut new cocktails, the first being O’Face Bar from Season 3. In 2021, this episode appeared as part of Bar Rescue: The Dirty Truth with small popups adding commentary on various situations throughout the episode. One such popup reveals that during the rescue, the Bar Rescue production crew pitched in to help clean the bar's disgusting kitchen. Several popups contained quotes from Jon about the events with one explaining that "it was two blocks from Wrigley Field about three weeks before the World Series... the whole city knew I was there so I couldn't walk out." They also stated that Ed kept the Press Box concept because he "didn't want to invest in changing the sign again." New Name: Press Box
135	17	"Back to the Bar: Brick & Barley Above Water"	N/A	N/A	March 12, 2017	365	0.72
Jon revisits Brick & Barley to confront owner AJ about her blistering attitude and civil strife with her daughters over the bar's uniforms, then revisits Stein Haus Brau & Brats, where owner Ivan comes clean about the failure of his bar after its rescue.
136	18	"All Twerk and No Pay Makes Taffer Shut It Down"	Speakeasy Bar & Grill	Kenner, Louisiana	March 19, 2017	519	0.79
An owner twerks her way to tears when her bar gets out of step. Note: This is the first episode to feature an expert from a previous rescued bar; Jon recruits bartender Ashley Clark from Roc Nightclub as a mixology expert. New Name: The Second Line Co. Festival Bar & Grill
137	19	"Bar Over Troubled Water"	Big Mike's Sports Bar & Grill	Denham Springs, Louisiana	March 26, 2017	520	0.95
Jon rescues a successful bar, and the beacon of a community, that was destroyed by a recent catastrophic flood in Denham Springs, Louisiana. Similar to the Bungalow from the 2013 episode "Hurricane Jon vs. Hurricane Sandy" (whose now-successful owners donated $10,000 to aid in the rebuilding), the bar was not a failure prior to rescue. New Name: N/A
138	20	"Desi, You Got Some 'Splainin' To Do"	Desi Romano's Sports Bar & Grill	Chalmette, Louisiana	April 2, 2017	518	0.74
After suffering a stroke, a bar owner is on the verge of losing his family legacy. Note: For the recon, Jon brought in the owners from Spirits on Bourbon (formerly Turtle Bay), featured in the third season premiere. Spirits was also used as a training location. New Name: N/A
139	21	"Back to the Bar: Hallelujah for Jon"	N/A	N/A	April 9, 2017	362	0.54
The owners of Crafted, Cayman Cove, and the Kasbah return to praise Jon for turning around their businesses.
140	22	"Casually Tapped Out"	Casual Tap	Chicago, Illinois	July 2, 2017	515	0.59
Jon tries to resurrect a closed neighborhood bar by reigniting the passion of the burnt out firefighter who owns it. New Name: N/A (Note: Despite being closed, the owner plans on re-opening the bar in the near future once he gets done dealing with family issues.)
141	23	"Things That Go Pahrump in the Night"	Paddy's Pub	Pahrump, Nevada	July 16, 2017	521	0.76
It's a race against the clock when Jon Taffer heads to Pahrump, where he must save the failing bar owned by a man who might lose his sight forever. New Name: Pat's Courtyard Bar (Note: Pat's Courtyard Bar originally reverted to its original name before it was changed to Oasis Bar.)
142	24	"Mother Doesn't Know Best"	Jack's Place	Las Vegas, Nevada	July 23, 2017	524	0.61
Jon Taffer tries to convince the ultimate maternal figure to make her decisions like a business owner to save her struggling Las Vegas dive bar from closing its doors. New Name: The Regan Lounge (Note: The Regan Lounge closed after a fire broke out and destroyed most of its property.)
143	25	"Back to the Bar: Flying Fists and Bar Brawls"	N/A	N/A	July 30, 2017	366	0.59
Jon revisits Fogline Bar & Grill and Zanzbar to look back on the show's most outrageous and dangerous fights he has ever witnessed.
144	26	"Silence of the Ants"	Liquid Lounge	Long Beach, California	August 6, 2017	525	0.64
Jon deals with a Long Beach dive bar, unaware that it's being infested by ants. New Name: Tidal Bay Beach Bar
145	27	"Daddy Dearest"	Sidelines Sports Grill & Bar	Mount Dora, Florida	August 13, 2017	532	0.73
Jon calls out the aggressive owner of a family bar for berating the staff and scolding his sons. New Name: Lake House Bar & Grill
146	28	"Rickety Rockin' Rhonda's"	Rockin' Rhonda's	Sanford, Florida	August 20, 2017	534	0.67
Jon races to rescue a failing bar that's about to collapse further into the ground after the insurance company refused the owner's claim to fix its old structure. Note: There was no recon in this episode due to the crumbling floor inside that was caused by Hurricane Matthew's destruction. Because of this, the bar went through a major construction while the stress test and off-site training were done at Waterfront and Imperial respectively. New Name: Rhonda's: A Neighborhood Bar (modernized version of old name)
147	29	"Back to the Bar: For Whom the Cajun Belle Tolls"	N/A	N/A	September 3, 2017	364	0.54
Jon checks in with the Cajun Belle for an update on the owner and his wife's marriage, then revisits Hammer & Ales and the Wildcatter Saloon.
148	30	"The Unlucky Leprechaun"	Lucky Leprechaun	Davenport, Florida	September 10, 2017	531	0.55
The owner's ex-wife threatens to leave him if Jon doesn't help him change his foul mouthing ways. New Name: Lucky's Corner Pocket (modernized version of old name)
149	31	"Back to the Bar: Disasters of Epic Proportions"	N/A	N/A	September 17, 2017	363	0.42
Jon revisits two bars that have suffered disastrous setbacks since being rescued, The Abbey (season 1; damaged by fire) and The End (season 3; lease not renewed), as well as The Shot Exchange (season 3; thriving under new ownership).
