= Bar Rescue season 8 =

Bar Rescue
- Season 8
- Promotional poster for Season 8
- No. of episodes: 37

Release
- Original network: Paramount Network
- Original release: May 2, 2021 – June 11, 2023

Season chronology
- ← Previous; Season 7 Next → Season 9

The eighth season of the American reality series Bar Rescue premiered on May 2, 2021, and ended on June 11, 2023, on Paramount Network. Like other seasons prior, season 8 was also split into multiple parts. Season 8 is also the longest season of Bar Rescue to date, having been on the air for two years.

The majority of the bars during the first half of the season were filmed in Las Vegas, Nevada. The theme of the eighth season was to save an industry in a city affected by the COVID-19 pandemic. The pandemic also meant that filming, recon, training and stress tests, were altered according to local guidelines. The show later returned with episodes of bars throughout the United States, in its traditional format on March 20, 2022.

== Experts ==
- Jon Taffer – Host/Star/Bar Consultant

=== Culinary ===
- Anthony Lamas
- Jason Santos
- Jen Murphy
- Tiffany Derry
- Vic Vegas
- Kevin Bludso
- Michael Ferraro
- Chris Oh
- Ryan Scott

=== Mixology ===
- Nancy Santiago
- Phil Wills
- Rob Floyd
- Mia Mastroianni
- Emily Yett
- Derrick Turner
- Nick Ortega
- Chantel Anderson
- Adam Rains
- Ashley Clark (credited only)
- Austyn Gonzalez

== Episodes ==
No. overall	No. in season	Title	Bar name	Location	Original release date	Prod. code	Viewers (millions)
213	1	"Two Tickets to Paradise Cantina"	Paradise Cantina	Las Vegas, Nevada	May 2, 2021	802	0.56
In his hometown of Las Vegas, Jon rescues a beloved party bar that blames its downfall on the pandemic, until Jon discovers the truth.
214	2	"Not Your Godfather's Speakeasy"	Capo's Italian Cuisine	Las Vegas, Nevada	May 9, 2021	801	0.60
Jon attempts to save the legendary Las Vegas Speakeasy Capo's Restaurant and bring it back to its pre-pandemic glory. Note: This restaurant was previously featured on Food Network's Mystery Diners, hosted by Charles Stiles in 2013.
215	3	"A Twice in a Lifetime Opportunity"	Champagne's Cafe	Las Vegas, Nevada	May 23, 2021	804	0.51
In his second re-rescue, Jon Taffer returns to Champagne's Cafe to help the struggling bar survive the pandemic and maintain its Las Vegas legacy. Note: This is Jon's second attempt at a re-rescue. Champagne's Cafe was originally featured in the season 5 episode "The Perks of Being a Wallpaper."
216	4	"Every Rose Has Its Thorn"	Cork and Thorn	Las Vegas, Nevada	June 6, 2021	803	0.44
After running a successful floral business for two decades, owner Randi thought she could parlay that success into a budding new bar, but she never rose to the occasion. Note: For recon, Jon brought in Rick and Corey Harrison.
217	5	"Viva La Casona"	La Casona Bar and Grill	Las Vegas, Nevada	June 13, 2021	806	0.55
For his 200th rescue, Jon rescues a family who bought a Mexican restaurant at the height of the pandemic and put their daughter's future on the line to chase the bright lights of Vegas. Note: Although billed as the 200th episode, this episode was 214th in airing order and instead Jon's 200th rescue. In addition, he brought in Clelin Ferrell and Trayvon Mullen to do recon. This was also the most recent appearance of Tiffany Derry as the chef expert.
218	6	"Rookie of the Beer"	Nevada Brew Works	Las Vegas, Nevada	June 20, 2021	805	0.46
Jon Taffer must save an ambitious but rookie family-run brewery that was forced to open during the pandemic.
219	7	"A Bar to Take Pride In"	Badlands	Las Vegas, Nevada	June 27, 2021	807	0.41
A gay bar in Las Vegas is on the verge of closing after losing all of its entertainment options due to the COVID-19 pandemic.
220	8	"A Commander & His Post"	VFW Post 10054	Pahrump, Nevada	July 11, 2021	808	0.58
Jon heads to Pahrump, Nevada to save a VFW hail from permanently closing its doors and to help its commanding officer step away to take care of his ailing wife.
221	9	"Behind the 8 Ball"	Griff's	Las Vegas, Nevada	July 18, 2021	809	0.48
A premiere billiards hall in Las Vegas is at risk of closing after its owner struggles to recover from the effects of the pandemic and an inept manager.
222	10	"Ninja Karaoke's Swan Song"	Ninja Karaoke	Las Vegas, Nevada	August 1, 2021	810	0.46
Jon Taffer tries to help a struggling married couple save their karaoke bar in downtown Las Vegas and get back on track with their goals to start a family.
223	11	"Remembering Billy"	The County Line Lounge & Grille	Tucson, Arizona	August 8, 2021	811	0.56
Personal tragedies and the global pandemic are just two of the problems at a Tucson bar. New Name: The Billy Bar
224	12	"Wreck It Ralph"	True Grit Tavern	Maricopa, Arizona	August 15, 2021	812	0.53
Jon attempts to rescue a bar in Maricopa, Arizona, whose owner has squandered a half a million-dollar investment from his parents. New Name: The Roost
225	13	"Penalty on the Bar"	Gilly's Sports Bar	Dunwoody, Georgia	March 20, 2022	817	0.56
In Dunwoody, Georgia, Jon Taffer tries to help a former hospitality professional regain his passion for the industry and save his flailing bar. New Name: Stadium Club Bar & Grill
226	14	"Ace's Wild"	Ace's Sports Hangar	The Colony, Texas	March 27, 2022	813	0.49
Jon heads to Texas to help a husband and wife rescue their failing bar and learn how to be better partners in business. Note: Nick Solak and his fiancé Roxanne acted as recon spies. New Name: Ace's A Sporting Bar & Grill (modernized version of old name) (Note: This bar has been sold.) (Note: This bar has been closed.)
227	15	"Personal Assistant, Professional Failure"	The Brick Tavern	Sachse, Texas	April 3, 2022	814	0.54
In the heart of Texas, Jon must help an owner figure out how to be a better boss and help her personal assistant step up to lead the bar. New Name: Char Bar & BBQ
228	16	"Doing it for Dad"	G Willicker's	Arlington, Texas	April 10, 2022	815	0.57
After losing their father and stepmom, three sisters find themselves unexpectedly owning a bar that they never learned how to run. New Name: The GW (modernized version of old name)
229	17	"Shutting Down the Confetti Party"	Confetti's Bar & Grill	Norcross, Georgia	April 17, 2022	816	0.34
Jon helps an owner who battled childhood illness and the loss of his father learn how to run a bar and manage a business. New Name: Tropica Bar & Cafe
230	18	"Sandtown Rescue"	SandTown Pub	Atlanta, Georgia	April 24, 2022	818	0.41
In the heart of Atlanta, Jon helps an owner seize her second chance in life by saving her struggling bar and managing her staff. New Name: JJ's Famous Chicken Bar (Note: This bar reverted to its original name following the rescue.)
231	19	"Working to Death"	JF Kicks	Valrico, Florida	May 8, 2022	819	0.40
Jon heads to Tampa, Florida to help save an owner who has suffered personal loss and health scares while trying to single-handedly keep his struggling bar afloat. Note: For recon, Jon brought in Adam Cole and Britt Baker. New Name: Jimmy's
232	20	"Magically Atrocious"	Cerealholic Cafe & Bar	Ybor City, Florida	May 15, 2022	820	0.45
In Ybor City, Florida, Jon helps rescue a bar owner who made some questionable choices on the theme, decor, and menu in her bar. New Name: The Loft Elevated Bar + Food
233	21	"Rescue on the River"	AJ’s on the River	Gibsonton, Florida	May 22, 2022	821	0.49
A riverside bar in Florida is struggling to stay afloat due to a manager with no experience, a staff co-mingling and a wildly out-of-line menu for their community. New Name: Jerry’s Dockside Bar and Grill
234	22	"Till Failure Do You Part"	The Forge	Brandon, Florida	May 29, 2022	822	0.40
In Gibsonton, Florida, Jon must help rescue not only a failing bar but a broken marriage after the COVID-19 pandemic destroyed both their business and their relationship. New Name: Crowne Irish Pub
235	23	"Game Over"	Throwbacks	Sanford, Florida	June 12, 2022	823	0.38
Jon heads to Sandford, Florida to revitalize a retro-arcade bar that is falling apart and an owner who has an excuse for everything. New Name: Murphy's Arcade Bar & Pizza
236	24	"JJ's Sports Bust"	JJ's Sports Bar & Grill	Highland, California	February 26, 2023	825	0.41
A family-owned bar is struggling due to the owner's on-the-job behavior. Note: For recon, Jon brought in Maria Menounos, Keven Undergaro, Trinity Fatu and Mercedes Varnado. He also performed the recon with the owner's wife. New Name: JJ's Sports Cafe (modernized version of old name)
237	25	"Outta Touch, Outta Time"	Rockabillies	Arvada, Colorado	March 5, 2023	831	0.36
Jon encounters an unruly husband of an owner who is on the brink of closing her bar in Arvada, Colorado. Note: This restaurant was previously featured on Food Network's Mystery Diners, hosted by Charles Stiles in 2014. New Name: Bar Retro
238	26	"Hideaway From Reality"	Hideaway Bar & Grill	Meridian, Idaho	March 12, 2023	837	0.35
Jon visits an Idaho bar plagued by multiple problems, including employees who privately accuse the owner of hurting the business with his drinking but will not repeat their claims to his face. Note: After confronting the employees with footage of their accusations, Jon and his crew left without rescuing the bar, furious about the employees calling him a liar when he had only been repeating what they themselves had said, the owner's refusal to admit to his drinking and refusing to have his reputation attached to the bar of the town drunk as the owner was referred to by people. Jon states that, out of 240 episodes of Bar Rescue, this is only his third walkout and that walking out is no small matter. In addition, footage is shown of the crew taking down all of their equipment and packing up. This was also the third rescue to not debut new cocktails; the first being O'Face Bar and the second being The Dugout. There was also not a stress test. This is one of the first episodes of the show that the mixologist wasn't introduced; per the credits, Ashley Clark was originally supposed to be the mixologist for this episode. Due to the nature of this episode, she wasn't seen or heard from in any capacity. (Note: This bar was not rescued.)
239	27	"The Napoleon Complex"	360 Lounge Reloaded	Charlotte, North Carolina	March 19, 2023	827	0.39
Jon must teach a former engineer and his staff how to properly run a nightclub before they close down for good. Note: After noticing the owner taking his recon people's private information, Jon takes part in the recon himself in order to understand the owner's actions. New Name: Rio Ultra Lounge
240	28	"Pool House Rock"	Colorado Cork & Keg	Castle Rock, Colorado	March 26, 2023	829	0.37
Jon confronts an owner who moved his family to pursue his lifelong dream of opening a bar, only for his wife to do all the work. New Name: Valerie's Brewhouse
241	29	"Loveless in Loveland"	Blue Sports Grille	Loveland, Colorado	April 2, 2023	833	0.35
Jon attempts to rescue a bar owner in Loveland, Colorado, who is on the verge of losing his business and his marriage. Note: Courtland Sutton joins Jon to help him evaluate the bar. For recon, Jon brings in Justin Simmons, Kareem Jackson, and Bradley Chubb, three members of the team who the bar owner and the staff don't even recognize despite owning and running a sports bar with the Denver Broncos as their home team. As a special surprise, Jon brings former Broncos' running back Terrell Davis to the relaunch. New Name: Colorado Champions Sports Cafe
242	30	"Fresh Bread, Rotten Bar"	CJ's Patio Grill	Loveland, Colorado	April 9, 2023	832	0.39
Jon helps a struggling owner take a step back so that his apprehensive manager can take a step forward. Note: For recon, Jon brought in local television and radio personalities Kylie Bearse and Chelsea Thomas.
243	31	"3rd Pocket's a Charm"	Corner Pocket II	Hickory, North Carolina	April 23, 2023	828	0.33
In Hickory, North Carolina, Jon finds a bar with an absent owner, an untrained staff, and an infestation of pests. Note: For this bar, Jon did not do recon, instead immediately confronting the staff along with Vic Vegas about the disgusting state of the bar after watching the camera footage. New Name: The Gateway Pub & Grill
244	32	"Long Live a Legacy"	Papa Joe's Sports Bar	Moreno Valley, California	April 30, 2023	824	0.42
Jon heads to Moreno Valley, California, to save the legacy of a pizza and sports bar after the passing of one of the owners leaves a family in disarry. New Name: Layla's Pizza Pub
245	33	"Horseshoe Bend It Like Bar Rescue"	Corner Cafe Bar & Grill	Horseshoe Bend, Idaho	May 14, 2023	835	0.40
Jon must save a small country bar in rural Idaho from going under while teaching the General Manager how to be a true leader. Note: After seeing the state of the bar, Jon performs the recon himself along with his expert. He also literally throws the white flag during the stress test, something that Jon notes has only happened two or three times on Bar Rescue. New Name: Country Barn Corner Cafe
246	34	"Spare Me Another Chance"	Strikers	Meridian, Idaho	May 21, 2023	836	0.29
Jon must help a businessman who bought a bar attached to a bowling alley but had never stepped foot in a bar. New Name: Bullseye Sports Bar and Kitchen
247	35	"Changing of the Guards"	VFW Post 9644	Sheridan, Colorado	May 28, 2023	830	0.44
Jon rescues a VFW on its last legs before the bar's 75th anniversary.
248	36	"Put This Fire Out"	Firehouse Sports Pub	Nampa, Idaho	June 4, 2023	834	0.38
Jon tries to save a firehouse-themed bar outside of Boise, Idaho and confronts an owner with excuses for everything. New Name: Dave's Firehouse (modernized version of old name)
249	37	"How The Cookie Crumbles"	Latitudes Bar and Grill	Denver, North Carolina	June 11, 2023	826	0.40
Jon must save a business owned by a former travel agent and her family before it crashes and burns. New Name: Latitudes Island Bar and Grille
