= LCPC =

LCPC may refer to:

- Licensed Clinical Professional Counselor, a licensure for mental health professionals
- Laboratoire central des ponts et chaussées, a French scientific and technical research public establishment
- Languages and Compilers for Parallel Computing, a computer science conference
