= Melissa Cookston =

American chef and author

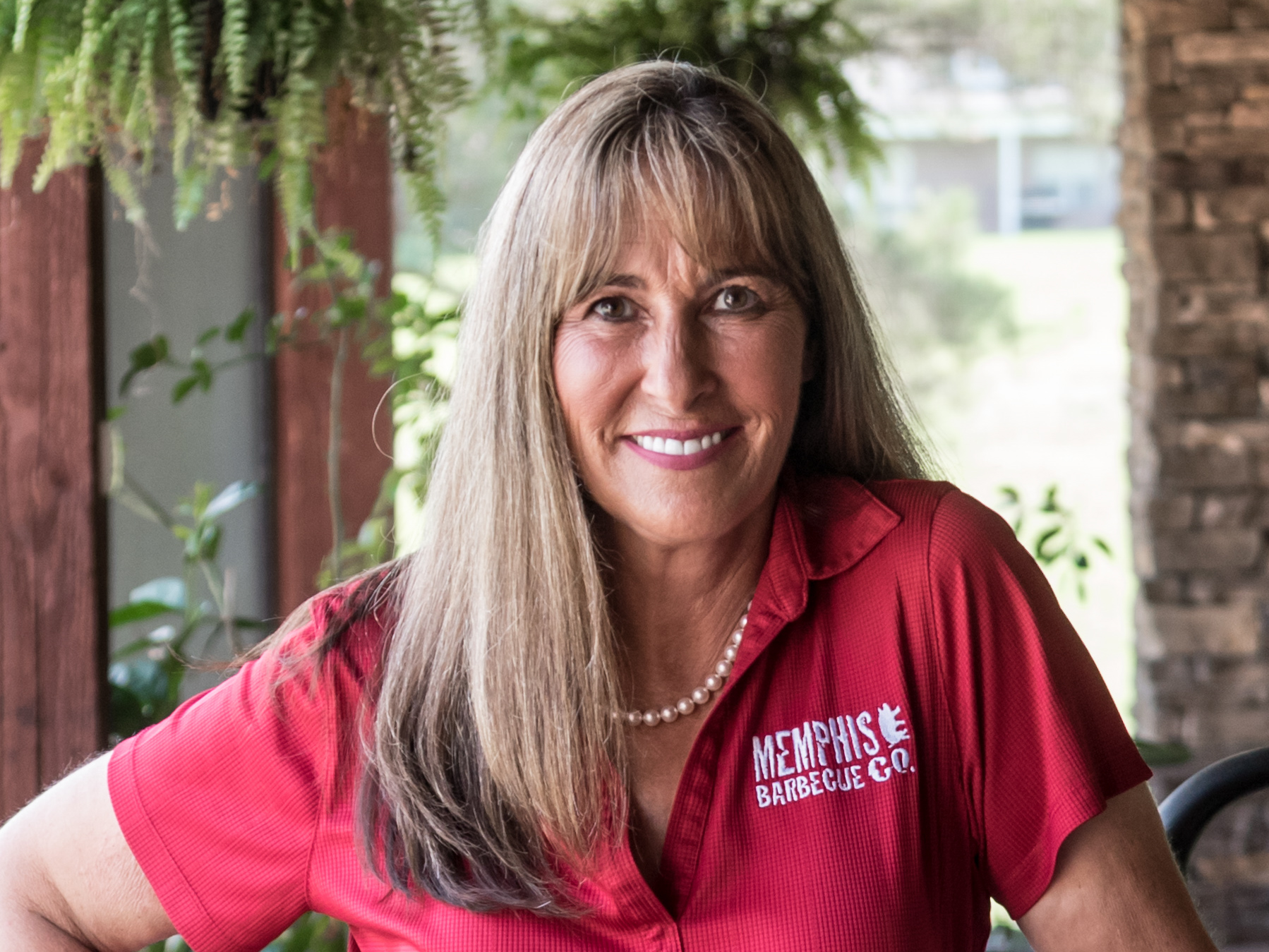

Melissa Cookston is an American chef and author. She is the chef/owner of two restaurants, the author of two cookbooks, and a seven-time world American barbecue champion. In addition, Cookston has twice won top prize at the Memphis in May American Barbecue World Championship and is the only female American barbecue world champion.

== Early life ==
Cookston was born in Ruleville, Mississippi in 1968. She grew up in Greenville, Mississippi and Pontotoc, Mississippi.

== Career ==
Melissa worked in food preparation for years. In 1996, she started cooking barbecue and began entering in competitions, winning many. In 2007, she and her husband quit their jobs and toured barbecue contests around the country. In 2011, they were able to open their first restaurant, Memphis BBQ Company, which has locations in Mississippi and Georgia. In October 2016, she opened her second restaurant, STEAK by Melissa, in Southaven, Mississippi. It closed in 2020. She also opened a catering/plate lunch restaurant in 2019 called Green Tomato Catering in Horn Lake, MS. She still serves as pitmaster of Yazoo's Delta Q barbecue team. In 2017, Cookston revealed that she had begun breeding her own hybrid pigs.

Since 2012, she has appeared on TV shows such as BBQ Pitmasters, Chopped, CBS This Morning, and The Kitchen, The American Barbecue Showdown, among others.

== Personal life ==
She currently lives in Hernando, Mississippi with her husband, Pete, and her daughter, Lauren.

== Bibliography ==
- Smokin in the Boy’s Room (2014)
- Smokin’ Hot in the South (2016)
