= Tonic Lounge =

Defunct bar and music venue in Portland, Oregon, U.S.

- Logo

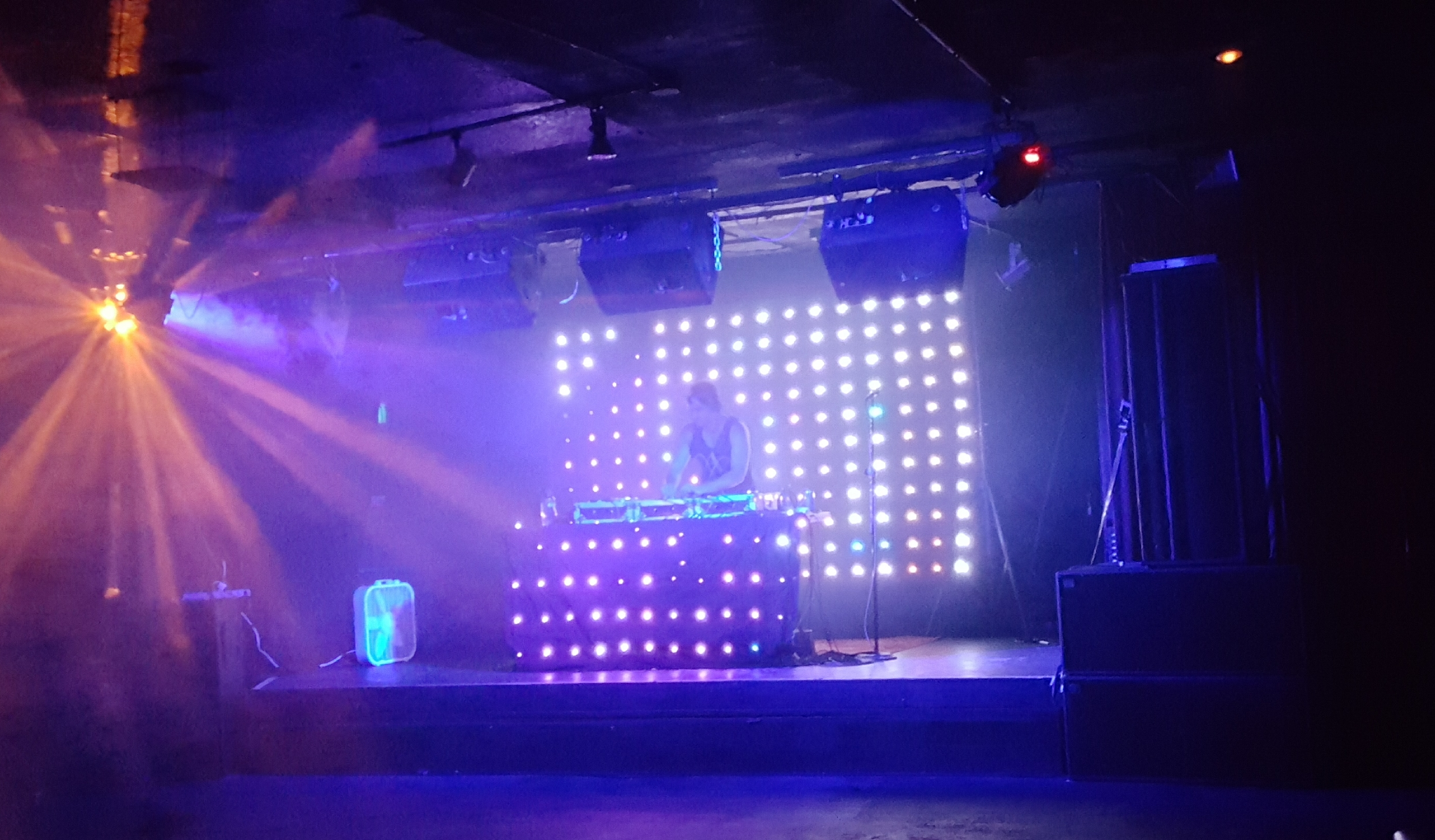
- Interior view of stage setup for the event Circuit Breaker, 2019
- Interactive map of Tonic Lounge
- Former names: Panic Room Caution: High Volume Bar; The Raven
- Address: 3100 Northeast Sandy Blvd.
- Location: Portland, Oregon, U.S.
- Coordinates: 45°31′50.5″N 122°37′57.2″W

Construction
- Closed: August 31, 2019

Website
- tonicloungeportland.com

Tonic Lounge was a bar and music venue located at 3100 Northeast Sandy Blvd., in Portland, Oregon's Kerns neighborhood.

== History ==
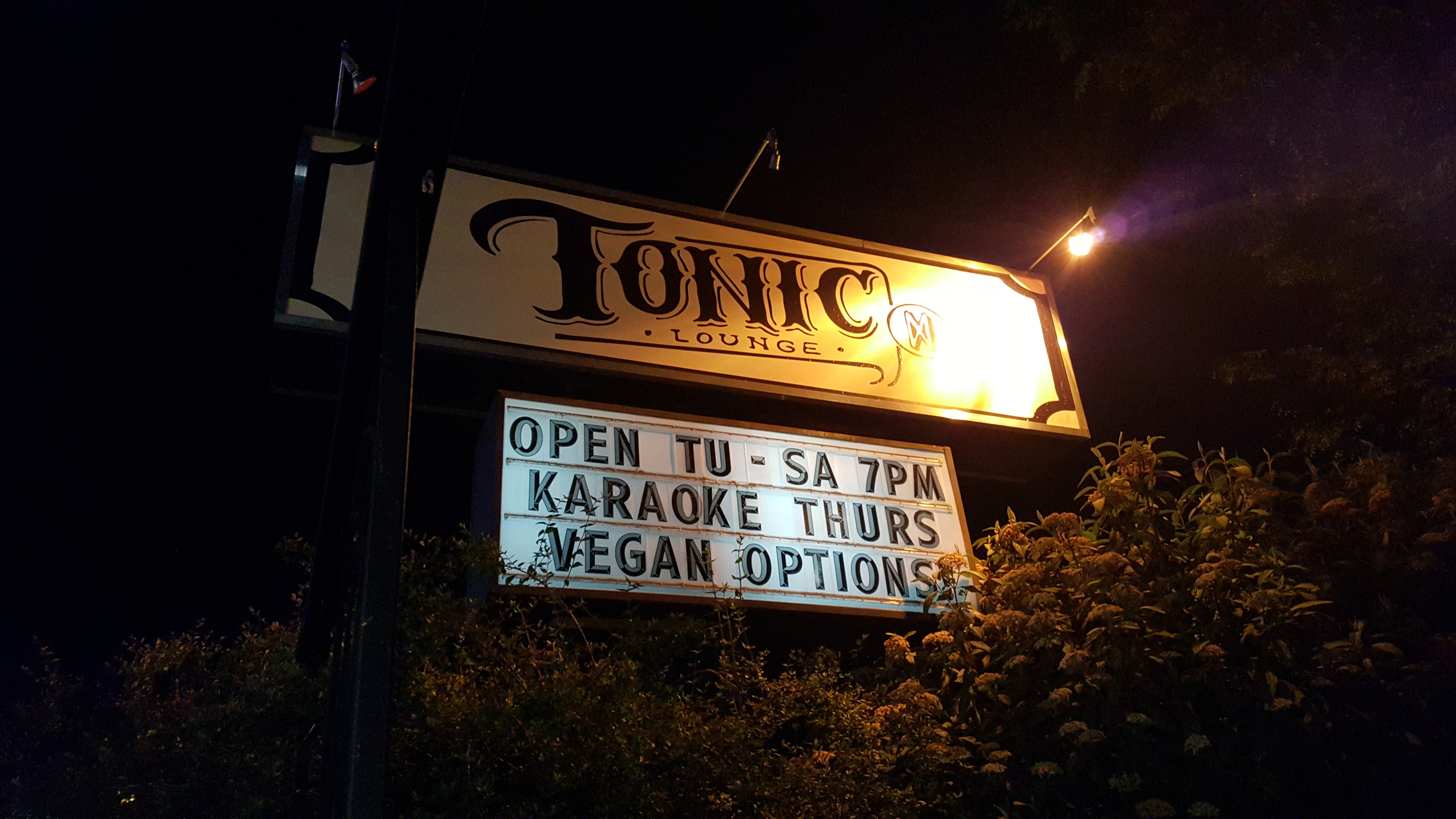
Signage

The venue was briefly known as Panic Room Caution: High Volume Bar and The Raven, before returning to the name Tonic Lounge in March 2017. In May 2017, the venue cancelled a scheduled performance by the Swedish band Shining because of reports about Niklas Kvarforth's behavior. Tonic Lounge closed on August 31, 2019.

== See also ==
- Bar Rescue (season 4)
- Culture of Portland, Oregon
- List of Bar Rescue episodes
