= Jason Santos =

American restaurateur and cookbook author (born 1976)

- Born: March 1, 1976 (age 50); Melrose, Massachusetts
- Education: Newbury College
- Spouse: Thuy Le
- Culinary career
- Cooking style: American
- Current restaurants: Citrus & Salt; Buttermilk & Bourbon
- Previous restaurants: Blue Inc; Nash Bar & Stage
- Television show(s): Hell's Kitchen (contestant, season 7; sous-chef, seasons 19-22) Bar Rescue (culinary expert)

Jason "Jay" Santos (born March 1, 1976) is a Boston-based restaurateur, cookbook and author. He was runner-up on Hell's Kitchen season 7 and has appeared on Bar Rescue seasons 5, 6, 7, 8 and 9 as a kitchen expert. He returned for season 19 of Hell's Kitchen as Gordon Ramsay's sous-chef when the season debuted in January 2021, and stayed for seasons 20, 21 and 22. He went by Jay in his earlier appearances on Hell's Kitchen but goes by Jason now.

Santos and his Buttermilk & Bourbon restaurants are known for their New Orleans-inspired food.

== Career ==
Early in his career, he worked for Andy Husbands at Tremont 647 for six years, before becoming executive chef at Gargoyles on the Square in 2005. His "innovative cuisine transformed the restaurant from neighborhood stalwart to out-of-town dining destination." His food has been described as "Julia Child meets Willy Wonka".

His restaurant Blue Inc. closed in September 2014.

Santos has been executive chef and owner of three Boston restaurants: Abby Lane (in the Boston Theater District), Citrus & Salt (Back Bay, Boston) and Buttermilk & Bourbon. He also owned B&B Fish, which opened during November 2020 in Marblehead, Massachusetts (now closed).

In 2021, Santos and his partners announced they would open a location in July at Arsenal Yards in Watertown, Massachusetts. The Buttermilk & Bourbon location actually opened on August 5, 2021.

Santos has also taught culinary courses at both Boston University and Cambridge Rindge and Latin School.

=== Cookbooks ===
Buttermilk & Bourbon: New Orleans Recipes with a Modern Flair was published in March 2019. Simple Fancy: A Chef's Big-Flavor Recipes for Easy Weeknight Cooking, a cookbook for home cooks, was published in December 2022.

== Personal life ==
Santos and his wife Thuy (née Le) are parents of a daughter, born in August 2022.

When he appeared on season 7 of Hell's Kitchen, he lived in Medford, Massachusetts. There he worked as an executive chef at Gargoyles on the Square in Somerville, Massachusetts. He returned to Gargoyles at the end of the season.

Santos graduated from Newbury College. In 2021, it was reported Santos and his wife lived in Woburn, Massachusetts.

A notable part of his physical appearance is his blue-dyed hair, which he has dyed for up to 20 years, leading to the nicknames 'Blue Jay' and 'Smurf'.
