= Barbecue Showdown =

American reality television series

- Genre: Reality show
- Country of origin: United States
- Original language: English
- No. of seasons: 3
- No. of episodes: 24

Production
- Executive producers: Daniel Calin; John stuffling Simon Knight; Tim Pastore
- Running time: 41–44 minutes
- Production companies: Maverick Television; All3Media America

Original release
- Network: Netflix
- Release: September 18, 2020 – July 4, 2024

Barbecue Showdown (originally titled The American Barbecue Showdown) is a reality television series filmed in Covington, Georgia, that premiered on Netflix on September 18, 2020. On August 9, 2021, Netflix renewed the series for a second season. For season 3, the series moved its filming location to Gay, Georgia.

== Concept ==
Contestants from across the United States compete in a barbecue cook-off to be crowned the "American Barbecue Champion". At the start of each season there are 8 contestants, each of them with different levels of barbecuing experience. They have to face challenges cooking in different styles, sometimes with extra surprise challenges. There is a focus not just on the cooking aspect but maintaining the barbecue's temperature and smoking abilities. Each cooking task must be completed within a set time, often less than the time typically needed to prepare and cook the specified meal.

== Cast ==
- Kevin Bludso, Judge
- Melissa Cookston, Judge
- Rutledge Wood, Host (season 1)
- Lyric Lewis, Host (season 1)
- Michelle Buteau, Host (seasons 2 and 3)

== Episodes ==
Season	Episodes	Originally released
1	8	September 18, 2020
2	8	May 26, 2023
3	8	July 4, 2024

=== Season 1 (2020) ===
No. overall	No. in season	Title	Original release date
1	1	"Barbecue in the Blood"	September 18, 2020
2	2	"Red, White and Barbecue"	September 18, 2020
3	3	"Don't Need Teeth to Eat this Beef"	September 18, 2020
4	4	"Tournament of Sandwiches"	September 18, 2020
5	5	"Raccoon, Iguana and Hare - Oh My!"	September 18, 2020
6	6	"Cooking it Old School"	September 18, 2020
7	7	"Barbecue Around the World"	September 18, 2020
8	8	"The. Whole. Hog."	September 18, 2020

=== Season 2 (2023) ===
No. overall	No. in season	Title	Original release date
9	1	"The Fire Within"	May 26, 2023
10	2	"Saucy and Spicy"	May 26, 2023
11	3	"Land, Sea & Fire"	May 26, 2023
12	4	"Breakfast Showdown"	May 26, 2023
13	5	"BBQ Trash or Treasure?"	May 26, 2023
14	6	"A Festive Feast"	May 26, 2023
15	7	"Don't Bring a Skewer, To A Swordfight"	May 26, 2023
16	8	"The Piggy Bank"	May 26, 2023

=== Season 3 (2024) ===
No. overall	No. in season	Title	Original release date
17	1	"Bad to the Bone"	July 4, 2024
18	2	"Brew and 'Cue"	July 4, 2024
19	3	"The Trench Is Back"	July 4, 2024
20	4	"Friday Night Bites"	July 4, 2024
21	5	"Slow Fast Food"	July 4, 2024
22	6	"Brisket Battle"	July 4, 2024
23	7	"Go Pig or Go Home"	July 4, 2024
24	8	"The Final Stand"	July 4, 2024

== Contestant progress ==
=== Season 1 (2020) ===
Contestant	1	2	3	4	5	6	7	8
Tina	SAFE	WIN	WIN	HIGH	HIGH	WIN	SAFE	Winner
Rasheed	WIN	HIGH	HIGH	SAFE	HIGH	WIN	WIN	Runner-up
Sylvie	SAFE	SAFE	BTM2	WIN	WIN	BTM2	ELIM	
Ashley	HIGH	SAFE	SAFE	SAFE	BTM2	ELIM		
Grubbs	BTM2	SAFE	BTM2	BTM2	ELIM			
Georgia	SAFE	BTM2	SAFE	ELIM				
Boatright	SAFE	ELIM						
Shotgun	ELIM							

=== Season 2 (2023) ===
Contestant	1	2	3	4	5	6	7	8
Thyron	SAFE	WIN	SAFE	BTM2	WIN	WIN	WIN	Winner
Logan	HIGH	HIGH	BTM2	WIN	HIGH	WIN	SAFE	Runner-up
Delilah	SAFE	SAFE	HIGH	HIGH	BTM2	BTM2	ELIM	
Michelle	SAFE	SAFE	WIN	SAFE	BTM2	ELIM		
Eduardo	WIN	BTM2	SAFE	ELIM				
Joey	SAFE	SAFE	ELIM					
Cindy	BTM2	ELIM						
John Boy	ELIM							

=== Season 3 (2024) ===
Contestant	1	2	3	4	5	6	7	8
Shaticka	HIGH	SAFE	WIN	BTM2	HIGH	BTM2	SAFE	Winner
Gerald	SAFE	HIGH	SAFE	HIGH	BTM2	SAFE	WIN	Runner-up
Sloan	SAFE	WIN	HIGH	SAFE	WIN	WIN	ELIM	
Kareem	WIN	SAFE	SAFE	SAFE	SAFE	ELIM		
Staci	SAFE	SAFE	SAFE	WIN	ELIM			
Melissa	SAFE	BTM2	BTM2	ELIM				
Kent	BTM2	SAFE	ELIM					
Luis	SAFE	ELIM						
Tung	ELIM							
