= Inn of the Seventh Ray =

Restaurant in Topanga, California

Coordinates: 34.0902°N 118.6047°W

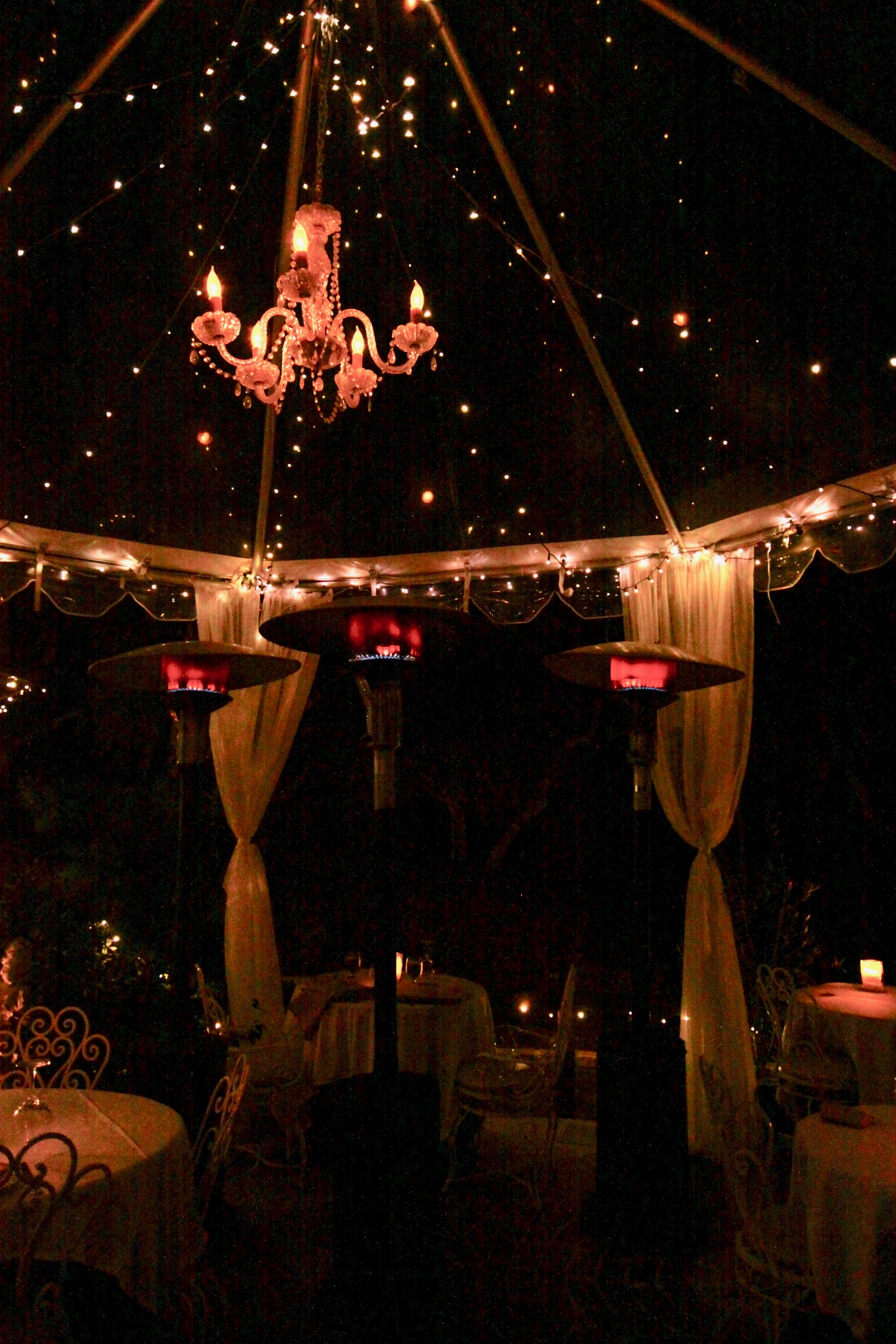
- Industry: Organic gourmet food restaurant
- Founded: 1975
- Founder: Ralph and Lucile Yaney
- Headquarters: 128 Old Topanga Canyon Rd., Topanga, California, U.S.
- Owner: Ralph and Lucile Yaney, Brad Miller

Inn of the Seventh Ray is a restaurant located at 128 Old Topanga Canyon Rd. in Topanga, California. It was founded in 1975.

== History ==
The site now occupied by the restaurant is reported to have been a meeting place for the local Chumash people. Aimee Semple McPherson is said to have used the site as a retreat in the 1930s.

Over time, the location is said to have been used for a church, a garage, a gas station, and a junkyard.

Ralph and Lucile Yaney founded the restaurant in 1975 with the mission of serving mostly organic food. The restaurant as it stands currently is still owned by the Yaneys and co-owned by head chef Brad Miller.

== Menu ==
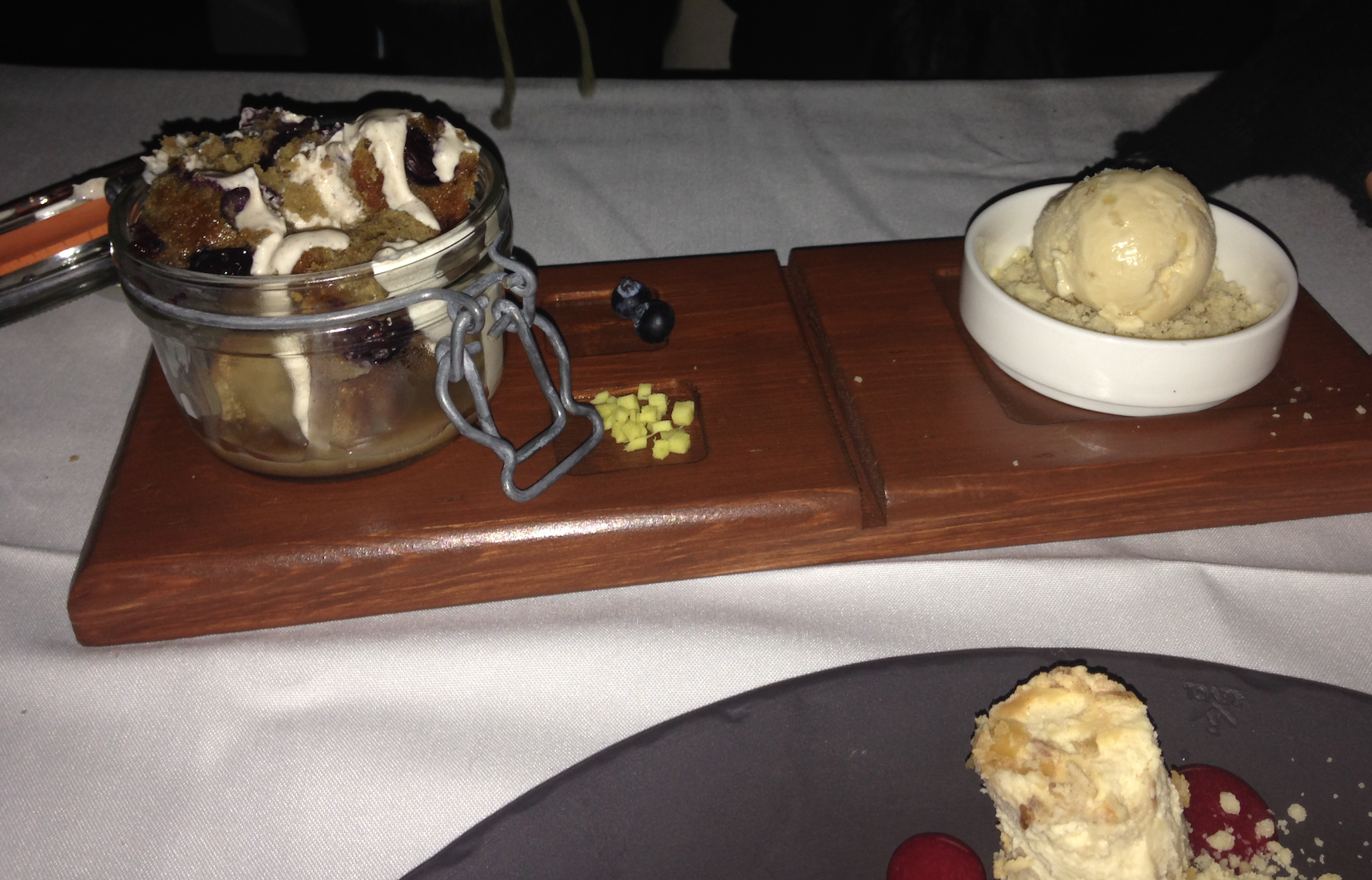
Banana bread pudding dessert with vanilla bean ice cream.

Menu items include yellowfin tuna crudo, seared Hokkaido scallops, beef tartare, oven-roasted Chilean sea bass, grilled Spanish octopus, and grilled portobello mushrooms with apricot sauce, pesto, and truffle oil.
