= Hungry Investors =

2014 American reality television series

- Genre: Reality television
- Starring: John Besh; Tiffany Derry; Jon Taffer
- Country of origin: United States
- Original language: English

Original release
- Network: Spike
- Release: May 4 – September 14, 2014

Hungry Investors was a 2014 American reality television series.

== Overview ==
Jon Taffer was joined by chefs John Besh and Tiffany Derry on a cross country search for struggling restaurants with incredible potential for success. The show was cancelled after one season.
