= Brad Miller (chef) =

American professional chef (born 1981)

Brad Miller (born 1981) is an American professional chef and TV personality. He is the host of the Cooking Channel’s Food Truck Nation. He was a contestant on season 3 of the Fox Network reality TV show Hell's Kitchen, finishing 6th.

Miller was born and raised in Ottawa, Illinois. He graduated from Le Cordon Bleu Culinary Institute of Scottsdale in Arizona. He is the chef and partner at Inn of the Seventh Ray in Topanga, California, and executive chef of Five Star Senior Living, an organization that operates residential senior communities.
