= Licensed clinical professional counselor =

A licensed clinical professional counselor (LCPC) is a professional who has been qualified to provide psychotherapy and other counselling services. LCPCs are trained to work with individuals, families, and groups to treat mental, behavioural and emotional problems and disorders. The main goal of LCPCs is to use counselling strategies to help people live a more satisfying life, which typically involves identifying a goal and finding potential solutions.

Different from psychologists, who have received a doctoral-level education in diagnosing, assessing, and treating psychiatric disorders, LCPCs provide counseling services to help clients manage a specific problem that has been diagnosed. LCPCs can have a range of different backgrounds. They must obtain a minimum of a master's degree in fields that are relevant to counselling, such as Psychology and Nursing. A certain amount of training under the supervision of a professional counselor is also required. The detailed requirements for licence may vary from province to province in Canada.

In Canada, the only provinces with statutory regulation are Québec, Ontario, and Nova Scotia. In these three provinces, there are written laws set by a legislature to regulate the behaviors of counselors. Some provinces like Alberta and British Columbia have an umbrella health professions governance statute that could be used as a framework for having counselling regulated. There are two major national associations, Canadian Counselling and Psychotherapy Association (CCPA) and Canadian Professional Counsellors Association (CPCA), They provide certification and accreditation that act as a base of provincial regulation. The certification of counselors is available through the Canadian Counselling and Psychotherapy Association (CCPA).

== Titles ==
There are many different designations for counselors that offer various services. A counsellor or psychotherapist certified by the Canadian Counselling and Psychotherapy Association (CCPA) is a "Canadian Certified Counsellor", sometimes abbreviated to CCC. Members of the Canadian Professional Counsellors Association (CPCA) are "Registered Professional Counsellors" (or RPCs).

== Associations ==
The Canadian Counselling and Psychotherapy Association (CCPA) is a national association providing two main activities. They offer the service of accreditation to institutions that offer counselling and psychotherapy programs. They also offer certification to professional counsellors and/or psychotherapists who have the appropriate training and experience.

The Canadian Professional Counsellors Association (CPCA) is a national association and offers memberships to counsellors.

In Canada, a few provinces (Quebec, Ontario, and Nova Scotia) have regulated by law the practice of counselling and psychotherapy, and professionals wishing to practise in these provinces need to be certified or licensed by the regulating body in the province.

== Certification or Membership ==
Professionals interested in certification offered by the Canadian Counselling and Psychotherapy Association need to become a member of the association by becoming members. Applicants need to have a graduate-level degree in counselling based on an accredited program in counselling or related field. There are different criteria for people who have graduated in different countries. Canadians need to graduate from a Canadian institution that is a member of the Association of Universities and Colleges of Canada (AUCC). These applicants need to demonstrate that they have completed a minimum of eight graduate-level courses in specific areas of study relevant to counselling and psychotherapy, including four elective courses that meet the CCPA's coursework guidelines.

Professionals who want to become members of the Canadian Professional Counsellors Association (CPCA) need to meet a number of competencies. These competencies comply with the Federal Statutes specifically the Agreement on Internal Trade. Professionals need to meet a number of requirements in order to be eligible for registration, these include: education, training, professional supervision, completion of CPCA exams and questionnaires, and professional experience as a counsellor. This organisation has a flexible approach to approving the memberships of applicants in terms of considering the competencies gained during training.

== Education and Practice ==
The certification requirements for the CCPA include eight compulsory graduate-level courses and four elective courses. The eight compulsory courses are:

- Counselling Theories – Designed to give a counselling student a suitable framework to work with clients in a therapeutic environment. This course needs to contain a number of elements including both academic and practical theories (psychodynamic, humanistic).
- Supervised Counselling Practicum – While working in a therapeutic environment, directly with clients, the applicant must complete at least 20 hours of professional supervision.
- Counselling and Communication Skills – Covers the skills necessary for creating an effective therapeutic relationship through emphasising interviewing and counselling techniques. Self-reflection is an important element of this course.
- Professional Ethics - Examining ethical and legal issues relating specifically to counselling.

The four elective courses can be chosen from a list of twelve possible options.

To gain certification, applicants must demonstrate their experience by proving that they have engaged in direct counselling practice hours. An applicant that has graduated within the last five years must have completed at least 150 hours, whereas an applicant who graduated more than five years ago needs to demonstrate at least three years full-time counselling practice within the last ten years.

There are four programs (offered in three Canadian universities: University of British Columbia, Acadia University, and Trinity Western University) that are accredited by the Council on Accreditation of Counsellor Education Programs (CACEP), a body set up by the CCPA to accredit educational programs.

The Canadian Professional Counsellors Association requires an applicant to complete a qualifying examination. This examination is designed to establish an applicant's understanding of fundamental aspects of counselling theory and practice, these include:

- Clinical Assessment, Crisis Intervention, Suicide Assessment and Prevention
- The Counselling Process and Therapeutic Interventions
- Loss and Grief Counselling
- Communication and Conflict Resolution Skills
- Working Knowledge of The Diagnostic and Statistical Manual of Mental Disorders(DSM-IV / V) & Mental Status Exam
- Professional Ethical Standards and Proof of Legal Liability Insurance
- Fee Assessment, Professional Accountability, and Referral
- Initial Client Contact, Maintaining and Determining the Length of Counselling, Evaluation of Progress, and Closure
- Awareness of one's own significant conflicts and losses

== Supervision ==
The CCPA specifies the characteristics of the supervision requirement mentioned above, for example, the applicant must meet with a qualified supervisor on a regular basis.

Personal counselling time cannot be considered as professional supervision, its main purpose is to facilitate the development of the applicant's counselling skills and oversee the competency of their work. A supervisor must have the appropriate qualifications in order to be considered in the application process. These qualifications include having at least four years of counselling practice after completing an appropriate post graduate degree and being a member of the CCPA (or equivalent association).

The CPCA states that an applicant for an intern membership must work under the supervision of a counsellor or psychotherapist who has at least eight years experience and is registered member of a professional counselling association. A student membership requires the approved supervision while completing counselling sessions.

== General career information ==
LCPCs practise therapeutic techniques to guide, support and rehabilitate individuals and groups. LCPCs work within a range of specialties including marriage and family, educational, vocational and mental health counselling. They can find employment in educational institutions, community health centres, private practices, and hospitals.

== Mental Health Counsellor ==
LCPC who work in mental health can get employed in community health organizations, private practice and hospitals. LCPCs employed as mental health counsellors practise psychotherapy to modify a client's behaviour and perception. They usually work with patients with mild to severe mental issues, such as trauma, addiction and substance abuse. Mental health counsellors also work in conjunction with psychiatrists for individuals with medication needs.

== Marriage and Family Therapist ==
Marriage and family therapists perform assessment and treatment over mental and emotional problems in families and couples. LCPC employed as marriage and family therapists utilize techniques of family systems to help clients get over crisis and improve communication. They also give treatment to families dealing with drug use and mental disorders. Group therapy is often incorporated with individual therapy in this type of issue.

== Educational and Vocational Counsellor ==
Educational and vocational counsellors provide evaluation and advice for academic, social and career issues. Their target clients are typically individuals with social and academic problems, as well as special needs. Educational and vocational counsellors also manage educational and career programs.

== Ethics ==
Canadian Counselling and Psychotherapy Association (CCPA) has developed a Standards of Practice to provide guidelines to enable its members, and other counsellors in Canada, to conduct themselves in a professional and ethical manner. The Standards of Practice supports statutory and professional self-regulation by establishing a shared set of expectations related to the many areas of counsellor activities and responsibilities. It also helps the public to meet their expectations for quality counselling services. These standards of Practice are directed primarily at the professional conduct of counsellors. However, they extend to the personal actions of counsellors. Many of the standards are generic in nature and cannot anticipate every situation or address all the ethical challenges. Therefore, it is a responsibility for all counsellors to contribute to the ongoing development of standards.

== Respect of rights ==
Counsellors show respect for human dignity, principles of equity and social justice, and speak out or take other appropriate actions against practices, policies, laws, and regulations that directly or indirectly bring harm to others or violate their human rights. LCPCs practise in a manner congruent with the overarching principles of the Universal Declaration of Human Rights. Counsellors respect due process and follow procedures based on the principles of social justice and principles of equity in all their professional activities.

== Diversity ==
Counsellors should be aware of the barriers that may hinder members of minority groups from seeking or gaining access to mental health services. Counsellors should also be aware of and sensitive to cultural biases that may be inherent in certain assessment tools and procedures and particularly those associated with certain counselling practices.

== Confidentiality ==
Counsellors have a fundamental ethical responsibility to take every reasonable precaution to respect and to safeguard their clients' right to confidentiality, and to protect from inappropriate disclosure, any information generated within the counselling relationship.

== Informed consent ==
Informed consent is essential to counsellors' respect for the clients' rights to self-determination. Consent must be given voluntarily, knowingly, and intelligently.
