= Tiffany Derry =

American chef based in Dallas, Texas

- Born: December 26, 1982 (age 43); Beaumont, Texas, U.S.
- Education: The Art Institute of Houston
- Relatives: Andre Fenley (cousin)
- Culinary career
- Current restaurants
- Roots Chicken Shak, Plano (2017–), Roots Southern Table, Farmers Branch (2021–), Radici Wood Fired Grill, Farmers Branch (2024–)
- Previous restaurants
- Private|Social, Dallas (2011–2013), The Cupboard by Tiffany Derry (2015–2018)
- Television shows
- Top Chef: D.C. (2010); Top Chef: All-Stars (2011); Cutthroat Kitchen (2013); Bar Rescue (2013 -); Hungry Investors (2014); Tournament of Champions (2022 and 2023); The Great American Recipe (PBS) (2022 -); Bobby's Triple Threat (2022 -); Worst Cooks in America (2024); BBQ Brawl (2024); MasterChef (American TV series) (2025 -)
- Website: www.tiffanyderryconcepts.com

Tiffany Derry (born December 26, 1982) is an American celebrity chef and restaurateur. She is a current judge on Master Chef, a Top Chef television series alumna and is known for her appearances on Cutthroat Kitchen and Hungry Investors (Spike TV). She is based in Dallas, Texas.

== Early life ==
Derry was born in Beaumont, Texas. She is African American.

Derry graduated from The Art Institute of Houston in 2003 with an Associate of Applied Science degree in culinary arts. She started her culinary career at the local International House of Pancakes at the age of 15, where she later had a management position.

== Restaurant career ==
Derry was the chef and owner of "Private|Social" in Dallas from 2011 to 2013. In 2012, Derry founded her professional website promoting her culinary career and her restaurant, "Private|Social." In 2013, Derry expressed interest in opening her own restaurant in her hometown of Beaumont.

Derry has also worked with the Dallas Independent School District to improve their school lunch program in order to provide healthier options.

Derry opened Roots Chicken Shak in Plano in 2017.

Derry, partnering with investor Tom Foley of T2D Concepts and Indigo Group, opened Roots Southern Table in June 2021 in Farmers Branch, Texas as an expansion concept to Roots Chicken Shak. The concept is chef driven and the menu consists of high end twists to the classic southern recipes Derry grew up with. Roots Southern Table was included in the "2021 Restaurants List" by The New York Times, as one of the fifty best American restaurants of the year.

== Television appearances ==
Derry competed in Top Chef season 7 in Washington, D.C. and won "fan favorite" after placing fifth. She also competed among the All-Star chefs in season 8 and finished fourth as a finalist.

Derry appeared on an episode of Spike TV's Bar Rescue in June 2013, and has appeared in a commercial promoting her alma mater, The Art Institute of Houston. She has occasionally appeared on other episodes of Bar Rescue from time to time.

In November 2013, she was the day's winner on an episode of Food Network's Cutthroat Kitchen and she started to appear on the Spike TV series Hungry Investors, which debuted in 2014.

In 2022 she became one of the competing chefs on the Bobby Flay series Bobby's Triple Threat, and in 2022 and 2023, Derry was on Guy Fieri's television series, Tournament of Champions, seasons 3 and 4.

She has hosted two seasons of Worst Cooks in America, with Anne Burrell in season 27, and Jeff Mauro in season 30.

In 2025, Derry joined MasterChef as a judge, alongside judges Gordon Ramsay and Joe Bastianich. On October 9, 2025, it was announced that the series was renewed for a sixteenth and seventeenth season and that Derry would be returning as a judge.

== Awards ==
In 2013, Derry was awarded the Hall of Fame by the Association of Private Sector Colleges and Universities.
