= Kevin Bludso =

American chef, entrepreneur, and television personality

- Born: 1965 (age 60–61); Compton, California, U.S.
- Culinary career
- Cooking style: American
- Current restaurants: Bludso's Bar & Cue; San Antone
- Previous restaurant: Bludso's BBQ
- Television show: The American Barbecue Showdown

Kevin Bludso (born 1965) is an American chef, restaurateur, and television personality.

== Early life ==
Bludso was born in 1965 in Compton, California. His father was a police officer at the Los Angeles Police Department; his mother was a postal service worker. While on summer vacation, Bludso lived with his aunt, Willie Mae Fields, in Corsicana, Texas. Fields introduced him to Texas-style barbecue; at the age of 9 or 10, Bludso was allowed to help with the cooking. He studied business at the Dallas-based Bishop College.

== Career ==
Prior to entering the food industry, Bludso worked as a correctional officer for thirteen years. He opened Bludso's BBQ in 2008, serving as its pitmaster. Based in Compton, the restaurant shut down in September 2016, following a dispute with the landlord. Bludso also owns restaurants in Hollywood and Melbourne, Australia. Since 2020, Bludso serves as a judge on the Netflix series The American Barbecue Showdown.

== Personal life ==
As of September 2020, Bludso resides in Texas. He is a fan of the Dallas Cowboys.

== Restaurants owned by Bludso ==
=== United States ===
Restaurant	Location	Date opened	Date closed
Bludso's BBQ	Compton, California	2008	September 2016
Bludso's Bar & Que	Hollywood, California	2013	
Bludso's Bar-B-Que	The Proud Bird Food Bazaar, California	2017	
Bludso's BBQ	Banc of California Stadium, California	2018	

=== Australia ===
Restaurant	Location	Date opened	Date closed
San Antone	Crown Melbourne, Southbank, Victoria	November 10, 2015	June 25, 2023

== Television appearances ==
- Diners, Drive-Ins and Dives (2013, 2023)
- Bar Rescue (2015–present)
- Fire Masters (2019)
- BBQ Brawl (2019)
- The American Barbecue Showdown (2020–2024)
- Barbeque Smoke out on Tastemade (2026-present)
