= Jon Taffer =

American television host (born 1954)

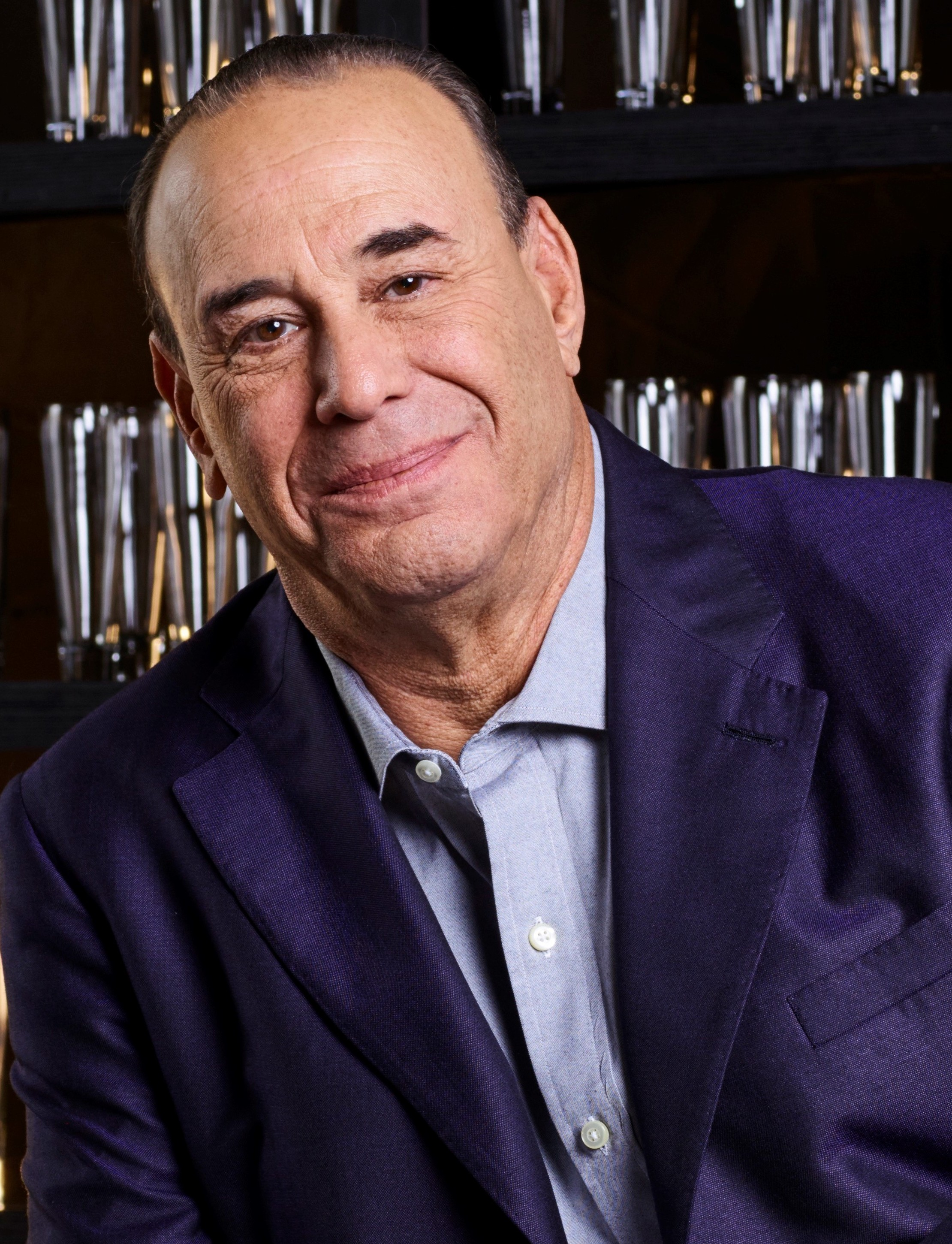
- Taffer in 2019
- Born: Jonathan Peter Cass; November 7, 1954 (age 71); Great Neck, New York, U.S.
- Education: University of Denver (attended)
- Occupations: Entrepreneur; hospitality consultant; television personality; author
- Years active: 1973–present
- Known for: Bar Rescue; Hungry Investors
- Spouse: Nicole Taffer (m. 2000)
- Children: 1
- Taffer's voice On failure, scarcity, and excuses in business
- Website: jontaffer.com

Jonathan Peter Taffer (né Cass; born November 7, 1954) is an American entrepreneur and television personality. He is best known for hosting the reality series Bar Rescue on Paramount Network and Face the Truth on CBS with Vivica A. Fox.

== Early life ==
Taffer was born in Great Neck, New York, on November 7, 1954, to Russian-Jewish parents. His father died from a heart attack in 1956, and Jon took his surname from his second stepfather, Lester Taffer. He graduated from William A. Shine Great Neck South High School in Great Neck in 1972, and after a short time at the University of Denver studying political science and minoring in cultural anthropology, he relocated to Los Angeles.

== Career ==
Taffer was born into a family of entrepreneurs. He first worked as a bartender in 1973 for Barney's Beanery in West Hollywood while performing as a drummer in a band.

Taffer's first bar management job was at The Troubadour night club in West Hollywood in 1978. In 1981, he was given full control of the bar, where staff theft was common. He opened his first bar as owner in 1989.

In 1989, Taffer patented an apparatus and method for selecting and playing music. The patented system includes a set of color-coded books containing listings of music on records available to an establishment, indexed by energy, type, and tempo.

Taffer is credited with creating the NFL Sunday Ticket pay programming package, which was launched in 1994, and was instrumental in the marketing, distribution and sales programs of that endeavor, for which he served on the board of NFL Enterprises for three years.

In 2010, he was appointed as president of the Nightclub and Bar Media Group, a division of Questex Media Group, which is responsible for Nightclub & Bar Magazine as well as the annual Nightclub & Bar Convention and Trade Show.

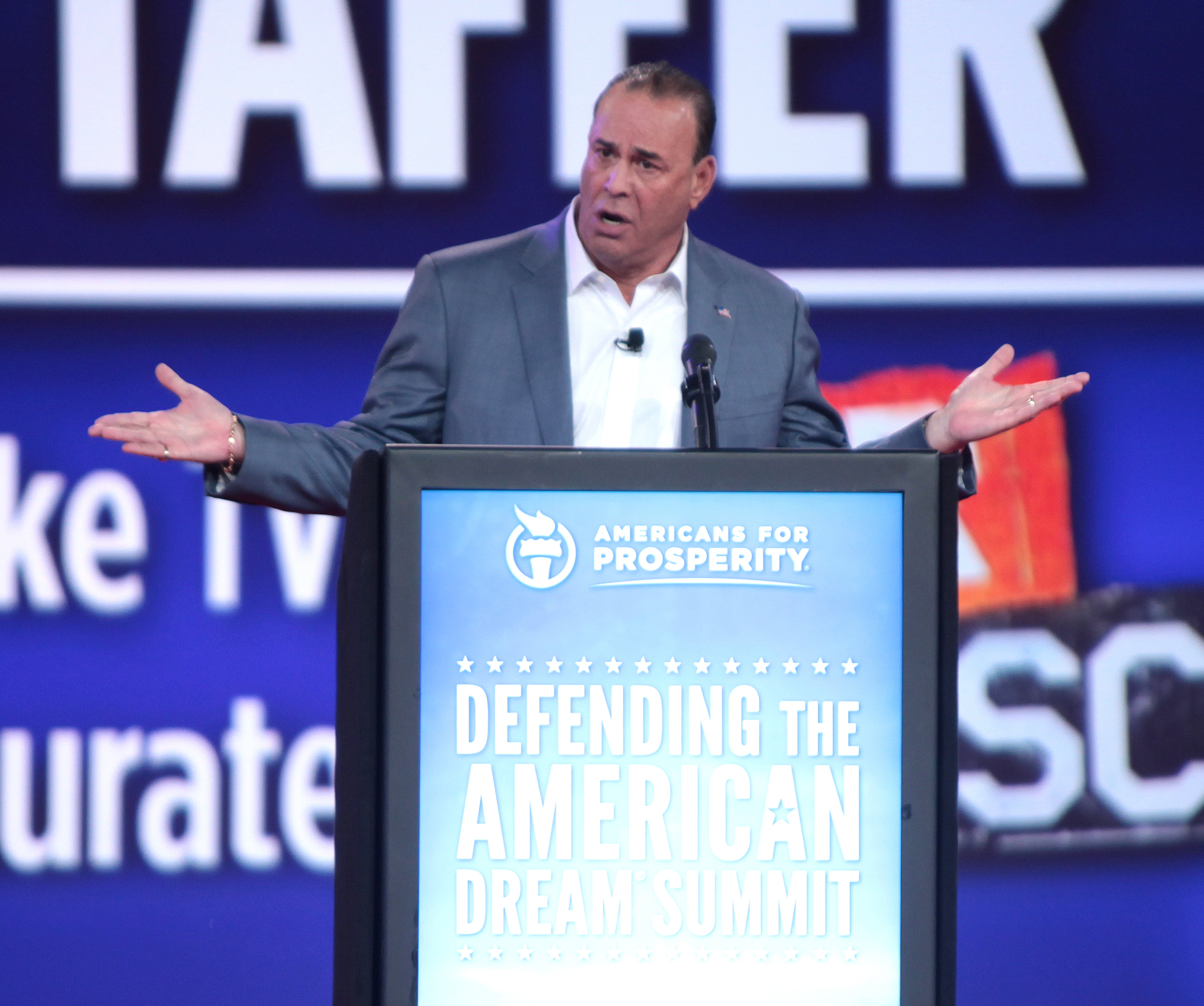
Taffer at the 2015 Defending the American Dream Summit

He was one of the first six inductees in the Nightclub Hall of Fame. On July 17, 2011, a reality television series, Bar Rescue, premiered on Spike TV (now the Paramount Network), that follows Taffer as he revitalizes failing bars and nightclubs across the United States. His wife Nicole occasionally appears on the show as a mystery shopper who assesses the quality of the bar before Taffer does the makeover.

In October 2013, New Harvest published Raise the Bar: An Action-Based Method for Maximum Customer Reactions, a book by Taffer and co-writer Karen Kelly, detailing the knowledge that Taffer acquired over the course of 40 years in the bar and nightlife business.

In November 2014, Taffer developed BarHQ, an all-inclusive bar and nightclub management app.

Taffer has a podcast called No Excuses, in which he interviews celebrity guests and discusses current events. New episodes premiere on Tuesdays on the PodcastOne network.

In 2018, Taffer became one of the hosts on CBS television series Face the Truth.

In May 2019, it was announced that Taffer would host a Paramount Network spinoff show called Marriage Rescue, where he would work to save couples' failing relationships. The spinoff series premiered on June 2, 2019. The series follows 12 couples as Taffer uses the Gestalt therapy to help them work through their issues. Marriage Rescue was not renewed for a second season.

Taffer has appeared as a guest on Fox News programs, including Gutfeld! and Fox News Saturday Night.

== Personal life ==
Taffer lives in Las Vegas. He has been married to his wife Nicole since 2000 and has a daughter named Samantha from a previous marriage.

=== Political views ===
In 2021, he agreed with Fox News host Laura Ingraham's comparison of Americans receiving temporary unemployment benefits due to the COVID-19 pandemic to dogs that must be kept hungry in order to elicit obedience. He later apologized, and it was revealed that his LLC accepted nearly $61,000 of government PPP loans during the pandemic.

When Donald Trump was elected as president in 2016, Jon Taffer praised Trump's economic policy, saying his tax cuts and deregulation would increase profits, benefit small businesses, and support restaurant industry employers and their employees. He is a critic of the rising minimum wage, believing it leads to increased automation and less hours worked, leading to less pay for American workers; he states he believes this to be especially true regarding popular New York restaurants. In 2019, he predicted technology could possibly replace restaurant workers in seven years due to the rising minimum wage.
