= Bar Rescue season 3 =

Bar Rescue
- Season 3
- promotional poster for Season 3
- No. of episodes: 40 (Including 3 removed episodes)

Release
- Original network: Spike
- Original release: February 10, 2013 – May 11, 2014

Season chronology
- ← Previous; Season 2 Next → Season 4

The third season of the American reality show Bar Rescue premiered on February 10, 2013, and concluded on May 11, 2014. The Spike series stars renowned nightlife consultant Jon Taffer who offers his professional expertise plus renovations and equipment to desperately put failing bars in order to save them from closing. This season was split into multiple parts.

== Experts ==
- Jon Taffer – Host/Star/Bar Consultant/Recon Spy
- Nicole Taffer – Host's Wife/Marketing/Recon Spy

=== Culinary ===
- Ron Duprat
- Brian Duffy
- Aaron McCargo
- Jason Febres
- J.B. Brown
- Nick Liberato
- Tiffany Derry
- Tony Gemignani
- Brendan Collins
- Stretch – Culinary Expert/Fabricator
- Kevin Bludso
- Celina Tio
- Anthony Lamas
- Vic "Vic Vegas" Moea
- Eric Regan

=== Mixology ===
- Ricky Gomez
- Joseph Brooke
- Elayne Duke-Duff
- Peter O'Connor
- Jenny Costa
- Russell Davis
- Franky Marshall
- Jen J
- Rachael Ford
- Adam Carmer
- Phil Wills
- Mia Mastroianni
- Trevor Frye
- Lisamarie Joyce
- Kate Gerwin
- Tony Devencenzi

=== Additional experts ===
- Jessie Barnes – Hospitality
- Tommy Gregory – Artist/Sculptor
- Doc – Security
- Dan "Big Cat" Katz – Karaoke
- Fred Medrano – Karaoke Specialist
- Owen Benjamin – Comedy
- Gianluca Rizza – Comedy Club
- Dominique Kelley – Choreography
- Anthony Curtis – Gaming Specialist
- Dave Gravino – Owner of Iggy's Doughboys & Chowder House/Consultant
- Sal Ferro – Contractor
- Steve Blovat – Health Inspector
- Brandy Starr – Hospitality
- John Naddour (a.k.a. HookahJohn) – Hookah

== Production ==
Taffer has confirmed that season 3 of the show began filming in late October 2012, with 20 episodes being prepared to premiere on February 10, 2013. Season 3 episodes were split into three parts with the first third premiering on February 10, 2013, while the second and final thirds aired on October 6, 2013, and March 9, 2014, respectively.

== Episodes ==
No. overall	No. in season	Title	Bar name	Location	Original release date	Prod. code	Viewers (millions)
21	1	"Turtle on Its Back"	Turtle Bay	New Orleans, Louisiana	February 10, 2013	301	1.04
The owner, Brad, has come to hard times when his work setting up the nearby bar Tropical Isle resulted in him being kicked out of the business. He builds his new bar, Turtle Bay, in the shadow of the Tropical Isle with an uninspired theme drawn heavily from his former work. The bar is so empty and unattractive that the recon team walk right past it. Taffer is highly critical of the bar's lack of identity, focusing especially on their signature drink, using the same gimmicky glass design and color as Tropical Isle's "Hand Grenade", and also their use of microwaved food. To make the bar stand out, Taffer remodels and rebranded the bar as "Spirits on Bourbon", playing on the ghostly theme, changing the bar's primary color to blue, creating unique cocktails such as the "Resurrection" and providing fresh, authentic Louisiana food. Note: For the recon in this episode, Jon brought in the bar manager and kitchen manager of The Black Sheep (re-branded as The Public House), featured in the sixth episode of Season 2. New Name: Spirits On Bourbon (Note: This bar has been sold.)
22	2	"Rock N Roaches"	Headhunters	Austin, Texas	February 17, 2013	303	1.46
Jon tries to save a roach-infested bar and deals with a stubborn owner who refuses to pay his employees. Note: Instead of doing the recon, Jon and his experts accompany Nicole instead of having her go in alone after reviewing the customer's point of view in addition to a disturbing concert that took place that night. This is one of the few rescues where the owner did not thank Jon for his help. New Name: Metal and Lace (Note: This bar has closed.)
23	3	"Bro's Got to Geaux!"	TJ Quills	New Orleans, Louisiana	February 24, 2013	302	1.28
Jon has a lot of work to do when he helps an owner and his frat brother friends who recently purchased a hangout notorious for bartenders who drink on the job and serve people with fake I.D.s. New Name: The Annex (Note: This bar reverted to its original name following the rescue.)
24	4	"Tears for Beers"	The Brixton	Austin, Texas	March 3, 2013	304	1.10
Jon has more than just a bar to fix when he helps a couple, the husband of which is belligerent, insulting to customers, and doesn't know how to make proper drinks, which threatens to derail everything they worked hard for. Note: This is the fourth bar that reverted to its name at the end of the episode. New Name: Rocket Room 6
25	5	"Empty Pockets"	Zanzbar	Denver, Colorado	March 10, 2013	305	1.55
Jon gets more than he bargains for when he has a face off with a very prideful and stubborn owner who is desperate to keep his bar alive after a car crash a few years back ruined its success when his old staff failed to control it while he was recovering. New Name: Solids & Stripes (Note: According to the owner in the first Back to the Bar episode, Solids & Stripes went back to its old name but the new name appears next to Zanzbar.)
26	6	"Jon T, He Don't Like It"	The Kasbah	Aurora, Colorado	March 17, 2013	306	1.37
Jon goes to work at a reformed night club that used to cater to an older crowd, but was forced to accommodate to the younger hip hop crowd. The bar staff is not trained, food is served in over-sized portions in Styrofoam takeaway containers, and security is very lax. Consequently, the night club has a bad reputation due to violence and gangs. Taffer orders a clean-out of the dirty kitchen and the team reduce portion sizes and forces the staff to serve on plates rather than in containers. The bar staff is trained in pouring techniques. Unusually for the show, Taffer brings in a third expert, specializing in security. During the stress test, Taffer plants liquor bottles on several patrons, which security guard Ron fails to find during pat-downs. Owner Shelton finally takes a stand against his lazy staff and fires Ron. In the next day's training, the kitchen develops fresh food items, the bar staff learn new cocktails, and the security team learn to diffuse fights, including Taffer's method of using a frozen towel to restrain women. The bar is remodeled with the improved decor, better lighting on the dance floor and a service station are installed. The security team manages to confiscate alcohol and drugs at the door. Chef Diego turns up drunk and belligerent and is fired by Shelton. Taffer is impressed with Shelton's renewed rigor, and the relaunch is successful. Note: Jon revisited the club almost four years later in a Back to the Bar special where he admits that he and Shelton cried when they went over the plans for the remodel. For the special, Jon checked out the club personally rather than sending one of his experts to do it. Jon discovered that not only did Shelton pay off his debts completely, but he has turned the Kasbah into an extremely profitable business with plans to retire and leave it to his son while Shelton moves to Florida. When asked about security issues, Shelton confirms that they have had no problems in over two years. New Name: N/A (Note: This bar kept its original name.)
27	7	"In a Pinch"	Lona's Wardlow Station	Long Beach, California	March 24, 2013	307	1.20
Jon works with a passive owner whose poor decisions, including putting in a controversial lobster crane game and her ignorant manager, has caused her bar to hit the rocks. New Name: Lona's City Limits Cantina (modernized version of old name)
28	8	"Karaoke Katastrophe"	Dimples	Burbank, California	March 31, 2013	308	1.17
When America's first karaoke bar is facing closure, Jon decides to go hands on to help this historic establishment. New Name: N/A
29	9	"A Horse Walks Into a Bar"	Kid Chilleen's Badass BBQ	Black Canyon City, Arizona	April 7, 2013	309	1.67
Jon heads to the Arizona desert to help a family-owned bar whose members drink on the job and allow running motorcycles and horses inside, creating health hazards for the customers. New Name: Chilleen's on 17 (modernized version of old name)
30	10	"Meat Sauna"	Stand Up, Scottsdale	Scottsdale, Arizona	April 14, 2013	310	1.10
Jon journeys to a comedy club, where he must assist the business with achieving more laughter and securing a larger amount of profit from the customers. Note: This episode does not air in reruns on Paramount Network, its website, app and on Paramount+. New Name: The Laugh Factory (Note: Stand Up, Scottsdale was negotiating for the right to be branded as a franchisee of the Laugh Factory but has since reverted to its original name of Stand up, Scottsdale!.)
31	11	"Don't Mess with Taffer's Wife"	Sand Dollar	Las Vegas, Nevada	July 7, 2013	311	1.75
A Las Vegas bar owner tries to pick up Nicole, leaving Jon in a frenzy and tough predicament. He also has to get the owner's partner to become a manager, get a new sound to attract more people and loosen gambling rules in their games. Note: Due to a lawsuit involving the Taffers and the bar's former owner, this episode no longer airs in reruns on Paramount Network or appears on the network's website and app. It also does not appear on Paramount+. This episode however can be purchased on Amazon Prime. New Name: Bar 702
32	12	"Don't Judge a Booze by Its Bottle"	Cashmere	Raleigh, North Carolina	July 14, 2013	316	1.52
Jon learns that a North Carolina nightclub has an immature and partying manager who is refilling premium liquor bottles with cheap alcohol, and must get the owner to hold him and his employees accountable to save his bar. New Name: Duæl Ultra Nightclub (The third letter is a superposition of "a" and "e", making the name both "Dual" and "Duel")
33	13	"Two Flew Over the Handlebars"	Handlebar Cafe	Pawcatuck, Connecticut	July 21, 2013	319	1.55
Jon tries to get two partying sisters to stop binge drinking in order to save a biker bar. Mixologist: Russell Davis, Chef: Brian Duffy New Name: Handlebar and Grill (modernized version of old name)
34	14	"There's No Crying in the Bar Business"	Barlow's	Tucker, Georgia	July 28, 2013	314	1.48
Jon must put an end to a feud between two owners, whose bitter resentment towards each other is allowing their staff to get away with theft, drinking on the job, and constant fighting at their failing sports bar. New Name: The Comeback
35	15	"Play. Some. Janet. Jackson!"	Gipsy	Las Vegas, Nevada	August 4, 2013	312	1.52
Jon looks to save Las Vegas' first gay nightclub from its verbally abusive and intoxicated owner. Note: This is the first episode whose epilogue specifically states that the bar has closed down since Jon's visit. In this case, the owner expressed his belief that the overhaul was a mistake, then closed the bar two days after its relaunch. New Name: SBLV (South Beach Las Vegas)
36	16	"Characters Assassination"	Characters Quarters	Garner, North Carolina	August 11, 2013	315	1.35
Jon deals with a Yankee family who is having trouble adapting to a more Dixie environment, mostly because the brother is a hot-head who verbally insults his family and staff, and the other members wear ridiculous costumes to support one of the worst concepts Jon has seen to date. The episode also had a flashback to the infamous Piratz Tavern episode. Note: During the "Back to the Bar" special, it was shown that not only is Moonrunners successful, they are scouting out a second location for a franchise. Later, they started a food truck business and the owner, Guy, use his vehicle to do a road trip across the US to visit Spirits on Bourbon and George & Dragon before heading to Jon's place for another Back to the Bar special. Part of the food truck's artistic design is a drawing of Jon himself with the caption "shut it down," which Jon often says when he shuts down a bar during a rescue. New Name: Moonrunners Saloon
37	17	"Corking the Hole"	Cliques	Hope Mills, North Carolina	August 18, 2013	317	1.43
Jon must humble an arrogant and condescending U.S. Marine/bar owner who bulldogs his employees and fails to capture the local military personnel due to poor design choices. New Name: 22 Klicks
38	18	"A Bar Full of Bull"	Libad's Bar & Grill	New Bedford, Massachusetts	August 25, 2013	318	1.51
Jon tries to help two siblings who are wasting their father's retirement with a rickety mechanical bull, get hold of their inexperienced, over-pouring bartenders, and help them recover from a family loss that had the owners closing the kitchen, in a New England whaling community. Note: This is the first episode in which the owner watches the recon with Jon. New Name: Libad's Seaside Tavern (modernized version of old name)
39	19	"Beer and Loathing in Las Vegas"	The Hammer	Las Vegas, Nevada	September 8, 2013	313	1.30
Jon helps repair the strained relationship of two classically trained chefs who have a blue collar bar in desperate need of help. (Note: During the stress test, Jon Taffer discovered that some of the meat was at a temperature that would have rendered it unsafe to serve. But rather than throw the profits in the trash, one of the chefs initially decided to put the tainted meat back into the reach-in (He was convinced by the other chef to dispose of the meat). Taffer overheard the comment, and after the stress test he severely reprimanded the chef.) New Name: Hammer & Ales (modernized version of old name)
40	20	"Barely Above Water"	Marley's on the Beach	Warwick, Rhode Island	September 15, 2013	320	1.27
Jon tries to save a marriage and a bar by splitting one bar into two, but has trouble with an inexperienced staff, including a good, but frustrated cook, and the husband not doing anything to help. First time the landlord and rival business owner appear as part of the recon team. New Name: St. Michelle's Beach Club (Note: St. Michelle's Beach Club had combined the old and new names, becoming known as Marley's Beach Club.)
41	21	"Crappy Cantina"	Rocky Point Cantina	Tempe, Arizona	October 6, 2013	321	1.12
Jon must do a reality check on a bar whose oblivious owner, ill-conceived death metal theme, and filthy bathrooms are driving away the college-age crowd. Note: For this episode, Jon's experts access the problems in the bar without him being there. He stays outside and watches footage of their visit, then enters the next morning after the staff has cleaned the bar. New Name: Havana Cabana
42	22	"Jon of the Dead"	The Underworld Grill & Bar	Las Vegas, Nevada	October 13, 2013	322	1.19
Jon encounters poor food service, tacky decor, and deep distrust between employees and management as he tries to save a Halloween/horror-themed bar run by two former rockers. New Name: The End
43	23	"Grandpa Got Run Over by His Grandkids"	Kerry's Sports Pub	Las Vegas, Nevada	October 20, 2013	323	1.37
Jon confronts a bar owner's adult grandchildren, whose lax oversight of inventory and money handling have brought the bar close to failure. Note: This is the second episode where the owner watches the recon with Jon. New Name: Bacon Bar
44	24	"Hurricane Jon vs. Hurricane Sandy"	Bungalow Bar	Rockaway, New York	October 27, 2013	999	1.04
Jon faces the triple challenge of rebuilding a successful bar that was nearly destroyed by Hurricane Sandy, getting the five brothers who own it to set aside their disagreements, and retraining staff members who are long out of practice. Note: For this episode, the staff training and stress test were done at a bar in Manhattan, since the Bungalow Bar was undergoing extensive reconstruction. Prior to the grand re-opening, the owners of Turtle Bay (re-branded as Spirits on Bourbon, episode 1 of season 3) visited to present the staff with a new set of souvenir cups and T-shirts and a $5,000 donation. As Jon prepared to leave, the owners presented him with an autographed picture of an American flag raised amid Hurricane Sandy's floodwaters, framed with wood taken from the portions of the Rockaway Beach Boardwalk that were destroyed in the storm. This is also the first bar that was not a failure prior to an overhaul, but a way for Jon to give back to his community. New Name: Bungalow Bar & Restaurant (modernized version of old name)
45	25	"Drunk & Dirty Dolls" (Note: "Attack of the Yummy Mommies" was the original title for this episode.)	The Alibi	Las Vegas, Nevada	November 3, 2013	324	1.21
A motorsports bar's female-unfriendly theme and its employees' vulgar behavior - including display of a sex doll - prompt Jon to push the owner to reassert control over the business. New Name: Garnet Lounge
46	26	"Empty Bottles Full Cans"	MT Bottle	Murfreesboro, Tennessee	November 10, 2013	325	1.02
A Tennessee bar without a liquor license has severe sanitation problems in the kitchen and basement, female bartenders who routinely flash their boobs at customers, and an owner who has a reputation for ingenuity yet leaves all the hands-on work to his wife. Note: Big Smo, who used to perform at MT Bottle, joins Jon to watch the recon. He later appeared during the grand re-opening of the bar's new name. In addition, mixologist Russell Davis almost injured himself during the stress test due to the slippery floor of the bar. New Name: Bottles & Cans (Note: In "Back to the Bar: Empty Pockets", Bottles & Cans has combined the old and new names, becoming known as MT Bottles & Cans.)
47	27	"Hole in None"	Fairways Golf & Grill	Murfreesboro, Tennessee	November 17, 2013	326	1.36
Surveillance on a golf-themed bar reveals terrible sanitary conditions and incompetence in the kitchen, which is run by the owner's friend, that threaten to ruin the owner's investment, unless Jon can get the borderline-oblivious owner to take control and fix things up. New Name: Brew U
48	28	"Music City Mess"	BoondoxXx BBQ & Juke Joint	Nashville, Tennessee	November 25, 2013	327	N/A
A country music snob with an explosive personality turns to Jon for help. Note: This episode was originally billed as the 28th episode, but on the day of the airing, the owner of the bar was arrested for allegedly shooting and killing country singer Wayne Mills during an argument. Spike pulled the episode, which was scheduled at 9:00 PM on the 24th, and replaced it with a rerun. An oversight by the network, however, led to the intended 12:00 AM encore on the 25th airing as scheduled and drawing complaints from viewers. New Name: Pit & Barrel
49	29	"Brawlin' Babes"	Long Shots Sports Bar	Grain Valley, Missouri	December 8, 2013	328	1.30
Jon must help a sports bar's owner and staff overcome long-held infighting, poor training, and a lack of publicity and promotion in order to succeed against the local competition. New Name: Badlands Country Nightclub
50	30	"Twin vs. Twin"	R.G.'s Lounge	Independence, Missouri	December 15, 2013	330	1.61
When a personal feud between twin brothers threatens the future of the bar they own, one brother's son calls Jon in to save the business. Note: The son of one brother, who is also the nephew of the other brother, works with Jon ahead of time to give him inside information on the bar's problems in addition to watching the recon with him. New Name: BARcode
51	31	"Hostile Takeover"	O'Banion's Bar & Grill	Bellevue, Nebraska	March 9, 2014	331	1.35
When an owner's heavy drinking and loud antics threaten the bar's fortune, Jon must get the owner's brother and his best friend, who together hold a majority stake, to overrule him and act to save the bar. Note: Two of the three co-owners join Jon to watch the recon. This is also the first episode where he performed a hostile takeover. New Name: Sorties Tavern
52	32	"Critters and Quitters"	KC's Bar & Grill	Shawnee, Kansas	March 16, 2014	329	1.50
Jon must make a members-only club into an asset, but has trouble with a carefree owner and his aloof son, bartenders who over-pour, a manager who is set to take over but has little power, and a raccoon infestation that poses a major health hazard. Note: After turning the bar around, Jon was presented with a raccoon hat and a membership card for the bar. New Name: Johnson County Line
53	33	"Punch-Drunk & Trailer-Trashed"	O'Face Bar	Council Bluffs, Iowa	March 23, 2014	333	1.65
Jon Taffer and mixologist Russell are called to rescue a trailer bar whose staff is more interested in getting drunk and having fun than running an establishment. Server Cerissa and bouncer Bryan (nicknamed "Syck") get the brunt of it, being the only ones to showing concern for the patrons or the business. Jon can't even start the recon, let alone train the staff, due to their drunken self-centered antics, including a bar brawl between employees which ends with the defending party fired despite Taffer's orders. After a long string of total failures, Jon does a full business background check, uncovering numerous reports of violent behavior, and ultimately walks out as a result. This is the first rescue Taffer has ever aborted. Note: On February 4, 2016, the owner Matt was arrested on suspicion of second-degree sexual abuse and assault with intent to commit sexual abuse by the Pottawattamie County Sheriff's Office. He served 90 days in jail and was released on April 4, 2017, but was arrested again 10 days later for not registering as a sex offender as part of his plea deal. New Name: N/A (Note: This bar was not rescued.)
54	34	"Scoreboard to Death"	Scoreboard	Norwalk, California	March 30, 2014	336	1.45
Jon is joined by celebrity guests Maria Menounos and Adam Carolla as he takes over a failing sports bar, wrangles with an incompetent owner whose father owns the building as a whole, and an undertrained staff. Note: Maria and AfterBuzzTV co-creator Kevin Undergaro went undercover during the recon. New Name: Agave Junction Cantina
55	35	"Grow Some Meatballs!!"	The Tailgate	Santa Clarita, California	April 6, 2014	334	1.34
Jon must mend the relationship between the owners and their father, who's fed up with the staff's unruly behavior, but can't do anything since the owners are too lenient and refuse to fire them. However, when one of the employees causes a disaster in the kitchen, Jon must convince them otherwise. Note: During the Back to the Bar special, despite the bar being sold, the new owners decided to keep it as the same thing that Jon has rescued. New Name: The Shot Exchange
56	36	"Taxed Out in Texas"	Bryant's Ice House	Katy, Texas	April 13, 2014	337	1.47
Jon must give a bar a major overhaul, from the staff to the name, when a tax-accountant-turned-owner bought it and the bad reputation and that it gained a few years back, whilst dealing with bartenders who spend more time drinking and creating drama, and one of the worst locations he's dealt with. New Name: The Wildcatter Saloon
57	37	"When Life Doesn't Hand You Lemons"	Pat's Cocktails	Valley Village, California	April 20, 2014	335	1.62
Jon recruits the bar's bartenders to get inside help about the bar's problems and must get the manager to stop treating the place like a romantic playground, while convincing the owner to go more hands on with his business. New Name: N/A
58	38	"I Smell A Rat"	Oasis Hookah Bar	Omaha, Nebraska	April 27, 2014	332	1.90
Finding a hookah bar plagued by unsanitary smoking equipment, putrid odors, an inexperienced manager, and an owner who lets his staff run wild, Jon wonders if the bar's concept can ever turn a profit. New Name: Taza Nightclub (Note: In "Back to the Bar: Delusional Owners", Taza Nightclub brought back the hookah after the rescue and changed its name to Taza Hookah Bar.)
59	39	"Scary Mary's"	Mary's Outpost	Grand Prairie, Texas	May 4, 2014	339	1.76
Jon faces off with an owner who is lecherous and disrespectful towards women patrons, treats his wife/general manager with little respect, and gives away his products, after he crosses the line with one of his experts. New Name: Thirsty's Roadside Bar
60	40	"Muscle Madness"	The End Zone Sports Bar and Grill	Houston, Texas	May 11, 2014	338	1.62
Two meatheads' tempers and testosterone threaten their friendship and their Houston bar, forcing Jon to address not only their management style, but their personal issues. New Name: Houston Sports Hub

== Controversies ==
=== Lawsuit ===
Jon and Nicole Taffer, along with the show's production company Bongo LLC, have been sued by Dr. Paul T. Wilkes from Bar 702 (formerly Sand Dollar). In "Don't Mess with Taffer's Wife", the bar and its staff were featured in, Paul is shown to hit on Nicole and Jon yells at him in retaliation. However, he claims that in reality that the producers ordered him to be sleazy and make offensive comments on women and texted him to "Hit on Mrs. Taffer hardcore!!" After he did so, instead of "setting him straight", the doctor claims that Taffer allegedly called the control room to tell them to have a drink near the spot where he intended to confront Dr. Wilkes, so he could throw it in his face and said to a colleague "Now I'm going to show you why my show is Number One." Dr. Wilkes then claimed that Jon Taffer came in to confront him and showed him footage of his audition tapes where he insulted the way Jon dressed. Jon then grabbed the drink in his hand, threw it in his face, and smashed the cup in his face. Jon then spit in his face and tore off his shirt so violently that buttons ripped off his shirt. Jon then picked up the second drink that was planted and threw it in Dr. Wilkes' face. After that, Jon swung at Dr. Wilkes' head with his electronic tablet and turned around to get his coat. Dr. Wilkes thought Taffer was going for a weapon, so he tried to restrain him and was punched in his left jaw by him. Jon Taffer began hyperventilating and collapsed on the floor with the entire attack caught on camera. As a result of this attack, Dr. Wilkes claims he suffers from emotional distress and symptoms such as migraines, nausea, vomiting, night terrors, crying spells, severe depression, and anxiety attacks. There is currently no update on the lawsuit.

=== Wayne Mills murder ===
During the taping for the episode "Music City Mess", Taffer visited BoondoxXx BBQ & Juke Joint in Nashville, Tennessee and worked with owner Chris Ferrell who was noted for having a hot temper. The rescued bar was renamed Pit & Barrel and the episode featuring the bar was to air on November 24, 2013 but on the night before the episode was supposed to air, Ferrell was arrested by Nashville police for shooting and killing country singer Wayne Mills during an argument inside Pit & Barrel. Spike immediately pulled the episode from its originally scheduled premiere slot. It did not, however, remove the episode completely and the regularly scheduled encore presentation of the episode, which aired in the early morning hours of November 25, accidentally served as the premiere. The network drew criticism for the error in light of the circumstances.

Ferrell eventually stood trial for the murder of Mills and asserted he acted in self-defense, claiming that Mills had violated the bar's nonsmoking rule and had threatened to kill him with a broken beer bottle. The jury, however, convicted Ferrell of second-degree murder in March 2015 after a long-delayed trial and he was given a twenty-year sentence of which Ferrell is required to complete in its entirety. The verdict and sentence were appealed, but were upheld by the appeals court in 2019.
