= Bar Rescue season 1 =

Bar Rescue
- Season 1
- Promotional poster for Season 1
- No. of episodes: 10

Release
- Original network: Spike
- Original release: July 17 – September 25, 2011

Season chronology
- Next → Season 2

The first season of the American reality series Bar Rescue premiered on Spike on July 17, 2011, and concluded on September 18, 2011, with a total of 10 episodes. The series stars renowned nightlife consultant Jon Taffer who offers his professional expertise plus renovations and equipment to desperately failing bars in order to save them from closing.

== Experts ==
- Jon Taffer – Host/Star/Bar Consultant/Recon Spy
- Nicole Taffer – Host's Wife/Marketing/Recon Spy

=== Culinary ===
- Brian Duffy
- Josh Capon
- Brian Hill
- Spike Mendelsohn
- Eric Greenspan

=== Mixology ===
- Michael Tipps
- Keith Raimondi
- Elayne Duke
- Tobin Ellis
- Peter O’Connor
- Brian Van Flandern

=== Other special experts ===
- Nancy Hadley – Concept/Interior Design
- Deborah Maguire – Hospitality
- Ed Warnick – Retired Health Inspector

== Production ==
Spike originally picked the series up for 10 episodes in January 2011 but was reduced to 8 episodes. The show began shooting in April 2011.

== Episodes ==
| No. overall | No. in season | Title | Bar name | Location | Original release date | Prod. code | Viewers (millions) |
|---|---|---|---|---|---|---|---|
| 1 | 1 | "Fallen Angels" | Angels Sports Bar | Corona, California | July 17, 2011 | 102 | 0.74 |
Jon heads to California to help a bar whose general manager has been so hands off, he's caused so many problems that badly affected the owner's reputation. New Name: Racks Billiards & Bourbon (Note: This bar has closed.)
| 2 | 2 | "Downey's and Out" | Downey's Irish Pub | Philadelphia, Pennsylvania | July 24, 2011 | 105 | 1.00 |
Jon goes to Philadelphia to help a one-time chef regain his confidence and backbone in his failing pub. New Name: N/A (Note: This bar kept its original name.)
| 3 | 3 | "Shabby Abbey" | The Abbey Pub | Chicago, Illinois | July 31, 2011 | 104 | 0.99 |
When brothers who own a legendary pub feud over how management is running it, Jon must step in and get them on the same page. New Name: N/A (Note: Although the concert hall kept the name of The Abbey, the pub was rebranded as The Green Room @ the Abbey.)
| 4 | 4 | "Beach Bummer" | Kilkenny's Irish Pub | Redondo Beach, California | August 7, 2011 | 101 | 1.19 |
A pub in California, with a tough and rude manager and owners who won't do anything about it, gets help from Jon. New Name: Breakwall
| 5 | 5 | "Swanky Troubles" | Swanky Bubbles | Philadelphia, Pennsylvania | August 14, 2011 | 106 | 1.26 |
When a once successful bar suffers from an owner blindsiding his partner by offering free drinks and harassing women, Jon must get the partner to set him straight before the bar shuts down. Note: This is the first episode where the bar reverted to its old name at the end of the episode. New Name: Sheer (Note: This bar has reverted to its original name following the rescue.)
| 6 | 6 | "The Blue Frog Sings The Blues" | The Blue Frog 22 | Chicago, Illinois | August 21, 2011 | 103 | 1.06 |
When a mother's bad habits get in the way of her relationship with her son and running their bar, Jon must convince her to give up her habits before the damage is done. New Name: The Local (Note: The Local had combined the old and new names following the rescue, becoming known as Blue Frog's Local 22.)
| 7 | 7 | "Bad To The Bone" | The Chicken Bone | Framingham, Massachusetts | August 28, 2011 | 109 | 1.05 |
Jon has his work cut out for him when he confronts an owner whose bad decisions and inability to trust his manager threaten to ruin his bar and finances. New Name: The Bone (modernized version of old name)
| 8 | 8 | "Chumps" | Champs Sports Pub | Burbank, California | September 11, 2011 | 107 | 1.31 |
Jon helps a once iconic bar that suffers from the owner being neglectful and blaming his inexperienced staff for the problems. New Name: N/A
| 9 | 9 | "Bar Fight" | The Canyon Inn | Yorba Linda, California | September 18, 2011 | 108 | 1.04 |
Jon helps a baseball player turned owner update his dive bar, but not without some opposition. Note: This is the first bar to not have either a stress test or a soft opening. It is also the second bar to revert to its old name during the epilogue, when the owner changed the name of "Canyon Saloon" back to the "Canyon Inn". New Name: The Canyon Saloon (modernized version of old name)
| 10 | 10 | "Hogtied Ham's" | Angry Ham's Garage | Framingham, Massachusetts | September 25, 2011 | 110 | 1.10 |
Jon heads to Massachusetts to help a failing garage themed bar that includes an offensive name, poor decoration placement, an owner who treat his employees as friends and can't have a liquor license due to two of the owners having past D.U.I.. New Name: Octane
