= Bar Rescue season 2 =

Bar Rescue
- Season 2
- Promotional poster for Season 2
- No. of episodes: 10

Release
- Original network: Spike
- Original release: July 29 – September 30, 2012

Season chronology
- ← Previous; Season 1 Next → Season 3

The second season of the American reality show Bar Rescue premiered on July 29 to September 30, 2012, on Spike, consisting of a total of 10 episodes. The series stars renown nightlife consultant Jon Taffer who offers his professional expertise plus renovations and equipment to desperately failing bars in order to save them from closing.

== Experts ==
- Jon Taffer – Host/Star/Bar Consultant
- Nicole Taffer – Host's Wife/Marketing/Recon Spy
- Samantha "Sam" Taffer – Host's Daughter/Mixologist/Recon Spy

=== Culinary ===
- Josh Capon
- Brian Duffy
- Keith Jones
- Aaron McCargo

=== Mixology ===
- Elayne Duke
- Terrelle Treco
- Chris Cardone
- Jenny Costa
- Kat Munday
- Joe Meyer
- Peter O'Connor
- Michael Tipps
- Jason Bran
- Joseph Brooke

=== Additional experts ===
- Nancy Hadley – Concept/Interior Design
- Jessie Barnes – Hospitality
- DJ Green Lantern – DJ

== Production ==
On September 14, 2011, Spike renewed Bar Rescue for a second season for Summer 2012.

Season 2 is best known for the season premiere where Jon attempted to rescue the train wreck that was a pirate themed bar called Piratz Tavern. The bar quickly undid all of Taffer's drastic changes shortly after their episode was filmed. The unsuccessful pirate-themed bar was rebranded Corporate Bar and Grill by Taffer but the change was short-lived, as the bar was again going with the pirate theme by the time the episode aired. The owner even released a YouTube video of the new "Corporate" sign created by Taffer's team being burned and shot at in effigy called Piratz Revenge which was heavily disliked by YouTube viewers and currently has only a positive rating of 4%. "If you had a pirate concept that had failed for five years and had a new concept, would you go back to the concept that failed for five years or try something new? ("We like pirates", they said) It defies logic that someone would go back to a (failed) concept just because they don't like the new name", said Taffer of their decision ("We still like pirates", they commented). The owners blamed the "negative publicity" on the show. Piratz was revisited as part of the Back to the Bar episode, where Taffer graded the bar an "epic fail"; the owner wanted to seek a second rescue. Within a week of the episode's airing, however, Piratz decided to close its doors for good. The owners resurfaced in season four where Jon brought them and their daughter in to do recon for Freaki Tiki. In addition, they confirmed to him in another Back to the Bar episode that they are opening up a new bar in Florida called Bar Refuge.

Rock band Halestorm made an appearance during the grand opening of the now defunct Fairfield bar America Live (formerly known as Win, Place or Show).

== Episodes ==
No. overall	No. in season	Title	Bar name	Location	Original release date	Prod. code	Viewers (millions)
11	1	"Yo-Ho-Ho and a Bottle of Dumb"	Piratz Tavern	Silver Spring, Maryland	July 29, 2012	203	1.20
Tracy lives out the ultimate Peter Pan dream by running a pirate-themed bar. Jon sends in his wife, Nicole, to do recon, but she is met with a rather mild atmosphere and is served unusually politely. Nicole pulls out of the recon believing that the staff know who she is. Jon sends in his backup recon team dressed as pirates. They enter to find the bar deserted. After some time, they are served half-cooked, previously frozen food and a “Grog.” Jon confronts Tracy, who is unashamed of her establishment despite being $900,000 in debt and living in her parents' basement with her husband and 17-year-old daughter. The staff are also problematic, with the chef and husband Juciano having no training and the bar staff unwilling to change from their pirate ways. Juciano was adamant that he could cook well. Taffer heavily criticized Juciano’s cooking, saying "Your food is the worst I've ever seen, it stinks!" Recognizing that the bar has a practically non-existent market in Silver Spring, Jon remodels the bar into a corporate-themed bar and grill to capitalize on the nearby business district and lunch traffic. During the seemingly successful re-opening, Tracy and the staff began dressing and acting like pirates again, scaring their customers out of the bar; Tracy reverts to the pirate name and theme only a few days after the re-launch of the new bar. As of the airing of the episode, Tracy and Juciano are still acting like pirates. Note: For recon, Jon also brought in the owners of The Chicken Bone, featured in the seventh episode of Season 1. Piratz Tavern is the first bar to change back to its old name and theme. During the Back to the Bar episode, the bar is shown to be failing badly and requests a re-rescue. However, Jon is not sure he is willing to re-rescue it due to the disrespect the owners showed him, but he will consider it for the sake of their daughter. New Name: Corporate Bar & Grill (Note: This bar reverted to its original name following the rescue.) (Note: This bar has closed.)
12	2	"Tiki Curse"	The Bamboo Beach Tiki Bar	Fort Lauderdale, Florida	July 29, 2012	207	1.19
Frank owns one of several bars still allowed to operate directly on the attractive Florida beach. However, he has allowed his bar to fall into serious disrepair, the food and service are well below standard. Furthermore, he has become very lax with his staff, playing favorites and overlooking poor performance and punctuality, including allowing his bartenders to arrive four hours late or even not turning up at all. Taffer convinces Frank to fire his lazy staff, helps develop a tropical theme to the bar menu, and remodels the bar to repair years worth of neglect. New Name: Bamboo Beach Club & Tiki Bar (modernized version of old name)
13	3	"Murphy's Mess"	J.A. Murphy's	Fell's Point, Maryland	August 5, 2012	204	1.17
Jon goes to Baltimore to help two frat brother owners who don't know how to properly run a bar, including one whose arrogant and abrasive attitude has cost them key staff members. Note: This is the second bar to not have either a stress test or a soft opening; the bar was structurally unsound. New Name: Murphy's Law (modernized version of old name)
14	4	"Mystique or Murder?"	Mystique Lounge	West Palm Beach, Florida	August 12, 2012	208	1.04
Jon helps two club promoters who took over a once popular bar whose reputation is badly tarnished by not just a murder that took place a few years back, but also poor management, declining conditions, and a promoter who brings the wrong people. New Name: Aura Nightclub
15	5	"Bottomless Pit"	The Olive Pit	Orange, California	August 19, 2012	201	1.19
When the owner's drinking and behavior toward women threatens to shut down a long-running dive bar, Jon must get his daughter to step up and take over. New Name: The O.P (modernized version of old name)
16	6	"Broke Black Sheep"	The Black Sheep	Cheviot, Ohio	August 26, 2012	205	1.45
Jon has a long list to complete at Cheviot when he helps a bar owner who is too busy with his jobs to keep his Irish-German pub in check and has over $800,000 in loans that his family doesn't know about. New Name: The Public House
17	7	"Weber's of Lies"	Weber's Place	Reseda, California	September 9, 2012	209	1.32
Jon's attempts to refurbish a former strip-club-turned-bar in California are complicated by an untrained staff, a head bartender who steals from the till, and a kitchen serving dangerously undercooked food. Note: This episode was dedicated to Yvette Taffer (1924-2012), Jon Taffer's mother. New Name: Weber's Rum Bar & Grill (modernized version of old name)
18	8	"Owner Ousted"	Win, Place or Show	Fairfield, Ohio	September 16, 2012	206	1.29
A former Navy man who can't run his bar properly and lets his partner/musician run wild has Jon doing a serious tactic in an attempt to save the owner's bar. New Name: America Live Bar & BBQ
19	9	"On the Rocks"	Rocks	Laguna Niguel, California	September 23, 2012	202	1.33
Jon has some major hurdles to get over to rebuild a once popular bar, which fell from grace due to a recent change in laws, but has fierce resistance with regular customers who scare away women. New Name: Power Plant
20	10	"Bikini Bust"	Extremes	Orange, California	September 30, 2012	210	1.23
The owner's early success with the sports bar goes to his head and causes him to get drunk and disillusioned. The bartenders are required to work in tasteless bikinis, which fail to attract a crowd, and the staff are strongly divided between the senior and new bartenders fighting over tips. The bar also has significant hygiene problems. Taffer addresses the concerns the staff have over the owner's lack of interest, rebranded the bar as "Second Base" as a reference to its past, and provides baseball-inspired uniforms for the bar girls to replace their bikinis. Note: For the recon in this episode, Jon brought in the owner and general manager of Angel's Sports Bar (re-branded as Racks Billiards & Bourbon), featured in the series premiere. Extremes also appeared in season 4 and was originally going to be the first re-rescue but instead became Jon's second ever walkout when owner Terry refused to reinvest in his bar which caused the failure after the first rescue. New Name: Second Base
