= Adam Carmer =

American chef and writer

Adam Carmer (born April 3, 1966) is a Las Vegas-based entrepreneur, professor, and author. He is the original owner and creator of The Freakin' Frog and the founder and curator of The Whisky Attic. He is the author of the book The Method, and the inventor of CSTEM, the Carmer Spirits Tasting Enhancement Method, an alternate method for tasting spirits and wine.

== Personal life ==
Adam Carmer was born April 3, 1966, in Beverly Hills, CA, to Robert “Skippy” and Nina Carmer. He lived in Beverly Hills until moving to the San Fernando Valley in 1976. He married his wife Jill on Oct 12, 1991. They have three children together and live in Las Vegas, Nevada.

== Education ==
Adam Carmer started his education at The University of Southern California with a focus in philosophy, cinema, and communications. In 1996 he completed his Bachelor of Arts in Communications at The University of Nevada Las Vegas. In 2011 he completed his Masters of Science in Hotel Administration from the University of Nevada Las Vegas. He is currently attending The University of Liverpool where he is pursuing a Doctorate in Higher Education.

== Career ==
Carmer's first job in Las Vegas while completing his degree was as a maitre’d on the opening team at Treasure Island in 1993. In November 1996, he was inducted into the Chaine des Rotisseurs gourmet club. From 1997 to 2000, he worked as the Director of Restaurants and Hotel Sommelier for The Mirage Hotel & Casino in Las Vegas. It was during this time he became Steve Wynn's first hotel Sommelier. Carmer devised and demonstrated a new form of table service called "Apparition Service” at Café Michelle in August 2002. He has served as a professor for the UNLV Harrah's Hotel College since 1996 teaching courses in cost control, entrepreneurship, spirits, old world wine, new world wine and beer.

In June 2003, Carmer opened The Freakin' Frog, followed by The Whisky Attic in 2005. The bar was originally opened as a beer and wine café with ten beers on tap and 300 wines. Through customer feedback it evolved into the first craft beer bar in Nevada and the first whisky bar of its kind in the country. The Freakin' Frog offered over 1000 types of beer in bottles, with 15 taps that were constantly updated. As of late October 2013, The Freakin' Frog is officially on hiatus. The Whisky Attic was originally located upstairs from the Frog and stocked with over 900 whiskies from around the world. The Whisky Attic is still operational and moved to its current location in the city. Through his teaching and tasting experiences, he developed the Carmer Spirits Taste Enhancement Method, known as CSTEM or '"The Method". He appeared on Bar Rescue as a craft beer expert.
