= List of Bar Rescue episodes =

Bar Rescue is an American reality TV series that premiered on Paramount Network (formerly Spike) on July 17, 2011. It stars Jon Taffer (a long-time food and beverage industry consultant specializing in nightclubs and pubs), who offers his professional expertise, access to service industry experts, and renovations and equipment to desperately failing bars in order to save them from closing.

All renovations and improvements are paid for by sponsors, with no cost to the businesses. Additionally, the businesses featured on Bar Rescue are under no obligation to follow any of the rescue protocols or keep any of the changes. Throughout the show's history, multiple bars have restored their original name or motif after filming wraps. Episodes are shot in real-time for five-day stretches, however, considerable planning happens ahead of time.

A total of 289 episodes, including one removed episode (unintentionally aired), have aired as of June 29, 2025.

== Series overview ==
Season	Episodes	Originally released		
Season	Episodes	First released	Last released	Network
1	10	July 17, 2011	September 25, 2011	Spike
2	10	July 29, 2012	September 30, 2012	Spike
3	40	February 10, 2013	May 4, 2014	Spike
4	58	October 5, 2014	July 31, 2016	Spike
5	31	August 7, 2016	September 17, 2017	Spike
6	47	March 11, 2018	September 29, 2019	Paramount Network
7	16	March 1, 2020	September 13, 2020	Paramount Network
8	37	May 2, 2021	June 11, 2023	Paramount Network
9	40	February 25, 2024	June 29, 2025	Paramount Network
10	12	February 22, 2026	May 3, 2026	Paramount Network

== Episodes ==
=== Season 1 (2011) ===
No. overall	No. in season	Title	Bar name	Location	Original release date	Prod. code	Viewers (millions)
1	1	"Fallen Angels"	Angels Sports Bar	Corona, California	July 17, 2011	102	0.74
2	2	"Downey's and Out"	Downey's Irish Pub	Philadelphia, Pennsylvania	July 24, 2011	105	1.00
3	3	"Shabby Abbey"	The Abbey Pub	Chicago, Illinois	July 31, 2011	104	0.99
4	4	"Beach Bummer"	Kilkenny's Irish Pub	Redondo Beach, California	August 7, 2011	101	1.19
5	5	"Swanky Troubles"	Swanky Bubbles	Philadelphia, Pennsylvania	August 14, 2011	106	1.26
6	6	"The Blue Frog Sings The Blues"	The Blue Frog 22	Chicago, Illinois	August 21, 2011	103	1.06
7	7	"Bad To The Bone"	The Chicken Bone	Framingham, Massachusetts	August 28, 2011	109	1.05
8	8	"Chumps"	Champs Sports Pub	Burbank, California	September 11, 2011	107	1.31
9	9	"Bar Fight"	The Canyon Inn	Yorba Linda, California	September 18, 2011	108	1.04
10	10	"Hogtied Ham's"	Angry Ham's Garage	Framingham, Massachusetts	September 25, 2011	110	1.10

=== Season 2 (2012) ===
No. overall	No. in season	Title	Bar name	Location	Original release date	Prod. code	Viewers (millions)
11	1	"Yo-Ho-Ho and a Bottle of Dumb"	Piratz Tavern	Silver Spring, Maryland	July 29, 2012	203	1.20
12	2	"Tiki Curse"	The Bamboo Beach Tiki Bar	Fort Lauderdale, Florida	July 29, 2012	207	1.19
13	3	"Murphy's Mess"	J.A. Murphy's	Fell's Point, Maryland	August 5, 2012	204	1.17
14	4	"Mystique or Murder?"	Mystique Lounge	West Palm Beach, Florida	August 12, 2012	208	1.04
15	5	"Bottomless Pit"	The Olive Pit	Orange, California	August 19, 2012	201	1.19
16	6	"Broke Black Sheep"	The Black Sheep	Cheviot, Ohio	August 26, 2012	205	1.45
17	7	"Weber's of Lies"	Weber's Place	Reseda, California	September 9, 2012	209	1.32
18	8	"Owner Ousted"	Win, Place or Show	Fairfield, Ohio	September 16, 2012	206	1.29
19	9	"On the Rocks"	Rocks	Laguna Niguel, California	September 23, 2012	202	1.33
20	10	"Bikini Bust"	Extremes	Orange, California	September 30, 2012	210	1.23

=== Season 3 (2013–14) ===
No. overall	No. in season	Title	Bar name	Location	Original release date	Prod. code	Viewers (millions)
21	1	"Turtle on Its Back"	Turtle Bay	New Orleans, Louisiana	February 10, 2013	301	1.04
22	2	"Rock N Roaches"	Headhunters	Austin, Texas	February 17, 2013	303	1.46
23	3	"Bro's Got to Geaux!"	TJ Quills	New Orleans, Louisiana	February 24, 2013	302	1.28
24	4	"Tears for Beers"	The Brixton	Austin, Texas	March 3, 2013	304	1.10
25	5	"Empty Pockets"	Zanzbar	Denver, Colorado	March 10, 2013	305	1.55
26	6	"Jon T, He Don't Like It"	The Kasbah	Aurora, Colorado	March 17, 2013	306	1.37
27	7	"In a Pinch"	Lona's Wardlow Station	Long Beach, California	March 24, 2013	307	1.20
28	8	"Karaoke Katastrophe"	Dimples	Burbank, California	March 31, 2013	308	1.17
29	9	"A Horse Walks Into a Bar"	Kid Chilleen's Badass BBQ	Black Canyon City, Arizona	April 7, 2013	309	1.67
30	10	"Meat Sauna"	Stand Up, Scottsdale	Scottsdale, Arizona	April 14, 2013	310	1.10
31	11	"Don't Mess with Taffer's Wife"	Sand Dollar	Las Vegas, Nevada	July 7, 2013	311	1.75
32	12	"Don't Judge a Booze by Its Bottle"	Cashmere	Raleigh, North Carolina	July 14, 2013	316	1.52
33	13	"Two Flew Over the Handlebars"	Handlebar Cafe	Pawcatuck, Connecticut	July 21, 2013	319	1.55
34	14	"There's No Crying in the Bar Business"	Barlow's	Tucker, Georgia	July 28, 2013	314	1.48
35	15	"Play. Some. Janet. Jackson!"	Gipsy	Las Vegas, Nevada	August 4, 2013	312	1.52
36	16	"Characters Assassination"	Characters Quarters	Garner, North Carolina	August 11, 2013	315	1.35
37	17	"Corking the Hole"	Cliques	Hope Mills, North Carolina	August 18, 2013	317	1.43
38	18	"A Bar Full of Bull"	Libad's Bar & Grill	New Bedford, Massachusetts	August 25, 2013	318	1.51
39	19	"Beer and Loathing in Las Vegas"	The Hammer	Las Vegas, Nevada	September 8, 2013	313	1.30
40	20	"Barely Above Water"	Marley's on the Beach	Warwick, Rhode Island	September 15, 2013	320	1.27
41	21	"Crappy Cantina"	Rocky Point Cantina	Tempe, Arizona	October 6, 2013	321	1.12
42	22	"Jon of the Dead"	The Underworld Grill & Bar	Las Vegas, Nevada	October 13, 2013	322	1.19
43	23	"Grandpa Got Run Over by His Grandkids"	Kerry's Sports Pub	Las Vegas, Nevada	October 20, 2013	323	1.37
44	24	"Hurricane Jon vs. Hurricane Sandy"	Bungalow Bar	Rockaway, New York	October 27, 2013	999	1.04
45	25	"Drunk & Dirty Dolls" (Note: "Attack of the Yummy Mommies" was the original title for this episode.)	The Alibi	Las Vegas, Nevada	November 3, 2013	324	1.21
46	26	"Empty Bottles Full Cans"	MT Bottle	Murfreesboro, Tennessee	November 10, 2013	325	1.02
47	27	"Hole in None"	Fairways Golf & Grill	Murfreesboro, Tennessee	November 17, 2013	326	1.36
48	28	"Music City Mess"	BoondoxXx BBQ & Juke Joint	Nashville, Tennessee	November 25, 2013	327	N/A
49	29	"Brawlin' Babes"	Long Shots Sports Bar	Grain Valley, Missouri	December 8, 2013	328	1.30
50	30	"Twin vs. Twin"	R.G.'s Lounge	Independence, Missouri	December 15, 2013	330	1.61
51	31	"Hostile Takeover"	O'Banion's Bar & Grill	Bellevue, Nebraska	March 9, 2014	331	1.35
52	32	"Critters and Quitters"	KC's Bar & Grill	Shawnee, Kansas	March 16, 2014	329	1.50
53	33	"Punch-Drunk & Trailer-Trashed"	O'Face Bar	Council Bluffs, Iowa	March 23, 2014	333	1.65
54	34	"Scoreboard to Death"	Scoreboard	Norwalk, California	March 30, 2014	336	1.45
55	35	"Grow Some Meatballs!!"	The Tailgate	Santa Clarita, California	April 6, 2014	334	1.34
56	36	"Taxed Out in Texas"	Bryant's Ice House	Katy, Texas	April 13, 2014	337	1.47
57	37	"When Life Doesn't Hand You Lemons"	Pat's Cocktails	Valley Village, California	April 20, 2014	335	1.62
58	38	"I Smell A Rat"	Oasis Hookah Bar	Omaha, Nebraska	April 27, 2014	332	1.90
59	39	"Scary Mary's"	Mary's Outpost	Grand Prairie, Texas	May 4, 2014	339	1.76
60	40	"Muscle Madness"	The End Zone Sports Bar and Grill	Houston, Texas	May 11, 2014	338	1.62

=== Season 4 (2014–16) ===
No. overall	No. in season	Title	Bar name	Location	Original release date	Prod. code	Viewers (millions)
61	1	"Bug Bite"	Artful Dodger	Huntington, New York	October 5, 2014 (Note: This episode premiered on the Spike app as a sneak preview before its actual airing.)	340	1.03
62	2	"Thugs with Mugs"	Undisputed Sports Bar & Grill	Yonkers, New York	October 12, 2014	401	1.17
63	3	"Schmuck Dynasty"	Rhythm & Brews	Staten Island, New York	October 19, 2014	402	1.21
64	4	"El Moronte!!"	Laguna Lounge	Jersey City, New Jersey	October 26, 2014	403	1.27
65	5	"Anything You Can Yell, I Can Yell Louder"	Jack's Ale House	Sunnyside, New York	November 2, 2014	404	1.32
66	6	"To Protect and to (Over) Serve"	Lickety Split	Philadelphia, Pennsylvania	November 9, 2014	405	1.06
67	7	"A Dash of Bitters"	Plush	Glenside, Pennsylvania	November 16, 2014	406	1.19
68	8	"Swinging from the Rafters"	Dirty Rooster	Antioch, Illinois	November 23, 2014	407	0.96
69	9	"Spoiled Brat Party"	Y-Not III	Milwaukee, Wisconsin	December 7, 2014	408	1.02
70	10	"Irish Eyes Aren't Smiling"	Packy's Pub	Milwaukee, Wisconsin	December 14, 2014	409	1.03
71	11	"Second Base, Third Strike"	Second Base	Orange, California	February 8, 2015 (Note: This episode premiered online, on the Spike app and on-demand prior to its airing.)	417	0.87
72	12	"Crayons & Anger Lines"	Underground Wonder Bar	Chicago, Illinois	February 15, 2015	411	1.14
73	13	"Beach Rats"	Toucans Oceanside Bar & Grill	Hollywood, Florida	February 22, 2015	412	1.20
74	14	"All Twerk & No Pay"	Heat Restaurant & Lounge	Hollywood, Florida	March 1, 2015	413	1.22
75	15	"Bromancing the Stone"	Sandbar Sports Grill	Coconut Grove, Florida	March 8, 2015	414	1.11
76	16	"Storming the Castle"	Friar Tucks	Pomona, California	March 15, 2015	415	1.16
77	17	"Lagers and Liars"	The Los Angeles Brewing Company	Los Angeles, California	March 22, 2015	416	1.34
78	18	"Loose Lips Loose Tips"	The Holding Company	San Francisco, California	March 29, 2015	419	0.98
79	19	"Back to the Bar: Hot-Headed Owners"	N/A	N/A	April 5, 2015	993	1.05
80	20	"Mandala Down"	Mandala Lounge	San Mateo, California	April 12, 2015	418	1.18
81	21	"Sticky Situation"	Park 77	San Francisco, California	June 21, 2015 (Note: This episode debuted on Amazon Prime, the Spike app and on-demand prior to its airing.)	420	1.08
82	22	"Take Me Out to the Bar Game"	The Bullpen Bar	Sparks, Nevada	June 28, 2015	421	1.40
83	23	"Emergency Exit"	Murphy's Law Irish Pub	Reno, Nevada	July 5, 2015	422	1.26
84	24	"It's Always Sunny in Portland"	Six Point Inn	Portland, Oregon	July 12, 2015	425	1.20
85	25	"Brokedown Palace"	The Palace	Upland, California	July 19, 2015	423	1.21
86	26	"Ants with Wings, Bro!"	Tonic Lounge	Portland, Oregon	July 26, 2015	424	1.08
87	27	"Back to the Bar: Stubborn Owners"	N/A	N/A	August 2, 2015	991	1.22
88	28	"Put a Cork in It"	Brix Wine Bar	Sunset Beach, California	August 9, 2015	430	1.10
89	29	"Too Many Managers, Not Enough Man"	Pro's Sports Bar	Country Club Hills, Illinois	August 16, 2015	410	1.04
90	30	"Jon Ain't Afraid of No Ghost"	Myerz PourHouse	El Cajon, California	August 23, 2015	427	1.08
91	31	"Back to the Bar: Delusional Owners"	N/A	N/A	August 30, 2015	992	1.14
92	32	"Til Debt Do Us Part"	Caribe Night Club	San Diego, California	October 4, 2015	429	0.81
93	33	"Shamrocks and Shenanigans"	Molly Malone's	Ramona, California	October 11, 2015	426	0.73
94	34	"Blowing Royal Smoke"	Royal Oaks	Youngstown, Ohio	October 18, 2015	431	0.89
95	35	"Sour Lemons and Bitter Business"	Martini Brothers Burger Bar	Youngstown, Ohio	October 25, 2015	432	0.85
96	36	"Ripper's Rookie House"	Ripper's Rock House	Akron, Ohio	November 1, 2015	433	0.71
97	37	"Big Sister's Watching"	Filling Station Pub	San Diego, California	November 8, 2015	428	0.86
98	38	"Vulgar Vixens"	The Hooch	Dearborn Heights, Michigan	November 15, 2015	434	1.04
99	39	"Unnecessary Toughness"	The Arena	Ann Arbor, Michigan	November 22, 2015	435	0.86
100	40	"Boss Lady Blues"	Jazz Katz	Southfield, Michigan	December 6, 2015	436	0.82
101	41	"Bare Rescue"	Chix on Dix	Detroit, Michigan	December 13, 2015	437	1.03
102	42	"Back to the Bar: No Laughing Matter"	N/A	N/A	December 20, 2015	260	0.85
103	43	"Hard Heads and Softballs"	Mac & Chester's SRO	Anoka, Minnesota	March 6, 2016	438	0.89
104	44	"Dragon Lady"	Van Goghz	St. Louis Missouri	March 13, 2016	441	1.10
105	45	"Paradise Lost"	Dale 1891	Tampa, Florida	March 20, 2016	444	0.96
106	46	"Back to the Bar: Meathead-to-Head"	N/A	N/A	March 27, 2016	261	0.88
107	47	"Land of the Beer and Home of the Misbehaved"	O’Kelleys Irish Pub	St. Louis, Missouri	April 3, 2016	442	0.99
108	48	"Getting Freaki at the Tiki"	Freaki Tiki	Clearwater, Florida	April 10, 2016	446	1.18
109	49	"Back to the Bar: Empty Pockets"	N/A	N/A	April 17, 2016	262	0.86
110	50	"How to Train the Dragon"	George & Dragon	Phoenix, Arizona	April 24, 2016	448	0.85
111	51	"Demolition Man"	Grinders	Santa Clarita, California	May 1, 2016	440	1.07
112	52	"Back to the Bar: The Luck of the Irish"	N/A	N/A	May 8, 2016	263	0.63
113	53	"We're Gonna Need a Bigger Boat"	The Bridge Lounge	Tarpon Springs, Florida	May 15, 2016	445	1.07
114	54	"Danny Sits on His Fanny"	Cirivello's Bar	Long Beach, California	May 22, 2016	449	0.89
115	55	"Gone in a Flash"	City Bistro	St. Louis, Missouri	July 10, 2016	443	0.99
116	56	"Momster's Ball" (Note: Breastaurant Rescue was the episode's original title.)	Baseline Sports Bar	Tempe, Arizona	July 17, 2016	447	0.92
117	57	"Drunk on Punk"	Black Light District Rock & Roll Lounge	Long Beach, California	July 24, 2016	450	1.07
118	58	"Raising Arizona"	The Gallopin' Goose	Coolidge, Arizona	July 31, 2016	439	1.03

=== Season 5 (2016–17) ===
No. overall	No. in season	Title	Bar name	Location	Original release date	Prod. code	Viewers (millions)
119	1	"The Perks of Being a Wallpaper"	Champagne's Cafe	Las Vegas, Nevada	August 7, 2016	502	0.90
120	2	"Wheels of Misfortune"	The Wheel House Bar	Hemet, California	August 14, 2016	504	1.01
121	3	"12 Beers a Slave/Whipped Into Shape"	City Bar	Las Vegas, Nevada	August 21, 2016	501	1.01
122	4	"Antisocial Media"	Celebrities Sports Grill	Yucaipa, California	September 18, 2016	503	0.78
123	5	"How to Train Your Goldfish"	YNot Sports Pub & Grub	Everett, Washington	September 25, 2016	506	0.68
124	6	"Win, Lose or Brawl"	Russell City Grill & Sports Bar	Hayward, California	October 2, 2016	508	0.76
125	7	"Listen Y'all It's Sabotage"	Schafer's Bar & Grill	Sumner, Washington	October 9, 2016	505	0.59
126	8	"Gettin' Jigger With It"	Sam Jordan's Bar	San Francisco, California	October 16, 2016	509	0.69
127	9	"Chase Lounge"	The Tradewinds	Cotati, California	October 23, 2016	507	0.74
128	10	"Zero Drunk Thirty"	Brickhouse Bar & Grill	Colorado Springs, Colorado	October 30, 2016	511	0.64
129	11	"Ice, Mice, Baby"	Fort One Bar & Lounge	San Francisco, California	November 6, 2016	510	0.69
130	12	"Punk as a Drunk"	Triple Nickel Tavern	Colorado Springs, Colorado	November 13, 2016	512	0.64
131	13	"Back to the Bar: Drunky McDrunkerton Returns"	N/A	N/A	November 20, 2016	264	0.59
132	14	"Don't Tell Mom the Bar is Dead"	St8 Pub	Englewood, Colorado	February 19, 2017	513	0.75
133	15	"I Know What You Did Last Summit"	Summit House Grill And Tap	Lakewood, Colorado	February 26, 2017	514	0.78
134	16	"Struck Out at the Dugout"	The Dugout	Chicago, Illinois	March 5, 2017	516	0.81
135	17	"Back to the Bar: Brick & Barley Above Water"	N/A	N/A	March 12, 2017	365	0.72
136	18	"All Twerk and No Pay Makes Taffer Shut It Down"	Speakeasy Bar & Grill	Kenner, Louisiana	March 19, 2017	519	0.79
137	19	"Bar Over Troubled Water"	Big Mike's Sports Bar & Grill	Denham Springs, Louisiana	March 26, 2017	520	0.95
138	20	"Desi, You Got Some 'Splainin' To Do"	Desi Romano's Sports Bar & Grill	Chalmette, Louisiana	April 2, 2017	518	0.74
139	21	"Back to the Bar: Hallelujah for Jon"	N/A	N/A	April 9, 2017	362	0.54
140	22	"Casually Tapped Out"	Casual Tap	Chicago, Illinois	July 2, 2017	515	0.59
141	23	"Things That Go Pahrump in the Night"	Paddy's Pub	Pahrump, Nevada	July 16, 2017	521	0.76
142	24	"Mother Doesn't Know Best"	Jack's Place	Las Vegas, Nevada	July 23, 2017	524	0.61
143	25	"Back to the Bar: Flying Fists and Bar Brawls"	N/A	N/A	July 30, 2017	366	0.59
144	26	"Silence of the Ants"	Liquid Lounge	Long Beach, California	August 6, 2017	525	0.64
145	27	"Daddy Dearest"	Sidelines Sports Grill & Bar	Mount Dora, Florida	August 13, 2017	532	0.73
146	28	"Rickety Rockin' Rhonda's"	Rockin' Rhonda's	Sanford, Florida	August 20, 2017	534	0.67
147	29	"Back to the Bar: For Whom the Cajun Belle Tolls"	N/A	N/A	September 3, 2017	364	0.54
148	30	"The Unlucky Leprechaun"	Lucky Leprechaun	Davenport, Florida	September 10, 2017	531	0.55
149	31	"Back to the Bar: Disasters of Epic Proportions"	N/A	N/A	September 17, 2017	363	0.42

=== Season 6 (2018–19) ===
No. overall	No. in season	Title	Bar name	Location	Original release date	Prod. code	Viewers (millions)
150	1	"Put It on Cody's Tab"	Game Time Sports Grille	Arlington, Tennessee	March 11, 2018	601	0.77
151	2	"Close, But No Cigar"	Havana Mix Cigar	Memphis, Tennessee	March 18, 2018	602	0.63
152	3	"Weird Science"	Paladino's	Tarzana, California	March 25, 2018	530	0.61
153	4	"Ground Control to Major Jon"	King's Duck Inn	Merritt Island, Florida	April 1, 2018	528	0.62
154	5	"Mississippi Rears"	Joe's Thirsty Lizard Bar & Grill	Horn Lake, Mississippi	April 8, 2018	603	0.59
155	6	"Back to the Bar: Don't Call it a Comeback"	N/A	N/A	April 15, 2018	368	0.55
156	7	"Pole Without a Purpose"	Club Platinum	Las Vegas, Nevada	April 22, 2018	523	0.78
157	8	"An Ode to the Cap'n"	Cap'n Odie's Lounge	Atlantic Beach, Florida	April 29, 2018	610	0.77
158	9	"Crazy Little Thing Called Selman"	Copper Rocket Pub	Maitland, Florida	May 6, 2018	533	0.78
159	10	"Caving In"	The Cave Sports Bar	Anaheim, California	May 13, 2018	529	0.67
160	11	"Back to the Bar: Blue in the Frog Face"	N/A	N/A	May 20, 2018	367	0.53
161	12	"Down and Out in Las Vegas"	Barley Pop's Bar & Grill	Las Vegas, Nevada	June 3, 2018	522	0.94
162	13	"Back to the Bar: The Power of Bacon and Beer"	N/A	N/A	June 10, 2018	370	0.58
163	14	"Father Knows Best"	No Name Saloon	Edgewater, Florida	June 17, 2018	535	0.76
164	15	"Phishing for Answers"	Phish Heads	Lake City, Florida	June 24, 2018	607	0.84
165	16	"Not Cleared for Takeoff"	The Airliner	Lincoln Heights, Los Angeles, California	July 1, 2018	526	0.79
166	17	"Back to the Bar: Tough Love"	N/A	N/A	July 8, 2018	361	0.52
167	18	"Fish Out of Blue Water"	Blue Water	Jacksonville Beach, Florida	July 15, 2018	609	0.79
168	19	"Operation: Puerto Rico"	El K'rajo, Centro Comunal Piñones-Loíza and Bienvenidos A Loíza	Loíza, Puerto Rico	July 22, 2018	606	0.82
169	20	"Life, Liberty, and the Pursuit of Fatballs"	Fatballs	Jacksonville, Florida	July 29, 2018	608	0.67
170	21	"The Unwanted Saloon"	The Wanted Saloon	Dickson, Tennessee	August 5, 2018	604	0.83
171	22	"Back to the Bar: The Tradewinds of Change"	N/A	N/A	August 12, 2018	369	0.56
172	23	"Star Lite, Star Not So Brite"	Britestar Tavern	Glendora, California	August 19, 2018	527	0.78
173	24	"There Will Be Family Blood"	Island Bar & Grill	Blue Island, Illinois	August 26, 2018	517	0.71
174	25	"The Lights Came Back in Puerto Rico"	Shibō	San Juan, Puerto Rico	March 3, 2019	614	0.48
175	26	"Dalia's Inferno"	Country Nights	San Antonio, Texas	March 10, 2019	619	0.48
176	27	"Don't Cry for Me Jon Taffer"	RJ's Replay	Tucson, Arizona	March 17, 2019	615	0.67
177	28	"Owner on the Run"	The Original Hideout	Tucson, Arizona	March 24, 2019	616	0.60
178	29	"Twerking 9 to 5"	Crossroads Grille	Antioch, Tennessee	March 31, 2019	605	0.70
179	30	"Back to School"	UNLV College of Hospitality	Las Vegas, Nevada	April 7, 2019	613	0.53
180	31	"Tanked and Toasty"	The Recovery Room Bar	San Antonio, Texas	April 14, 2019	620	0.57
181	32	"Miles from Success"	Kiva Lounge and Bar	San Marcos, Texas	April 21, 2019	618	0.58
182	33	"Un-Civil War"	Eliphino	Las Vegas, Nevada	April 28, 2019	612	0.64
183	34	"LIV'n on a Prayer"	LIV Bar and Restaurant	Las Vegas, Nevada	May 5, 2019	611	0.62
184	35	"Big Trouble in Little China Grove"	The China Grove Trading Post	China Grove, Texas	May 12, 2019	617	0.67
185	36	"Pie Hard"	Gil & Rick's Sports Bar and Pizzeria	Largo, Florida	May 19, 2019	621	0.67
186	37	"Driving Miss Tara"	New England's Ale House Grille	Palm Harbor, Florida	June 2, 2019	623	0.59
187	38	"All Blaze, No Glory"	Thunderbolt Bar & Grill	Pleasant Valley, Missouri	July 14, 2019	628	0.59
188	39	"Reckless Roundhouse"	Whiskey Girl Saloon	Fort Worth, Texas	July 21, 2019	624	0.67
189	40	"John and Bert Bought a Bar"	Harbor Point Club & Grill	Richardson, Texas	July 28, 2019	626	0.59
190	41	"Green Walls and Donkey Balls"	Drunken Donkey Bar & Grill	Lewisville, Texas	August 4, 2019	625	0.76
191	42	"Doreen's Dilemma"	Buffalo City Bar & Grille	St Petersburg, Florida	August 11, 2019	622	0.64
192	43	"Stix and Stones May Break Your Bar"	Stix & Stones Bar and Grill	Sugar Creek, Missouri	August 25, 2019	627	0.57
193	44	"So We Meet Again, Mr. Taffer"	Edge of Town	Blue Springs, Missouri	September 8, 2019	629	0.57
194	45	"The Sound of Falling Music"	Wildfire Bistro	Aurora, Colorado	September 15, 2019	631	0.50
195	46	"Saving GI Jodi"	G.I. Jodi's Bar and Grill	Littleton, Colorado	September 22, 2019	630	0.51
196	47	"Get Off Your Ass!"	The Fifth	Bountiful, Utah	September 29, 2019	632	0.45

=== Season 7 (2020) ===
No. overall	No. in season	Title	Bar name	Location	Original release date	Prod. code	Viewers (millions)
197	1	"Sactown Going Down"	SacTown Sports Bar & Grill	Sacramento, California	March 1, 2020	710	0.61
198	2	"Gutterball!"	Lucky 66 Bowl	Albuquerque, New Mexico	March 8, 2020	705	0.62
199	3	"Breaking Brandon"	Linda Lou's Time For Two	Layton, Utah	March 15, 2020	702	0.58
200	4	"Still Bill"	The Union	Midvale, Utah	March 22, 2020	703	0.57
201	5	"Saving Post 6216"	VFW Post 6216	Albuquerque, New Mexico	March 29, 2020	706	0.57
202	6	"Life's a Beach"	The Sandbar Brewery & Grill	Albuquerque, New Mexico	April 5, 2020	704	0.62
203	7	"Taken for Granted"	The Grant Bar & Lounge	Tracy, California	April 12, 2020	707	0.65
204	8	"Come Home to Roost"	The Broadway Club	Tooele, Utah	April 19, 2020	701	0.61
205	9	"Beast Rescue"	Rob Ben's Restaurant & Lounge	Emeryville, California	April 26, 2020	709	0.74
206	10	"Raging Turkey"	Kalaveraz Cocina-Cantina	Escondido, California	May 3, 2020	712	0.64
207	11	"In the Rough"	Pepe's Mexican Restaurant & Cantina	Canyon Lake, California	May 17, 2020	713	0.56
208	12	"Bottoms Up, Going Down"	Bottoms Up Bar & Grill	Stanton, California	May 31, 2020	715	0.56
209	13	"A Silver Dollar Saved Is a Silver Dollar Earned"	Silver Dollar	Chula Vista, California	June 7, 2020	711	0.51
210	14	"Fear and Molding on Pineapple Hill"	Pineapple Hill Grill	Tustin, California	June 14, 2020	714	0.57
211	15	"The Gaslamp Redemption"	Jolt'n Joe's	San Diego, California	September 6, 2020	708	0.46
212	16	"The Mother of All Failures"	Armadillo Grill	Phoenix, Arizona	September 13, 2020	716	0.46

=== Season 8 (2021–23) ===
No. overall	No. in season	Title	Bar name	Location	Original release date	Prod. code	Viewers (millions)
213	1	"Two Tickets to Paradise Cantina"	Paradise Cantina	Las Vegas, Nevada	May 2, 2021	802	0.56
214	2	"Not Your Godfather's Speakeasy"	Capo's Italian Cuisine	Las Vegas, Nevada	May 9, 2021	801	0.60
215	3	"A Twice in a Lifetime Opportunity"	Champagne's Cafe	Las Vegas, Nevada	May 23, 2021	804	0.51
216	4	"Every Rose Has Its Thorn"	Cork and Thorn	Las Vegas, Nevada	June 6, 2021	803	0.44
217	5	"Viva La Casona"	La Casona Bar and Grill	Las Vegas, Nevada	June 13, 2021	806	0.55
218	6	"Rookie of the Beer"	Nevada Brew Works	Las Vegas, Nevada	June 20, 2021	805	0.46
219	7	"A Bar to Take Pride In"	Badlands	Las Vegas, Nevada	June 27, 2021	807	0.41
220	8	"A Commander & His Post"	VFW Post 10054	Pahrump, Nevada	July 11, 2021	808	0.58
221	9	"Behind the 8 Ball"	Griff's	Las Vegas, Nevada	July 18, 2021	809	0.48
222	10	"Ninja Karaoke's Swan Song"	Ninja Karaoke	Las Vegas, Nevada	August 1, 2021	810	0.46
223	11	"Remembering Billy"	The County Line Lounge & Grille	Tucson, Arizona	August 8, 2021	811	0.56
224	12	"Wreck It Ralph"	True Grit Tavern	Maricopa, Arizona	August 15, 2021	812	0.53
225	13	"Penalty on the Bar"	Gilly's Sports Bar	Dunwoody, Georgia	March 20, 2022	817	0.56
226	14	"Ace's Wild"	Ace's Sports Hangar	The Colony, Texas	March 27, 2022	813	0.49
227	15	"Personal Assistant, Professional Failure"	The Brick Tavern	Sachse, Texas	April 3, 2022	814	0.54
228	16	"Doing it for Dad"	G Willicker's	Arlington, Texas	April 10, 2022	815	0.57
229	17	"Shutting Down the Confetti Party"	Confetti's Bar & Grill	Norcross, Georgia	April 17, 2022	816	0.34
230	18	"Sandtown Rescue"	SandTown Pub	Atlanta, Georgia	April 24, 2022	818	0.41
231	19	"Working to Death"	JF Kicks	Valrico, Florida	May 8, 2022	819	0.40
232	20	"Magically Atrocious"	Cerealholic Cafe & Bar	Ybor City, Florida	May 15, 2022	820	0.45
233	21	"Rescue on the River"	AJ’s on the River	Gibsonton, Florida	May 22, 2022	821	0.49
234	22	"Till Failure Do You Part"	The Forge	Brandon, Florida	May 29, 2022	822	0.40
235	23	"Game Over"	Throwbacks	Sanford, Florida	June 12, 2022	823	0.38
236	24	"JJ's Sports Bust"	JJ's Sports Bar & Grill	Highland, California	February 26, 2023	825	0.41
237	25	"Outta Touch, Outta Time"	Rockabillies	Arvada, Colorado	March 5, 2023	831	0.36
238	26	"Hideaway From Reality"	Hideaway Bar & Grill	Meridian, Idaho	March 12, 2023	837	0.35
239	27	"The Napoleon Complex"	360 Lounge Reloaded	Charlotte, North Carolina	March 19, 2023	827	0.39
240	28	"Pool House Rock"	Colorado Cork & Keg	Castle Rock, Colorado	March 26, 2023	829	0.37
241	29	"Loveless in Loveland"	Blue Sports Grille	Loveland, Colorado	April 2, 2023	833	0.35
242	30	"Fresh Bread, Rotten Bar"	CJ's Patio Grill	Loveland, Colorado	April 9, 2023	832	0.39
243	31	"3rd Pocket's a Charm"	Corner Pocket II	Hickory, North Carolina	April 23, 2023	828	0.33
244	32	"Long Live a Legacy"	Papa Joe's Sports Bar	Moreno Valley, California	April 30, 2023	824	0.42
245	33	"Horseshoe Bend It Like Bar Rescue"	Corner Cafe Bar & Grill	Horseshoe Bend, Idaho	May 14, 2023	835	0.40
246	34	"Spare Me Another Chance"	Strikers	Meridian, Idaho	May 21, 2023	836	0.29
247	35	"Changing of the Guards"	VFW Post 9644	Sheridan, Colorado	May 28, 2023	830	0.44
248	36	"Put This Fire Out"	Firehouse Sports Pub	Nampa, Idaho	June 4, 2023	834	0.38
249	37	"How The Cookie Crumbles"	Latitudes Bar and Grill	Denver, North Carolina	June 11, 2023	826	0.40

=== Season 9 (2024–25) ===
No. overall	No. in season	Title	Bar name	Location	Guest host	Original release date	Prod. code	Viewers (millions)
250	1	"Deadliest Kitchen"	Skip & Jan's Sports Bar	Gilbert, Arizona	N/A	February 25, 2024	906	0.24
251	2	"Wildkats Wild Collapse"	Wildkat Records Bar & Grill	Jacksonville, Florida	N/A	March 3, 2024	911	0.34
252	3	"Jason's Last Call"	Hogwash Saloon	Fountain Hills, Arizona	N/A	March 3, 2024	909	0.35
253	4	"A Drunk, a Fruitfly, and a KnightWalk Into a Bar"	The Thirsty Ox	Oxnard, California	Phil Wills	March 17, 2024	904	0.28
254	5	"Low Five Dive"	High 5 Grille	Tucson, Arizona	N/A	March 24, 2024	910	0.40
255	6	"Missing the Marc"	Arnold's	St. Augustine, Florida	Ashish Alfred	March 31, 2024	913	0.37
256	7	"My Brother's Barkeeper"	Finesse Lounge	Banning, California	N/A	April 7, 2024	902	0.25
257	8	"A Perla in the Rough"	La Perla Sports Cantina	Glendale, Arizona	Dustin Drai	April 14, 2024	907	0.24
258	9	"Losing the Playoffs"	Playoffs Sports Lounge	Palm Desert, California	N/A	April 21, 2024	901	0.32
259	10	"Friends Without Benefits"	Epic Lounge	Downey, California	Phil Wills	April 28, 2024	905	0.29
260	11	"Boca Re-Tune"	One11 Boca Raton	Boca Raton, Florida	N/A	May 5, 2024	917	0.31
261	12	"CSI: Los Cocos"	Los Cocos	Port St. Lucie, Florida	Ashish Alfred	May 12, 2024	916	0.26
262	13	"From Camo to Cocktail"	VFW Post 1689	Jacksonville, Florida	N/A	May 19, 2024	912	0.30
263	14	"Thank You for (Not) Smoking"	Gerri’s Sports Pub	Margate, Florida	N/A	June 2, 2024	919	0.35
264	15	"Inland Tavern, Underwater"	Inland Tavern	San Marcos, California	Phil Wills	June 9, 2024	903	0.34
265	16	"Dancing Dreams Dashed"	Cielo Lounge	Port St. Lucie, Florida	N/A	June 16, 2024	915	0.42
266	17	"Mis-Steaks Were Made"	Tumbleweed Grill & Bar	Apache Junction, Arizona	Dustin Drai	June 23, 2024	908	0.36
267	18	"Feels Bad at Philgoods"	Dr. Philgoods Sports Bar	Pompano Beach, Florida	N/A	June 30, 2024	918	0.29
268	19	"Long Island Mess"	Uncle Albert's Pub	Houston, Texas	Danny Trejo & Phil Wills	July 14, 2024	924	0.28
269	20	"Lost in the Sauce"	Nico's	Kingwood, Texas	N/A	July 21, 2024	920	N/A
270	21	"Till the Wagon Wheels Fall Off"	The Wagon Wheel	Cleveland, Texas	Danny Trejo & Phil Wills	July 28, 2024	923	0.26
271	22	"Midtown Slump"	Coaches Pub	Houston, Texas	N/A	August 4, 2024	921	0.24
272	23	"Jimmy Meet World"	Interlude II: Bar & Grill	Kenosha, Wisconsin	N/A	February 23, 2025	936	0.29
273	24	"Lights Out in the Harbor"	Harbor Lights	Sheboygan, Wisconsin	Spike Mendelsohn	March 2, 2025	938	0.29
274	25	"Rock Bottom at Top Shelf"	Top Shelf Sports Bar & Grille	Fond du Lac, Wisconsin	Donnie Wahlberg	March 9, 2025	939	0.33
275	26	"Pete's Ruined Tavern"	Pete's Cutting Board Reuben Tavern & Grill	Chesterfield, Michigan	Jason Santos	March 16, 2025	926	0.25
276	27	"I'm a F'n Bar Guy! I'm a F'n Bar Girl!"	Daq Shack	Milwaukee, Wisconsin	N/A	March 23, 2025	937	0.24
277	28	"Backroads to Ruin"	Backroads Bar & Grill	Holly, Michigan	Phil Wills	March 30, 2025	927	0.23
278	29	"Oh Brother, Where Art Thou?"	Brothers on Main	St. Clair, Missouri	Jason Santos	April 6, 2025	932	0.28
279	30	"Honey, I Bought a Bar!"	Bar 8	Houston, Texas	N/A	April 13, 2025	922	0.25
280	31	"The Airliner is Grounded"	The Airliner Bar & Grill	East Alton, Illinois	Spike Mendelsohn	April 20, 2025	934	0.23
281	32	"Calendar's Crisis"	Calendar's Pizzeria	Macclenny, Florida	Danny Trejo	April 27, 2025	914	0.29
282	33	"On the 3:10 to Failure"	CJ's Pub & Grill	Smithton, Illinois	N/A	May 4, 2025	931	0.19
283	34	"Out of the Frying Pan, Into the Fireplace"	The Fireplace	St. Louis, Missouri	Spike Mendelsohn	May 11, 2025	935	0.23
284	35	"Bad Times at Goodtime"	Jon's Goodtime Bar & Grill	Inkster, Michigan	Phil Wills	May 18, 2025	925	0.25
285	36	"Tropical Storm"	Tropic	Milwaukee, Wisconsin	N/A	June 1, 2025	940	0.20
286	37	"Murky Waters at Swamp Tales"	Swamp Tales Bar & Restaurant	Carlyle, Illinois	Jason Santos	June 8, 2025	933	0.30
287	38	"The World Famous Raw Chicken Wings"	Pat & Dandy's Sports Bar & Grill	Toledo, Ohio	Phil Wills	June 15, 2025	929	0.25
288	39	"Third Time's the Charm"	Club 21	Goodells, Michigan	Dustin Drai	June 22, 2025	928	N/A
289	40	"Slotzy's Last Shotzy"	Slotzy's Gaming Bar & Grill	Worden, Illinois	N/A	June 29, 2025	930	0.18

=== Season 10 (2026) ===
No. overall	No. in season	Title	Bar name	Location	Guest host	Original release date	Prod. code	Viewers (millions)
290	1	"Sitting Down on the Job"	Main Street Hideaway	Ashland City, Tennessee	N/A	February 22, 2026	1010	0.24
291	2	"One Man Brand"	Bar 44	Marietta, Georgia	N/A	February 22, 2026	1006	0.24
292	3	"When Dreams Hit the Sidewalk"	Game Room & Social Club	Orlando, Florida	N/A	March 1, 2026	1003	0.22
293	4	"Alley Cat-astrophe"	Alley Cat Dive Bar	Bowling Green, Kentucky	N/A	March 8, 2026	1012	0.31
294	5	"A Palette of Problems"	The Blu Rose Art Bistro	Douglasville, Georgia	N/A	March 15, 2026	1007	0.26
295	6	"Don't Leave it to Happenchance"	Happenchance Social Lounge	Nolensville, Tennessee	N/A	March 22, 2026	1011	0.20
296	7	"Flush the Slush"	Hurricane Creek Saloon	Melbourne, Florida	N/A	March 29, 2026	1004	0.19
297	8	"Crust Issues"	Urban Pie	Atlanta, Georgia	N/A	April 5, 2026	1005	0.21
298	9	"615 Reasons to Fail"	615 District	Murfreesboro, Tennessee	N/A	April 12, 2026	1009	0.26
299	10	"Broken Chains of Command"	VFW Post 8093	DeBary, Florida	N/A	April 19, 2026	1002	N/A
300	11	"Hair of the Big Dog"	Big Dog Saloon	Mt. Dora, Florida	N/A	April 26, 2026	1001	N/A
301	12	"Havana Rough Time"	Havana Haven Lounge	Powder Springs, Georgia	N/A	May 3, 2026	1008	N/A

== Specials ==
Title	Bar name	Location	Original air date	Prod. code	Viewers (in millions)
"The Lost Episode"	South Park Bar & Grill	Montclair, New Jersey	June 1, 2014	998	1.75
Jon tries to save a New Jersey bar whose owner's short temper leads him to fight with customers and drive business away. Note: This episode, filmed in 2010, originally served as the pilot prior to the show's premiere one year later. New Name: V Bar (Note: South Park Bar & Grill changed their new name to Park Sports Bar.) (Note: This bar has closed.)
"Taffer's Top 10: Most Disgusting Bars"	N/A	N/A	June 22, 2014	994	0.94
Jon counts down the ten most disgusting bars he's rescued during the first three seasons of Bar Rescue.
"Taffer's Top 10: Worst Owners"	N/A	N/A	June 22, 2014	995	0.96
Jon counts down the ten worst owners he's encountered during the first three seasons of Bar Rescue.
"Taffer's Top 10: Angriest Moments"	N/A	N/A	June 29, 2014	997	0.75
Jon counts down the ten angriest moments he's encountered during the first three seasons of Bar Rescue.
"Taffer's Top 10: Toughest Rescues"	N/A	N/A	June 29, 2014	993	0.88
Jon counts down the ten toughest rescues he's undertaken during the first three seasons of Bar Rescue.
