= Wayne Mills (singer) =

American country singer (1969–2013)

- Born: Jerald Wayne Mills; August 17, 1969; Arab, Alabama, U.S.
- Died: November 23, 2013 (aged 44) Nashville, Tennessee, U.S.
- Genres: Country; outlaw country
- Occupation: Singer-songwriter
- Instruments: Vocals, guitar
- Years active: 1999–2013
- Spouse: Carol Mills (m. 2000)
- Website: waynemillsband.com

Jerald Wayne Mills (August 17, 1969 – November 23, 2013) was an American country musician, known for touring with the Wayne Mills Band for over fifteen years and playing alongside Blake Shelton, Jamey Johnson and 2006 American Idol winner Taylor Hicks. During his career, Mills released five studio albums (with a sixth unreleased) and two live albums. He had seven Top 20 singles in Europe from 2008 to 2010, including a chart-topper in Belgium in 2009.

== Early life ==
Jerald Wayne Mills was born on August 17, 1969 in Arab, Alabama to Jack and Pauline Mills. Mills played baseball for Wallace State Junior College and football for the University of Alabama, earning a bachelor of science degree in education.

== Personal life ==
Mills and his wife Carol, were married in 2000, and they had a son.

== Death ==
In the early hours of November 23, 2013, in Nashville, Tennessee, Mills was shot in the head by bar owner Chris Ferrell, allegedly over an argument involving Mills lighting up a cigarette in a nonsmoking area. He was rushed to a hospital but later died. The incident occurred towards the end of an afterparty at the bar following a recent makeover it received for the television show Bar Rescue, with its episode scheduled to air the following day. The episode featuring it was later pulled, and the bar closed shortly after. The building was demolished in 2016. On March 6, 2015, Ferrell was found guilty of second-degree murder in Mills' death and received a twenty-year sentence with no possibility of parole. The verdict and sentence were appealed but were upheld by the appeals court in 2019.

== Discography (with Wayne Mills Band) ==
Title	Album details	Notes
The Wayne Mills Band	Release date: June 13, 1999; Label: self-released; Format: CD	Debut album.
Live At Harry's Bar	Release date: August 17, 1999; Label: self-released; Format: CD	
Bad Man	Release date: August 17, 2002; Label: self-released; Format: CD	
Ain't it Great To Be... aLIVE At Harry's II	Release date: August 17, 2002; Label: self-released; Format: CD	
Someday	Release date: June 13, 2007; Label: self-released; Format: CD	
Under the Influence of Outlaws & Mama	Release date: August 17, 2007; Label: self-released; Format: CD, Digital	Reissued on August 17, 2008 with a new final track that replaced the one from the original release. The 2008 version is available digitally.
The Last Honky Tonk	Release date: June 7, 2010; Label: Diesel LLC; Format: CD, Digital	The band's final album before Wayne Mills' death, and the only release that is available via mainstream digital retailers.

== In popular culture ==
Mills is the subject of the song "King of Alabama" by Brent Cobb.
