= Josh Capon =

American chef and television personality

Josh Capon (born 1972) is an American chef and television personality.

== Early life ==
Josh Capon attended the University of Maryland, where he discovered his talent in cooking for his friends, which he funded by accepting small donations. Subsequently, this led to Capon transferring to Johnson and Wales University.

== Career ==
While at Johnson and Wales, Capon was selected as a culinary intern for Charlie Palmer to work at his acclaimed Manhattan restaurant Aureole. After graduating in 1994, Capon continued to work for Palmer and helped open The Lenox Room.

He went on to work for David Burke at the Park Avenue Café and then spent a year traveling in Europe, honing his cooking expertise.

Upon his return, Capon became a sous-chef at The St. Regis Hotel's Astor Court under Gray Kunz, where he then reunited with Charlie Palmer and became the executive chef at Alva, Palmer's American bistro. After a couple of years as executive chef at Matthew's on the Upper East Side, he took the reins as executive chef of Canteen in SoHo.

After a few years, he partnered with John McDonald and Josh Pickard to open Lure Fishbar in the former Canteen space, a sophisticated seafood and sushi restaurant. The trio went on to open Burger & Barrel Winepub, El Toro Blanco, Bowery Meat Company, and a Miami version of Lure Fishbar in the historic Loews hotel.

Capon is a seven-time winner of the People's Choice award at the NYC Wine & Food Festival's Burger Bash and has appeared on Rachael Ray, Good Morning America, TODAY, and the Food Network. He has also been featured in The New York Times and New York Magazine.

In 2021, he co-founded the hospitality company VCR Group with Gary Vaynerchuk, Conor Hanlon, and David Rodolitz. In early 2022, VCR Group partnered with Masa Ito and Kevin Kim to open ITO, a 16-seat omakase in Tribeca, New York. Later in 2022, VCR Group began selling NFT memberships for Flyfish Club, a planned private dining club, the location of which had not yet been determined. In April 2024 the club began accepting cash for memberships. Flyfish Club opened in September 2024 on the Lower East Side.

Capon has participated in the US Open for many years through his Flyfish pop-up, where he serves lobster rolls, oysters, and other signature dishes.

In 2023, VCR Group expanded its restaurant portfolio with the addition of Capon's Burgers, located in the Fontainebleau on the Las Vegas Strip, and the Modern American restaurant, Little Maven, in New York City's Flatiron neighborhood. In September 24, 2024, he became a chef at the restaurant Flyfish Club in New York, which was funded with NFT sales.
