= Bar Rescue =

Reality television series

- Genre: Reality
- Developed by: Darrin Reed (Note: Credited with "concept co-developed by")
- Directed by: Neal Gallagher
- Presented by: Jon Taffer; Various (season 9)
- Narrated by: P.J. King
- Country of origin: United States
- Original language: English
- No. of seasons: 10
- No. of episodes: 301 (list of episodes)

Production
- Executive producers: Todd Nelson; Dj Nurre; Tim Warren; Katy Dierks
- Producers: James Agiesta; Jason Garnett
- Running time: 41–42 minutes
- Production companies: Eyeworks (2011–14); 3 Ball Entertainment (2015–present); MTV Entertainment Studios (2021–25); Paramount Television Studios (2025–present)

Original release
- Network: Spike
- Release: July 17, 2011 – September 17, 2017
- Network: Paramount Network
- Release: March 11, 2018 – present

Related
- Marriage Rescue

Bar Rescue is an American reality television series that airs on Paramount Network (formerly Spike during the first five seasons). It stars Jon Taffer, a long-time food and beverage industry consultant specializing in nightclubs, bars, and pubs. Taffer offers his professional expertise, renovations and equipment to desperately failing bars in an effort to save them from closing.

The show premiered on what was then known as Spike in the United States on July 17, 2011. In the UK, the show originally aired on 5Star, later moving to Spike (UK), which is now 5Spike/5Action.

A spin-off series titled Marriage Rescue premiered on June 2, 2019.

On September 22, 2020, it was announced that the series would move to another ViacomCBS (now Paramount Skydance) network, as part of a since-rescinded plan to shift the Paramount Network to television films and miniseries. Bar Rescue's move also never took place, as its eighth season premiered on Paramount Network on May 2, 2021. The eighth season focused on Taffer's residence of Las Vegas, a city whose hospitality industry was devastated during the COVID-19 pandemic, then returned with episodes of bars throughout the United States in its traditional format on March 20, 2022.

== Overview ==
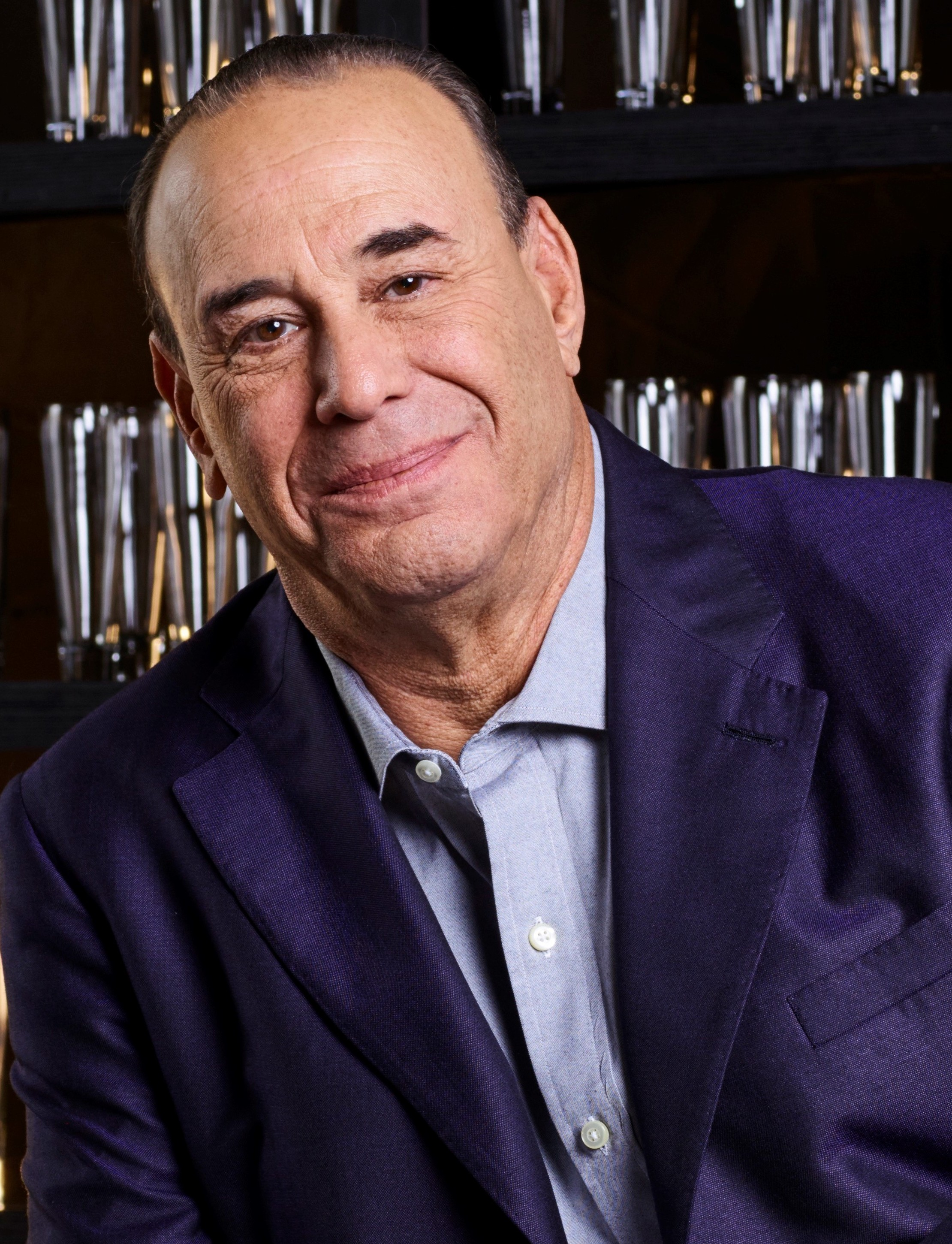
Host Jon Taffer

The series stars Jon Taffer, owner and chairman of bar/nightclub consulting firm Taffer Dynamics, Inc. Taffer is a bar and nightclub owner who has started, flipped, or owned numerous establishments in a career that spans over three decades. Bar owners submit an application via the Paramount Network website to have their failing establishment rescued by Taffer and his team of experts.

A typical episode begins with Taffer's team performing reconnaissance and surveillance on a struggling bar to determine its operational and service weaknesses. For the recon, one or more team members and/or local residents enter the bar, order food and drinks to gauge their quality, and form an opinion of the atmosphere and service. The surveillance involves hidden cameras, preinstalled with the owner's consent, through which Taffer and his team watch the kitchen and customer service areas. He then introduces himself to the owner(s) and staff to discuss his findings, and to describe the changes he believes should be made (management, customer service, cleanliness, etc.) in order to make the bar profitable. He also examines the bar's financial records to find possible cost savings. During these meetings, Taffer exhibits a brusque, no-nonsense, and confrontational attitude intended to goad the owner(s) and staff into making drastic changes to the way the bar is run – including the firing of inept and/or dishonest employees when necessary.

Taffer's team members consists of experts, whether it's mixologists for the bar, chefs for the kitchen, hostesses for service performances, and at times, security personnel for training in security and hookah makers for bars that serve hookah. Jon's team trains the staff on methods of improving food/drink preparation, customer service, and efficiency, frequently concentrating on a more limited selection of recipes than the bar typically offers. After the initial training, Taffer puts the bar through a "stress test" (similar to a soft launch), inviting in a large crowd of patrons in order to determine how well the staff can use their newly learned skills to deal with the pressure of a busy night. He uses market research, technological tools, and partner companies to scientifically measure the bar's performance. After discussing the stress test's results with owners and staff, Taffer meets with his experts to begin devising a new concept for the bar.

The experts put the staff through a second, more extensive phase of training, overhauling the menu to fit the new concept. Once this phase is complete, Taffer closes the bar for a few days so that construction crews can redesign the interior. Deep-cleaning and structural work are performed when necessary. After the overhauled bar (often re-branded with a completely new name or a variation of the old one) is unveiled, Taffer takes the owners and staff on a tour to point out its new features. During the grand re-opening, he observes the overall improvement as a large crowd again packs the bar.

An epilogue segment describes the changes in the bar's success or failure since the re-opening, through a combination of text and interviews with the owners and staff. Bars are not required to keep the changes that Taffer implements, and some have reverted to their original names, concepts, and/or menus since being featured on the show.

The bars featured on the show are already in dire financial and operational situations by the time Taffer intervenes, posing a significant challenge to a turnaround. Despite this, data shows that over half the bars featured, 92 of the first 166 featured through the midway point of season 6, have remained open, with the remaining 74 unable to overcome their challenges. Of the bars featured, Taffer has left four without remodeling (O Face Bar, an intended re-rescue of Second Base Bar & Grill, Black Light District Rock and Roll Lounge, and Hideaway Bar & Grill) and one without a grand re-opening (The Dugout).

== Episodes ==
Season	Episodes	Originally released		
Season	Episodes	First released	Last released	Network
1	10	July 17, 2011	September 25, 2011	Spike
2	10	July 29, 2012	September 30, 2012	Spike
3	40	February 10, 2013	May 4, 2014	Spike
4	58	October 5, 2014	July 31, 2016	Spike
5	31	August 7, 2016	September 17, 2017	Spike
6	47	March 11, 2018	September 29, 2019	Paramount Network
7	16	March 1, 2020	September 13, 2020	Paramount Network
8	37	May 2, 2021	June 11, 2023	Paramount Network
9	40	February 25, 2024	June 29, 2025	Paramount Network
10	12	February 22, 2026	May 3, 2026	Paramount Network

== Production ==
The series is from The Biggest Loser producers J.D. Roth and Todd A. Nelson for 3 Ball Productions/Eyeworks US. Spike announced picking up 10 episodes of Bar Rescue in January 2011. The show began shooting in April 2011. It was renewed on September 14, 2011 for a second season in the summer of 2012, from which the first episode of that season aired on July 29. Season 3 of the show premiered on February 10, 2013. On May 9, 2013, Spike TV renewed Bar Rescue for a fourth season of 20 more episodes.

On March 21, 2014, Spike TV ordered 20 more episodes of Bar Rescue. On June 27, Taffer announced on Facebook that he would begin shooting 30 episodes for season 4 after a week-long trip to Paris. The first half premiered on October 5, 2014 while the second half premiered on February 8, 2015. On May 30, 2015, Taffer announced on Facebook that he finished shooting season 4. It was announced that the remaining episodes for season 4 would air beginning Sunday, June 21, 2015.

In May 2015, Taffer announced season 5, with at least 20 episodes, on his Facebook page, with an update from Spike, issued in July 2016, that they had increased the fifth season to a total of 30 episodes. A sixth season was announced with a March 11, 2018 start date.

On May 2, 2019, the series was renewed for a seventh season with 12 episodes. The seventh season's roll-out from March 2020 until June 2020 was a victim of unfortunate timing, starting at the first height of the COVID-19 pandemic in the United States. Due to stay-at-home orders throughout the country and takeout food-only non-alcohol restrictions placed on the industry, the majority of the bars featured in the season were unable to take advantage of the post-episode publicity boost usually afforded the featured bars. It also effectively froze the show indefinitely from any future filming or planning for a presumptive eighth season, and the last half of the seventh season was fulfilled with a series of clip shows categorizing certain rescues into themes.

Eventually, the series went back into production for its eighth season with an all-Las Vegas season, due to the impact of the pandemic in Nevada on the region's hospitality industry. On February 9, 2022, Paramount Network announced that the second part of the eighth season would premiere on March 20. On July 10, 2022, Taffer confirmed on Twitter that the ninth season was in production. The ninth season premiered on February 25, 2024. On January 17, 2025, the show was renewed for a tenth season. On the same day, Paramount Network announced that the second part of the ninth season would premiere on February 23.

Some episodes in the ninth season did not have Taffer appear in them, but instead had either bartender Phil Willis, who was a regular in many earlier episodes, and Ashish Alfred, who had never appeared on the show before the ninth season, as host.

== Failed rescues ==
The bars featured on the show are already in dire financial and operational situations by the time Taffer intervenes, posing a significant challenge to a turnaround. Nearly half the bars featured, 74 of the first 166 featured through the midway point of season 6, were unable to overcome their challenges resulting in the bar closure.

For example, the changes the show made to Downey's Irish Pub, featured in the July 24, 2011, episode "Downey's and Out", were not enough to prevent a planned sheriff's sale on August 2, 2011, due to $2.4 million owed to the city of Philadelphia and Wells Fargo bank, including $125,881 in business-privilege, wage, liquor and other taxes. Breakwall (from the season 1 episode, "Beach Bummer") closed in January 2012. Season 1's Swanky Bubbles, after reverting to its original title, has also closed its doors. The show's first rescued bar of season 2, Piratz Tavern, reverted to its original pirate theme and would later close in April 2015 (see below).

The Rocky Point Cantina in Tempe, Arizona, closed after a repaint of the bar triggered a code inspection, which revealed the show had not obtained permits for the repaint and other modifications. Further inspections uncovered years of modifications to the building that had been completed without building permits. The bar owner opted to file for bankruptcy rather than bring his building up to code.

Sometimes, while a rescue bar doesn't close, the bar owner at times reverts the name back to how it was before the rescue. The Chicken Bone, Canyon Inn, Angry Ham's Garage, Weber's Place, The Brixton, ZanZbar, Stand Up Scottsdale!, and KC's reverted to their original names. The Chicken Bone brought back its previously popular menu, while Angry Ham's replaced unpopular items with previously popular items from its original menu. Season 2's J.A. Murphy's was sold by the owners shortly after the makeover, becoming a Mexican restaurant. Stand Up Scottsdale reverted to its original name due to problems with becoming a franchise of the Laugh Factory.

Rocket Room 6 in Austin, Texas, reverted to its old name, The Brixton, 6 weeks after its relaunch. The owner initially continued his use of social media to insult critics who were documented in the show, although the bar was not closed. After the owner reconciled and made amends with Taffer in a Back to the Bar special, he apologized and has since toned down his behavior.

=== Piratz Tavern ===
The pirate-themed Piratz Tavern in Silver Spring, Maryland, which had been rebranded Corporate Bar and Grill by Taffer, reversed all of the changes Taffer made to the bar shortly after their episode was filmed. The owner released a YouTube video called "Piratz Revenge", showing the "Corporate" sign created by Taffer's team being shot at and burned in effigy. The video was heavily disliked by YouTube viewers, and garnered a positive rating of only 4%. Taffer said of their decision, "If you had a pirate concept that had failed for five years and had a new concept, would you go back to the concept that failed for five years or try something new? It defies logic that someone would go back to a (failed) concept just because they don't like the new name." The owners blamed the "negative publicity" on the show. Piratz was revisited as part of the April 5, 2015, episode, in which Taffer grades the bar an "epic fail", and the owner sought a second rescue. Within a week of the revisited episode's premiere, however, Piratz decided to close its doors for good. In a "Back to the Bar" episode, the owners made amends with Taffer and announced that they plan to open a new bar, Bar Refuge, within the next year in Florida. They also appeared alongside their daughter in the episode "Getting Freaky at the Tiki" as recon spies for The Tiki Lounge.

In October 2016, Bar Refuge opened in Melbourne, Florida. In October 2018, the bar was sold to new owners, who kept the name. In early 2022, Bar Refuge closed and another business now occupies the spot.

=== LABrewCo failure ===
Taffer's most expensive rescue also resulted in his biggest failure. His visit to The Los Angeles Brewing Company during season 4 saw him put $1 million into updating the bar, which included the installation of a self-service beer tap and an in-house brewing system, which was intended to allow the bar, which was rebranded as LABrewCo, to start serving its own beer. Four months after the rescue, the brewing system was discovered to have never been used, the self-serve tap was disconnected, and the owner had reversed changes to the bar taps and the menu. In addition, LABrewCo's liquor license had been suspended and the business was put up for sale.

== Legal issues ==
=== Lawsuits ===
Jon and Nicole Taffer, along with the show's production company Bongo LLC, have been sued by Dr. Paul T. Wilkes from Bar 702 (formerly Sand Dollar). In the episode "Don't Mess with Taffer's Wife", Wilkes is shown to hit on Nicole, and Jon yells at him in retaliation. However, Wilkes stated that the producers ordered him to be sleazy and make offensive comments on women, and texted him to "Hit on [Mrs. Taffer] hardcore!!" After Wilkes did so, Wilkes states that Taffer called the control room to tell them to have a drink near the spot where he intended to confront Wilkes, so he could throw it in his face, and said to a colleague, "Now I'm going to show you why my show is Number One." According to Wilkes, Taffer came in to confront him and showed him footage of his audition tapes, in which he insulted the way Taffer dressed. Taffer then physically assaulted Wilkes, leading to a scuffle, resulting in a hyperventilating Taffer collapsing onto the floor. Wilkes stated that he suffered from emotional distress and symptoms such as migraines, nausea, vomiting, night terrors, crying spells, severe depression and anxiety attacks as a result of the confrontation. He says he didn't thank Jon for rescuing his bar because of what happened to him.

In March 2016, Tsang Han Wang filed a lawsuit against Jon Taffer along with the show's production company, claiming that he was fired due to Taffer's preference for younger and attractive female employees. The lawsuit also alleged that Wang was hired as a project manager for Taffer in April 2015, however, Wang says he was fired in August 2015 because Taffer "preferred to have young, attractive females employed." Wang stated that he was assigned with tasks outside his area of expertise and was given a 30-day action plan that amounted to constructive discharge. Additionally, Wang also claims of sex discrimination, as well as racial discrimination, as Taffer allegedly "discriminated against Plaintiff by unfairly targeting him, due to his race, by treating him disparately and terminating him in order to hire Caucasian females."

=== Nashville rescue and Wayne Mills murder ===
During the taping for season 3, Taffer visited BoondoxXx BBQ & Juke Joint in Nashville, Tennessee and worked with owner Chris Ferrell, who was noted for having a hot temper. The rescued bar was renamed Pit & Barrel and the episode featuring the bar was to air on November 24, 2013, but on the night before the episode was supposed to air, Ferrell was arrested by Nashville police for shooting and killing country singer Wayne Mills during an argument inside the remodeled Pit & Barrel. Spike immediately pulled the episode from its originally scheduled premiere slot in primetime, but it became available to watch online via various third-party uploads from people who recorded it during the brief time it was shown.

Ferrell stood trial for the murder of Mills and asserted he acted in self-defense, claiming that Mills had violated the bar's nonsmoking rule and had threatened to kill him with a broken beer bottle. The jury convicted Ferrell of second-degree murder in March 2015 after a long-delayed trial, and he was given a 20-year sentence without the possibility of parole. The verdict and sentence were appealed, but were upheld by the appeals court in 2019.
